= Danve =

Danve is a surname. Notable people with the surname include:

- Ambadas Danve, Indian politician
- Chandrakant Danve, Indian politician
- Pundlik Hari Danve (1926–2021), Indian politician
- Raosaheb Danve, Indian politician
- Santosh Danve, Indian politician
