= Jalna Lok Sabha constituency =

Constituency of the Indian parliament in Maharashtra

Coordinates: 19.8°N 75.9°E

Jalna Lok Sabha constituency MH-18
- Lok Sabha constituency
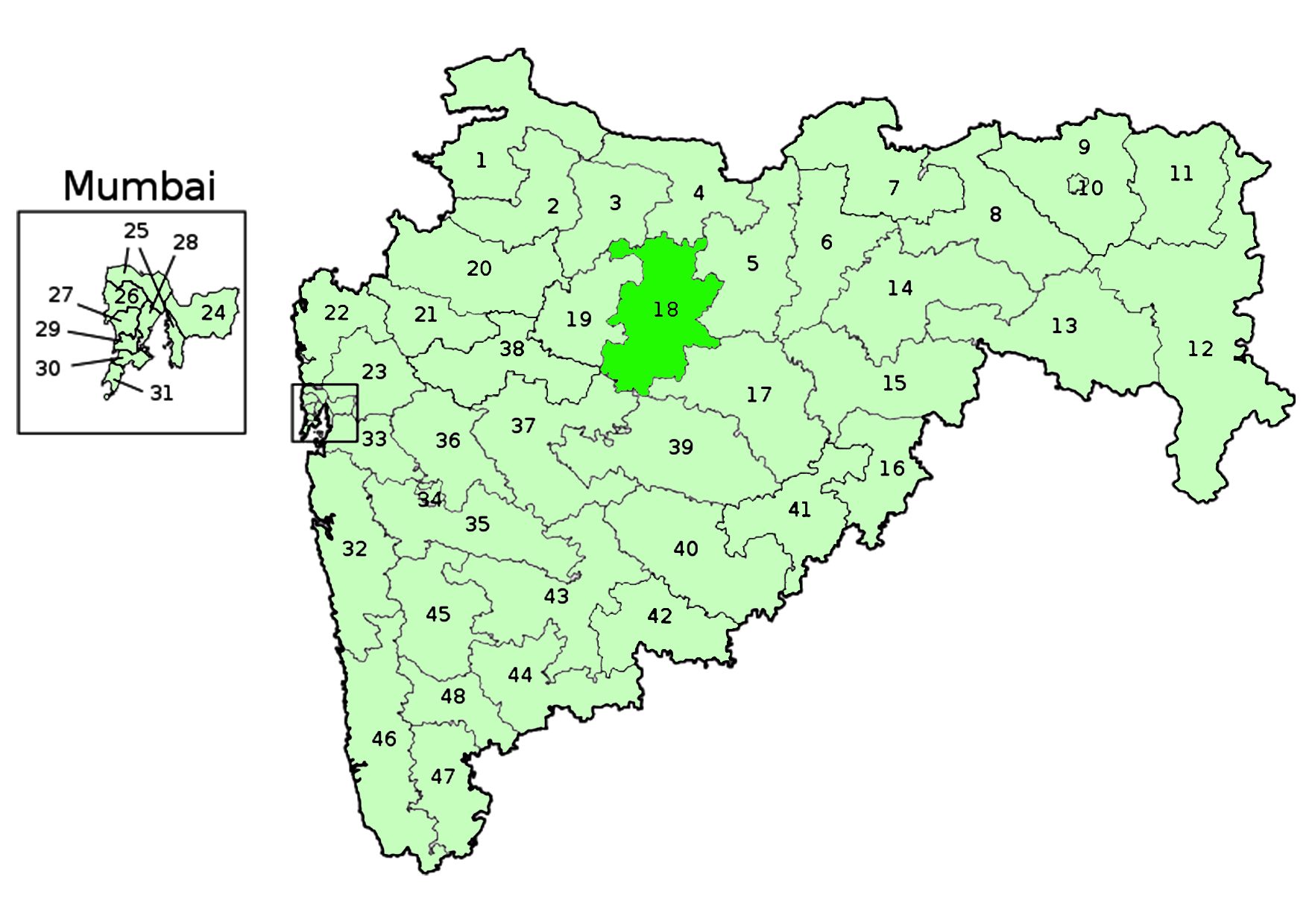
- Dark green area is Jalna Lok Sabha

Constituency details
- Country: India
- Region: Western India
- State: Maharashtra
- Division: Aurangabad
- Assembly constituencies: Jalna; Badnapur; Bhokardan; Sillod; Phulambri; Paithan
- Established: 1952
- Total electors: 19,67,574
- Reservation: None

Member of Parliament
- 18th Lok Sabha
- Incumbent Kalyan Kale
- Party: Indian National Congress
- Elected year: 2024
- Preceded by: Raosaheb Danve

Jalna Lok Sabha constituency is one of the 48 Lok Sabha (parliamentary) constituencies in Maharashtra state in Western India.

== Assembly Segments ==
Presently, after the implementation of delimitation of parliamentary constituencies in 2008, Jalna Lok Sabha constituency comprises six Vidhan Sabha (legislative assembly) segments. These segments are:

#	Name	District	Member	Party	Leading (in 2024)
101	Jalna	Jalna	Arjun Khotkar	SHS	INC
102	Badnapur (SC)	Jalna	Narayan Kuche	BJP	INC
103	Bhokardan	Jalna	Santosh Danve	BJP	INC
104	Sillod	Aurangabad	Abdul Sattar	SHS	INC
106	Phulambri	Aurangabad	Anuradha Chavan	BJP	INC
110	Paithan	Aurangabad	Vilas Sandipanrao Bhumre	SHS	INC

== Members of Parliament ==
Year	Member	Party
Hyderabad State
1952	Hanumantrao Vaishnav (Note: Ambad seat)	Indian National Congress
Bombay State
1957	Saif Tyabji	Indian National Congress
1957^	A. V. Ghare	Peasants and Workers Party of India
1960^	Ramrao Narayan Rao	Indian National Congress
Maharashtra State
1962	Ramrao Narayan Rao	Indian National Congress
1967	V. N. Jadhav	Indian National Congress
1971	Baburao Kale	Indian National Congress
1977	Pundlik Danve	Janata Party
1980	Balasaheb Pawar	Indian National Congress
1984	Balasaheb Pawar	Indian National Congress
1989	Pundlik Danve	Bharatiya Janata Party
1991	Ankushrao Tope	Indian National Congress
1996	Uttamsingh Pawar	Bharatiya Janata Party
1998	Uttamsingh Pawar	Bharatiya Janata Party
1999	Raosaheb Danve	Bharatiya Janata Party
2004	Raosaheb Danve	Bharatiya Janata Party
2009	Raosaheb Danve	Bharatiya Janata Party
2014	Raosaheb Danve	Bharatiya Janata Party
2019	Raosaheb Danve	Bharatiya Janata Party
2024	Kalyan Kale	Indian National Congress

^ by-poll

== Election results ==
=== General Elections 2024 ===
2024 Indian general elections: Jalna
Party	Candidate	Votes	%	±%
INC	Kalyan Vaijinathrao Kale	607,897	44.59	▲14.36
BJP	Raosaheb Dadarao Danve	4,97,939	36.52	▼21.26
Independent	Mangesh Sabale	1,55,930	11.44	N/A
VBA	Prabhakar Devgan Bakale	37,810	2.77	▼3.62
NOTA	None of the Above	3,537	0.26	▼1.03
Majority		1,09,958	8.06	▼19.47
Turnout		13,63,409	69.29	▲4.54
INC gain from BJP		Swing		

=== General elections 2019 ===
2019 Indian general elections: Jalna
Party	Candidate	Votes	%	±%
BJP	Raosaheb Danve	698,019	57.78	▲2.31
INC	Vilas Autade	3,65,204	30.23	▼5.84
VBA	Sharadchandra Wankhede	77,158	6.39	New entry
NOTA	None of the Above	15,637	1.29	
Majority		3,32,815		
Turnout		12,09,096	64.75	
BJP hold		Swing		

=== General elections 2014 ===
2014 Indian general elections: Jalna
Party	Candidate	Votes	%	±%
BJP	Raosaheb Danve	591,428	48.95	+11.47
INC	Vilas Autade	3,84,630	31.84	−6.86
BSP	Sharadchandra Wankhede	67,300	1.96	
Independent	M. Javed A. Wahab	7,704	0.64	
Majority		2,06,798	19.40	
Turnout		10,66,259	67.44	+11.59
BJP hold		Swing		

=== General Elections 2009 ===
2009 Indian general elections: Jalna
Party	Candidate	Votes	%	±%
BJP	Raosaheb Danve	350,710	44.00	−4.87
INC	Kalyan Vaijinath Kale	3,42,228	42.93	+1.17
Majority		8,482	1.07	
Turnout		7,97,127	55.89	−4.96
BJP hold		Swing		

=== General elections 2004 ===
2004 Indian general elections: Jalna
Party	Candidate	Votes	%	±%
BJP	Raosaheb Danve	369,630		
INC	Uttamsingh Pawar	3,08,298		
Majority		61,332		
Turnout		7,56,365		
BJP gain from INC		Swing		

=== General Elections 1991 ===
1991 Indian general election: Jalna
Party	Candidate	Votes	%	±%
INC	Ankushrao Tope	257,837	47.2%	
BJP	Pundlik Hari	189,630	34.7%	
JD	Pataprao Ramrao Ghare	57,844	10.6%	
Doordarshi Party	Kharat Narayan Ganpatrao	4,981	0.9%	
Independent	Vaishnav Ramdas Bajrangdas	4,358	0.8%	
Independent	Kharat Madhukar Nathuji	4,071	0.7%	
Jharkhand Party	Mundhe Inderrao Hiraman	3,898	0.7%	
BSP	Ramchandra Kondiram Tribhuvan	2,855	0.5%	
Independent	Shinde Babasaheb Uttamrao	2,719	0.5%	
Majority		68,207		
Turnout		546,193		
INC gain from BJP		Swing		

=== General Elections 1957 ===
1957 Indian general election: Jalna
Party	Candidate	Votes	%	±%
INC	Saif Faiz Tyabji	76,468	64.31%	
Independent	B. D. Khobragade	42,430	35.69%	
Majority		34,038	28.63%	
Turnout				
INC gain from Independent		Swing		
