= Khotkar =

Khotkar is a surname. Notable people with the surname include:

- Anirudh Khotkar, Indian politician
- Arjun Khotkar (born 1962), Indian politician
