= Bhokardan =

- City
- Location in Maharashtra, India Bhokardan (India)
- Coordinates: 20.253°N 75.769°E
- Country: India
- State: Maharashtra
- District: Jalna
- Named for: King Bhogvardhan

Government
  - Body: Municipal Council
  - President: Vacant
- Elevation: 587 m (1,926 ft)

Population (2011)
  - Total: 311,303

Languages
  - Official: Marathi
- Time zone: UTC+5:30 (IST)
- PIN: 431114
- Vehicle registration: MH-21

Bhokardan is a city in the Indian state of Maharashtra and is one the oldest cities in India. Bhokardan was a part of the Hyderabad State until it joined India in 1948 as part of the Annexation of Hyderabad. In 1960, it became a part of the newly formed state of Maharashtra from the bilingual Bombay state. The ruins of the old fortifications are still visible around the city; the area of the old fort now houses tehsil offices. Bhokardan has been identified by modern historians as the capital of an ancient district raja Bhogavardhan.

== Etymology ==
According to legends, the name Bhokardan is derived from the name of king Bhogvardhan or Bhagdnath, who ruled this city in ancient time. Local legends consider this to be a capital city of Bhoumasura, a mythological demon, who was killed by Hindu god Shri Krishna.

== History ==
Bhokardan is situated on the bank of Kelana river. Bhokardan has been identified by modern historians with the ancient city of Bhogavardhana. One of the earliest references of Bhokardan is found in Markandeya Purana, where it is described as a prosperous trading city in Dandakaranya area, located on the trade route from Ujjayini, in central India to Prathishthana, then capital city of Satavahanas. Similar, references were also found in various other ancient literature. In earlier period Bhokardan was a Janapada, which later got status of an independent region. Bhokardan was among the major cities of the Satavahana kingdom along with Prathishthana and Ter.

The inscription records at stupas of Bharhut and Sanchi, mention receiving donations from inhabitants of this city for their construction. There is a reference in an article from 593 AD that, the king of Mahishmati, Raja Shankargan, of Kalachuri dynasty, has donated some land to a Brahmin in Bhogvardan region. However, the history of this place in the Middle Ages is not known. In later period of Peshwas rule, this city came under control of the Nizam of Hyderabad. Bhokardan was part of Hyderabad State until its annexation into the Indian Union in 1948. In 1960, it became a part of newly form state of Maharashtra from bilingual Bombay state. The ruins of old fortification are still visible around the city; the old fort area now houses the Tehsil office.

Excavation at Bhokardan: An ancient site comprising two mounds, about 70 ft high, was discovered by M. N. Deshpande near Bhokardan in 1958. Subsequently, a joint evacuation was carried away by a combined team of Nagpur University and Marathwada University, in 1973–74, during this evacuation two periods of occupation were identified:

- Period I
  - Period Ia - early Satavahana period
  - Period Ib - late Satavahana period
- Period II post Satavahana period.

During the excavations, traces of foundations, brick walls, floors, post-holes, fallen roofs and a ring well were discovered. The artifacts found from the site included punch-marked coins, copper coins of the Satavahanas and the Kshatrapas; a few terracotta bullae with legends in Greek; coin moulds and seals. About 2000 beads made of terracotta, glass, shell and semi-precious stones were also found. A large number of terracotta, iron, copper and ivory objects were found from the site. The other important items found at site compromised: scores of human and animal figurines; ivory and shell bangles; terracotta ear ornaments; saddle querns with Buddhist symbols and burnt grains which compromised wheat, Jowar, gram, ber and rice.

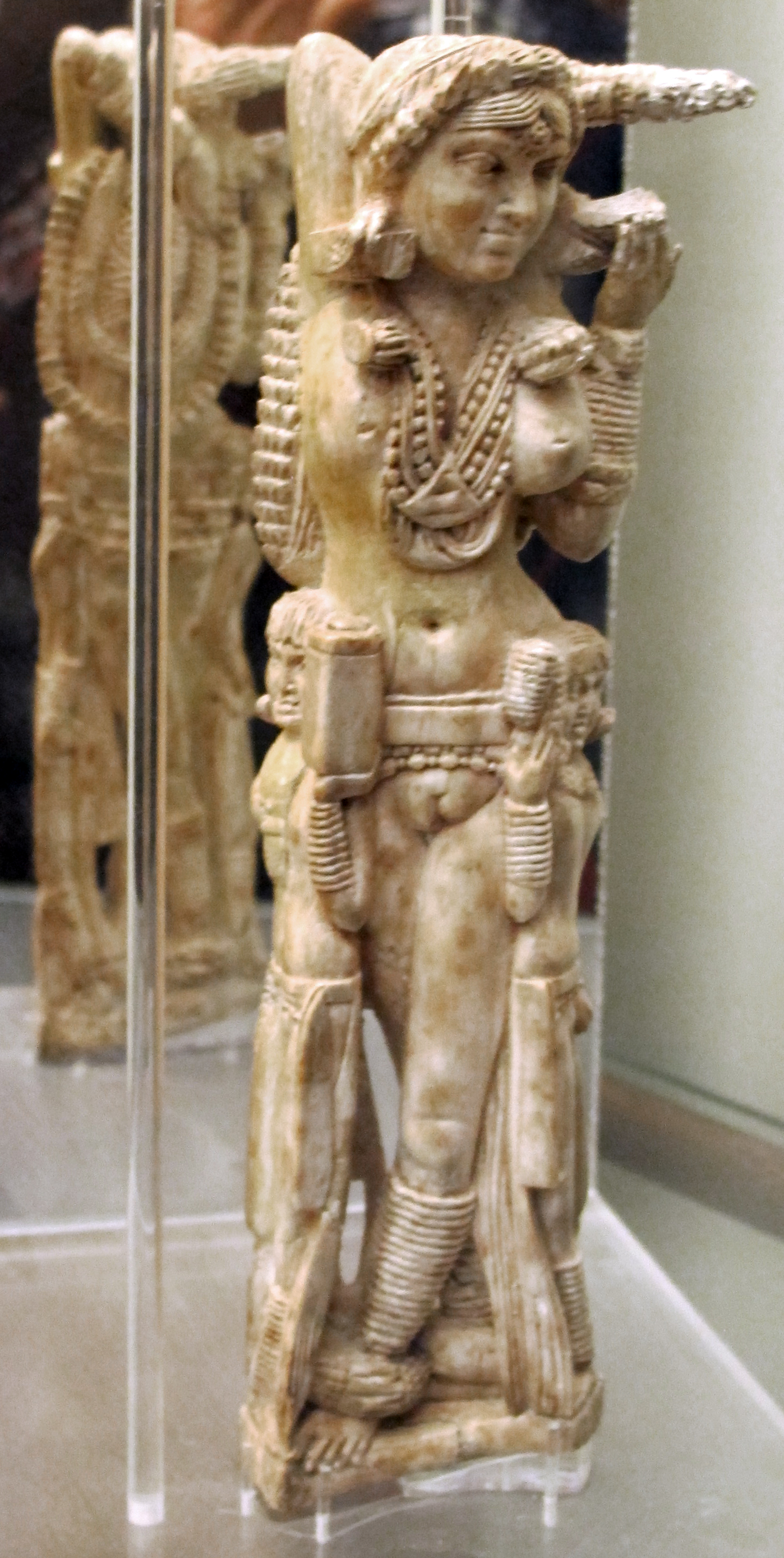
The Pompeii Lakshmi ivory statuette (1st century CE) found in the ruins of Pompeii in Italy is thought to have originated in Bhokardan.

However, the most exquisite of all the find was the lower half of an ivory female figurine, carved in the round with two female attendants. It is reminiscent of the ivory statue of Hindu goddess found at ancient Roman town-city Pompeii near modern Naples in the Italy, which was destroyed and buried under ash and pumice in the eruption of Mount Vesuvius in 79 AD. Numbers of scholars have argued that the ivory statue of Pompeii had its origin at Bhokardan, which found its way either through ancient caravan based silk route or via ship based spice route to Pompeii in the first century AD. Similar ivory objects were also found at Ter. This statues serves as a testimonial of trade relationships of the ancient world.

During Satavahanas' period Bhokardan was a center for ivory artifacts, which were traded for other items. After the decline of the Satavahanas, Bhokardan lost its importance as a major trade center, leading to its downfall. It seems to have been re-occupied only in medieval period.

The ivory female statue and number of other artifacts which were found during excavation are now preserved and displayed at the history museum, of department of History & Ancient Indian Culture, of Dr. Babasaheb Ambedkar Marathwada University, Aurangabad.

== Geography ==
Bhokardan is located at 20.27°N 75.77°E. It has an average elevation of 587 metres (1925 feet). The old city lies on small hills on the south bank of Kelana river. Over the last few decades, city has expanded and continue to grow southwards, towards the road to Jalna.

== Demographics ==
As of 2018 India census, Bhokardan had a population of 70,416. Males constitute 35751 of the population and females 34665. The population of children aged 0-6 is 3767 which is 15.43% of total population of Bhokardan (M Cl). The female sex ratio is 915 against state average of 929. Moreover, the child sex ratio in Bhokardan is around 859 compared to Maharashtra state average of 894. The literacy rate of Bhokardan city is 81.96% lower than state average of 82.34%. In Bhokardan, male literacy is around 88.66% while the female literacy rate is 74.72%.

Religions in Bhokardan
Religion	Percent
Hindus	49.95%
Muslims	43.13%
Buddhists	5.43%
Christians	0.10%
Jains	1.20%
Not Stated†	0.15%
Distribution of religions †Includes Sikhs (0.04%), Buddhists (<0.2%).

== Government ==
Bhokardan (constituency number 103) is one of the five Vidhan Sabha constituencies located in Jalna district and is the seat for the Member of the legislative assembly. It covers the entire Jafrabad taluka and part of Bhokardan tehsil of this district. Current MLA for Bhokardan constituency is Santosh Danve of Bhartiya Janta Party, son of Raosaheb Danve.

Bhokardan is part of Jalna Lok Sabha Constituency.

== Economy ==
Weekly market of Bhokardan is on Saturday of every week .

== Gallery ==
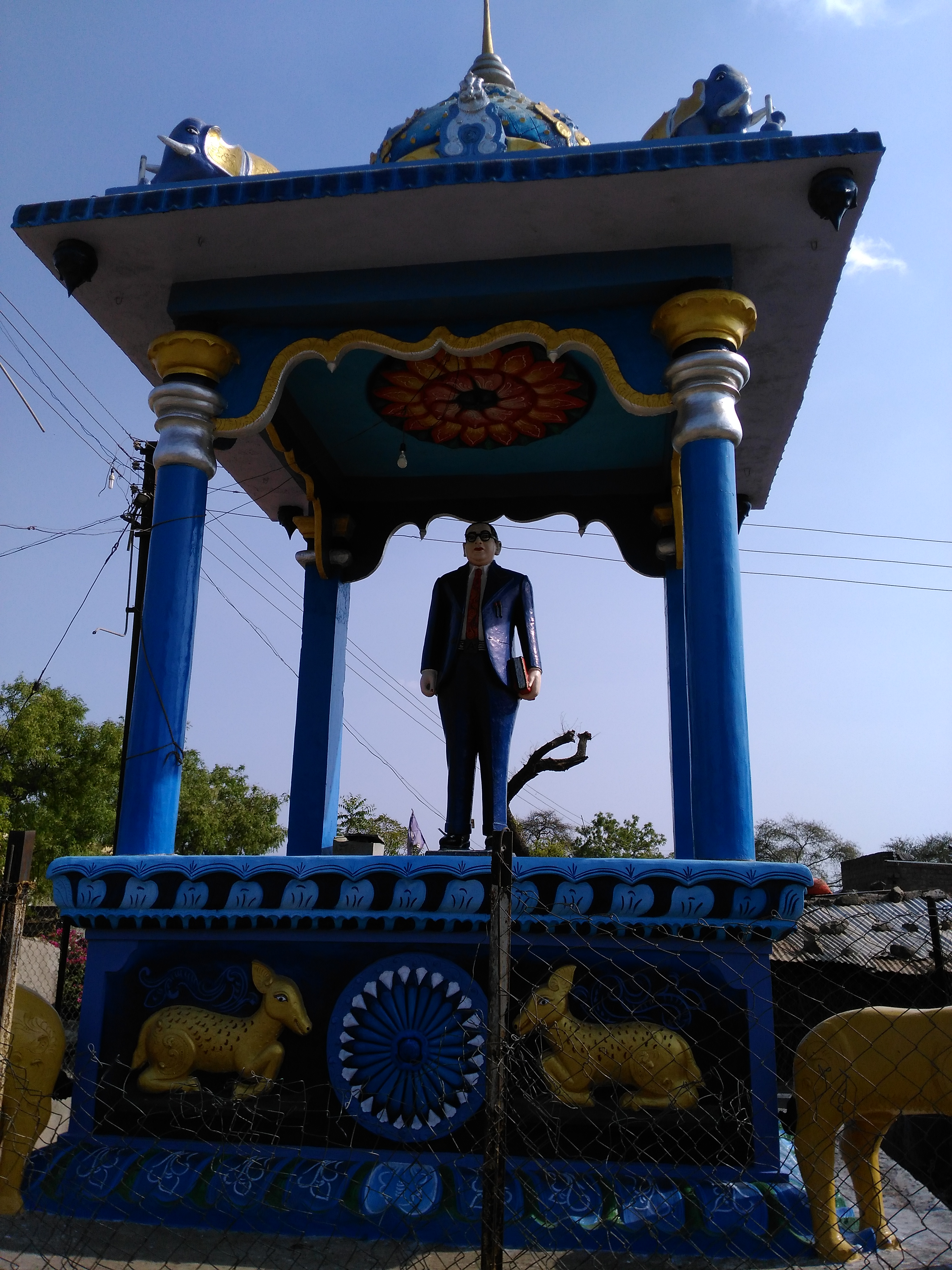
Dr Babasaheb Ambedkar's statue in Bhokardan

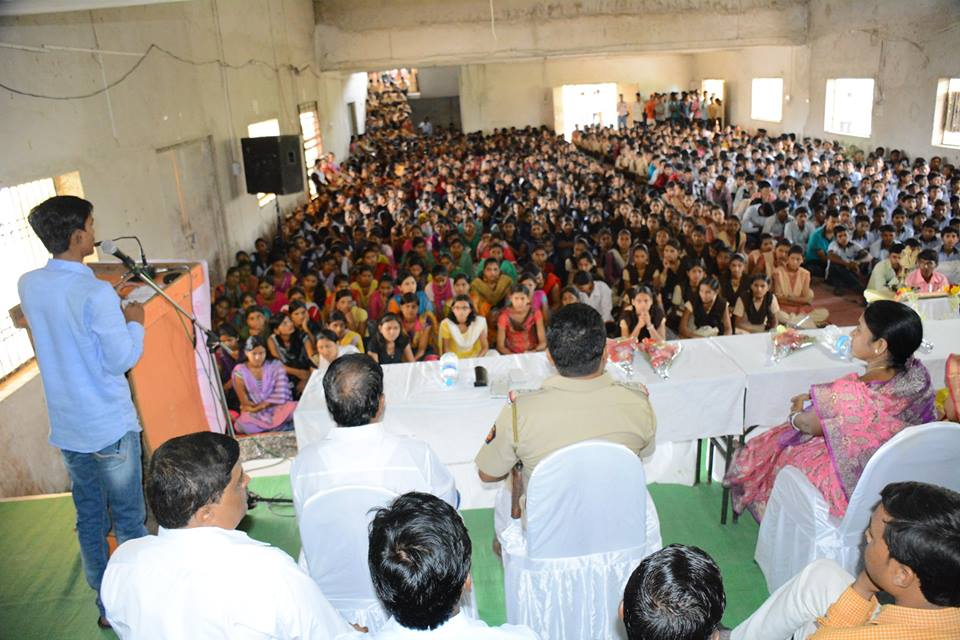
Technology seminar for students in Bhokardan

== See also ==
- Bhokardan (Vidhan Sabha constituency)
- Bhokardan Caves
