= Haribhau Bagade =

Indian politician (born 1945)

Haribhau Kisanrao Bagade
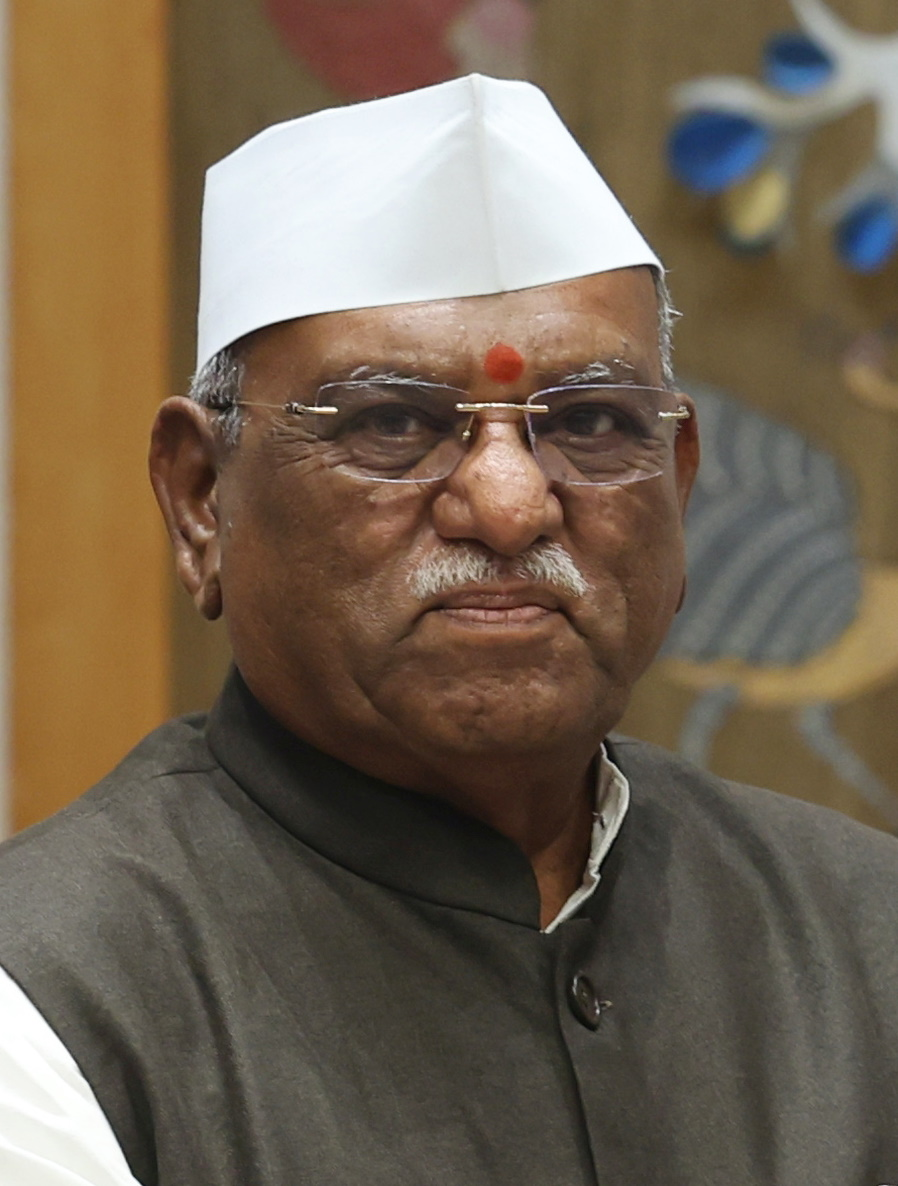
- Bagade in 2024

Governor of Rajasthan
- Incumbent
- Assumed office 31 July 2024
- Chief Minister: Bhajan Lal Sharma
- Preceded by: Kalraj Mishra

Speaker of Maharashtra Legislative Assembly
- In office 12 November 2014 – 25 November 2019
- Deputy: Vijayrao Bhaskarrao Auti
- Chief Minister: Devendra Fadnavis
- Preceded by: Dilip Walse-Patil
- Succeeded by: Nana Patole

Minister of Food & Civil Supplies in Maharashtra
- In office 1997–1999
- Chief Minister: Manohar Joshi; Narayan Rane

Minister of Horticulture & Employment Guarantee in Maharashtra
- In office 1995–1997
- Chief Minister: Manohar Joshi

Member of Maharashtra Legislative Assembly
- In office 2014 – 30 July 2024
- Preceded by: Kalyan Kale
- Succeeded by: Anuradha Chavan
- Constituency: Phulambri
- In office 1985–2004
- Preceded by: Keshavrao Autade
- Succeeded by: Kalyan Kale
- Constituency: Aurangabad East

Personal details
- Born: 17 August 1945 (age 81) Phulambri, Hyderabad State, British India (present-day Telangana, India)
- Party: Bharatiya Janata Party
- Occupation: Politician

Haribhau Kisanrao Bagade (born 17 August 1945) is an Indian politician currently serving as the 45th Governor of Rajasthan from 2024. He is from Maharashtra state. He was the Speaker of Maharashtra Legislative Assembly in 2014, and he is a leader of Bharatiya Janata Party.

== Early life ==
Bagade was born in a Maratha family in Chitepimpalgaon village of Chhatrapati Sambhajinagar district, Maharashtra.

He was the first member of his family to receive formal education. Coming from a farming family, he remained associated with agriculture throughout his life.

Bagade became associated with the Rashtriya Swayamsevak Sangh (RSS) at a young age and later entered public life through social and political work.

== Political career ==
Bagade began his public life through the Rashtriya Swayamsevak Sangh (RSS) and later became associated with the Bharatiya Jana Sangh before joining the Bharatiya Janata Party (BJP).

He was first elected to the Maharashtra Legislative Assembly from Aurangabad East constituency in 1985.

He represented the constituency until 2004 and later represented the Phulambri constituency from 2014 to 2024.

Bagade served as a cabinet minister in the Shiv Sena–Bharatiya Janata Party government in Maharashtra, holding portfolios including Horticulture, Employment Guarantee, Food and Civil Supplies between 1995 and 1999.

He came to be regarded as one of the BJP's prominent leaders in the Marathwada region and was often described as the party's rural face in Maharashtra due to his focus on agricultural and rural issues.

Bagade was elected to the Maharashtra Legislative Assembly six times during his political career.

== Speaker of Maharashtra Legislative Assembly ==
Bagade was unanimously elected Speaker of the Maharashtra Legislative Assembly on 12 November 2014 after candidates from the Congress and Shiv Sena withdrew from the contest.

Following his election, Chief Minister Devendra Fadnavis described him as a grassroots worker and agriculturalist who had held several important positions in the Bharatiya Janata Party and the Shiv Sena–BJP government in Maharashtra.

He served as Speaker during the tenure of the Bharatiya Janata Party-led government headed by Chief Minister Devendra Fadnavis from 2014 to 2019.

== Governor of Rajasthan ==
Bagade assumed office as the Governor of Rajasthan on 31 July 2024.

During his tenure, he has participated in educational, cultural and legislative initiatives across Rajasthan. In May 2025, he unveiled a commemorative logo marking 75 years of the Rajasthan Legislative Assembly and participated in events celebrating the institution's democratic legacy.

In June 2026, Bagade interacted with participants of the Yuva Sangam Phase VI programme under the Ek Bharat Shreshtha Bharat initiative during their visit to Rajasthan.

Political offices
Preceded by Kalraj Mishra	Governor of Rajasthan; 31 July 2024 – present	Incumbent

Political offices
Preceded by Dilip Walse-Patil	Speaker of the Maharashtra Legislative Assembly; 2014 – 2019	Succeeded by Nana Patole

Political offices
Preceded by Keshavrao Autade	Member of Maharashtra Legislative Assembly for Aurangabad East; 1985 – 2004	Succeeded by Kalyan Kale

Political offices
Preceded by Kalyan Kale	Member of Maharashtra Legislative Assembly for Phulambri; 2014 – 2024	Succeeded by Anuradha Chavan
