= Phulambri Assembly constituency =

Constituency of the Maharashtra legislative assembly in India

Coordinates: 20.08°N 75.42°E

Phulambri
- Constituency No. 106 for the Maharashtra Legislative Assembly

Constituency details
- Country: India
- Region: Western India
- State: Maharashtra
- District: Aurangabad
- Lok Sabha constituency: Jalna
- Established: 2008
- Total electors: 371,047
- Reservation: None

Member of Legislative Assembly
- 15th Maharashtra Legislative Assembly
- Incumbent Anuradha Chavan
- Party: Bharatiya Janata Party
- Elected year: 2024

Phulambri Assembly constituency is one of the 288 Vidhan Sabha (legislative assembly) constituencies of Maharashtra state in western India.

== Overview ==
Phulambri is part of Jalna Lok Sabha constituency along with five other Vidhan Sabha segments, namely Badnapur, Jalna and Bhokardan in Jalna district and Sillod and Paithan in Aurangabad district.

== Members of the Legislative Assembly ==
Election	Member	Party
1952	Manikchand Kawalchand Pahade	Indian National Congress
2009	Dr. Kalyan Vaijinathrao Kale	Indian National Congress
2014	Haribhau Bagade	Bharatiya Janata Party
2019	Haribhau Bagade	Bharatiya Janata Party
2024	Anuradha Chavan	Bharatiya Janata Party

== Election results ==
=== Assembly Election 2024 ===
2024 Maharashtra Legislative Assembly election : Phulambri
Party	Candidate	Votes	%	±%
BJP	Anuradha Chavan	135,046	50.25	▲3.42
INC	Autade Vilas Keshavrao	102,545	38.16	▼1.93
Independent	Ramesh Devidas Pawar	13,010	4.84	New
VBA	Mahesh Kalyanrao Ninale	6,170	2.30	▼4.43
NOTA	None of the above	936	0.35	▼0.22
Margin of victory		32,501	12.09	▲5.35
Turnout		269,665	72.68	▲2.77
Total valid votes		268,729		
Registered electors		371,047		▲13.70
BJP hold		Swing	▲3.42	

=== Assembly Election 2019 ===
2019 Maharashtra Legislative Assembly election : Phulambri
Party	Candidate	Votes	%	±%
BJP	Haribhau Bagade	106,190	46.83	▲11.63
INC	Dr. Kalyan Vaijinathrao Kale	90,916	40.09	▲6.63
VBA	Jagannath Kachruji Rithe	15,252	6.73	New
Independent	Vikas Ravsaheb Dandge	5,327	2.35	New
PHJSP	Sudhakar Vishvnath Shinde	2,518	1.11	New
MNS	Amar Suresh Deshmukh	1,627	0.72	▼0.12
NOTA	None of the above	1,301	0.57	▼0.23
Margin of victory		15,274	6.74	▲5.01
Turnout		228,162	69.91	▼3.16
Total valid votes		226,753		
Registered electors		326,352		▲13.57
BJP hold		Swing	▲11.63	

=== Assembly Election 2014 ===
2014 Maharashtra Legislative Assembly election : Phulambri
Party	Candidate	Votes	%	±%
BJP	Haribhau Bagade	73,294	35.20	▼1.36
INC	Dr. Kalyan Vaijinathrao Kale	69,683	33.46	▼4.66
NCP	Anuradha Chavan	31,959	15.35	New
SS	Thombre Rajendra Gangadhar	17,546	8.43	New
Independent	Dahihande Ramesh Gangadhar	6,502	3.12	New
BSP	Salve Vinod Ambadas	4,220	2.03	▼0.83
MNS	Bhaskar Jagnanath Gadekar	1,752	0.84	▼6.38
NOTA	None of the above	1,661	0.80	New
Margin of victory		3,611	1.73	▲0.17
Turnout		209,973	73.07	▲6.59
Total valid votes		208,235		
Registered electors		287,355		▲15.15
BJP gain from INC		Swing	▼2.92	

=== Assembly Election 2009 ===
2009 Maharashtra Legislative Assembly election : Phulambri
Party	Candidate	Votes	%	±%
INC	Dr. Kalyan Vaijinathrao Kale	63,236	38.12	▼12.68
BJP	Haribhau Bagade	60,649	36.56	New
Independent	suhas Shirsath	15,712	9.47	New
MNS	Bhaskar Jagnanath Gadekar	11,979	7.22	New
BSP	Mirza Nisar Baig	4,737	2.86	New
Republican Party of India (Democratic)	Gaikawad Ramesh Laxman	1,899	1.14	New
AIUDF	Shaikh Tayyab Fakira. P	1,584	0.95	New
SBP	Tandale Santosh Manjaram	1,496	0.90	New
Margin of victory		2,587	1.56	▼0.03
Turnout		165,883	66.48	▲38.69
Total valid votes		165,868		
Registered electors		249,538		▲497.92
INC hold		Swing	▼12.68	

=== Assembly Election 1952 ===
1952 Hyderabad State Legislative Assembly election : Phulmarri
Party	Candidate	Votes	%	±%
INC	Manikchand Kawalchand Pahade	5,892	50.80	New
PDF	Tukaram Laxman	5,707	49.20	New
Margin of victory		185	1.59	
Turnout		11,599	27.79	
Total valid votes		11,599		
Registered electors		41,734		
INC win (new seat)				
