= Jalna Assembly constituency =

Constituency of the Maharashtra legislative assembly in India

Coordinates: 19.85°N 75.89°E

Jalna
- Constituency No. 101 for the Maharashtra Legislative Assembly

Constituency details
- Country: India
- Region: Western India
- State: Maharashtra
- Division: Aurangabad
- District: Jalna
- Lok Sabha constituency: Jalna
- Established: 1951
- Total electors: 344,367
- Reservation: None

Member of Legislative Assembly
- 15th Maharashtra Legislative Assembly
- Incumbent Arjun Khotkar
- Party: SHS
- Alliance: NDA
- Elected year: 2024
- Preceded by: Kailas Gorantyal, INC

Jalna Assembly constituency is one of the 288 Vidhan Sabha (legislative assembly) constituencies of Maharashtra state in western India.

== Overview ==
Jalna is part of the Jalna Lok Sabha constituency along with five other Vidhan Sabha segments, namely Badnapur and Bhokardan in Jalna district and Phulambri, Sillod and Paithan in the Aurangabad district.

== Extent ==
The Assembly Constituency presently comprises the following neighbourhoods & Towns:

Neighbourhood
Malegaon Kh., Wanjar Umrad, Waghrul, Tatewadi, Dhawedi, Warud, Nidhona, Panshendra, Nandapur, Navha, Jalna (MC), Ghansawangi (part), Majarewadi, Somnath, Baji Umrad Tanda, Baji Umrad, Sawargaon Hadap, Jaitapur, Manegaon Jahangir, Dahifal, Antarwala, Samangaon

== Members of the Legislative Assembly ==
Election	Member	Party
1952	Syed Mohammed Moosavi	Indian National Congress
1957	Dhondirai Ganpatrao	Indian National Congress
1957	Rustumji Bezon$i	Indian National Congress
1962	Dattatray Rao Khanderao Deshpande	Indian National Congress
1978	Kisanrao Pandharnath Bhise	Indian National Congress
1980	Dayma Ramkishan Ramchandra	Indian National Congress
1985	Dayma Ramkishan Ramchandra	Indian National Congress
1990	Arjun Khotkar	Shiv Sena
1995	Arjun Khotkar	Shiv Sena
1999	Kailas Gorantyal	Indian National Congress
2004	Arjun Khotkar	Shiv Sena
2009	Kailas Gorantyal	Indian National Congress
2014	Arjun Khotkar	Shiv Sena
2019	Kailas Gorantyal	Indian National Congress
2024	Arjun Khotkar	Shiv Sena

== Election results ==
=== Assembly Election 2024 ===
2024 Maharashtra Legislative Assembly election : Jalna
Party	Candidate	Votes	%	±%
SS	Arjun Khotkar	104,665	46.91	▲11.06
INC	Kailas Kisanrao Gorantyal	73,014	32.72	▼16.79
Independent	Abdul Hafiz Abdul Gaffar	30,454	13.65	New
VBA	David Pralhadrao Dhumare	6,322	2.83	▼1.66
Independent	Laxmikant Manohar Pangarkar	2,227	1.00	New
NOTA	None of the above	813	0.36	▼0.10
Margin of victory		31,651	14.19	▲0.53
Turnout		223,940	65.03	▲9.09
Total valid votes		223,127		
Registered electors		344,367		▲3.27
SS gain from INC		Swing	▼2.60	

=== Assembly Election 2019 ===
2019 Maharashtra Legislative Assembly election : Jalna
Party	Candidate	Votes	%	±%
INC	Kailas Gorantyal	91,835	49.51	▲24.15
SS	Arjun Khotkar	66,497	35.85	▲10.32
VBA	Ashok Kharat	8,336	4.49	New
BSP	Rashid Abdul Ajij	6,686	3.60	▼16.99
AIMIM	Iqbal Ahmed Tajuddin Khan	4,315	2.33	New
Independent	David Pralhadrao Dhumare	1,569	0.85	New
NOTA	None of the above	848	0.46	▼0.30
Margin of victory		25,338	13.66	▲13.49
Turnout		186,541	55.94	▼4.49
Total valid votes		185,492		
Registered electors		333,456		▲13.25
INC gain from SS		Swing	▲23.98	

=== Assembly Election 2014 ===
2014 Maharashtra Legislative Assembly election : Jalna
Party	Candidate	Votes	%	±%
SS	Arjun Khotkar	45,078	25.53	▼12.10
INC	Kailas Kisanrao Gorantyal	44,782	25.36	▼26.85
BJP	Arvind Bajirao Chavan	37,591	21.29	New
BSP	Abdul Rashid Abdul Aziz	36,350	20.59	▲19.20
MNS	Ravi Haribhau Raut	5,500	3.12	▲1.19
NCP	Thakur Khushalsingh Nandkishorsingh	1,611	0.91	New
NOTA	None of the above	1,346	0.76	New
Independent	Sandeep Uttamrao Kharat	1,174	0.66	New
Margin of victory		296	0.17	▼14.41
Turnout		177,914	60.43	▲5.99
Total valid votes		176,563		
Registered electors		294,434		▲12.39
SS gain from INC		Swing	▼26.68	

=== Assembly Election 2009 ===
2009 Maharashtra Legislative Assembly election : Jalna
Party	Candidate	Votes	%	±%
INC	Kailas Gorantyal	74,400	52.21	▲10.62
SS	Ambekar Bhaskar Rajaram	53,629	37.63	▼13.87
MNS	Bundele Jitendra Shankarsing	2,746	1.93	New
BBM	Nikalaje Sudhakar Mohanrao	2,695	1.89	▲1.60
BSP	Kureshi Khaled Abdul Gafur	1,982	1.39	▼0.34
Independent	Kshirsagar Shankar Sheshrao	1,472	1.03	New
RSPS	Narayan Appasaheb Chalage	1,250	0.88	New
Nelopa (United)	Khan Feroz Samad	1,079	0.76	New
Margin of victory		20,771	14.58	▲4.68
Turnout		142,610	54.44	▼9.13
Total valid votes		142,501		
Registered electors		261,974		▼1.09
INC gain from SS		Swing	▲0.71	

=== Assembly Election 2004 ===
2004 Maharashtra Legislative Assembly election : Jalna
Party	Candidate	Votes	%	±%
SS	Arjun Khotkar	86,696	51.50	▲6.30
INC	Kailas Kisanrao Gorantyal	70,022	41.59	▼6.48
Independent	Munnawarkhan Gulkhan Pathan	3,292	1.96	New
BSP	Ugale Babasaheb Bhujangrao	2,911	1.73	▲1.27
ABS	Gupta Nandlal Sohanlal	1,301	0.77	New
Independent	Pramod Vittalrao Ratnaparkhe	1,162	0.69	New
Margin of victory		16,674	9.90	▲7.03
Turnout		168,385	63.57	▼3.38
Total valid votes		168,353		
Registered electors		264,867		▲23.34
SS gain from INC		Swing	▲3.43	

=== Assembly Election 1999 ===
1999 Maharashtra Legislative Assembly election : Jalna
Party	Candidate	Votes	%	±%
INC	Kailas Gorantyal	65,001	48.07	▲22.89
SS	Arjun Khotkar	61,117	45.20	▼8.04
NCP	Raut Rajesh Rambhau	5,838	4.32	New
CPI(M)	Anna Swant	1,824	1.35	New
Margin of victory		3,884	2.87	▼25.19
Turnout		143,766	66.95	▼7.90
Total valid votes		135,221		
Registered electors		214,741		▲4.87
INC gain from SS		Swing	▼5.17	

=== Assembly Election 1995 ===
1995 Maharashtra Legislative Assembly election : Jalna
Party	Candidate	Votes	%	±%
SS	Arjun Khotkar	79,387	53.24	▲2.75
INC	Tope Ankushrao Raosaheb	37,543	25.18	▼1.79
BSP	Ferozali Shabbirali Mou	11,844	7.94	▲7.48
Independent	Kishanrao Alias Nanasaheb Deshmukh	9,068	6.08	New
Independent	Golde Raghunath Abaji	3,351	2.25	New
JD	Jain Prakash Shivraj	1,213	0.81	▼9.71
BBM	Khan Javedkhan Banekhan	905	0.61	New
Margin of victory		41,844	28.06	▲4.54
Turnout		153,279	74.85	▲16.53
Total valid votes		149,116		
Registered electors		204,770		▲3.21
SS hold		Swing	▲2.75	

=== Assembly Election 1990 ===
1990 Maharashtra Legislative Assembly election : Jalna
Party	Candidate	Votes	%	±%
SS	Arjun Khotkar	57,226	50.49	New
INC	Bothra Manikchand Jaichandlal	30,566	26.97	▼8.91
JD	Jaiswal Radhakishan Bhaggulal	11,920	10.52	New
BRP	Sawant Trimbakrao Maroti	6,470	5.71	New
ABHM	Soni Badriprasad Harakchand	1,809	1.60	New
Margin of victory		26,660	23.52	▲11.00
Turnout		115,710	58.32	▲10.11
Total valid votes		113,349		
Registered electors		198,397		▲40.53
SS gain from INC		Swing	▲14.61	

=== Assembly Election 1985 ===
1985 Maharashtra Legislative Assembly election : Jalna
Party	Candidate	Votes	%	±%
INC	Dayma Ramkishan Ramchandra	23,809	35.88	New
JP	Jaiswal Radhakishan Bhaggulal	15,499	23.35	New
Independent	Khare Rupabhaiyya Dulichand	13,826	20.83	New
Independent	Bheemashankar Tukaram Shivatare	8,225	12.39	New
Independent	Govind Sudarmrao Ratnaparkhe	2,120	3.19	New
Independent	Yadav Baliram Kanhiyalal	1,015	1.53	New
Independent	Babasaheb Uttamrao Patil Shinde	905	1.36	New
CPI	Syed Ismail Syed Abdul	549	0.83	New
Margin of victory		8,310	12.52	▼16.42
Turnout		68,065	48.21	▲0.21
Total valid votes		66,363		
Registered electors		141,179		▲15.09
INC gain from INC(I)		Swing	▼25.82	

=== Assembly Election 1980 ===
1980 Maharashtra Legislative Assembly election : Jalna
Party	Candidate	Votes	%	±%
INC(I)	Dayma Ramkishan Ramchandra	35,204	61.70	▲12.24
JP	Jaiswal Radhakishan Bhaggulal	18,693	32.76	New
BJP	Udhan Vithalrao Rajaram	1,350	2.37	New
[[Janata Party (Secular) Raj Narain|Janata Party (Secular) Raj Narain]]	Manohar Yadavrao Jalgaonkar	739	1.30	New
[[Janata Party (Secular) Charan Singh|Janata Party (Secular) Charan Singh]]	Shinde Digamber Shrirang	542	0.95	New
Independent	Bhartiya Prakashchand Gopikishan	346	0.61	New
Margin of victory		16,511	28.94	▲2.92
Turnout		58,876	48.00	▼12.49
Total valid votes		57,059		
Registered electors		122,668		▲8.22
INC(I) hold		Swing	▲12.24	

=== Assembly Election 1978 ===
1978 Maharashtra Legislative Assembly election : Jalna
Party	Candidate	Votes	%	±%
INC(I)	Kisanrao Pandharnath Bhise	32,707	49.46	New
JP	Syed Abdul Majeed Syed Abdul Hakim	15,499	23.44	New
PWPI	Kisanrao Chaburao Deshmukh	8,150	12.32	▲7.82
INC	Rakh Shankarrao Raghunathrao	6,091	9.21	▼50.66
Independent	Kuril Bansilal Ramcharan	1,225	1.85	New
Independent	Sharma Ghanshyamdeo Sawsiram	836	1.26	New
Independent	Bhartiya Prakashchand Gopikishan	577	0.87	New
Independent	Kanhaiyalal Ramchandra Gorakshak	437	0.66	New
Margin of victory		17,208	26.02	▼11.83
Turnout		68,563	60.49	▲26.23
Total valid votes		66,130		
Registered electors		113,355		▲88.61
INC(I) gain from INC		Swing	▼10.41	

=== Assembly Election 1962 ===
1962 Maharashtra Legislative Assembly election : Jalna
Party	Candidate	Votes	%	±%
INC	Dattatray Rao Khanderao Deshpande	11,524	59.87	▲3.02
Independent	Bhanudas Gangaram	4,239	22.02	New
Independent	Ghansham Deo Sawairam	1,467	7.62	New
Independent	Bansilal Charan	1,152	5.99	New
PWPI	Sampat Paraji	866	4.50	New
Margin of victory		7,285	37.85	▲23.49
Turnout		20,592	34.26	▼28.23
Total valid votes		19,248		
Registered electors		60,099		▼43.69
INC hold		Swing	▲29.99	

=== Assembly Election 1957 ===
1957 Bombay State Legislative Assembly election : Jalna
Party	Candidate	Votes	%	±%
INC	Dhondirai Ganpatrao	19,926	29.88	▼35.91
INC	Rustumji Bezon$i	17,990	26.97	▼38.82
Independent	Tukaram	10,350	15.52	New
CPI	Gangadharrao Dattatrarao	8,755	13.13	New
ABJS	Ghansham Deo Sawairam	4,143	6.21	▼0.04
Independent	Mangilal Mulchand	2,823	4.23	New
ABJS	Shankarrao	2,706	4.06	▼2.19
Margin of victory		9,576	14.36	▼38.24
Turnout		66,693	62.49	▲23.64
Total valid votes		66,693		
Registered electors		106,725		▲116.77
INC hold		Swing	▼35.91	

=== Assembly Election 1952 ===
1952 Hyderabad State Legislative Assembly election : Jalna
Party	Candidate	Votes	%	±%
INC	Syed Mohammed Moosavi	12,583	65.79	New
PDF	Manohar Narayan	2,522	13.19	New
ABJS	Ghansham Deo Sawairam	1,196	6.25	New
Socialist	Bhaskar Rao	994	5.20	New
PWPI	Rambh Rao Taloji	803	4.20	New
Independent	Mangilal Mulchand	522	2.73	New
Independent	Shivabhai	506	2.65	New
Margin of victory		10,061	52.60	
Turnout		19,126	38.85	
Total valid votes		19,126		
Registered electors		49,234		
INC win (new seat)				
