= Bhokardan Assembly constituency =

Constituency of the Maharashtra legislative assembly in India

Coordinates: 20.25°N 75.77°E

Bhokardan
- Constituency No. 103 for the Maharashtra Legislative Assembly

Constituency details
- Country: India
- Region: Western India
- State: Maharashtra
- Division: Chhatrapati Sambhajinagar
- District: Jalna
- Lok Sabha constituency: Jalna
- Established: 1952
- Total electors: 322,736

Member of Legislative Assembly
- 15th Maharashtra Legislative Assembly
- Incumbent Santosh Danve
- Party: BJP
- Elected year: 2024
- Preceded by: Chandrakant Danve, NCP

Bhokardan Assembly constituency is one of the 288 Vidhan Sabha (legislative assembly) constituencies of Maharashtra state in western India.

== Overview ==
Bhokardan is one of the Vidhan Sabha constituency of Jalna lok sabha constituency along with five other Vidhan Sabha segments, namely Jalna and Badnapur in Jalna district and Sillod, Phulambri and Paithan in Aurangabad district, Maharashtra. It covers the entire Jafarabad tehsil and part of Bhokardan tehsil.

=== Bhokardan Vidhan Sabha constituency Delimitation History ===
Following areas are included in Bhokardan Vidhan Sabha constituency during delimitation every time.

S.No	Delimitation implemented Year	Assembly constituencies Included
1	2008	1. Jafferabad Tehsil, 2. Bhokardan Tehsil (Part), Revenue Circle Dhawada, Pimpalgaon (Renukai), Sipora Bazar, Bhokardan and Bhokardan (MC).

== Members of the Legislative Assembly ==
Election	Member	Party
1952	Dhondiraj Kamble	Indian National Congress
1952	Bhao Rao Dagdu Rao	People's Democratic Front
1957	Bhagwanrao Gade	Indian National Congress
1962	Bhaurao Narsingrao Gawande	Peasants and Workers Party of India
1967	B. J. Kale	Indian National Congress
1972	Bhaurao Narsingrao Gawande	Indian National Congress
1978	Vithalrao Ramsing Patil	Janata Party
1980	Rangnath Shivram Patil	Indian National Congress
1985	Santoshrao Valuba Despute	Indian National Congress
1990	Raosaheb Danve	Bharatiya Janata Party
1995	Raosaheb Danve	Bharatiya Janata Party
1999	Vitthalrao Ramsingh Patil Sapkal	Bharatiya Janata Party
2003 By-election	Chandrakant Danve	Nationalist Congress Party
2004	Chandrakant Danve	Nationalist Congress Party
2009	Chandrakant Danve	Nationalist Congress Party
2014	Santosh Danve	Bharatiya Janata Party
2019	Santosh Danve	Bharatiya Janata Party
2024	Santosh Danve	Bharatiya Janata Party

== Election results ==
=== Assembly Election 2024 ===
2024 Maharashtra Legislative Assembly election : Bhokardan
Party	Candidate	Votes	%	±%
BJP	Santosh Danve	128,480	51.33	▼3.73
NCP-SP	Chandrakant Pundlikrao Danave	105,301	42.07	New
Independent	Keshav Anandrao Janjal	3,699	1.48	New
Independent	Vaishali Suresh Dabhade	2,370	0.95	New
VBA	Dipak Bhimrao Borhade	2,031	0.81	▼3.04
Independent	Keshav Ramkisan Dethe	1,544	0.62	New
NOTA	None of the above	727	0.29	▼0.47
Margin of victory		23,179	9.26	▼5.83
Turnout		251,035	77.78	▲7.02
Total valid votes		250,308		
Registered electors		322,736		▲5.23
BJP hold		Swing	▼3.73	

=== Assembly Election 2019 ===
2019 Maharashtra Legislative Assembly election : Bhokardan
Party	Candidate	Votes	%	±%
BJP	Santosh Danve	118,539	55.06	▲19.58
NCP	Chandrakant Pundlikrao Danave	86,049	39.97	▲7.93
VBA	Dipak Bhimrao Borhade	8,298	3.85	New
NOTA	None of the above	1,629	0.76	▼0.28
Margin of victory		32,490	15.09	▲11.65
Turnout		217,019	70.76	▼3.22
Total valid votes		215,296		
Registered electors		306,696		▲14.41
BJP hold		Swing	▲19.58	

=== Assembly Election 2014 ===
2014 Maharashtra Legislative Assembly election : Bhokardan
Party	Candidate	Votes	%	±%
BJP	Santosh Danve	69,597	35.48	▼4.88
NCP	Chandrakant Pundlikrao Danave	62,847	32.04	▼9.32
SS	Gavhad Ramesh Patilba	36,298	18.50	New
INC	Gavali Suresh Damodhar	5,286	2.69	New
Independent	Pathan Shafikha Mahetabkha	4,762	2.43	New
BSP	Goutam Laxman Mhaske	4,617	2.35	▲1.28
MNS	Wagh Dilip Sheshrao	3,163	1.61	▼2.07
Independent	Dalvi Laxmanrao Khanduji	2,587	1.32	New
NOTA	None of the above	2,041	1.04	New
Margin of victory		6,750	3.44	▲2.44
Turnout		198,316	73.98	▲2.94
Total valid votes		196,169		
Registered electors		268,076		▲16.73
BJP gain from NCP		Swing	▼5.88	

=== Assembly Election 2009 ===
2009 Maharashtra Legislative Assembly election : Bhokardan
Party	Candidate	Votes	%	±%
NCP	Chandrakant Danve	67,480	41.36	▼4.12
BJP	Danve Nirmalabai Raosaheb	65,841	40.36	▼3.18
Independent	Shinde Sarjerao Vithoba	11,163	6.84	New
MNS	Pungale Sandu Santukrao	6,001	3.68	New
Independent	Jadhav Aarun Digambar	3,185	1.95	New
Lok Bharati	Lahane Bhagwanrao Nagorao	2,974	1.82	New
BSP	She. Rauf Isub	1,750	1.07	▼4.31
Independent	Raju Bhagwan Pote	1,369	0.84	New
Margin of victory		1,639	1.00	▼0.94
Turnout		163,141	71.04	▼1.76
Total valid votes		163,141		
Registered electors		229,652		▲3.30
NCP hold		Swing	▼4.12	

=== Assembly Election 2004 ===
2004 Maharashtra Legislative Assembly election : Bhokardan
Party	Candidate	Votes	%	±%
NCP	Chandrakant Danve	73,611	45.48	▼7.00
BJP	Thote Shivajirao Dhondiba	70,472	43.54	▲2.74
BSP	Dalvi Laxmanrao Khanduji	8,701	5.38	New
Independent	Sayyad Mahemad A. Aalam	3,951	2.44	New
Independent	Gaikwad Madhukar Digambar	1,714	1.06	New
Kranti Kari Jai Hind Sena	Bhikaji Rangnath Inche	1,681	1.04	New
Margin of victory		3,139	1.94	▼9.74
Turnout		161,845	72.80	▲6.16
Total valid votes		161,845		
Registered electors		222,325		▲3.41
NCP hold		Swing	▼7.00	

=== Assembly By-election 2003 ===
2003 Maharashtra Legislative Assembly by-election : Bhokardan
Party	Candidate	Votes	%	±%
NCP	Chandrakant Danve	74,918	52.48	▲28.52
BJP	Thote Shivajirao Dhondiba	58,242	40.80	▼0.90
Independent	Sk. Rauf Sk. Yasuf	3,329	2.33	New
Independent	K. Vitthal Punjaji	2,224	1.56	New
Republican Party of India (Democratic)	P. Vitthalrao Ratnaparkhe	2,150	1.51	New
Independent	Ashok Namdeo Sable	1,121	0.79	New
Margin of victory		16,676	11.68	▼6.05
Turnout		143,268	66.64	▼6.12
Total valid votes		142,751		
Registered electors		215,000		▲10.74
NCP gain from BJP		Swing	▲10.78	

=== Assembly Election 1999 ===
1999 Maharashtra Legislative Assembly election : Bhokardan
Party	Candidate	Votes	%	±%
BJP	Vitthalrao Ramsingh Patil Sapkal	52,456	41.70	▼3.01
NCP	Dalvi Laxmanrao Khanduji	30,149	23.96	New
Independent	Janjal Shrirangrao Rangnathrao	26,705	21.23	New
INC	Daspute Santoshrao Waluba	16,497	13.11	▼16.79
Margin of victory		22,307	17.73	▲2.92
Turnout		141,261	72.76	▼6.97
Total valid votes		125,807		
Registered electors		194,156		▲4.58
BJP hold		Swing	▼3.01	

=== Assembly Election 1995 ===
1995 Maharashtra Legislative Assembly election : Bhokardan
Party	Candidate	Votes	%	±%
BJP	Raosaheb Danve	63,561	44.71	▼8.55
INC	Shrirangrao Rangnath Janjal	42,506	29.90	▼1.69
JD	Dalvi Laxmanrao Khanduji	21,024	14.79	▲10.09
BBM	Dandge Kashinath Dhondiba	6,226	4.38	New
Independent	Vithal Dhondiba Chinchpure	4,613	3.24	New
Independent	Kailash Laximan Jagtap	1,307	0.92	New
Independent	Deshmukh Uttamrao Kautikrao	885	0.62	New
Margin of victory		21,055	14.81	▼6.87
Turnout		148,020	79.73	▲10.16
Total valid votes		142,163		
Registered electors		185,658		▲6.93
BJP hold		Swing	▼8.55	

=== Assembly Election 1990 ===
1990 Maharashtra Legislative Assembly election : Bhokardan
Party	Candidate	Votes	%	±%
BJP	Raosaheb Danve	62,684	53.26	▲5.23
INC	Ranganathrao Shivram Janjal	37,174	31.59	▼18.43
Independent	Bhaskar Sadashiv	6,504	5.53	New
JD	Gavhad Ramesh Patilba	5,529	4.70	New
INS(SCS)	Bhagaji Daulat Gavali	2,487	2.11	New
Independent	Babasaheb Uttamrao Patil Shinde	1,314	1.12	New
Doordarshi Party	Mule Kondiba Govindrao	914	0.78	New
Margin of victory		25,510	21.68	▲19.69
Turnout		120,790	69.57	▲10.50
Total valid votes		117,688		
Registered electors		173,618		▲27.03
BJP gain from INC		Swing	▲3.24	

=== Assembly Election 1985 ===
1985 Maharashtra Legislative Assembly election : Bhokardan
Party	Candidate	Votes	%	±%
INC	Santoshrao Valuba Despute	39,446	50.02	New
BJP	Raosaheb Dadarao Danve	37,878	48.03	▲36.98
Independent	Rambhau Vithoba Phuse	1,532	1.94	New
Margin of victory		1,568	1.99	▼4.73
Turnout		80,740	59.07	▲2.12
Total valid votes		78,856		
Registered electors		136,674		▲13.34
INC gain from INC(U)		Swing	▲2.19	

=== Assembly Election 1980 ===
1980 Maharashtra Legislative Assembly election : Bhokardan
Party	Candidate	Votes	%	±%
INC(U)	Rangnath Shivram Janjal	31,889	47.83	New
INC(I)	Santoshrao Valuba Despute	27,408	41.11	▲16.40
BJP	Vithalrao Ramsing Patil	7,368	11.05	New
Margin of victory		4,481	6.72	▼16.01
Turnout		68,671	56.95	▼7.84
Total valid votes		66,665		
Registered electors		120,584		▲8.03
INC(U) gain from JP		Swing	▲0.39	

=== Assembly Election 1978 ===
1978 Maharashtra Legislative Assembly election : Bhokardan
Party	Candidate	Votes	%	±%
JP	Vithalrao Ramsing Sapkal	32,990	47.44	New
INC(I)	Hanumantrao Gawanji Sawant	17,185	24.71	New
INC	Mukundrao Vitthalrao Mirker	14,809	21.29	▼46.25
Independent	Uttamrao Tukaram Salve	2,334	3.36	New
Independent	Babu Kalidas Laxmikantrao Waghmare	2,225	3.20	New
Margin of victory		15,805	22.73	▼12.36
Turnout		72,320	64.79	▲16.97
Total valid votes		69,543		
Registered electors		111,621		▲12.60
JP gain from INC		Swing	▼20.10	

=== Assembly Election 1972 ===
1972 Maharashtra Legislative Assembly election : Bhokardan
Party	Candidate	Votes	%	±%
INC	Bhaurao Narsingrao Gawande	30,817	67.54	▲16.15
ABJS	Pundlik Hari Danve	14,809	32.46	▲4.99
Margin of victory		16,008	35.09	▲11.17
Turnout		47,401	47.82	▼3.95
Total valid votes		45,626		
Registered electors		99,131		▲9.65
INC hold		Swing	▲16.15	

=== Assembly Election 1967 ===
1967 Maharashtra Legislative Assembly election : Bhokardan
Party	Candidate	Votes	%	±%
INC	Baburao J. Kale	22,566	51.39	▲20.58
ABJS	Pundlik Hari Danve	12,063	27.47	New
RPI	S. Gangaram	4,838	11.02	New
Independent	S. Mothombre	1,741	3.96	New
Independent	B. R. Kureel	1,461	3.33	New
Independent	P. B. Salve	1,241	2.83	New
Margin of victory		10,503	23.92	▼7.59
Turnout		46,807	51.77	▼7.04
Total valid votes		43,910		
Registered electors		90,407		▼3.81
INC gain from PWPI		Swing	▼10.93	

=== Assembly Election 1962 ===
1962 Maharashtra Legislative Assembly election : Bhokardan
Party	Candidate	Votes	%	±%
PWPI	Bhaurao Narsingrao Gawande	32,161	62.32	New
INC	Bhagwantrao Gambhirrao	15,899	30.81	▼19.59
Independent	Gangaram Waman	3,550	6.88	New
Margin of victory		16,262	31.51	▲12.57
Turnout		55,275	58.81	▲19.61
Total valid votes		51,610		
Registered electors		93,985		▲31.14
PWPI gain from INC		Swing	▲11.92	

=== Assembly Election 1957 ===
1957 Bombay State Legislative Assembly election : Bhokardan
Party	Candidate	Votes	%	±%
INC	Gade Bhagwant Rao	14,161	50.40	▲8.02
Independent	Bhao Rao Dagdu Rao	8,840	31.46	New
Independent	Dagdu Sataji	5,094	18.13	New
Margin of victory		5,321	18.94	▲14.12
Turnout		28,095	39.20	▼44.18
Total valid votes		28,095		
Registered electors		71,668		▼35.58
INC hold		Swing	▲26.80	

=== Assembly Election 1952 ===
1952 Hyderabad State Legislative Assembly election : Bhokardan
Party	Candidate	Votes	%	±%
INC	Dhondiraj Kamble	21,895	23.60	New
PDF	Bhao Rao Dagdu Rao	21,024	22.66	New
INC	Vankat Rao Jadhav	17,420	18.78	New
SCF	Balkrishna Shivaram	15,955	17.20	New
Independent	Saheb Rao Ganga Rao	5,576	6.01	New
Socialist	Eknath Narsinh	4,865	5.24	New
Hyderabad State Depressed Classes Association	Dhakaleswar Maccaji	3,380	3.64	New
Independent	Devi Das Viswanath	2,646	2.85	New
Margin of victory		4,475	4.82	
Turnout		92,761	41.69	
Total valid votes		92,761		
Registered electors		111,250		
INC win (new seat)				

== See also ==
- Bhokardan
- List of constituencies of Maharashtra Vidhan Sabha
