= Khasgaon =

Village in Maharashtra

- Village
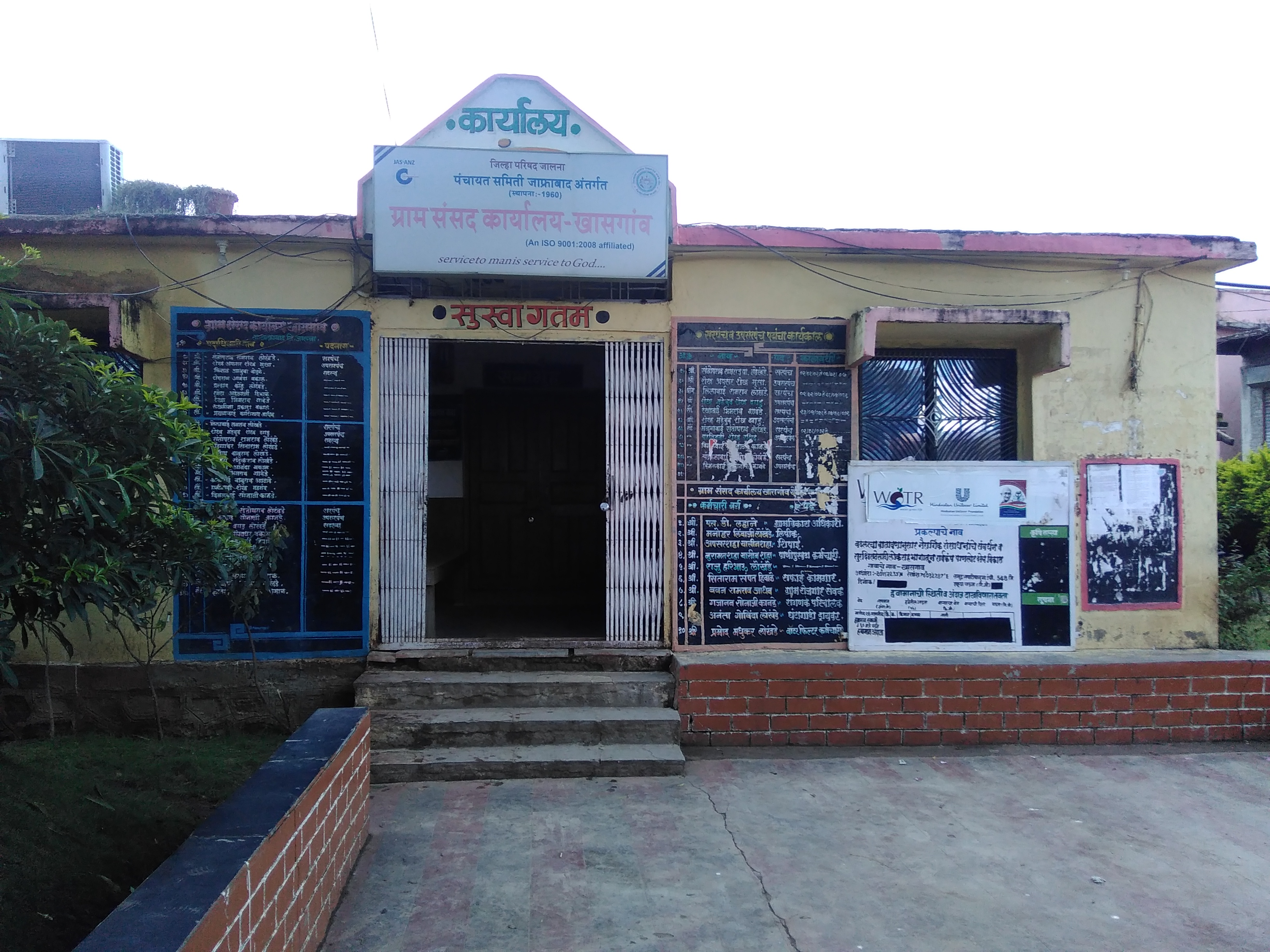
- Grampanchayat of Khasgaon

- Location in Maharashtra, India Khasgaon (India)
- Coordinates: 20.256°N 76.058°E
- Country: India
- State: Maharashtra
- Region: Marathwada
- District: Jalna

Population (2011)
  - Total: 3,573
  - Male: 1,878
  - Female: 1,695
- Demonym: Khasgoankar
- PIN: 431206
- Official Language: Marathi

Khasgaon is a developing village in Jafrabad tehsil of Jalna district in the state of Maharashtra, India. The Khasgaon village has population of 3,573 of which 1,878 are males while 1,695 are females as per Population Census 2011.

This village is the first place in the cleanliness campaign and the village is named as First Village in the Jafrabad taluka of Smart Gram (Adarsh Gaon). On 13 May 2017 Maharashtra's Chief Minister Devendra Fadnavis and some other Ministers visited these villages.

== Sex ratio ==
In Khasgaon village population of children with age 0-6 is 494 which makes up 13.83% of total population of village. Average Sex Ratio of Khasgaon village is 903 which is lower than Maharashtra state average of 929. Child Sex Ratio for the Khasgaon as per census is 758, lower than Maharashtra average of 894.

== Literacy rate ==
In 2011, literacy rate of Khasgaon village was 74.37% compared to 82.34% of Maharashtra. In Khasgaon Male literacy stands at 86.16% while female literacy rate was 61.67%.

== Demographics ==
Per the 2011 Census of India, Khasgaon has a total population of 3573 people; 1878 of those male and 1695 female.
