= Paithan Assembly constituency =

Constituency of the Maharashtra legislative assembly in India

Coordinates: 19.48°N 75.38°E

Paithan
- Constituency No. 110 for the Maharashtra Legislative Assembly

Constituency details
- Country: India
- Region: Western India
- State: Maharashtra
- Division: Aurangabad
- District: Aurangabad
- Lok Sabha constituency: Jalna
- Established: 1955
- Total electors: 325,485
- Reservation: None

Member of Legislative Assembly
- 15th Maharashtra Legislative Assembly
- Incumbent Vilas Sandipanrao Bhumre
- Party: SHS
- Alliance: NDA
- Elected year: 2024

Paithan Assembly constituency is one of the 288 Vidhan Sabha (legislative assembly) constituencies of Maharashtra state in western India.

== Overview ==
Paithan is part of Jalna Lok Sabha constituency along with five other Vidhan Sabha constituencies, namely Badnapur, Jalna and Bhokardan in Jalna district and Sillod and Phulambri in Aurangabad district.

== Members of Legislative Assembly ==
Year	Member	Party
1957	Jadhav Venkat Rao	Indian National Congress
1962	Kalyanrao Pandharinath Shisode	Indian National Congress
1967	Kalyanrao Pandharinath Shisode	Indian National Congress
1972	Kalyanrao Pandharinath Shisode	Indian National Congress
1978	Bhaurao Abaji Thorat	Janata Party
1980	Kale Shivajirao Sahebrao	Indian National Congress
1985	Chandrakant Sonaki Ghodke	Indian Congress
1990	Appasaheb Alias Babanrao Waghchaure	Shiv Sena
1995	Sandipanrao Asaram Bhumare	Shiv Sena
1999	Sandipanrao Asaram Bhumare	Shiv Sena
2004	Sandipanrao Asaram Bhumare	Shiv Sena
2009	Raosaheb alias Sanjay Waghchaure	Nationalist Congress Party
2014	Sandipanrao Asaram Bhumare	Shiv Sena
2019	Sandipanrao Asaram Bhumare	Shiv Sena
2024	Vilas Sandipan Bhumre	Shiv Sena

== Election results ==
=== Assembly Election 2024 ===
2024 Maharashtra Legislative Assembly election : Paithan
Party	Candidate	Votes	%	±%
SS	Vilas Sandipan Bhumre	132,474	52.31%	▲12.83
SS(UBT)	Dattatray Radhakisan Gorde	103,282	40.78%	New
RSPS	Prakash Uttamrao Dilvale	6,334	2.50%	New
VBA	Arun Sonaji Ghodke	3,187	1.26%	▼8.52
Independent	Waman Ramrao Sathe	1,669	0.66%	New
NOTA	None of the Above	1,475	0.58%	▼0.36
Margin of victory		29,192	11.53%	▲4.83
Turnout		254,726	78.26%	▲5.96
Total valid votes		253,251		
Registered electors		325,485		▲10.69
SS hold		Swing	▲12.83	

=== Assembly Election 2019 ===
2019 Maharashtra Legislative Assembly election : Paithan
Party	Candidate	Votes	%	±%
SS	Sandipanrao Asaram Bhumare	83,403	39.48%	▲4.71
NCP	Dattatray Radhakisan Gorde	69,264	32.78%	▲11.01
VBA	Chavhan Vijay Ambadas	20,654	9.78%	New
AIMIM	Pralhad Dhondiram Rathod	17,212	8.15%	New
Independent	Dhondibhau Bhimbhau Pujari	11,437	5.41%	New
NOTA	None of the Above	1,998	0.95%	▲0.23
BSP	Vijay Rangnath Gavali	1,497	0.71%	New
Independent	Sukhdev Rakhmaji Ban	1,279	0.61%	New
Margin of victory		14,139	6.69%	▼6.30
Turnout		213,336	72.55%	▼1.64
Total valid votes		211,271		
Registered electors		294,058		▲12.16
SS hold		Swing	▲4.71	

=== Assembly Election 2014 ===
2014 Maharashtra Legislative Assembly election : Paithan
Party	Candidate	Votes	%	±%
SS	Sandipanrao Asaram Bhumare	66,991	34.77%	▲3.01
NCP	Waghchaure Sanjay Yadavrao	41,952	21.78%	▼18.58
BJP	Hiwale Vinayak Laxman	29,957	15.55%	New
INC	Kale Ravindra Shivajirao	24,957	12.95%	New
MNS	Sunil Shivaji Shinde	7,091	3.68%	▼11.90
Independent	Chormale Ramnath Khushalrao	5,867	3.05%	New
Independent	Shaikh Abbas Shaikh Kasam	5,009	2.60%	New
NOTA	None of the Above	1,382	0.72%	New
Margin of victory		25,039	13.00%	▲4.41
Turnout		194,135	74.05%	▲4.40
Total valid votes		192,660		
Registered electors		262,167		▲13.89
SS gain from NCP		Swing	▼5.59	

=== Assembly Election 2009 ===
2009 Maharashtra Legislative Assembly election : Paithan
Party	Candidate	Votes	%	±%
NCP	Sanjay Waghchaure	64,179	40.36%	▲22.86
SS	Sandipanrao Asaram Bhumare	50,517	31.77%	▼7.91
MNS	Sunil Shivaji Shinde	24,778	15.58%	New
RSPS	Pralhad Dhondiba Rathod	7,925	4.98%	New
Independent	Pawar Lahu Kashinath	2,436	1.53%	New
ANC	Gazi Allauddin Bashiroddin	1,778	1.12%	New
Independent	Pathan Anwarkha Yunuskha	1,659	1.04%	New
Margin of victory		13,662	8.59%	▲4.39
Turnout		159,029	69.08%	▼1.73
Total valid votes		159,028		
Registered electors		230,197		▲33.45
NCP gain from SS		Swing	▲0.68	

=== Assembly Election 2004 ===
2004 Maharashtra Legislative Assembly election : Paithan
Party	Candidate	Votes	%	±%
SS	Sandipanrao Asaram Bhumare	48,462	39.68%	▼9.03
Independent	Shinde Sunil Shivaji	43,336	35.48%	New
NCP	Jhargad Kachru Pandharinath	21,375	17.50%	▼5.77
BSP	Arun Shamrao Jadhav	6,683	5.47%	New
Prabuddha Republican Party	Zine Laxman Bhaguji	2,288	1.87%	New
Margin of victory		5,126	4.20%	▼17.92
Turnout		122,156	70.82%	▲8.18
Total valid votes		122,144		
Registered electors		172,499		▲9.02
SS hold		Swing	▼9.03	

=== Assembly Election 1999 ===
1999 Maharashtra Legislative Assembly election : Paithan
Party	Candidate	Votes	%	±%
SS	Sandipanrao Asaram Bhumare	48,266	48.71%	▲9.66
INC	Appasaheb Ramkrishna Patil	26,349	26.59%	▲3.80
NCP	Waghchoure Sanjay Alias Raosaheb Yadavrao	23,056	23.27%	New
Independent	Wahule Uttamrao Sonaji	720	0.73%	New
Independent	Gorde Pandharinath Satwaji	697	0.70%	New
Margin of victory		21,917	22.12%	▲5.86
Turnout		109,152	68.98%	▼3.63
Total valid votes		99,088		
Registered electors		158,227		▼6.53
SS hold		Swing	▲9.66	

=== Assembly Election 1995 ===
1995 Maharashtra Legislative Assembly election : Paithan
Party	Candidate	Votes	%	±%
SS	Sandipanrao Asaram Bhumare	43,802	39.05%	▼15.58
INC	Aute Kantrao Vishwanathrao	25,569	22.80%	▲5.18
JD	Shisode Sudamrao Pandharinath	12,417	11.07%	New
BSP	Shaikh Abdul Harun Abdul Samad	10,509	9.37%	New
Independent	Kulkarni Narsinh Laxmanrao	4,205	3.75%	New
Independent	Kale Shivajirao Sahebrao	2,868	2.56%	New
Independent	Paralkar Bhaurao Topaji	2,025	1.81%	New
Margin of victory		18,233	16.26%	▼19.80
Turnout		116,673	68.92%	▲9.08
Total valid votes		112,162		
Registered electors		169,287		▲9.54
SS hold		Swing	▼15.58	

=== Assembly Election 1990 ===
1990 Maharashtra Legislative Assembly election : Paithan
Party	Candidate	Votes	%	±%
SS	Appasaheb Alias Babanrao Waghchaure	48,273	54.64%	New
PWPI	K. P. Zargad (Mamma)	16,419	18.58%	New
INC	Chandrakant Sonajirao Ghodke	15,564	17.62%	▼15.87
Independent	Baliram Chagan Rathod	2,272	2.57%	New
Independent	Ibrahim Pathan	1,832	2.07%	New
Lokdal (B)	Idriskhan Gulam Mohemoodkhan Pathan	1,447	1.64%	New
Independent	Kharat Gautam Bhagaji	873	0.99%	New
Margin of victory		31,854	36.05%	▲23.30
Turnout		90,492	58.56%	▲3.53
Total valid votes		88,355		
Registered electors		154,537		▲27.22
SS gain from IC(S)		Swing	▲8.40	

=== Assembly Election 1985 ===
1985 Maharashtra Legislative Assembly election : Paithan
Party	Candidate	Votes	%	±%
IC(S)	Chandrakant Sonaki Ghodke	30,124	46.23%	New
INC	Mohan Anandrao Deshmukh	21,816	33.48%	New
Independent	Gangadhar Gade	4,948	7.59%	New
Independent	Appasaheb Uttamrao Waghchaure	3,868	5.94%	New
Independent	Bhagwat Bapasaheb Landge	3,753	5.76%	New
Independent	Bhaurao Abaji Thorat	649	1.00%	New
Margin of victory		8,308	12.75%	▼8.81
Turnout		66,737	54.94%	▲0.01
Total valid votes		65,158		
Registered electors		121,474		▲13.96
IC(S) gain from INC(I)		Swing	▼2.29	

=== Assembly Election 1980 ===
1980 Maharashtra Legislative Assembly election : Paithan
Party	Candidate	Votes	%	±%
INC(I)	Kale Shivajirao Sahebrao	27,739	48.52%	▲23.87
INC(U)	Chandrakant Sonaki Ghodke	15,413	26.96%	New
BJP	Thorat Bhaurao Abaji	12,831	22.45%	New
Independent	Kadu Dhondiram Ranyewale	735	1.29%	New
Margin of victory		12,326	21.56%	▲19.00
Turnout		59,030	55.38%	▼7.64
Total valid votes		57,165		
Registered electors		106,596		▲8.71
INC(I) gain from JP		Swing	▲21.30	

=== Assembly Election 1978 ===
1978 Maharashtra Legislative Assembly election : Paithan
Party	Candidate	Votes	%	±%
JP	Bhaurao Abaji Thorat	16,355	27.22%	New
INC(I)	Shivajirao Sahebrao	14,813	24.66%	New
INC	Kalyanrao Pandharinathrao	11,742	19.54%	▼59.00
Independent	Kashinathrao Pralhadrao	6,574	10.94%	New
Independent	Sk. Kadar Sk. Ibrahim	5,006	8.33%	New
PWPI	Sharad Pandirao Gavane	2,396	3.99%	▲0.06
Independent	Vasant Punjaji Narwade	2,282	3.80%	New
Margin of victory		1,542	2.57%	▼65.93
Turnout		62,343	63.58%	▲8.08
Total valid votes		60,081		
Registered electors		98,058		▲0.03
JP gain from INC		Swing	▼51.32	

=== Assembly Election 1972 ===
1972 Maharashtra Legislative Assembly election : Paithan
Party	Candidate	Votes	%	±%
INC	Kalyanrao Pandhorinath	40,953	78.55%	▲13.02
RPI	Uttam Sonaji	5,238	10.05%	New
INC(O)	Eknath Bhagwant Rao	3,898	7.48%	New
PWPI	Sharad Panditrao Gavane	2,050	3.93%	New
Margin of victory		35,715	68.50%	▲29.27
Turnout		55,121	56.23%	▲3.97
Total valid votes		52,139		
Registered electors		98,028		▲25.84
INC hold		Swing	▲13.02	

=== Assembly Election 1967 ===
1967 Maharashtra Legislative Assembly election : Paithan
Party	Candidate	Votes	%	±%
INC	Kalyanrao Pandhorinath	25,123	65.52%	▲5.87
Independent	K. Marutirao	10,080	26.29%	New
ABJS	G. Abaji	3,139	8.19%	New
Margin of victory		15,043	39.23%	▲8.72
Turnout		42,452	54.49%	▲11.00
Total valid votes		38,342		
Registered electors		77,901		▲4.60
INC hold		Swing	▲5.87	

=== Assembly Election 1962 ===
1962 Maharashtra Legislative Assembly election : Paithan
Party	Candidate	Votes	%	±%
INC	Kalyanrao Pandhorinath	16,980	59.65%	▲0.01
PSP	Kashinath (Babanrao ) Pralhadrao Kulkarni	8,293	29.13%	New
PWPI	Khushalrao Bapurao Motale	3,192	11.21%	▼21.96
Margin of victory		8,687	30.52%	▲4.05
Turnout		30,956	41.56%	▲6.99
Total valid votes		28,465		
Registered electors		74,477		▲13.58
INC hold		Swing	▲0.01	

=== Assembly Election 1957 ===
1957 Bombay State Legislative Assembly election : Paithan
Party	Candidate	Votes	%	±%
INC	Jadhav Venkat Rao	12,213	59.64%	New
PWPI	Shankar Rao	6,793	33.17%	New
Independent	Gopinath (Sc)	1,472	7.19%	New
Margin of victory		5,420	26.47%	
Turnout		20,478	31.23%	
Total valid votes		20,478		
Registered electors		65,575		
INC win (new seat)				
