= Baburao Kale =

Indian politician

Member of Parliament, Lok Sabha
- In office 1971-1977
- Preceded by: V.N. Jadhav
- Succeeded by: Pundlik Hari Danve
- Constituency: Jalna

Personal details
- Born: 25 August 1926
- Party: Indian National Congress
- Spouse: Gangubai

Baburao Janglu Kale was an Indian politician. He was elected to the Lok Sabha, the lower house of the Parliament of India as a member of the Indian National Congress.
