= Badnapur Assembly constituency =

Constituency in the state of Maharashtra in India

Coordinates: 19.87°N 75.72°E

Badnapur
- Constituency No. 102 for the Maharashtra Legislative Assembly

Constituency details
- Country: India
- Region: Western India
- State: Maharashtra
- Division: Aurangabad
- District: Jalna
- Lok Sabha constituency: Jalna
- Established: 1978
- Total electors: 333,282
- Reservation: SC

Member of Legislative Assembly
- 15th Maharashtra Legislative Assembly
- Incumbent Narayan Tilakchand Kuche
- Party: BJP
- Elected year: 2024
- Preceded by: Santosh Pundalik Sambre

Badnapur Assembly constituency is one of the 288 Vidhan Sabha (legislative assembly) constituencies of Maharashtra state in western India.

== Overview ==
Badnapur is part of Jalna Lok Sabha constituency along with five other Vidhan Sabha segments, namely, Jalna and Bhokardan in Jalna district and Sillod, Phulambri and Paithan in Aurangabad district.

== Members of Legislative Assembly ==
Year	Member	Party
1962	Dhakaleshwar Makaji	Indian National Congress
1978	Kolkar Shankarrao Limbajirao	Indian National Congress
1980	Sharma Shakuntala Nandkishor	Indian National Congress
1985	Appasaheb Sheshrao Chavan	Indian Congress
1990	Chavan Narayanrao Satwaji	Shiv Sena
1995	Chavan Narayanrao Satwaji	Shiv Sena
1999	Chavan Narayanrao Satwaji	Shiv Sena
2004	Arvind Bajirao Chavan	Nationalist Congress Party
2009	Santosh Vasantlal Sambre	Shiv Sena
2014	Narayan Tilakchand Kuche	Bharatiya Janata Party
2019	Narayan Tilakchand Kuche	Bharatiya Janata Party
2024	Narayan Tilakchand Kuche	Bharatiya Janata Party

== Election results ==
=== Assembly Election 2024 ===
2024 Maharashtra Legislative Assembly election : Badnapur
Party	Candidate	Votes	%	±%
BJP	Narayan Tilakchand Kuche	138,489	55.76%	▲5.56
NCP-SP	Bablu Nehrulal Choudhary	92,958	37.42%	New
VBA	Satish Shankarrao Kharat	4,965	2.00%	▼2.70
Peoples Party of India (Democratic)	Shailendra Sudam Misal	4,574	1.84%	New
NOTA	None of the Above	1,122	0.45%	▼0.38
Margin of victory		45,531	18.33%	▲9.46
Turnout		2,49,509	74.86%	▲6.40
Total valid votes		2,48,387		
Registered electors		3,33,282		▲8.22
BJP hold		Swing	▲5.56	

=== Assembly Election 2019 ===
2019 Maharashtra Legislative Assembly election : Badnapur
Party	Candidate	Votes	%	±%
BJP	Narayan Tilakchand Kuche	105,312	50.19%	▲10.70
NCP	Choudhari Rupkumar Alias Bablu Nehrulal	86,700	41.32%	▲14.44
VBA	Rajendra Magre	9,869	4.70%	New
Independent	Dr. Ashvini Sadashiv Gaikwad	1,881	0.90%	New
NOTA	None of the Above	1,753	0.84%	▲0.12
MNS	Bhosle Rajendra Raghunath	1,643	0.78%	▼2.78
Margin of victory		18,612	8.87%	▼3.74
Turnout		2,11,627	68.72%	▲0.82
Total valid votes		2,09,824		
Registered electors		3,07,973		▲11.29
BJP hold		Swing	▲10.70	

=== Assembly Election 2014 ===
2014 Maharashtra Legislative Assembly election : Badnapur
Party	Candidate	Votes	%	±%
BJP	Narayan Tilakchand Kuche	73,560	39.49%	New
NCP	Chaudhari Roopkumar(Bablu) Nehrulal	50,065	26.88%	▲2.37
SS	Santosh Vasantlal Sambre	30,945	16.61%	▼20.31
INC	Subhash Damodhar Magare	13,007	6.98%	New
MNS	Gaikwad Dnyaneshwar Maroti (Mauli)	6,645	3.57%	▼20.01
Republican Sena	Admane Shivaji Janardhan	4,524	2.43%	New
BSP	Salve Vishvjeet Chakradhar	2,187	1.17%	▼2.08
NOTA	None of the Above	1,331	0.71%	New
Margin of victory		23,495	12.61%	▲0.20
Turnout		1,87,626	67.80%	▲5.26
Total valid votes		1,86,271		
Registered electors		2,76,737		▲12.74
BJP gain from SS		Swing	▲2.57	

=== Assembly Election 2009 ===
2009 Maharashtra Legislative Assembly election : Badnapur
Party	Candidate	Votes	%	±%
SS	Santosh Vasantlal Sambre	56,242	36.93%	▲4.00
NCP	Sudamrao Sandu Sadashive	37,334	24.51%	▼13.55
MNS	Chaudhari Roopkumar(Bablu) Nehrulal	35,908	23.58%	New
BSP	Dolse Vilas Chokhaji	4,951	3.25%	▼0.48
RPI(A)	Chavan Bramhanand Sakharam	4,851	3.18%	New
Independent	Sarjerao Baburao Jadhav	3,465	2.27%	New
Independent	Adv. Mohan Dhonduji Tayde	2,010	1.32%	New
Margin of victory		18,908	12.41%	▲7.28
Turnout		1,52,323	62.06%	▼10.73
Total valid votes		1,52,311		
Registered electors		2,45,459		▲20.26
SS gain from NCP		Swing	▼1.13	

=== Assembly Election 2004 ===
2004 Maharashtra Legislative Assembly election : Badnapur
Party	Candidate	Votes	%	±%
NCP	Arvind Bajirao Chavan	56,539	38.06%	▲28.26
SS	Ghuge Bhanudas Ambuji	48,910	32.92%	▼1.86
Independent	Shinde Kalpana Sarjerao	22,683	15.27%	New
BSP	Dr. Misal Shrimantrao Sakharam	5,548	3.73%	New
Independent	Hivrale Tukaram Shankar	4,309	2.90%	New
BBM	Dale Kalyan Harichandra	2,037	1.37%	▼18.39
Independent	Satish Ankushrao Deshmukh	1,949	1.31%	New
Margin of victory		7,629	5.14%	▼8.40
Turnout		1,48,560	72.78%	▲8.71
Total valid votes		1,48,559		
Registered electors		2,04,112		▲15.08
NCP gain from SS		Swing	▲3.27	

=== Assembly Election 1999 ===
1999 Maharashtra Legislative Assembly election : Badnapur
Party	Candidate	Votes	%	±%
SS	Chavan Narayanrao Satwaji	39,531	34.79%	▲1.09
Independent	Chavan Arvind Bajirao	24,153	21.25%	New
BBM	Admane Shivaji Janardhan	22,460	19.77%	▲10.42
Independent	Ghuge Ekanath Ambuji	11,666	10.27%	New
NCP	Dhanure Panditrao Saluji	11,139	9.80%	New
ABS	Pungle Tulshiram Sandu	3,309	2.91%	New
Independent	Giram Babanrao Balabhau	724	0.64%	New
Margin of victory		15,378	13.53%	▼0.33
Turnout		1,27,729	72.02%	▼12.64
Total valid votes		1,13,635		
Registered electors		1,77,359		▲3.37
SS hold		Swing	▲1.09	

=== Assembly Election 1995 ===
1995 Maharashtra Legislative Assembly election : Badnapur
Party	Candidate	Votes	%	±%
SS	Chavan Narayanrao Satwaji	44,354	33.70%	▲4.92
Independent	Pawar Balasaheb Ramrao	26,105	19.83%	New
INC	Arvind Bajirao Chavan	16,902	12.84%	▼1.62
BBM	Admane Shivaji Janardhan	12,299	9.34%	New
JD	Ratnaparkhe Sudhakar Gulabrao	8,376	6.36%	▼1.61
Independent	Appasaheb Sheshrao Chavan	5,064	3.85%	New
Maharashtra Rashtrawadi Congress	Shinde Marotrao Balaji	3,732	2.84%	New
Margin of victory		18,249	13.87%	▲0.45
Turnout		1,36,736	79.69%	▲14.53
Total valid votes		1,31,616		
Registered electors		1,71,576		▲3.41
SS hold		Swing	▲4.92	

=== Assembly Election 1990 ===
1990 Maharashtra Legislative Assembly election : Badnapur
Party	Candidate	Votes	%	±%
SS	Chavan Narayanrao Satwaji	29,696	28.78%	New
Independent	Appasaheb Sheshrao Chavan	15,858	15.37%	New
INC	Bhandarage Dnyanshar Rangnath	14,925	14.47%	▼19.92
BRP	Admane Shivaji Janardhan	10,087	9.78%	New
JD	Kolhe Bhaurao Dhondiba	8,228	7.97%	New
Independent	Palve Bhanudas Bhikaji	5,844	5.66%	New
Independent	Rathod Kailash Fakira	5,348	5.18%	New
Margin of victory		13,838	13.41%	▼6.51
Turnout		1,06,414	64.14%	▲6.98
Total valid votes		1,03,173		
Registered electors		1,65,913		▲25.14
SS gain from IC(S)		Swing	▼25.52	

=== Assembly Election 1985 ===
1985 Maharashtra Legislative Assembly election : Badnapur
Party	Candidate	Votes	%	±%
IC(S)	Appasaheb Sheshrao Chavan	39,747	54.31%	New
INC	Bhandarage Dnyanshar Rangnath	25,164	34.38%	New
Independent	Ratnaparkhe Ramrao Bhikandas	3,034	4.15%	New
Independent	Shivaji Janardhan Admane	2,192	2.99%	New
Independent	Chavan Bramhanand Sakharam	2,002	2.74%	New
Independent	Babasaheb Uttamrao Shinde	1,051	1.44%	New
Margin of victory		14,583	19.92%	▲9.87
Turnout		75,654	57.06%	▲11.47
Total valid votes		73,190		
Registered electors		1,32,578		▲9.46
IC(S) gain from INC(I)		Swing	▲11.39	

=== Assembly Election 1980 ===
1980 Maharashtra Legislative Assembly election : Badnapur
Party	Candidate	Votes	%	±%
INC(I)	Sharma Shakuntala Nandkishor	22,733	42.91%	▲7.00
INC(U)	Jarhad Baburao Ambadas	17,404	32.85%	New
Independent	Rakh Shankarrao Raghunathrao	10,860	20.50%	New
Independent	Shinde Babasaheb Uttamrao	1,124	2.12%	New
[[Janata Party (Secular) Charan Singh|Janata Party (Secular) Charan Singh]]	Batheja Ghanshamdas Shriramchand	581	1.10%	New
Margin of victory		5,329	10.06%	▼5.30
Turnout		55,088	45.48%	▼14.63
Total valid votes		52,975		
Registered electors		1,21,122		▲8.19
INC(I) hold		Swing	▲7.00	

=== Assembly Election 1978 ===
1978 Maharashtra Legislative Assembly election : Badnapur
Party	Candidate	Votes	%	±%
INC(I)	Kolkar Shankarrao Limbajirao	23,466	35.91%	New
JP	Bundele Shankarsing Ghagansing	13,429	20.55%	New
PWPI	Chavan Bajirao Sheshrao	9,883	15.12%	New
INC	Daulatrao Bapurao	8,281	12.67%	▼52.20
Independent	Govind Chandu	4,846	7.42%	New
Independent	Kharat Daulatrao	2,664	4.08%	New
Independent	Gitaram Trimbak	1,217	1.86%	New
Margin of victory		10,037	15.36%	▼14.38
Turnout		68,279	60.99%	▲23.02
Total valid votes		65,349		
Registered electors		1,11,954		▲56.97
INC(I) gain from INC		Swing	▼28.96	

=== Assembly Election 1962 ===
1962 Maharashtra Legislative Assembly election : Badnapur
Party	Candidate	Votes	%	±%
INC	Dhakaleshwar Makaji	16,357	64.87%	New
RPI	T. G. Kharat	8,859	35.13%	New
Margin of victory		7,498	29.74%	
Turnout		27,227	38.17%	
Total valid votes		25,216		
Registered electors		71,322		
INC win (new seat)				
