= Kailas Gorantyal =

Indian politician

- कैलास गोरंटयाल

Member of Maharashtra Legislative Assembly
- In office (1999-2004), (2009-2014), (2019 – 2024)
- Preceded by: Arjun Khotkar
- Succeeded by: Arjun Khotkar
- Constituency: Jalna Assembly constituency

Personal details
- Born: 9 April 1965 (age 61) Jalna, Maharashtra
- Party: Bharatiya Janata Party (Since Aug 2025)
- Other political affiliations: Indian National Congress (Till July 2025)
- Spouse: Sangita Gorantyal
- Children: Akshay Gorantyal
- Parent: Kisanrao Vyankayya Gorantyal
- Education: 10th Pass S.S.C, From Shree Mahavir Sthnakvasi Jain Vidhylay, Jalna, In March 1979 & Graduate From Dr. Babasaheb Ambedkar Marathwada University In 1987
- Occupation: Farming and Business
- Profession: Politician
- Salary: ₹350,000 (US$4,100) (incl. allowances) per month

Kailas Gorantyal is a member of the Bhartiya Janta Party(BJP). He left the Indian National Congress in Aug 2025

== Positions held ==
- 1999: Elected to Maharashtra Legislative Assembly (1st term)
- 2009: Re-Elected to Maharashtra Legislative Assembly (2nd term)
- 2019: Re-Elected to Maharashtra Legislative Assembly (3rd term)
