= Sandipanrao Bhumre =

Indian politician

Sandipanrao Bhumre Patil

Cabinet Minister Government of Maharashtra
- In office 30 December 2019 – 4 June 2024
- Minister: Employment Guarantee; Horticulture
- Governor: Bhagat Singh Koshyari; Ramesh Bais; C. P. Radhakrishnan
- Chief Minister: Uddhav Thackeray; Eknath Shinde
- Deputy CM: Devendra Fadnavis(2022-2024); Ajit Pawar
- Guardian minister: Aurangabad District (2022-2024)
- Preceded by: Shankarrao Gadakh; Subhash Desai (28 Nov 2019 – 30 Dec 2019); Jaydattaji Kshirsagar (9 June 2019 – 8 Nov 2019)
- Succeeded by: Shankarrao Gadakh

Member of Maharashtra Legislative Assembly
- In office (1995-2009), (2014–2024)
- Preceded by: Babanrao Waghchaure alias Appasaheb(1990-95); Raosaheb alias Sanjay Waghchaure(2009-14)
- Succeeded by: Sanjay Waghchaure alias Raosaheb(2009-14); Vilas Sandipan Bhumre(2024-)
- Constituency: Paithan

Member of Parliament, Lok Sabha
- Incumbent
- Assumed office 4 June 2024
- Preceded by: Imtiyaz Jaleel
- Constituency: Aurangabad

Personal details
- Born: 13 July 1963 (age 63) Paithan, Maharashtra, India
- Party: Shiv Sena
- Spouse: Pushpatai Bhumre
- Children: 3
- Occupation: Politician
- Cabinet: Eknath Shinde ministry Uddhav Thackeray ministry

Sandipanrao Asaram Bhumare Patil is an Indian politician from Maharashtra. He is a leader of the Shiv Sena from Aurangabad. Currently, since June 2024, he is serving as Member of Parliament from Aurangabad Lok Sabha constituency. Before that, he was a five time MLA from Paithan Assembly constituency.

== Career ==
Bhumare has been elected to the Vidhan Sabha for six terms in 1995, 1999, 2004, 2014 and 2019 before his son took over. He was the Chairman of Shri Renukadevi Sharad Sahakari Sakhar Karkhana Limited, Vihamandwa. He also previously served as the Minister of Employment Guarantee of Maharashtra under Uddhav Thackeray & Eknath Shinde ministries during 2019 to 2024. During the period, he also served as the Guardian Minister of Chhatrapati Sambhajinagar (Aurangabad) and Yavatmal districts.

== Positions held ==
- 1995: Elected to Maharashtra Legislative Assembly (1st term)
- 1999: Re-elected to Maharashtra Legislative Assembly (2nd term)
- 2004: Re-elected to Maharashtra Legislative Assembly (3rd term)
- 2014: Re-elected to Maharashtra Legislative Assembly (4th term)
- 2019: Re-elected to Maharashtra Legislative Assembly (5th term)
- 2019: Appointed minister of Employment Guarantee and Horticulture MH
- May 2020 - July 2022: Former Guardian Minister of Yavatmal District, Maharashtra
- July 2022: appointed a guardian minister of Aurangabad District, Maharashtra.
- June 2024: elected as the Member of Parliament from Chhatrapati Sambhajinagar (Aurangabad) Lok Sabha constituency (1st term).
