= Preeti Sharma Menon =

National Executive Member

- Born: 15 April 1969 (age 57); Mumbai, Maharastra, India
- Occupation: Politician
- Writing career
- Years active: August 2011 - Present
- Website: Preeti Sharma Menon

Preeti Sharma Menon (born 15 April 1969) is a National Executive Member and spokesperson of Aam Aadmi Party. She joined the India Against Corruption movement in 2011.

== Early life ==
Sharma was born in Mumbai and has spent her entire life in the city. She attended Loreto Convent School, Chembur. She has said she was influenced by the discipline, patriotism, and courage of the Irish Catholic nuns in her school. She participated in public speaking and debates while in school. In the 1980s, she was a technical writer and authored books on computers for school and university use. She acquired a B.A in English Literature from Mumbai University in 1990.

After working as a freelance corporate trainer, she founded Synergy Relationship Management Services in 2001 to offer large-scale training and hiring. Synergy Relationship Management was sold in 2008 and had over 4000 employees across 100 cities in India by that time.

In 2008, she founded Balaji Farms and Country Homes in Raigad, Maharashtra to promote rural tourism. Balaji Farms is set on a five-acre plot in a green belt and introduces farming and animal care to city dwellers.

Soon after, she founded Viira Travels and Logistics Private Limited. Vira Cabs were conceptualized as a cab service driven by women chauffeurs. Today, the cab service has a fleet of 30 cabs and has trained over 200 women to acquire commercial driving licenses.

== Political career ==
In August 2011, she joined the India Against Corruption movement in Mumbai and participated in fund raising, merchandise management, media coordination and organization set-up..

At the time of Aam Aadmi Party's inception, she was appointed the Secretary of Maharashtra state and was responsible for setting up the structures across the state, managing IT, media and social media for the state. She was the lead person in charge of the 2014 Loksabha election for the party in Maharashtra. In June 2014, she resigned as state secretary of the AAP Maharashtra, citing personal reasons, though continued to be a member of the AAP party.

In 2015, she was made the National Co-Convenor for Overseas and Fund Raising and in 2016 was appointed as a National Executive Member in the party. She has actively worked in exposing scams of the powerful politicians and is a petitioner in the Public Interest Litigation that resulted in the arrest of former Deputy Chief Minister Chhagan Bhujbal. She has made allegations of scams of by ministers of the present government including Eknath Khadse, Pankaja Munde, Arjun Khotkar, and Vinod Tawde.

In 2016, the real estate developer Avinash Bhosale filed a defamation suit against Preeti Sharma Menon and three others for Rs. 400 Crore, alleging that they put out a false story about him regarding a land transaction.

In 2017, she alleged that BJP leader Pankaja Munde had given contracts to fake self-help groups on behalf of the government and that the groups have been black-listed by the Supreme Court.

== Personal life ==
Her family originally hails from Haryana and Rajasthan, and her father endured partition, moving from Karachi to Delhi and eventually settling in Mumbai in the 1960s. Her mother's family has been settled in Mumbai since the 1930s.

Aam Aadmi Party political offices
| Preceded by - | National Spokesperson | Incumbent |
| Preceded by - | Member; National Executive Committee; 2016 - Present | Incumbent |
| Preceded by - | AAP Mumbai In charge | Incumbent |
