= Chandrakant Danve =

Indian politician

Chandrakant Pundlikrao Danve is an Indian politician from Jalna district of Maharashtra. He belongs to the Nationalist Congress Party (Sharadchandra Pawar). Danve was elected three times as MLA from Bhokardan Assembly constituency as Nationalist Congress Party candidate (2003, 2004 and 2009).

After the death of the then Bhokardan MLA Vitthalrao Anna Sapkal, Chandrakant Danve was elected for the first time in the 2003 Bhokardan Assembly by-election.

He was the son of Pundlik Hari Danve, former member of parliament (1977 and 1989) from Jalna Lok Sabha constituency.
