= Balasaheb Pawar =

Indian politician (born 1932)

Member of Parliament, Lok Sabha
- In office 1980–1989
- Preceded by: Pundlik Hari Danve
- Succeeded by: Pundlik Hari Danve
- Constituency: Jalna

Personal details
- Born: 15 March 1932
- Party: Indian National Congress
- Spouse: Ratna Prabha Pawar

Balasaheb Pawar (born 15 March 1932) is an Indian politician. He was elected to the Lok Sabha, the lower house of the Parliament of India as a member of the Indian National Congress.
