= Suhas Shirsath =

Indian politician

Member of Maharashtra Legislative Council
- Incumbent
- Assumed office 22 June 2026
- Preceded by: Ambadas Danve
- Constituency: Aurangabad-Jalna Local Authorities

President of Bharatiya Janata Party – Chh. Sambhajinagar rural (Aurangabad)
- In office 19 July 2023 – 18 september 2026
- President: Chandrashekhar Bawankule ravindra Chavan
- Preceded by: vijay autade
- Succeeded by: suresh bankar

Personal details
- Born: 22 July 1972 (age 54)
- Party: Bharatiya Janata Party

Suhas Shirsath (born 22 July 1972) is an Indian politician from Maharashtra and a member of the Maharashtra Legislative Council. He represents the Aurangabad–Jalna Local Authorities constituency and is associated with the Bharatiya Janata Party (BJP).

Shirsath began his public and political career at the grassroots level in Phulambri. He served as the Sarpanch of Phulambri Gram Panchayat for three terms and later became the first president of the Phulambri Nagar Panchayat. He has also held positions in various cooperative and political organisations and has been associated with the BJP's organisational activities in the region.

In 2026, Shirsath was selected by the BJP as its candidate for the Aurangabad–Jalna Local Authorities constituency in the Maharashtra Legislative Council election. He was elected on 22 June 2026 and began his term as a member of the Maharashtra Legislative Council.

He has also served in organisational positions within the BJP, including district-level responsibilities in Chhatrapati Sambhajinagar district. His political career has included work in local self-government, cooperative institutions and party organisation.

== Early life ==
Suhas Trimbakrao Shirsath was born on 22 July 1972 in Phulambri, Maharashtra, India. He completed his Bachelor of Science degree in 1997.

Shirsath began his public life in Phulambri and became involved in local political and social activities. He served as the Sarpanch of Phulambri Gram Panchayat for approximately 15 years before entering municipal politics.

In 2009, Shirsath contested the Maharashtra Legislative Assembly election from the Phulambri constituency as an independent candidate.

== Political career ==
The BJP's nomination of Shirsath was reported as reflecting the party's emphasis on grassroots organisational work and long-term association with its workers. His candidature was seen as a recognition of his organisational role within the party and was expected to strengthen the morale of grassroots BJP workers.

The nomination also increased Shirsath's prominence in the political landscape of the Marathwada region. Political analysts cited in contemporary reports suggested that his selection could strengthen his role within the region's politics and give greater importance to grassroots organisational leadership. "महाराष्ट्र विधान परिषद चुनाव की दौड़ में आगे थे गोरंट्याल, पर भाजपा ने इस नेता पर लगाया दांव". Navbharat Live. 1 June 2026.

=== Positions held ===
==== Local government ====
- Sarpanch of Phulambri Gram Panchayat
- President of Phulambri Nagar Panchayat (2017)

Shirsath was elected as the president of the Phulambri Nagar Panchayat in December 2017, defeating Rajendra Thombre by 190 votes. He received 5,316 votes in the election. In 2019, the Chhatrapati Sambhajinagar district court dismissed an election petition challenging his election as president of the Nagar Panchayat.

==== Within BJP ====
- BJP Taluka President, Phulambri
- BJP District General Secretary, Chhatrapati Sambhajinagar
- BJP District President, Chhatrapati Sambhajinagar

==== Legislative ====
In June 2026, Shirsath was elected to the Maharashtra Legislative Council from the Aurangabad-cum-Jalna Local Authorities constituency as a BJP candidate. He received 455 first-preference votes. Shiv Sena (UBT) candidate Ganesh Kautikrao Lokhande received 135 votes, while Ishak Khan Sandu Khan received 35 votes. A total of 625 votes were cast, of which five were declared invalid.

- Member of the Maharashtra Legislative Council — 2026–present
