= Phulambri =

- Town
- Location in Maharashtra, India
- Coordinates: 20°06′N 75°25′E
- Country: India
- State: Maharashtra
- District: District

Government
  - Mlc: suhas shirsat BJP
  - MP: Kalyan Kale Indian National Congress
  - MLA: Anuradha Chavan BJP

Languages
  - Official: Marathi
- Vehicle registration: MH20
- Nearest city: Chhatrapati Sambhaji Nagar
- Lok Sabha constituency: Jalna
- Vidhan Sabha constituency: Phulambri

Phulambri is a town and headquarter of Phulambri Taluka in Chhatrapati Sambhaji Nagar District in the state of Maharashtra, India. It is situated 57 kilometres from the Ajanta Caves and 25 kilometres from the main district.

== Religion ==
=== Religion in Phulambri Taluka ===
Religion in Phulambri Taluka (2011)
1. Hinduism (82.5%)
2. Islam (12.0%)
3. Buddhism (4.77%)
4. Jainism (0.06%)
5. Sikhism (0.02%)
6. Christianity (0.10%)
7. Others (0.00%)

Hinduism is strong in Phulambri Taluka with 82.52% which is more than Average 69% of Chhatrapati Sambhaji Nagar district. Muslims constitute 12% of the population Thirs ranked religion is Navayana Buddhism which is practiced by 4.77% of the population.
