= Anuradha Chavan =

Indian politician (born 1972)

Member of the Maharashtra Legislative Assembly
- Incumbent
- Assumed office November 2024
- Preceded by: Haribhau Bagade
- Constituency: Phulambri

Personal details
- Party: Bharatiya Janata Party

Anuradha Atul Chavan (born 1972) is an Indian politician from Maharashtra. She was elected to the Maharashtra Legislative Assembly from Phulambri as a member of the Bharatiya Janata Party.

== Early life and education ==
Anuradha is from Phulambari, Chhatrapati Sambhajinagar District, Maharashtra. She married Atul Chavan, an employee of public works department in Pune division. She completed her bachelor of arts in 1995 at Dr. Babasaheb Ambedkar Marathawada University, Aurangabad. She used to run a beauty parlour.

== Career ==
Anuradha won from Phulambri Assembly constituency representing the Bharatiya Janata Party in the 2024 Maharashtra Legislative Assembly election. She polled 135,046 votes and defeated her nearest rival, Autade Vilas Keshavrao of the Indian National Congress, by a margin of 32,501 votes.
