= Narayan Tilakchand Kuche =

Indian politician

Member of the Maharashtra Legislative Assembly
- Incumbent
- Assumed office 2014 - 2019 -2024
- Constituency: Badnapur

Personal details
- Born: 5 March 1987 (age 38) Chhatrapati Sambhajinagar Maharashtra, India
- Political party: Bharatiya Janata Party
- Occupation: Politician

Narayan Tilakchand Kuche is a member of the 13th Maharashtra Legislative Assembly. He represents the Badnapur Assembly Constituency. He belongs to the Bharatiya Janata Party. He is a very popular MLA of Badnapur, mostly in the villages.
