= Raosaheb Danve =

Indian politician (born 1956)

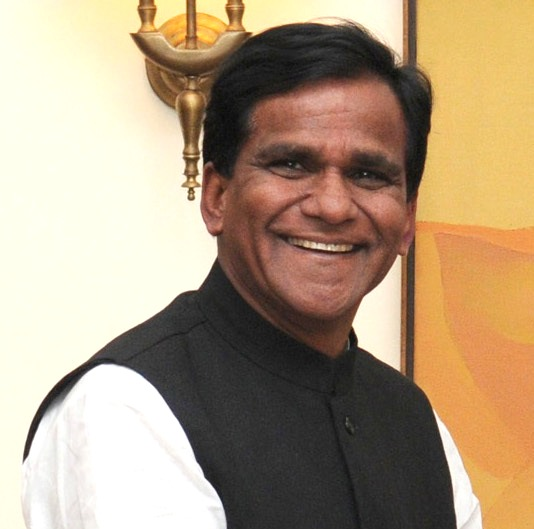

Minister of State for Railways
- In office 7 July 2021 – 11 June 2024 Serving with Darshana Jardosh
- President: Ram Nath Kovind
- Prime Minister: Narendra Modi
- Minister: Ashwini Vaishnaw
- Preceded by: Suresh Angadi

Minister of State for Coal
- In office 7 July 2021 – 11 June 2024
- President: Ram Nath Kovind
- Prime Minister: Narendra Modi
- Minister: Pralhad Joshi

Minister of State for Mines
- In office 7 July 2021 – 11 June 2024
- President: Ram Nath Kovind
- Prime Minister: Narendra Modi
- Minister: Pralhad Joshi

Minister of State for Consumer Affairs, Food and Public Distribution
- In office 30 May 2019 – 7 July 2021
- Prime Minister: Narendra Modi
- Minister: Ram Vilas Paswan
- Preceded by: Chhotu Ram Chaudhary
- Succeeded by: Sadhvi Niranjan Jyoti
- In office 26 May 2014 – 5 March 2015
- Prime Minister: Narendra Modi
- Preceded by: K.V.Thomas

President of Bharatiya Janata Party, Maharashtra
- In office 2014–2019
- Preceded by: Devendra Fadnavis
- Succeeded by: Chandrakant Bacchu Patil

Member of Parliament, Lok Sabha
- In office 1999–2024
- Preceded by: Uttamsingh Pawar
- Succeeded by: Kalyan Kale
- Constituency: Jalna

Member of Maharashtra Legislative Assembly
- In office 1990–1999
- Preceded by: Santoshrao Daspute
- Succeeded by: Chandrakant Danve
- Constituency: Bhokardan

Personal details
- Born: 18 March 1955 (age 71) Jawakheda, Bhokardan, Hyderabad State, India
- Party: Bharatiya Janata Party
- Spouse: Nirmala Danve (m. 1977)
- Children: 4, including Sanjana Jadhav and Santosh Danve
- Parent: Dadarao Danve (father)
- Education: J.E.S. College, Jalna

Raosaheb Dadarao Danve (born 18 March 1955) is an Indian politician and former Member of Parliament from Jalna, Minister of State in the Ministry of Railways, Ministry of Coal and Ministry of Mines in Second Modi ministry. He is a member of Bharatiya Janata Party and was elected to Lok Sabha from Jalna constituency for five straight terms beginning in 1999 until 2024. He previously served as Minister of State for Consumer Affairs, Food and Public Distribution from 30 May 2019 to 7 July 2021 and also served as the Maharashtra state President of BJP.

== Personal life ==
Danve was born to Kesharabai and Dadarao on 18 March 1956. Danve married Nirmala Tai in 1977. They have 3 daughters and a son, Santosh Danve, who is a Bhartiya Janata Party MLA from Bhokardan Legislative Constituency.

== Political career ==
Danve has held leadership positions at all levels of politics in India beginning since 1976. He is known as a leader with rural roots. Danve began his political career as a Sarpanch in 1978, becoming an MLA in 1990 & in 1995 from Bhokardan assembly constituency, and 5 time consecutive Member of parliament since 1999, 2004, 2009, 2014, and 2019.

During the general elections that were held in May 2014, Danve won the Jalna constituency for the fourth time. Immediately afterwards, he was sworn in by the Prime Minister Narendra Modi as the Minister of State for Ministry of Consumer Affairs, Food and Public Distribution, the position he held till March 2015.

Meanwhile, Maharashtra assembly elections were held in October 2014. BJP came to power and Devendra Fadnavis became first BJP Chief Minister of Maharashtra. However, as per the BJP culture, one person only holds one post a time, and hence Devendra Fadnavis resigned as the President of Maharashtra BJP and the search for a new leader commenced. Raosaheb Danve indicated to the party leadership that he was willing to resign as a minister and in January 2015 he was appointed as the President of Maharashtra BJP by Amit Shah, the national President of BJP. Raosaheb Danve is only the second person in Maharashtra BJP to hold this office while also being a Member of Parliament. Earlier, late Suryabhan Vahadane-Patil had successfully carried the dual responsibility.

Danve has attracted controversy due to his freewheeling public comments that may be misconstrued objectionably. For example, in 2016, a FIR was lodged against him for asking voters to accept Laxmi coming to their homes on election eve (alluding to vote buying). When the prices of Tur fell in May 2017, Danve used the term "saale" to chide the "oversensitive farmers". Use of such term was criticised by the opposition parties and Danve expressed his regrets concerning his comment. Later, in 2019, he said that the word saale is a common slang term which is not derogatory in rural marathwada, and he never intended to offend farmers.

In May 2019, Danve became Minister of State for Consumer Affairs, Food and Public Distribution.

In June 2024, Danve lost the election for the 18th Lok Sabha to Kalyan Kale of Indian National Congress.

=== Within BJP ===
- President, BJP Maharashtra (2014)
- President, Bharatiya Janata Party BJP, Dist. Jalna, Maharashtra
- Vice-President, BJP Maharashtra

=== Legislative ===
- 1990-95: Member, Maharashtra Legislative Assembly (First Terms)
- 1995-99: Member, Maharashtra Legislative Assembly (Two Terms)
- 1990-99: Chairman, Panchayati Raj Committee
- 1990-99: Chairman, Assurances Committee
- 1999-2000: Member, Committee on Commerce
- 2000-2004: Member, Consultative Committee, Ministry of Rural Development
- 2000-2004: Member, Committee on Finance
- 2000-2004: Member, Consultative Committee, Ministry of Communications and Information Technology
- 5 Aug. 2007: Member, Committee on Agriculture
- 31 Aug. 2009: Member, Committee on Petroleum and Natural Gas
- 31 Aug. 2009: Member, Committee on Commerce
- 15 July 2015 onwards: Member, Standing Committee on Information Technology
- 27 May 2014 to 5 March 2015: Union Minister of State, Ministry of Consumer Affairs, Food and Public Distribution
- 30 May 2019 to 2024: Union Minister of State, Ministry of Consumer Affairs, Food and Public Distribution

Preceded by Uttamsigh Pawar	Member of Lok Sabha for Jalna; 1999-2024
Preceded by Kalyan Vaijinathrao Kale	Incumbent
