= Jafrabad, Jalna =

Jafrabad
- Tehsil
- Jafarabad
- Location in Maharashtra, India
- Coordinates: 20.19°N 76.01°E
- Country: India
- State: Maharashtra
- District: Jalna
- Founded by: Jafar Khan Jagir from Emperor Aurangzeb
- Named after: Jafar Khan

Government
  - Type: Nagar panchayat
  - Body: Jafrabad Nagar Panchayat

Languages
  - Official: Marathi, Hindi, Urdu
- Time zone: UTC+5:30 (IST)
- PIN: 431206
- Telephone code: 02485
- Vehicle registration: MH-21
- Nearest city: Deulgaon Raja, Bhokardan, Chikhali
- Lok Sabha constituency: Kalyan Kale (2024)
- Vidhan Sabha constituency: Santosh Danve (2019)
- Website: jafrabadmahaulb.maharashtra.gov.in

Jafrabad is a town and a tehsil in Jalna subdivision of Jalna district in the state of Maharashtra, India.

Jafrabad resides over the bank of Purna River. Jafrabad is well known for the fight between Marathas and British at Asseye in 1803, where a small monument carving the name of British Officer Colonel Stevenson, who died during the war, was erected.

== History ==
Jafrabad, the chief town, is situated at the confluence of the Purna and Kailna rivers. It is a large and populous town, surrounded by a fortified stone wall, now in a very dilapidated state; but a small stone gaddi inside is in fair order. The town derived its name from its founder, Jafar Khan, who received it with 115 other villages in jagir from Aurangzeb. It has several good houses of brick and stone, and about 50 bannia shops. The population amounts to 2,150 souls, of whom 859 are Muslims (including a few Patans), 244 Brahmans, and 197 Rajputs. The trade consists of grain, cotton, piece goods, and large quantities of blankets and native cloths for local use. There are 7 masjids and temples in the town, and the principal mosque has a Persian inscription, recording its construction under the orders of Aurangzeb, by Rizazath Khan in 1076 Hijri (A.D. 1664). A large handsome cistern within the fortification, has also an inscription, which states that it was erected under the orders of Shah Jahan by Mustafa Khan Turkoman, in Hijri 1040 (A.D. 1630). The town has bi-weekly markets on Tuesdays and Fridays

== Governance ==
Jafrabad is a nagar panchayat in the Panchayat Raj system of governance. It possesses government offices as Panchayat Samiti, Tehsil, Krishi Department, Block Education Office (BEO), Integrated Child Development Service Scheme (ICDS) office, Live-Stock Development (LDO) Extension Office, MSEB Department, PWD Department, Taluka Health Office, Bhoomi Abhilekh Department for better governance.

It has two rural hospitals, four primary health centres, and related sub-centres.

Jafrabad has a Weather Reporting Office.

== Educations ==
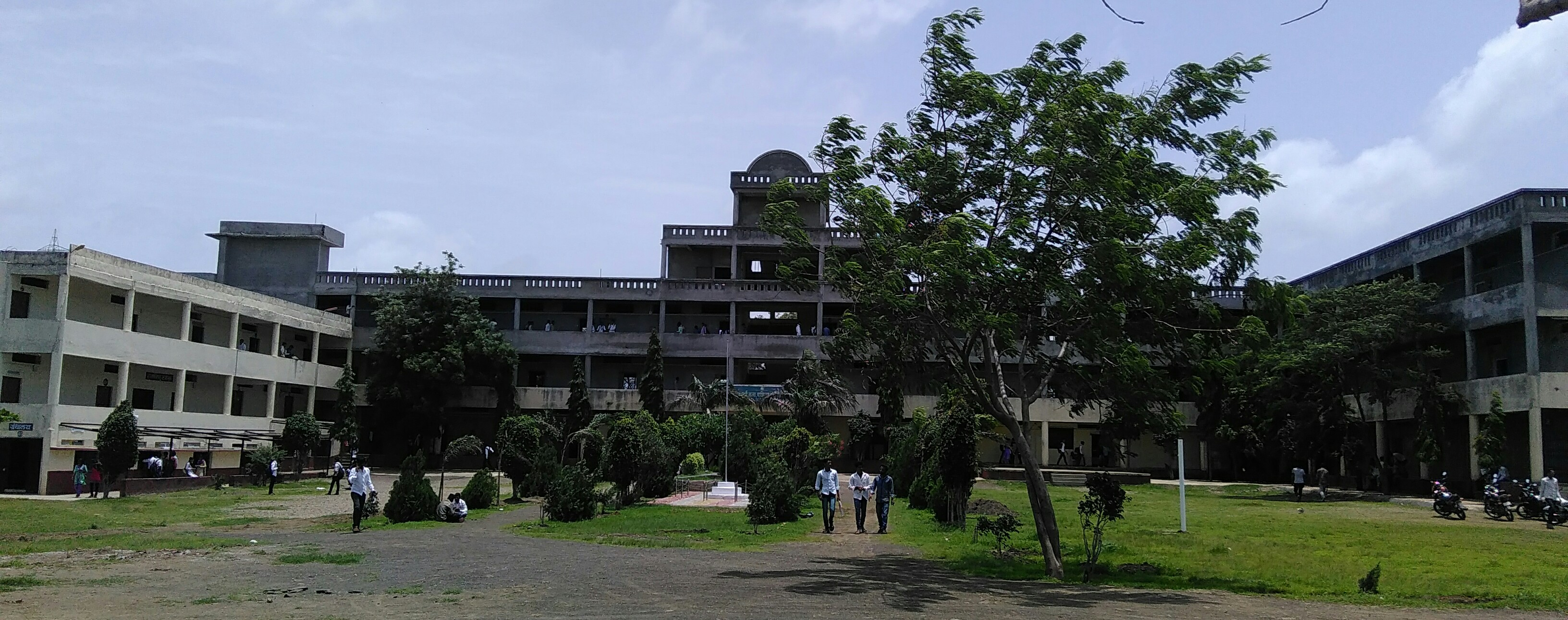
Siddharth College, Jafrabad

There are many schools and colleges in Jafrabad. Siddharth junior and senior college are main among them. Apart from this, there are Samarth College, Dnyansagar College, New High School, Z.P High School are the schools around. 'Gyanjyoti Savitribai Phule Sarvajanik Wachanalaya and Abhyasika' is a public library and study room.
