= Vilas Sandipan Bhumre =

Indian politician

Vilas Sandipanrao Bhumare

Member of Maharashtra Legislative Assembly
- Incumbent
- Assumed office 23 November 2024
- Governor: C. P. Radhakrishnan
- Chief Minister: Devendra Fadnavis
- Preceded by: Sandipanrao Bhumre
- Constituency: Paithan

Personal details
- Born: 4th July, 1986 (Age 40)
- Party: Shiv Sena
- Spouse: Varsha Tai Bhumare
- Children: 2
- Parent: Sandipanrao Bhumre (father)
- Education: Yashwantrao Chavan Open University
- Profession: Agriculture, Rent, Business & Social Work

Vilas Sandipanrao Bhumare, also known as Vilas Bappu Bhumare (born 1986) is an Indian politician and a member of the Shiv Sena. He is currently serving as the Member of the Maharashtra Legislative Assembly from the Paithan Assembly constituency in the Aurangabad district of the state of Maharashtra. He is also currently serving as the Chairman of Shri Renukadevi Sharad Sahakari Sakhar Karkhana Ltd, Vihamandwa & Chhatrapati Sambhajinagar District Central Co-operative Bank.

== Early life and education ==
Vilas Bhumare is from Pachod Village of Paithan Taluka in Chhatrapati Sambhajinagar district, Maharashtra. His father Sandipanrao Bhumre is currently serving as the MP of Chhatrapati Sambhajinagar Lok Sabha constituency and previously was a five time MLA from this constituency for consecutive terms before his son took over. He was former Zilla Parishad finance chairman.

He completed his MA in 2013 at Vivekanad Arts Sardar Dalipsing Commerce and Science College, Chhatrapati Sambhajinagar which is affiliated with Yashwantrao Chavan Open University.
