= Waghrul =

- Village
- Nickname: Waghrul Deviche
- Location in Maharashtra, India
- Coordinates: 19°57′38″N 75°58′46″E
- Country: India
- State: Maharashtra
- District: Jalna

Government
  - Type: Nagar Gram Panchayat
  - Body: Waghrul Gram Panchayat

Area
  - Total: 7.86 km^{2} (3.03 sq mi)

Population (2011)
  - Total: 3,741
  - Density: 476/km^{2} (1,230/sq mi)

Languages
  - Official: Marathi
- Time zone: UTC+5:30 (IST)
- Postal code: 431203
- Telephone code: 02482
- ISO 3166 code: IN-MH
- Vehicle registration: MH-21

Waghrul is a village in Jalna Subdivision of Jalna district, Maharashtra, India. There was a small military base during the time of Shivaji Maharaj. There is a nearly 300-year-old Jagdamba Mata Devi temple with Barav (well) in the village. The Marathwada Mukti Sangram began from Waghrul.

Schools and colleges in Waghrul include Z.P High School, Rangnath Maharaj High School, and Rajkunwar High School and College.

Marathi is the official language of the village, and the most commonly spoken.

Waghrul is connected to major towns of the state by state highways. There are roads to Jalna, Deulgaon Raja, Jafrabad, Deulgaon Mahi, Chikhli, Sambhaji Nagar, Nagpur, and Mumbai having been widened to four-lane highways. The new Mumbai-Nagpur Expressway (Samruddhi Mahamarg) passes through Jalna. The proposed Jalna-Nanded Expressway is also an important corridor that connects the rest of the Marathwada cities like Parbhani and Nanded to the Samruddhi Mahamarg.
