= Anirudh Khotkar =

Indian politician

President of Jalna Zilla Parishad
- Incumbent
- Assumed office 2017

Personal details
- Party: Shiv Sena
- Relations: Arjun Khotkar (Brother)
- Occupation: Politician

Anirudh Khotkar is an Indian politician and Shiv Sena leader from Jalna district of the Marathwada region of Maharashtra. He is elected as President of Zilla Parishad (District Council) of Jalna as a Shiv Sena candidate. He had served as President of Zilla Parishad for 3 terms and Deputy President for 2 terms. Anirudh Khotkar has been elected to as Member of Jalna Zilla Parishad for six consecutive terms which is a record.

== Positions held ==
- 1992: Elected as Member of Jalna Zilla Parishad (1st term)
- 1997: Elected as Member of Jalna Zilla Parishad (2nd term)
- 2002: Elected as Member of Jalna Zilla Parishad (3rd term)
- 2007: Elected as Member of Jalna Zilla Parishad (4th term)
- 2012: Elected as Member of Jalna Zilla Parishad (5th term)
- 2014: Elected as a Deputy President of Jalna Zilla Parishad
- 2017: Elected as Member of Jalna Zilla Parishad (6th term)
- 2017: Elected as a President of Jalna Zilla Parishad
