= Santosh Danve =

Indian politician (born 1986)

Member of the Maharashtra Legislative Assembly for Bhokardan
- Incumbent
- Assumed office 2014
- Preceded by: Chandrakant Danve

Personal details
- Born: 15 December 1986 (age 39) Bhokardan, Maharashtra, India
- Party: Bharatiya Janata Party
- Parent(s): Raosaheb Dadarao Danve (Father); Nirmala Danve (Mother)
- Occupation: Politician

Santosh Raosaheb Danve (born 15 December 1986) is an Indian politician from Jalna district of Maharashtra. He was the youngest member of the 13th Maharashtra Legislative Assembly and belongs to the Bhartiya Janata Party.

== Early life ==
Danve is the son of Raosaheb Danve, Minister of State, independent in-charge of Consumer Affairs, Food and Public Distribution. He graduated from the Moreshwar Arts, Science and Commerce College, Bhokardan.

== Career ==
=== Positions ===
- BJP Member in Maharashtra Legislative Assembly

== Personal life ==
Danve married Renu Sarkate, the daughter of Marathi musician Rajesh Sarkate, in March 2017.
