= Arjun Khotkar =

Indian politician (born 1962)

Member of the Maharashtra Legislative Assembly
- Incumbent
- Assumed office 2024
- Preceded by: Kailas Gorantyal
- Constituency: Jalna

Government of Maharashtra Minister of State for Textile, Animal Husbandry, Dairy Development, and Fisheries
- In office 8 July 2016 – 2019
- In office 2014–2019
- Preceded by: Kailas Gorantyal
- Succeeded by: Kailas Gorantyal
- Constituency: Jalna
- In office 2004–2009
- Preceded by: Kailas Gorantyal
- Succeeded by: Kailas Gorantyal
- Constituency: Jalna
- In office 1990–1999
- Preceded by: Dayma Ramkishan Ramchandra
- Succeeded by: Kailas Gorantyal
- Constituency: Jalna

Personal details
- Born: 1 January 1962 (age 64) Wakhari Wadgaon, Maharashtra, India
- Party: Shiv Sena
- Relations: Vijay Zol (son-in-law); Anirudh Khotkar Sanjay Khotkar (Brothers)
- Website: arjunkhotkar.com

Arjun Panditrao Khotkar (born 1 January 1962) is an Indian politician from Shiv Sena. He was a MLA elected from Jalna in Maharashtra. He has been elected four times to the Maharashtra Legislative Assembly for 1990, 1995, 2004 and 2014. On 25 November 2017, his 2014 election from Jalna Assembly constituency was declared void by Aurangabad Bench of Bombay High Court for filing his nomination papers after deadline has ended.

== Controversies ==
=== Case ===
Justice T V Nalawade of the Aurangabad bench passed the order on an election petition by Kailash Gorantyal of INC who had contested against Khotkar.

=== Accusations ===
The AAP leader Preeti Sharma Menon claimed that Arjun Khotkar, Shiv Sena MLA from Jalna and Chairman of the Agricultural produce market committee (APMC) in Jalna had fraudulently taken over more than 200 shops in Jalna and had distributed amongst his family and friends.

== Positions held ==
#	From	To	Position	Political party
1.	1990	1995	Maharashtra Legislative Assembly (1st term)	Shiv Sena
2.	1995	1999	Maharashtra Legislative Assembly (2nd term)	Shiv Sena
3.	1999	2004	Minister of State, Maharashtra Government	Shiv Sena
4.	2004	2014	Maharashtra Legislative Assembly (3rd term)	Shiv Sena
5.	2014	2015	Maharashtra Legislative Assembly (4th term)	Shiv Sena
6.	2015	2016	Estimate Samiti Pramukh, Maharashtra Vidhan Mandal	Shiv Sena
7.	2016	2017	Minister of State for Textile, Animal Husbandry, Dairy Development, and Fisheries	Shiv Sena
8.	2017	2018	Guardian Minister of Nanded District	Shiv Sena
9.	2018	2019	Guardian Minister of Osmanabad District	Shiv Sena
10.	2024	—	Maharashtra Legislative Assembly (5th term)	Shiv Sena

== See also ==
- First Fadnavis ministry
- Narayan Rane ministry
