= Pundlik Hari Danve =

Indian politician (1926–2021)

Member of Parliament, Lok Sabha
- In office 1989–1991
- Preceded by: Balasaheb Pawar
- Succeeded by: Ankushrao Tope
- Constituency: Jalna
- In office 1977–1980
- Preceded by: Baburao Kale
- Succeeded by: Balasaheb Pawar
- Constituency: Jalna

Personal details
- Born: 9 October 1937 Pipalgaon, Jalna district
- Died: 1 November 2021 (aged 84) Aurangabad, Maharashtra
- Political party: Bharatiya Janata Party, Janata Party
- Spouse: Kesarbai (m. 1946–2021)
- Children: 3 sons, 1 daughter includes Chandrakant,Sudhakar, Babanraw
- Parent: Hari Danve (father)

Pundlik Hari Danve (1926 – 1 November 2021) was a member of the 6th Lok Sabha (1977) and 9th Lok Sabha (1989) of India. He represented the Jalna constituency of Maharashtra and was a member of the Bharatiya Janata Party as well as Janata Party.
