= Kalyan Kale =

Indian politician (born 1963)

Dr. Kalyan Kale

Member of Parliament, Lok Sabha
- Incumbent
- Assumed office 2024
- Preceded by: Raosaheb Danve
- Constituency: Jalna

Member of Maharashtra Legislative Assembly
- In office 2009–2014
- Preceded by: constituency established
- Succeeded by: Haribhau Kisanrao Bagde
- Constituency: Phulambri
- In office 2004–2009
- Preceded by: Haribhau Kisanrao Bagde
- Succeeded by: Rajendra Darda
- Constituency: Aurangabad East

Personal details
- Born: 19 July 1963 (age 62) Pisadevi, Maharashtra
- Party: Indian National Congress
- Spouse: Rekha Kale
- Children: 3
- Education: Bhagwan homeopathic college (BHMS)

Dr. Kalyan Vaijinathrao Kale is an Indian politician who represents the Jalna constituency in Lok Sabha. He is a member of the Indian National Congress party. He previously served as the MLA for the Phulambri Assembly constituency in the 2009 Vidhan Sabha ( Maharashtra legislative assembly, 2009).

== Personal life ==
Kalyan Kale was born to Vaijinathrao Kale on 19 July 1963 in Pisadevi village near Sambaji Nagar/Aurangabad. He is married to Rekha Kale. They have three children and all those are adult

== Position held ==
- 2009-14: Member, Phulambri Assembly Legislative
- 2024 Onwards: Member, Jalna Lok Sabha
- 26-Sep-2024 onwards: Member, Committee on Chemicals and Fertilizers

| Preceded by Raosaheb Danve | Member of Lok Sabha for Jalna; 2024- | Incumbent |
