= Hikmat Udhan =

Indian politician

Hikmat Baliram Udhan (born 1963) is an Indian politician from Maharashtra. He is an MLA from Ghansawangi Assembly constituency in Jalna district. He won the 2024 Maharashtra Legislative Assembly election representing the Shiv Sena.

== Early life and education ==
Udhan is from Ghansawangi, Jalna district, Maharashtra. He is the son of Baliram Tukaram Udhan. He completed his MBBS in 1985 at Government Medical College, Aurangabad, which is affiliated with Marathwada University, Aurangabad. His wife is an entrepreneur.

== Career ==
Udhan won from Ghansawangi Assembly constituency representing the Shiv Sena in the 2024 Maharashtra Legislative Assembly election. He polled 98,496 votes and defeated his nearest rival, Rajesh Tope of the Nationalist Congress Party (SP), by a margin of 2,309 votes. Earlier, he lost twice on Shiv Sena ticket in the 2014 and 2019 Maharashtra Legislative Assembly election.
