= Nashik division =

Nashik Division
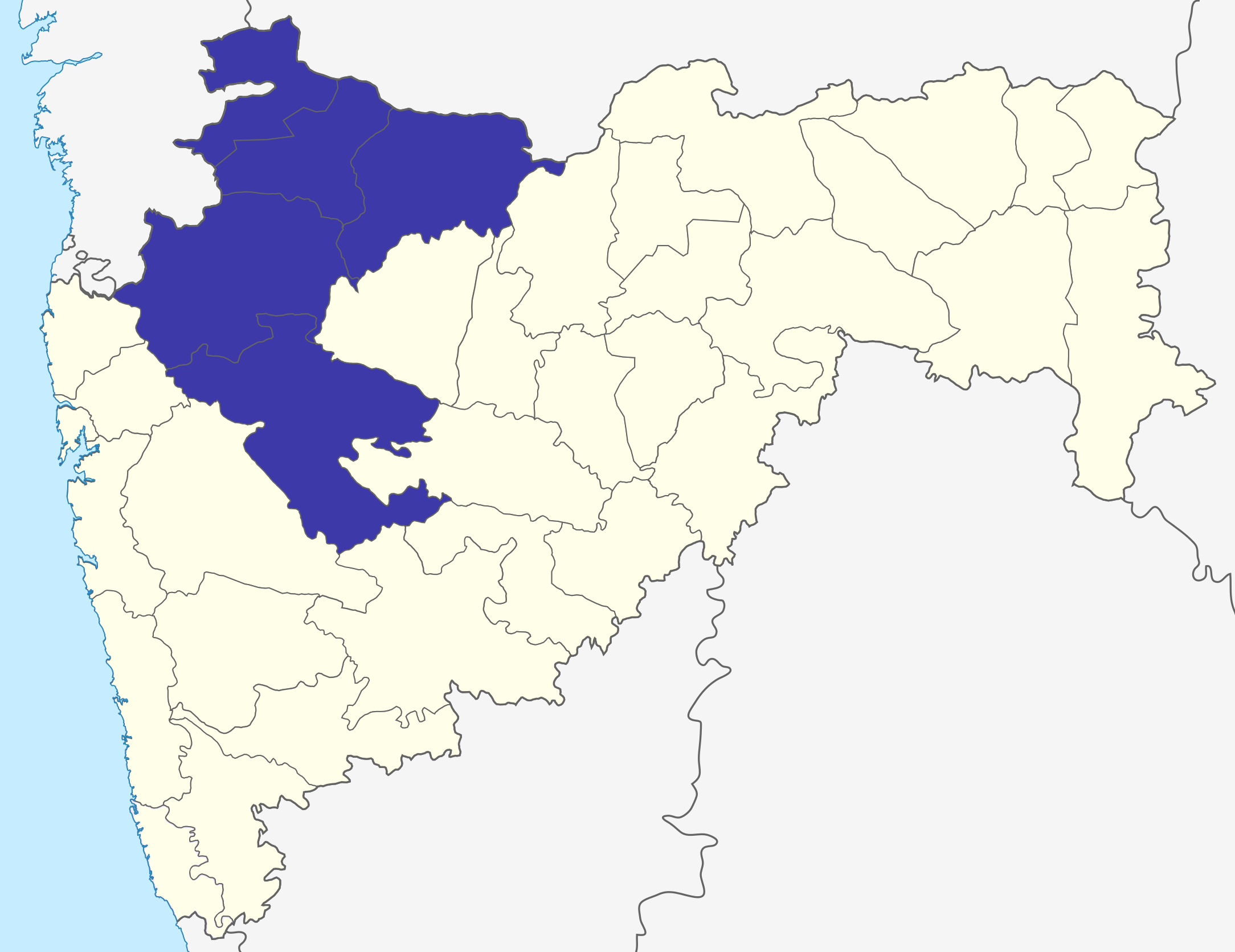
- Location of Nashik Division in Maharashtra
- Coordinates: 20°00′36″N 73°46′48″E
- Country: India
- State: Maharashtra
- Districts: Nashik, Nandurbar, Jalgaon, Dhule, Ahmednagar

Government
  - Commissioner Nashik Division: Rajaram Mane IAS
  - Police Commissioner Nashik Division: NA
  - All Guardian Minister Nashik Division: Chhagan Bhujbal; (Nashik District): Hasan Mushrif; (Ahmednagar District): Adv. Kagda Chandya Padvi; (Nandurbar District): Gulabrao Patil; (Jalgaon District): Balasaheb Thorat Additional charge; (Dhule District)
  - All District Collector's Nashik Division: Gangatharan D. (IAS); (Nashik District): Rajendra Bhosale (IAS); (Ahmednagar District): Manisha Khatri (IAS); (Nandurbar District): Abhijit Rajendra Raut (IAS); (Jalgaon District): Jalaj Sharma (IAS); (Dhule District)
  - All MP's Nashik Division: NA

Area
  - Total: 57,268 km^{2} (22,111 sq mi)

Population (2011)
  - Total: 18,579,420

GDP (Nominal, 2024)
  - Total: ₹4.97 trillion (US$67.03 billion)
  - Per capita: ₹212,528 (US$2,868.14)
- Languages: Marathi

Nashik Division is one of the six divisions of India's Maharashtra state, and four of its five districts form Uttar Maharashtra. The three northernmost districts of Uttar Maharashtra form most of the historic Khandesh region, which covers the northern part of the division in the valley of the Tapti River. Nashik Division is bound by Konkan Division and the state of Gujarat to the west, Madhya Pradesh state to the north, Amravati Division and Marathwada (Aurangabad Division) to the east, and Desh (Pune Division) to the south.

== Demographics ==
As per the 2011 Census of India, Nashik Division had a population of 18,579,420 in the year 2011.

=== Languages ===
Marathi is the most spoken language, which is also the sole official language of the region. Khandeshi and Ahirani languages, along with Bhili are also spoken by a significant portion of the population in Khandesh region of Nashik Division. There are significant minorities of Urdu and Hindi speakers in certain urban areas of the division.

At the time of the 2011 Census of India, 65.14% of the population of Nashik Division spoke Marathi, 8.62% Khandeshi, 6.40% Bhili, 4.90% Urdu and 4.81% Hindi as their first language.

Languages in Nashik Division (2011)
1. Marathi (65.1%)
2. Khandeshi (8.62%)
3. Bhili (6.40%)
4. Urdu (4.90%)
5. Hindi (4.81%)
6. Others (10.1%)

=== Religion ===
At the time of the 2011 Census of India, 86.92% of the population of Nashik Division followed Hinduism, 10.00% Islam, 1.56% Buddhism, 0.35% Christianity and the remaining 1.17% of the population followed other religions or stated no religion.

Religion in Nashik Division (2011)
1. Hinduism (86.9%)
2. Islam (10.0%)
3. Buddhism (1.56%)
4. Christianity (0.35%)
5. Other or not stated (1.17%)

== Districts ==
- Ahmednagar District
- Dhule District
- Jalgaon District
- Nandurbar District
- Nashik District

== Subdivisions ==
There are 54 tehsils of 5 districts are divided into 28 subdivisions in Nashik division.

No.	Subdivision Headquarter	Tehsils	District
1	Ahmednagar	Ahmednagar, Newasa	Ahmednagar
2	Karjat	Karjat, Jamkhed	Ahmednagar
3	Pathardi	Pathardi, Shevgaon	Ahmednagar
4	Shrigonda	Shrigonda, Parner	Ahmednagar
5	Sangamner	Sangamner, Akola	Ahmednagar
6	Shirdi	Rahata, Kopargaon	Ahmednagar
7	Shrirampur	Shrirampur, Rahuri	Ahmednagar
8	Dhule	Dhule, Sakri	Dhule
9	Shirpur	Shirpur, Shindkheda	Dhule
10	Amalner	Amalner, Chopda	Jalgaon
11	Faizpur	Yawal, Raver	Jalgaon
12	Bhusawal	Bhusawal, Muktainagar, Bodwad	Jalgaon
13	Jalgaon	Jalgaon, Jamner	Jalgaon
14	Erandol	Erandol, Dharangaon, Parola	Jalgaon
15	Pachora	Pachora, Bhadgaon	Jalgaon
16	Chalisgaon	Chalisgaon	Jalgaon
17	Nandurbar	Nandurbar, Navapur	Nandurbar
18	Shahada	Shahada, Akrani(Dhadgaon)	Nandurbar
19	Taloda	Taloda, Akkalkuwa	Nandurbar
20	Nashik	Nashik	Nashik
21	Nashik	Igatpuri, Trimbakeshwar	Nashik
22	Dindori	Dindori, Peint	Nashik
23	Niphad	Niphad, Sinnar	Nashik
24	Yeola	Yeola, Nandgaon	Nashik
25	Chandwad	Chandwad, Deola	Nashik
26	Malegaon	Malegaon	Nashik
27	Satana	Satana	Nashik
28	Kalwan	Kalwan, Surgana	Nashik

== Transport ==
=== Air ===
- Nashik Airport is well connected by direct flights to Pune and Ahmedabad.
- Jalgaon Airport is well connected by direct flights to Mumbai,Pune and Ahmedabad.
- Shirdi Airport is an airport in Ahmednagar district.

=== Rail ===
- Nashik Road, Bhusawal, and Jalgaon are major railway stations in the region.

== List of Divisional Commissioners ==
- J. G. Rajadhyaksha 20-02-1981 to 30-09-1984
- J. D. Jadhav 12-12-1984 to 01-12-1985
- Leena Mehendale 28-06-1994 to 28-11-1995
- Kishore Gajbhiye 19-01-2004 to 05-01-2004
- Eknath Dawale 11-02-2014
