= Mandeulgaon =

Village in Maharashtra

Mandeulgaon Man Deulgaon
- Village
- Location in Maharashtra Mandeulgaon (India)
- Country: India
- State: Maharashtra
- District: Jalna

Government
  - Type: Grampanchayat
- Elevation: 523 m (1,716 ft)

Population (2011)
  - Total: 1,872

Languages
  - Official: Marathi
- Time zone: UTC+5:30 (IST)
- Telephone code: 02482
- Vehicle registration: MH-21

Mandeulgaon is a village located in Badnapur taluka of Jalna district, in state of Maharashtra, India.

== Demographics ==
As per 2011 census:

- Mandeulgaon has 359 families residing. The village has population of 1872.
- Out of the population of 1872, 957 are males while 915 are females.
- Literacy rate of the village is 67.75%.
- Average sex ratio of the village is 956 females to 1000 males. Average sex ratio of Maharashtra state is 929.

== Geography, and transport ==
Distance between Mandeulgaon, and district headquarter Jalna is 16 kilometres (9.9 mi).
