= Satona =

Village in Maharashtra

Satona Satona (Kh)
- Village/Railway Station
- Location in Maharashtra, India Satona (India)
- Coordinates: 19.595489°N 76.211062°E
- Country: India
- State: Maharashtra
- District: Jalna

Government
  - Type: Gram panchayat

Population (2011)
  - Total: 7,050
- Demonym: Satonakar

Languages
  - Official: Marathi
- Time zone: UTC+5:30 (IST)
- PIN: 431502
- Telephone code: 02484
- Vehicle registration: MH-21
- Website: maharashtra.gov.in

Satona also known as Satona (Kh) or Satuna, is a major village in Partur taluka of Jalna district in the state of Maharashtra, India. Satona also has a railway station.

== Demography ==
- Satona village has population of 7,050.
- Average Sex Ratio of village is 962 which is higher than Maharashtra state average of 929.
- Village has lower literacy rate compared to Maharashtra. In 2011, literacy rate of village was 71% compared to 82.34% of Maharashtra. Male literacy was 80% while female literacy rate was 61%.
- Schedule Caste (SC) constitutes 8.3% of total population.

== Politics ==
- Though Satona is in Jalna district, it comes under Parbhani Loksabha Constituency for Lok Sabha or General Elections of India. The current Member of Parliament is Sanjay(Bandu) Jadhav of Shiv Sena party.
- Satona comes under Partur-Mantha constituency for Legislative Assembly elections of Maharashtra. The current Member of Legislative Assemble(MLA) from this area is Babanrao Lonikar of Bhartiya Janata Party, who is also cabinet minister in Government of Maharashtra.
