= Pathardeulgaon =

Village in Maharashtra

Pathardeulgaon Pathar Deulgaon
- Village
- Location in Maharashtra Pathardeulgaon (India)
- Country: India
- State: Maharashtra
- District: Jalna

Government
  - Type: Grampanchayat
- Elevation: 523 m (1,716 ft)

Population (2011)
  - Total: 1,220

Languages
  - Official: Marathi
- Time zone: UTC+5:30 (IST)
- Telephone code: 02482
- Vehicle registration: MH-21

Pathardeulgaon, (also spelled as "Pathar Deulgaon") is a village located in Badnapur taluka of Jalna district in the state of Maharashtra, India.

== Demographics ==
As per 2011 census:

- Pathardeulgaon has 258 families residing. The village has population of 1220.
- Out of the population of 1220, 666 are males while 554 are females.
- Literacy rate of the village is 71.08%.
- Average sex ratio of the village is 832 females to 1000 males. Average sex ratio of Maharashtra state is 929.

== Geography ==
Distance between Pathardeulgaon, and district headquarter Jalna is 16 kilometres (9.9 mi).
