= Pune division =

Administrative division of Maharashtra, India

Paschim Maharashtra
- Pune Division
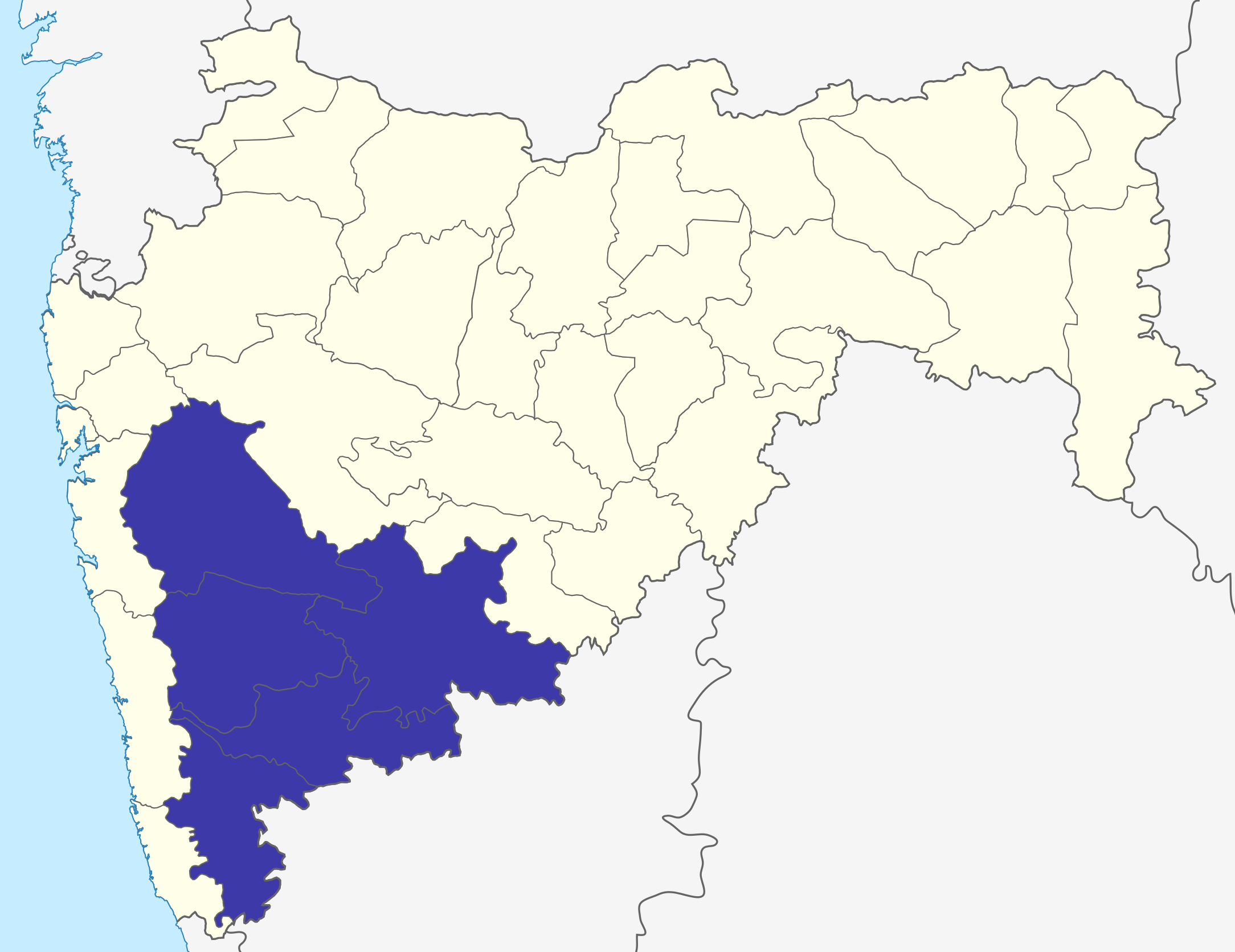
- Location of Pune Division in Maharashtra
- Coordinates: 18°31′48″N 73°50′24″E
- Country: India
- State: Maharashtra
- Districts: 1. Pune, 2. Kolhapur, 3. Sangli, 4. Satara, 5. Solapur

Government
  - Commissioner Pune Division: Dr. Chandrakant L. Pulkundwar (IAS)
  - Police Commissioner, Pune Division: NA
  - All Guardian Minister, Pune Division: Sunetra Pawar; (Pune District): Hasan Mushrif; (Kolhapur District): Jayant Patil; (Sangli District): Shamrao Pandurang Patil; (Satara District): Dattatray Vithoba Bharne; (Solapur District)
  - All District Collectors, Pune Division: Mr. Dr. Rajesh Deshmukh (IAS); (Pune District): Mr. Rahul Rekhawar (IAS); (Kolhapur District): Mr. Dr. Abhijeet Chaudhari (IAS); (Sangli District): Mr. Shekhar Singh (IAS); (Satara District): Mr. Milind Shambharkar (IAS); (Solapur District)
  - All MPs, Pune Division: NA

Area
  - Total: 58,268 km^{2} (22,497 sq mi)
  - Under irrigation: 8,896 km^{2} (3,435 sq mi)

Population (2011 census)
  - Total: 23,449,049

GDP (Nominal, 2024)
  - Total: ₹9.24 trillion (US$124.68 billion)
  - Per capita: ₹307,120 (US$4,144.69)
- Literacy (2001 Census): 76.95%
- Main crops: Jowar, wheat, bajra, sugarcane, rice, soybean, onion, groundnut, vegetables, turmeric, grape, pomegranate

Pune Division (better known as Paschim Maharashtra or Desh) is one of the six administrative divisions of the Indian State of Maharashtra. Pune Division is bound by Konkan Division to the west, Nashik Division to the north, Aurangabad Division to the east, and the state of Karnataka to the south.

It includes some of the most developed and most populous areas of Maharashtra.

== Demographics ==
At the 2011 Census, Pune Division had a population of 23,449,049. The region has a high literacy rate; higher than the national average. According to the 2011 Census, Pune district has a literacy rate of 86.15%, Satara 82.86%, Sangli 81.47%, Kolhapur 81.50% and Solapur 77.01%.

=== Languages ===
The most spoken language is Marathi, which is also the sole official language of the region. There are significant minorities of Hindi speakers as well as speakers of other regional languages such as Telugu, Kannada, Gujarati, Marwari, and Bengali in the urban areas. Kannada is also spoken by a large number of people in the regions bordering Karnataka. Urdu is spoken by the local Muslim population as well as migrants.

At the time of the 2011 Census of India, 81.90% of the population of Pune Division spoke Marathi, 6.88% Hindi, 3.30% Kannada, 2.33% Urdu, 0.97% Telugu, 0.71% Marwari and 0.65% Gujarati as their first language.

Languages in Pune Division (2011)
1. Marathi (81.9%)
2. Hindi (6.88%)
3. Kannada (3.30%)
4. Urdu (2.33%)
5. Telugu (0.97%)
6. Marwadi (0.71%)
7. Gujarati (0.65%)
8. Others (3.26%)

=== Religion ===
At the time of the 2011 Census of India, 86.99% of the population of Pune Division followed Hinduism, 7.62% Islam, 2.49% Buddhism, 0.74% Christianity and the remaining 2.16% of the population followed other religions or stated no religion.

Religion in Pune Division (2011)
1. Hinduism (87.0%)
2. Islam (7.62%)
3. Buddhism (2.49%)
4. Christianity (0.74%)
5. Other or not stated (2.16%)

== History of administrative districts in Pune Division ==
There have been changes in the names of districts and there have also been the addition of newer districts after India gained independence in 1947, and also after the state of Maharashtra was formed.

- Notable events include the creation of Sangli district after merging former royal kingdoms of Miraj, Aundh, Sangli, Tasgaon, and Kurundwad.
- The Second event includes the renaming of the erstwhile Poona district as Pune district.
- The Solapur district is under proposal to be divided and a separate Pandharpur district be carved out of existing Solapur district, comprising talukas of Pandharpur, Sangola, Karmala, Mangalwedha, Malshiras and Madha in Solapur district and also talukas of Jath and Atpadi from neighbouring Sangli district, to create a new Pandharpur district.
- The Pune district is under the proposal to be divided and a separate Baramati district be carved out of existing Pune district with the inclusion of the eastern parts of Pune district which include Shirur, Purandar, Daund, Baramati and Indapur talukas as well as Phaltan taluka from neighboring Satara district in the proposed Baramati district.
- The Satara district is under the proposal to be divided and a separate Karad district be carved out of existing Satara district with the inclusion of Karad and Patan as well as talukas of Walwa, Kadegaon and Shirala from neighboring Sangli district in the proposed Karad district.
