= Ghansawangi Assembly constituency =

Constituency of the Maharashtra legislative assembly in India

Coordinates: 19.52°N 75.99°E

Ghansawangi
- Constituency No. 100 for the Maharashtra Legislative Assembly

Constituency details
- Country: India
- Region: Western India
- State: Maharashtra
- Division: Aurangabad
- District: Jalna
- Lok Sabha constituency: Parbhani
- Established: 2008
- Total electors: 330,425
- Reservation: None

Member of Legislative Assembly
- 15th Maharashtra Legislative Assembly
- Incumbent Hikmat Udhan
- Party: SHS
- Alliance: NDA
- Elected year: 2024

Ghansawangi Assembly constituency is one of 288 assembly constituencies of Maharashtra state of India. It comes under Parbhani Lok Sabha constituency for Indian general elections. It comprises Ghansawangi tehsil and parts of Jalna and Ambad tehsils, all in Jalna district.

The current member of the legislative assembly (MLA) from this constituency is Hikmat Udhan of the Shivsena who defeated Rajesh Tope From NCP-SP.

== Members of the Legislative Assembly ==
Year	Member	Party
1952 - 2008 Known as : Ambad
1952	Bhagwant Rao	Indian National Congress
1957	Nanasaheb Sawalaram Jedhe	Indian National Congress
1962	Nanasaheb Sawalaram Jedhe	Indian National Congress
1967	A. Ambadas	Indian National Congress
1972	Ankushrao Raosaheb Tope	Indian National Congress
1978	Bapusaheb Sakharam Solunke	Janata Party
1980	Bhalchandra Yeshwantrao	Indian National Congress (I)
1985	Vilasrao Vitthalrao Kharat	Indian National Congress
1990	Vilasrao Vitthalrao Kharat	Indian National Congress
1995	Shivaji Kundlikrao Chothe	Shiv Sena
1999	Rajesh Tope	Nationalist Congress Party
2004	Rajesh Tope	Nationalist Congress Party
Till 2009 : Constituency did not exist
2009	Rajesh Tope	Nationalist Congress Party
2014	Rajesh Tope	Nationalist Congress Party
2019	Rajesh Tope	Nationalist Congress Party
2024	Hikmat Udhan	Shiv Sena

== Election results ==
=== Assembly Election 2024 ===
2024 Maharashtra Legislative Assembly election : Ghansawangi
Party	Candidate	Votes	%	±%
SS	Hikmat Udhan	98,496	38.50%	▼7.46
NCP-SP	Rajesh Tope	96,187	37.60%	New
Independent	Satish Jagnnathrao Ghatge	23,696	9.26%	New
VBA	Kaveri Baliram Khatke	20,731	8.10%	▲4.01
SAP	Babasaheb Santukrao Shelke	4,830	1.89%	New
Independent	Shivaji Kundlikrao Chothe	2,324	0.91%	New
Independent	Dinkar Ughade	1,785	0.70%	New
NOTA	None of the Above	486	0.19%	▼0.62
Margin of victory		2,309	0.90%	▼0.60
Turnout		256,289	77.56%	▲4.79
Total valid votes		255,803		
Registered electors		330,425		▲5.61
SS gain from NCP		Swing	▼8.96	

=== Assembly Election 2019 ===
2019 Maharashtra Legislative Assembly election : Ghansawangi
Party	Candidate	Votes	%	±%
NCP	Rajesh Tope	107,849	47.47%	▲1.41
SS	Hikmat Udhan	104,440	45.97%	▲24.52
VBA	Vishnu Shrirang Shelke	9,293	4.09%	New
NOTA	None of the Above	1,842	0.81%	▲0.43
Margin of victory		3,409	1.50%	▼18.93
Turnout		229,771	73.44%	▼2.44
Total valid votes		227,207		
Registered electors		312,859		▲10.33
NCP hold		Swing	▲1.41	

=== Assembly Election 2014 ===
2014 Maharashtra Legislative Assembly election : Ghansawangi
Party	Candidate	Votes	%	±%
NCP	Rajesh Tope	98,030	46.06%	▼8.16
BJP	Vilasrao Vitthalrao Kharat	54,554	25.63%	New
SS	Hikmat Udhan	45,657	21.45%	▼20.64
MNS	Ardad Sunil Kacharubappa	3,583	1.68%	New
INC	Dr. Sanjay Nilkanthrao Lakhe Patil	2,762	1.30%	New
Hindustan Janta Party	Ughade Dinkar Ambadas	1,476	0.69%	New
BSP	Irfan Captian	1,394	0.65%	New
NOTA	None of the Above	813	0.38%	New
Margin of victory		43,476	20.43%	▲8.30
Turnout		213,673	75.35%	▼1.94
Total valid votes		212,849		
Registered electors		283,562		▲13.61
NCP hold		Swing	▼8.16	

=== Assembly Election 2009 ===
2009 Maharashtra Legislative Assembly election : Ghansawangi
Party	Candidate	Votes	%	±%
NCP	Rajesh Tope	104,206	54.22%	New
SS	Arjun Khotkar	80,899	42.09%	New
RPI(A)	Rajendra Kaluba Hiwale	2,165	1.13%	New
Independent	Munwarkha Gulkha Pathan	2,131	1.11%	New
Independent	Shaikh Sayed Mohmod Shaikh Ahmed	1,774	0.92%	New
Margin of victory		23,307	12.13%	
Turnout		192,205	77.01%	
Total valid votes		192,200		
Registered electors		249,598		
NCP win (new seat)				

== See also ==
- 2014 Maharashtra Legislative Assembly election
