= Tirthpuri, Ghansawangi =

Village in Maharashtra, India

Tirthpuri
- Village
- Location within Maharashtra Location within India
- Coordinates: 19°26′20″N 75°55′19″E
- Country: India
- State: Maharashtra
- District: Jalna
- Taluka: Ghansawangi
- Elevation: 439 m (1,440 ft)

Population (2011)
  - Total: 10,148
- Time zone: UTC+5:30 (IST)
- PIN: 431209

Tirthpuri is a village in Ghansawangi Taluka, Jalna district, Maharashtra, India. According to the 2011 Census of India, it is home to 10,148 residents.

== Geography ==
Tirthpuri is situated on the southern bank of a local river, about 45 kilometres south of the district seat Jalna and 12 kilometres southwest of the subdistrict seat Ghansawangi. The village is connected to Ambad-Tirthpuri Road and Kandari-Ambad Road. Its average elevation is at 439 metres above the sea level.

== Climate ==
Tirthpuri has a Tropical Savanna Climate (Aw). It gets the least amount of precipitation in January, with an average of 3 mm of rainfall; and the most precipitation in July, with an average of 226 mm of rainfall.

Climate data for Tirthpuri
Month	Jan	Feb	Mar	Apr	May	Jun	Jul	Aug	Sep	Oct	Nov	Dec	Year
Mean daily maximum °C (°F)	29.3 (84.7)	32.1 (89.8)	35.6 (96.1)	39.5 (103.1)	40.3 (104.5)	34 (93)	29.7 (85.5)	28.7 (83.7)	29.4 (84.9)	30.6 (87.1)	30 (86)	28.9 (84.0)	32.3 (90.2)
Daily mean °C (°F)	22.4 (72.3)	25.1 (77.2)	28.4 (83.1)	32.4 (90.3)	33.5 (92.3)	29 (84)	26.2 (79.2)	25.4 (77.7)	25.5 (77.9)	25.4 (77.7)	23.9 (75.0)	22.2 (72.0)	26.6 (79.9)
Mean daily minimum °C (°F)	15.5 (59.9)	17.9 (64.2)	20.9 (69.6)	24.7 (76.5)	26.6 (79.9)	25 (77)	23.5 (74.3)	22.8 (73.0)	22.2 (72.0)	20.3 (68.5)	17.9 (64.2)	15.6 (60.1)	21.1 (69.9)
Average rainfall mm (inches)	3 (0.1)	3 (0.1)	10 (0.4)	5 (0.2)	14 (0.6)	165 (6.5)	226 (8.9)	200 (7.9)	164 (6.5)	75 (3.0)	17 (0.7)	6 (0.2)	888 (35.1)
Source: Climate-Data.org

== Demographics ==
As of the year 2011, there are a total of 10,148 people living within Tirthpuri. Out of those, 5,200 are male and 4,948 are female. The total literacy rate is at 56.85%, with 3,322 of the male population and 2,447 of the female population being literate. The census location code is 547983.
