= Rajesh Tope =

Indian politician

Rajesh Bhaiyya Tope

Cabinet Minister Government of Maharashtra
- In office 30 December 2019 – 29 June 2022
- Minister: Public Health and Family Welfare; Skill Development and Entrepreneurship Additional charge On 27th March 2022
- Governor: Bhagat Singh Koshyari
- Chief Minister: Uddhav Thackeray
- Deputy CM: Ajit Pawar
- Preceded by: Girish Mahajan

Government of Maharashtra Cabinet Minister of Higher and Technical Education
- In office 08 Dec 2008 – 28 September 2014
- Preceded by: Suresh Jain
- Succeeded by: Vinod Tawde

Government of Maharashtra Ministry of Medical Education
- In office 08 Dec 2008 – 06 Nov 2009
- Preceded by: Dilip Walse Patil
- Succeeded by: Vijaykumar Krishnarao Gavit

Member of Maharashtra Legislative Assembly
- In office 1999–2024
- Preceded by: Shivaji Kundlik Chothe
- Succeeded by: Hikmat Udhan
- Constituency: Ambad; Ghansawangi

Personal details
- Born: January 11, 1969 (age 57) Aurangabad, Maharashtra, India
- Citizenship: India
- Party: Nationalist Congress Party (Sharadchandra Pawar)
- Other political affiliations: Indian National Congress (until 1999)
- Spouse: Manisha Tope
- Children: 1 son, 1 Daughter
- Parent: Ankushrao Tope (father)
- Education: Bachelor of Engineering (mechanical)
- Occupation: Politician
- Website: www.rajeshtope.com

Rajesh Ankushrao Tope alias Rajesh Bhaiyya is an Indian politician and member of the Nationalist Congress Party (Sharadchandra Pawar).He was Member of Legislative assembly till November 2024. Rajesh Tope won the Ghansawangi (Vidhan Sabha constituency) in 2019 Maharashtra Legislative Assembly election. He won the 2009 Assembly Election from the same constituency.2019 to 2024 was his third term as a member from Ghansawangi constituency, while before that he was 2 Time MLA from Ambad constituency, Maharashtra Legislative Assembly MLA. He served as the Health Minister of Maharashtra in the Uddhav Thackeray ministry. He also worked as a guardian minister of Jalna in his political career.

== Constituency ==
Rajesh Tope had represented the Ghansawangi (Vidhan Sabha constituency) in Maharashtra Legislative Assembly.

== Political party ==
Rajesh Tope is from the Nationalist Congress Party.

== Positions held ==
- Maharashtra Legislative Assembly MLA
- Terms in office: 2009-2014 & 2014-2019 & 2019-2024
