= List of districts of Maharashtra =

Maharashtra is an Indian state that was formed on 1 May 1960 with 26 initial districts. Since then, 10 additional districts have been created, the most recent of which is Palghar district. The state currently has 36 districts. These districts are grouped into six administrative divisions shown below.

Maharashtra with all of its districts

== All divisions in Maharashtra ==
Maharashtra is divided into 36 districts, which are grouped into six divisions.

=== Regions ===
Geographically, historically, politically, and according to cultural sentiments, Maharashtra has five main regions:

- Konkan (Konkan division)
- Western Maharashtra (Desh), also known as Desh (Pune division)
- North Maharashtra (Nashik division) - contains Khandesh (Note: Nashik and Ahmednagar districts do not culturally belong to Khandesh region. Culturally, Nashik and Ahmednagar districts share a pattern called Gangathadi. North Maharashtra is the geographical region representing all four districts except Ahmednagar.)
- Marathwada (Aurangabad division)
- Vidarbha (Nagpur and Amravati divisions) - formerly Central Provinces and Berar (Note: Amravati division used to be a separate region of Central Provinces and Berar as Berar division, known as "Varhad" in Marathi, before becoming part of Vidarbha division of Maharashtra.)

=== Divisions ===
Name of division (headquarters)	Region	Districts	Largest city	Population (2011)	Area
Pune division (HQ: Pune)	Desh	Sangli; Satara; Solapur; Kolhapur; Pune	Pune	23,449,049	58,268
Amravati division (HQ: Amravati)	Vidarbha (Varhad)	Akola; Amravati; Buldhana; Yavatmal; Washim	Amravati	11,258,117	46,090
Aurangabad division (HQ: Aurangabad)	Marathwada	Aurangabad; Beed; Jalna; Osmanabad; Nanded; Latur; Parbhani; Hingoli	Aurangabad	18,731,872	64,590.58
Nagpur division (HQ: Nagpur)	Vidarbha	Bhandara; Chandrapur; Gadchiroli; Gondia; Nagpur; Wardha	Nagpur	11,754,434	51,336
Nashik division (HQ: Nashik)	North Maharashtra (Khandesh)	Ahmednagar; Dhule; Jalgaon; Nandurbar; Nashik	Nashik	18,579,420	57,268
Konkan division (HQ: Mumbai)	Konkan	Mumbai City district; Mumbai Suburban district; Thane; Palghar; Raigad; Ratnagiri; Sindhudurg	Mumbai	28,601,441	30,728

== Districts ==
The table below lists important geographic and demographic parameters for all 36 districts. Population data are extracted from the 2011 Census of India.

No	Name	Code	Formed	Headquarters	Administrative division	Area (km^{2})	Population (2011 Census)	% of state Population	Density (per km^{2})	Urban (%)	Literacy (%)	Sex ratio	Tehsils	Source
1	Ahmednagar	AH	1 May 1960	Ahmednagar	Nashik	17,048	4,543,159	4.04%	234.77	19.67	79.05	941	14	district website
2	Akola	AK	1 May 1960	Akola	Amravati	5,428	1,813,906	1.61%	300.78	53.23	88.05	938	7	district website
3	Amravati	AM	1 May 1960	Amravati	Amravati	12,235	2,888,445	2.57%	206.40	34.50	87.38	838	14	district website
4	Aurangabad	AU	1 May 1960	Aurangabad	Aurangabad	10,100	3,701,282	3.29%	286.83	37.53	79.08	924	9	district website
5	Beed	BI	1 May 1960	Beed	Aurangabad	10,693	2,585,049	1.07%	207.04	17.91	76.99	936	11	district website
6	Bhandara	BH	1 May 1960	Bhandara	Nagpur	3,717	1,200,334	1.07%	305.58	15.44	83.76	982	7	district website
7	Buldhana	BU	1 May 1960	Buldhana	Amravati	9,661	2,586,258	2.30%	230.63	21.2	83.40	946	13	district website
8	Chandrapur	CH	1 May 1960	Chandrapur	Nagpur	11,443	2,204,307	1.96%	193.65	32.11	80.01	948	15	district website
9	Dhule	DH	1 May 1960	Dhule	Nashik	7,195	2,050,862	1.83%	211.83	26.11	72.80	944	4	district website
10	Gadchiroli	GA	26 August 1982	Gadchiroli	Nagpur	14,412	1,072,942	0.95%	67.33	6.93	74.36	976	12	district website
11	Gondia	GO	1 May 1999	Gondia	Nagpur	5,234	1,322,507	1.18%	247.81	11.95	84.95	1005	8	district website
12	Hingoli	HI	1 May 1999	Hingoli	Aurangabad	4,526	1,177,345	1.05%	218.11	15.2	78.17	953	5	district website
13	Jalgaon	JG	1 May 1960	Jalgaon	Nashik	11,765	4,229,917	3.76%	312.79	71.4	78.20	932	15	district website
14	Jalna	JN	1 May 1981	Jalna	Aurangabad	7,687	1,959,046	1.74%	211.82	19.09	71.52	952	8	district website
15	Kolhapur	KO	1 May 1960	Kolhapur	Pune	7,685	3,876,001	3.45%	457.44	29.65	81.51	949	12	district website
16	Latur	LA	16 August 1982	Latur	Aurangabad	7,157	2,454,196	2.18%	282.19	23.57	77.26	935	10	district website
17	Mumbai City	MC	1 May 1960	Mumbai	Konkan	157	3,085,411	2.75%	49,140.9	100	89.21	777	0	district website
18	Mumbai Suburban	MU	1 October 1990	Bandra	Konkan	446	9,356,962	8.33%	23,271	100	89.91	822	3	district website
19	Nagpur	NG	1 May 1960	Nagpur	Nagpur	9,892	4,653,570	4.14%	409.36	64.33	88.39	933	14	district website
20	Nanded	ND	1 May 1960	Nanded	Aurangabad	10,528	3,361,292	2.99%	275.98	28.29	75.45	942	16	district website
21	Nandurbar	NB	1 July 1998	Nandurbar	Nashik	5,955	1,648,295	1.47%	260	15.5	64.38	975	6	district website
22	Nashik	NS	1 May 1960	Nashik	Nashik	15,582	6,107,187	5.43%	321.56	38.8	82.31	927	15	district website
23	Osmanabad	OS	1 May 1960	Osmanabad	Aurangabad	7,569	1,657,576	1.48%	197.89	17.0	78.44	924	8	district website
24	Palghar	PL	1 August 2014	Palghar	Konkan	5,344	2,990,116	2.66%	562	50	N.A.	900	8	district website
25	Parbhani	PA	1 May 1960	Parbhani	Aurangabad	6,251	1,836,086	1.63%	244.4	31.8	73.34	958	9	district website
26	Pune	PU	1 May 1960	Pune	Pune	15,643	9,429,408	8.39%	461.85	58.1	86.15	919	14	district website
27	Raigad	RG	1 May 1960	Alibag	Konkan	7,152	2,634,200	2.34%	308.89	24.2	83.14	976	15	district website
28	Ratnagiri	RT	1 May 1960	Ratnagiri	Konkan	8,208	1,615,069	1.44%	206.72	11.3	82.18	1,136	9	district website
29	Sangli	SN	1 May 1960	Sangli	Pune	8,578	2,822,143	2.51%	301.18	24.5	81.48	957	10	district website
30	Satara	ST	1 May 1960	Satara	Pune	10,480	3,003,741	2.67%	266.77	14.2	82.87	995	11	district website
31	Sindhudurg	SI	1 May 1981	Oros	Konkan	5,207	849,651	0.76%	166.86	9.5	85.56	1,079	8	district website
32	Solapur	SO	1 May 1960	Solapur	Pune	14,895	4,317,756	3.84%	259.32	31.8	77.02	935	11	district website
33	Thane	TH	1 May 1960	Thane	Konkan	4,214	8,070,032	7.18%	850.71	72.58	84.53	858	7	district website
34	Wardha	WR	1 May 1960	Wardha	Nagpur	6,310	1,300,774	1.16%	195.03	25.17	86.99	936	8	district website
35	Washim	WS	1 July 1998	Washim	Amravati	5,150	1,197,160	1.07%	275.98	17.49	83.25	939	6	district website
36	Yavatmal	YTL	1 May 1960	Yavatmal	Amravati	13,582	2,772,348	2.47%	152.93	18.6	82.82	951	16	district website
-	Maharashtra	-	-	-	-	307,129	112,374,333	100%	314.42	42.43	77.27	922	-	-

== Proposals for new districts ==
Demands for the administrative bifurcation and reorganization of existing districts in Maharashtra are driven by the challenges of governing extensive geographical territories and managing high-density urban populations. In 2015, public representatives and former ministers formally petitioned for the creation of several districts to support rural and tribal blocks, including Katol, Chimur, Pusad, Khamgaon, Achalpur, and Aheri.

Subsequently, in 2018, the state government under then Chief Minister Devendra Fadnavis constituted a high-level committee led by the Chief Secretary to systematically evaluate these needs. The committee submitted a structural proposal to create 22 new districts across the state to streamline public utility delivery and optimize regional governance.

List of Proposed Districts in Maharashtra Grouped by Current District
Proposed District	Expected Area of Jurisdiction	Rationale / Status
Proposed from Ahmednagar
Sangamner	Northwestern blocks of Ahmednagar district.	Included in the 2018 restructuring committee report to optimize administrative focus in the northwestern upper valley area.
Shirdi	Northern transit and pilgrim tracts of the district.	Proposed to establish dedicated administrative machinery for handling heavy religious tourism and commercial infrastructure.
Shrirampur	Central-northern agricultural and manufacturing blocks.	Part of a long-standing proposal to split the expansive territory of Ahmednagar district into more manageable units.
Proposed from Amravati
Achalpur	Northern sub-divisions bordering Madhya Pradesh.	Demanded by regional leaders in 2015 to bring public service access closer to populations in the northern sub-mountainous blocks.
Proposed from Beed
Ambajogai	Southeastern blocks of Beed district.	Recommended by the 2018 government committee to decentralize administrative delivery away from Beed city.
Proposed from Bhandara
Sakoli	Eastern and southern blocks of Bhandara.	Proposed to optimize local governance and focus on the distinct forestry and agrarian challenges of the eastern sectors.
Proposed from Buldhana
Khamgaon	Eastern commercial and industrial blocks of Buldhana.	Initially requested in 2015 to decouple the high-density market centers of the east from Buldhana town's administration.
Proposed from Chandrapur
Chimur	Northern mineral-rich and forest blocks of Chandrapur.	First formally proposed in 2015 to bridge the geographical and developmental gap for northern communities.
Proposed from Gadchiroli
Aheri	Expansive southern tribal and forest belt of Gadchiroli.	Highly localized demand aimed at establishing basic state utility presence in the extreme remote and left-wing extremism-affected southern blocks.
Proposed from Jalgaon
Bhusawal	Central-eastern urban and major railway junction zone.	Proposed to create a compact urban district centered around Bhusawal to manage high demographic density.
Proposed from Latur
Udgir	Eastern blocks bordering Karnataka and Telangana.	Evaluated by the 2018 panel to streamline border-area administration and reduce transit times for peripheral residents.
Proposed from Nagpur
Katol	Western citrus-growing agricultural belt of Nagpur.	Demanded in 2015 to better serve the logistical and economic requirements of the agrarian rural blocks.
Parseoni	Northern industrial and mining blocks.	Included in the 2018 executive framework to accommodate rapid regional expansion north of Nagpur city.
Proposed from Nanded
Kinwat	Remote northern forest blocks bordering Telangana.	Proposed to improve infrastructure coordination and administrative oversight in isolated tribal tracts.
Proposed from Nashik
Kalwan	Northern tribal and agricultural blocks of Nashik.	Included in the 2018 committee recommendations to streamline development planning for northern hill communities.
Malegaon	High-density textile industrial center and northeastern blocks.	A long-standing regional proposal aimed at separating the major urban industrial ecosystem of Malegaon from Nashik's primary core.
Proposed from Palghar
Jawhar	Inland tribal and mountainous sub-divisions of eastern Palghar.	Proposed to create a dedicated administrative unit for the interior blocks, which were left distant following Palghar's bifurcation from Thane.
Proposed from Pune
Shivneri	Northern blocks of Pune district, centered around Junnar.	Recommended by the 2018 panel to optimize historical tourism management and agrarian development in the north.
Baramati	Southeastern high-growth industrial and agricultural blocks.	Proposed to decouple the dense corporate, sugar-industrial, and educational hubs of the southeast from Pune city's executive infrastructure.
Proposed from Raigad
Mahad	Southern Konkan coastal and hilly tracts of Raigad.	Evaluated in the 2018 state plan to improve public access and mitigate heavy monsoon transport disruptions in the south.
Proposed from Ratnagiri
Mandangad	Extreme northern blocks of Ratnagiri district.	Proposed to address geographical isolation caused by the rugged Konkan terrain, bringing district offices closer to remote residents.
Proposed from Satara
Mandesh	Eastern drought-prone arid blocks of Satara and adjacent boundaries.	Formulated to create a dedicated administrative focus toward managing irrigation, water security, and rural livelihood challenges.
Proposed from Thane
Mira-Bhayandar	High-density municipal corporation area bordering Mumbai.	Part of the 2018 government plan to separate rapidly expanding satellite city infrastructure from suburban Thane's jurisdiction.
Navi Mumbai	Planned metropolitan nodes along the harbor.	Demanded to consolidate the complex metropolitan urban infrastructure under a singular, localized district administration.
Kalyan	Urban-industrial municipal conglomerate of Kalyan-Dombivli and peripheral blocks.	Proposed to streamline heavy civic and industrial governance separate from Thane's central administrative loop.
Proposed from Yavatmal
Pusad	Western blocks of Yavatmal district.	A long-standing regional demand re-evaluated in 2015 to optimize public services in the western agricultural belts.

== See also ==
- Tehsils in Maharashtra
