= Jamthi Khurd =

Village in Maharashtra

Coordinates: 20°43′N 77°34′E

Jamthi Khurd is a village in Hingoli District in the Indian state of Maharashtra.

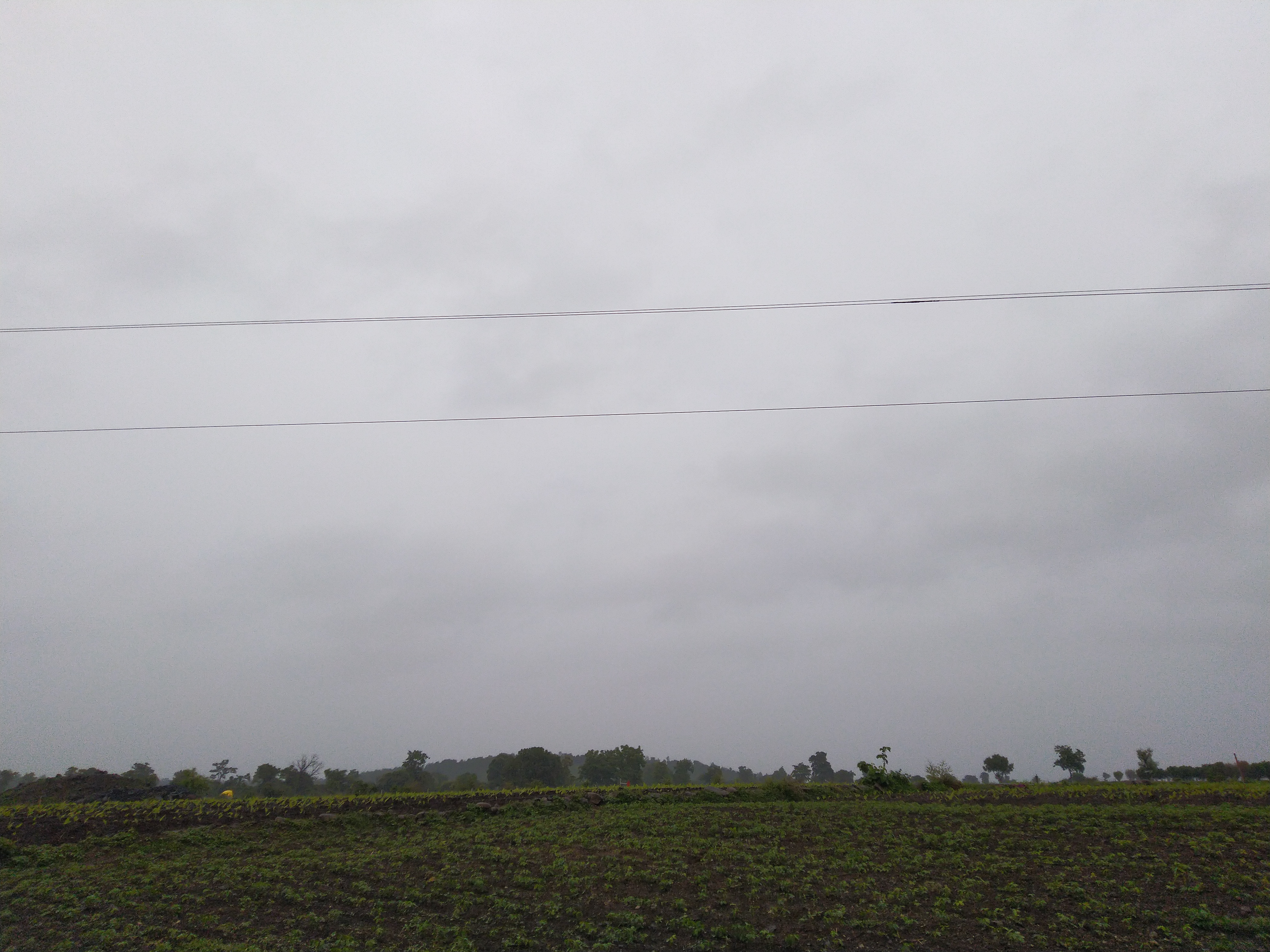
Dense clouds over Jamthi Khurd

It comes under Hingoli Taluka of Hingoli District & Aurangabad Division in Maharashtra.

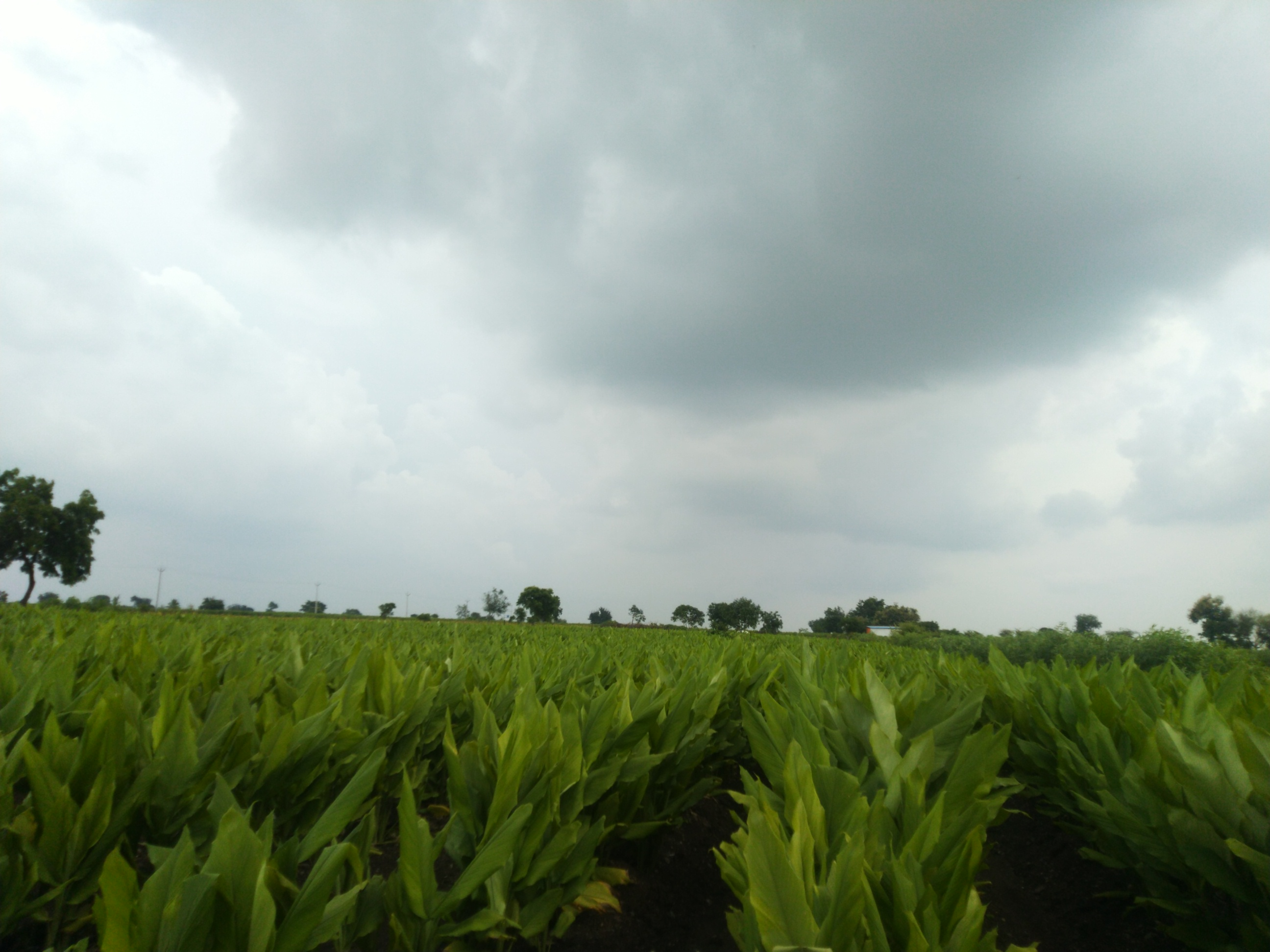
Turmeric farm near Jamthi Khurd village

Its coordinates are at R493+WV Jamthi Kh., Maharashtra which is Plus Code and 19.819N 77.104E. According to the 2011 population of India, it has 1451 people.
