= Ghanewadi Dam =

- Location within Maharashtra
- Official name: Ghanewadi Dam D03845
- Location: Jalna
- Coordinates: 19.9087736°N 75.853796°E
- Opening date: 1935
- Owners: Government of Maharashtra, India

Dam and spillways
- Type of dam: Earthfill
- Impounds: Kundlika river
- Height: 15 m (49 ft)
- Length: 836 m (2,743 ft)

Ghanewadi Dam, is an earthfill dam on Kundlika river near Jalocala, Jalna district in the state of Maharashtra in India. This dam was built under the sultan of Hyderabad Deccan Mir Osman Ali Khan - (the 7th nizam of Hyderabad) whose cinstrution was completed in the year 1935 and was the primary source of water for the city of "Jalna".

== Specifications ==
The height of the dam above lowest foundation is 15 m (49 ft) while the length is 836 m (2,743 ft). The gross storage capacity is 14,440.00 km^{3} (3,464.34 cu mi).

== Purpose ==
- Water Supply

== See also ==
- Dams in Maharashtra
- List of reservoirs and dams in India
