= Ambad Assembly constituency =

Constituency of the Maharashtra legislative assembly in India

Ambad
- Former constituency for the Maharashtra Legislative Assembly

Constituency details
- Country: India
- Region: Western India
- State: Maharashtra
- Established: 1952
- Abolished: 2008
- Total electors: 2,11,881

Ambad Assembly constituency was an assembly constituency in the India state of Maharashtra.

== Members of the Legislative Assembly ==
| Election | Member | Party |
|---|---|---|
| 1952 | Bhagwant Rao | Indian National Congress |
| 1957 | Nanasaheb Sawalaram Jedhe | Indian National Congress |
| 1962 | Nanasaheb Sawalaram Jedhe | Indian National Congress |
| 1967 | Annasaheb Ambadas Udhan | Indian National Congress |
| 1972 | Ankushrao Raosaheb Tope | Indian National Congress |
| 1978 | Bapusaheb Sakharam Solunke | Janata Party |
| 1980 | Bhalchandra Yeshwantrao | Indian National Congress (I) |
| 1985 | Vilasrao Vitthalrao Kharat | Indian National Congress |
| 1990 | Vilasrao Vitthalrao Kharat | Indian National Congress |
| 1995 | Shivaji Kundlikrao Chothe | Shiv Sena |
| 1999 | Rajesh Tope | Nationalist Congress Party |
| 2004 | Rajesh Tope | Nationalist Congress Party |
After 2009 see: Ghansawangi

== Election results ==
=== Assembly Election 2004 ===
2004 Maharashtra Legislative Assembly election : Ambad
| Party | Candidate | Votes | % | ±% |
|---|---|---|---|---|
| NCP | Rajeshbhaiyya Tope | 76,816 | 46.46% | ▲2.85 |
| Independent | Vilasbapu Vithalrao Kharat | 40,127 | 24.27% | New |
| SS | Chothe Shivaji Kundlikrao | 35,348 | 21.38% | ▼12.80 |
| Independent | Zende Sukhadev Sitaram | 4,105 | 2.48% | New |
| Independent | Salve Kacharu Madhavrao | 2,861 | 1.73% | New |
| BSP | Chunnilal Mohan Jadhav | 2,614 | 1.58% | New |
| Prabuddha Republican Party | Ughade Dinkar Ambadasrao | 1,548 | 0.94% | New |
| Margin of victory | | 36,689 | 22.19% | ▲12.76 |
| Turnout | | 165,932 | 78.31% | ▲6.00 |
| Total valid votes | | 165,326 | | |
| Registered electors | | 211,881 | | ▲17.71 |
| NCP hold | | Swing | ▲2.85 | |

=== Assembly Election 1999 ===
1999 Maharashtra Legislative Assembly election : Ambad
| Party | Candidate | Votes | % | ±% |
|---|---|---|---|---|
| NCP | Rajesh Ankushrao Tope | 52,017 | 43.61% | New |
| SS | Chothe Shivaji Kundlikrao | 40,765 | 34.18% | ▼6.48 |
| INC | Dongre Bhimrao Nivratti | 25,253 | 21.17% | ▼15.65 |
| Margin of victory | | 11,252 | 9.43% | ▲5.59 |
| Turnout | | 130,163 | 72.31% | ▲0.14 |
| Total valid votes | | 119,270 | | |
| Registered electors | | 180,010 | | ▲2.19 |
| NCP gain from SS | | Swing | ▲2.95 | |

=== Assembly Election 1995 ===
1995 Maharashtra Legislative Assembly election : Ambad
| Party | Candidate | Votes | % | ±% |
|---|---|---|---|---|
| SS | Chothe Shivaji Kundlikrao | 49,628 | 40.66% | ▲16.06 |
| INC | Kharat Vilasrao Vitthalrao | 44,940 | 36.82% | ▼16.67 |
| Independent | Thakur Pralhadsingh Dhansingh | 9,251 | 7.58% | New |
| BBM | Prof. Tukaram Santram Gayke | 5,738 | 4.70% | New |
| JD | Solunke Bapusaheb Sakharam | 4,339 | 3.56% | ▼14.96 |
| Independent | Magre Bhaskar Bansidhar | 3,516 | 2.88% | New |
| Independent | Jadhav Madanrao Limbaji | 1,367 | 1.12% | New |
| Independent | Hatote Bansidhar Chandrabhan | 963 | 0.79% | New |
| Margin of victory | | 4,688 | 3.84% | ▼25.05 |
| Turnout | | 127,136 | 72.17% | ▲6.30 |
| Total valid votes | | 122,052 | | |
| Registered electors | | 176,154 | | ▲7.37 |
| SS gain from INC | | Swing | ▼12.83 | |

=== Assembly Election 1990 ===
1990 Maharashtra Legislative Assembly election : Ambad
| Party | Candidate | Votes | % | ±% |
|---|---|---|---|---|
| INC | Kharat Vilasrao Vitthalrao | 55,957 | 53.49% | ▲5.15 |
| SS | Paulbudhe Bhausaheb Bapurao | 25,735 | 24.60% | New |
| JD | Ankush Bhalekar | 19,373 | 18.52% | New |
| Independent | Babasaheb Uttamrao Patil Shinde | 1,660 | 1.59% | New |
| Independent | Jadhav Nathaji Govindrao | 637 | 0.61% | New |
| Margin of victory | | 30,222 | 28.89% | ▲14.09 |
| Turnout | | 108,069 | 65.87% | ▲14.46 |
| Total valid votes | | 104,603 | | |
| Registered electors | | 164,058 | | ▲24.41 |
| INC hold | | Swing | ▲5.15 | |

=== Assembly Election 1985 ===
1985 Maharashtra Legislative Assembly election : Ambad
| Party | Candidate | Votes | % | ±% |
|---|---|---|---|---|
| INC | Vilas Vithalrao Kharat | 31,495 | 48.34% | New |
| JP | Ankush Bhalekar | 21,850 | 33.53% | New |
| Independent | Nilwarn Bhalchandra Kulkarni | 7,108 | 10.91% | New |
| CPI | Raut Gangaram Govindrao | 2,021 | 3.10% | New |
| Independent | Bhaurao Malhari Salve | 1,311 | 2.01% | New |
| Independent | Hidayat Khan Sultankhan | 974 | 1.49% | New |
| Independent | Syed Khaleel Syed Papamiya | 398 | 0.61% | New |
| Margin of victory | | 9,645 | 14.80% | ▼2.06 |
| Turnout | | 67,794 | 51.41% | ▼4.76 |
| Total valid votes | | 65,157 | | |
| Registered electors | | 131,872 | | ▲12.22 |
| INC gain from INC(I) | | Swing | ▼5.20 | |

=== Assembly Election 1980 ===
1980 Maharashtra Legislative Assembly election : Ambad
| Party | Candidate | Votes | % | ±% |
|---|---|---|---|---|
| INC(I) | Bhalchandra Yeshwantrao | 34,017 | 53.54% | ▲30.76 |
| INC(U) | Ankushrao Tope | 23,307 | 36.68% | New |
| JP | Solunke Bapusaheb Sakharam | 4,214 | 6.63% | New |
| Independent | Anna Ranuji Kharat | 1,995 | 3.14% | New |
| Margin of victory | | 10,710 | 16.86% | ▲5.89 |
| Turnout | | 66,009 | 56.17% | ▼7.78 |
| Total valid votes | | 63,533 | | |
| Registered electors | | 117,516 | | ▲9.02 |
| INC(I) gain from JP | | Swing | ▲13.57 | |

=== Assembly Election 1978 ===
1978 Maharashtra Legislative Assembly election : Ambad
| Party | Candidate | Votes | % | ±% |
|---|---|---|---|---|
| JP | Solunke Bapusaheb Sakharam | 26,180 | 39.97% | New |
| INC | Ankushrao Raosaheb Tope | 18,993 | 29.00% | ▼19.85 |
| INC(I) | Bhalchandra Yeshwantrao | 14,919 | 22.78% | New |
| CPI | Bhanudas Deorao Bhojane | 3,012 | 4.60% | New |
| Independent | Anna Ranuji Kharat | 2,389 | 3.65% | New |
| Margin of victory | | 7,187 | 10.97% | ▲9.36 |
| Turnout | | 68,931 | 63.95% | ▲6.95 |
| Total valid votes | | 65,493 | | |
| Registered electors | | 107,796 | | ▲12.68 |
| JP gain from INC | | Swing | ▼8.88 | |

=== Assembly Election 1972 ===
1972 Maharashtra Legislative Assembly election : Ambad
| Party | Candidate | Votes | % | ±% |
|---|---|---|---|---|
| INC | Ankushrao Raosaheb Tope | 24,786 | 48.85% | ▼11.71 |
| Independent | Annasaheb Ambadas Udhan | 23,967 | 47.24% | New |
| ABJS | P. Dhansingh Thakur | 1,986 | 3.91% | ▼11.12 |
| Margin of victory | | 819 | 1.61% | ▼34.53 |
| Turnout | | 54,531 | 57.00% | ▲9.22 |
| Total valid votes | | 50,739 | | |
| Registered electors | | 95,669 | | ▲17.96 |
| INC hold | | Swing | ▼11.71 | |

=== Assembly Election 1967 ===
1967 Maharashtra Legislative Assembly election : Ambad
| Party | Candidate | Votes | % | ±% |
|---|---|---|---|---|
| INC | Annasaheb Ambadas Udhan | 21,126 | 60.56% | ▲10.36 |
| SSP | Bapusaheb Sakharam Solunke | 8,517 | 24.41% | New |
| ABJS | P. Dhansingh Thakur | 5,243 | 15.03% | New |
| Margin of victory | | 12,609 | 36.14% | ▲15.61 |
| Turnout | | 38,748 | 47.78% | ▲11.51 |
| Total valid votes | | 34,886 | | |
| Registered electors | | 81,105 | | ▲25.67 |
| INC hold | | Swing | ▲10.36 | |

=== Assembly Election 1962 ===
1962 Maharashtra Legislative Assembly election : Ambad
| Party | Candidate | Votes | % | ±% |
|---|---|---|---|---|
| INC | Nanasaheb Sawalaram Jedhe | 10,838 | 50.20% | ▼11.42 |
| CPI | Jagannath Alias Jaiwant S/o Kundalik Rao | 6,405 | 29.67% | ▲4.72 |
| Independent | Bhalchandra Yeshwantrao | 4,346 | 20.13% | New |
| Margin of victory | | 4,433 | 20.53% | ▼16.14 |
| Turnout | | 23,408 | 36.27% | ▲5.07 |
| Total valid votes | | 21,589 | | |
| Registered electors | | 64,536 | | ▲10.49 |
| INC hold | | Swing | ▼11.42 | |

=== Assembly Election 1957 ===
1957 Bombay State Legislative Assembly election : Ambad
| Party | Candidate | Votes | % | ±% |
|---|---|---|---|---|
| INC | Nanasaheb Sawalaram Jedhe | 11,230 | 61.62% | ▲4.47 |
| CPI | Kokil Anant Rao | 4,547 | 24.95% | New |
| Independent | Vithal Rao | 2,449 | 13.44% | New |
| Margin of victory | | 6,683 | 36.67% | ▲3.06 |
| Turnout | | 18,226 | 31.20% | ▼4.29 |
| Total valid votes | | 18,226 | | |
| Registered electors | | 58,409 | | ▲5.19 |
| INC hold | | Swing | ▲4.47 | |

=== Assembly Election 1952 ===
1952 Hyderabad State Legislative Assembly election : Ambad
| Party | Candidate | Votes | % | ±% |
|---|---|---|---|---|
| INC | Bhagwant Rao | 11,263 | 57.15% | New |
| PDF | Mohammed Salar | 4,639 | 23.54% | New |
| SCF | Bandu Laxman | 2,182 | 11.07% | New |
| ABJS | Devidas Rao | 1,132 | 5.74% | New |
| Socialist | Ramchandra Chaganlal | 492 | 2.50% | New |
| Margin of victory | | 6,624 | 33.61% | |
| Turnout | | 19,708 | 35.49% | |
| Total valid votes | | 19,708 | | |
| Registered electors | | 55,529 | | |
| INC win (new seat) | | | | |
