= Ambad =

- Town
- Location in Maharashtra, India
- Coordinates: 19.62°N 75.79°E
- Country: India
- State: Maharashtra
- District: Jalna
- Elevation: 530 m (1,740 ft)

Population (2001)
  - Total: 80,352

Languages
  - Official: Marathi
- Time zone: UTC+5:30 (IST)
- PIN: 431204
- Vehicle registration: MH-21

Ambad is a town with a municipal council in Jalna district in the state of Maharashtra, India. Ambad is notable for its temple dedicated to the Hindu goddess Matsyodari. In October of each year, devotees of the goddess gather in Ambad for the Hindu festival of Dashahara. A local tradition claims that the name "Ambad" was given to this city by a Hindu Raja named Ambarisha. According to this tradition, Raja Ambarisha would worship the goddess on a rock hill which resembled a fish. Because of this fish-shaped rock hill, the goddess was named Matsyodari ("in the stomach of fish"). The temple was constructed by Ahilya Devi Holkar, who also has developed Ambad by constructing Pushkarini and Kavandi (water reservoirs). Ambad is the second most populous town in district of Jalna. Ambad also has a Government Polytechnic College which is one of the only two Government Polytechnic Colleges located in Jalna district along with Government Polytechnic, Jalna. Ambad municipal council is convened at Court Road.

Ambad is also famous for its "Dattajayanti Sangeet Mahotsav" celebrations. The festival was started in 1923 by Pandit Bappasaheb Jalgaonkar. His son the Pandit Govindrao Jalgaonkar continued the tradition and gave it a broader appeal among masses. The festival is purely based on Indian classical music.

In the middle of the city, there's an old temple of Lord Ram where a beautiful idol of the deity was established in the 18th century by the saint and devotee, Sri Ramanand Maharaj of Gondi. Since then, people worship the Lord Ram regularly.

== Villages and cities near Ambad ==
- Jalna (27.0 km [16.8 mi])
- Pachod (20.0 km [12.4 mi])
- Ghansawangi (26.0 km [16.2 mi])
- Tirthpuri (30.0 km [18.6 mi])
- Shahagad (32.0 km [19.9 mi])
- Kumbhar Pimpalgaon (44.0 km [27.3 mi])
- Paithan (50.0 km [31.1 mi])
- Aurangabad (70.0 km [43.5 mi])
- Rajur (55.0 km [34.2 mi])
- Osmanabad (194.0 km [120.5 mi])
- Parbhani (128.0 km [79.5 mi])
- Pune (264.0 km [164.0 mi])
- Mumbai (427.0 km [265.3 mi])
- Ahmednagar (141.0 km [87.6 mi])
- Solapur (259.0 km [160.9 mi])
- Ajanta Caves (132.0 km [82.0 mi])
- Lonar Lake (107.0 km [66.5 mi])

== Nearby Railway Station ==
Jalna (J) is nearest railway station to Ambad (28 km [17 mi]). Partur (J) Railway Station to Ambad (52 km [32 mi])

== Nearby Airport ==
Aurangabad (IXU) is nearest airport to Ambad city which is 65 km (40 mi) away from Ambad.

== Health Services ==
Ambad City is home to a variety of medical facilities and hospitals, which are frequented by individuals from surrounding villages seeking medical treatment. A few of these establishments are listed below.

1. Government Hospital Ambad
2. Matsyodari Clinic Ambad (Near Bus Stand)

== Education ==
Ambad has almost all type of well known educational institutions. Which includes, Engineering, Pharmacy, Education (D.Ed & B.Ed), I.T.I., English medium schools and also colleges of arts, science, Computer, Management & Nursing. Some of them are mentioned below:

1. Government Polytechnic College
2. Ismail Mehta College of Pharmacy
3. Zilla Parishad School
4. Matsyodari College
5. Dattaji Bhale Primary School
6. Dattaji Bhale secondary School
7. Omshanti Vidyalaya
8. Virchand Lalji Dharamshi School
9. Jain English School
10. R.P. International School
11. Matsyodari High School
12. Little Champ English School
13. Godavari College
14. CSK Jain English School
15. Shree Ram Mandir

== Location ==
Ambad is situated at a distance of 28 km (17 mi) from District Jalna. Ambad has a developed connectivity of roads to nearby cities like Chhatrapati Sambhajinagar(Formerly Aurangabad), Beed, Paithan & Ghansawangi. The National Highway 52 is 20 km (12 mi) away from Ambad. Ambad will soon be connected to Hinduhridaysamrat Balasaheb Thackerey Maharashtra Samruddhi Mahamarg aka Mumbai–Nagpur Expressway from Nidhona interchange which is 34 km (21 mi) away.

== Geography ==
Ambad is located at 19.62°N 75.79°E. It has an average elevation of 530 metres (1,740 ft).

== Demographics ==
As of the 2001 India census, Ambad had a population of 80,321. Males constitute 53% of the population, and females 47%. Ambad has an average literacy rate of 65%, which is higher than the national average of 59.5%. 15% of the population is under 6 years of age.
