= Ankushrao Tope =

Indian politician

Member of Parliament, Lok Sabha
- In office 1991-1996
- Preceded by: Pundlik Hari Danve
- Succeeded by: Uttamsingh Pawar
- Constituency: Jalna

Member of Maharashtra Legislative Assembly
- In office 1972–1978
- Preceded by: A. Ambadas
- Succeeded by: Bapusaheb Sakharam Solunke
- Constituency: Ambad

Personal details
- Born: 18 September 1942
- Died: 3 April 2016 (aged 73)
- Party: Indian National Congress
- Spouse: Sharda Tope
- Children: Rajesh Tope

Ankushrao Raosaheb Tope was an Indian politician, elected to the Lok Sabha, the lower house of the Parliament of India as a member of the Indian National Congress.
