= Partur =

- Town
- Nickname: Partur
- Location in Maharashtra, India
- Coordinates: 19°35′28″N 76°12′58″E
- Country: India
- State: Maharashtra
- District: Jalna

Government
  - Type: Municipal council
- Elevation: 439 m (1,440 ft)

Population (2011)
  - Total: 35,883

Languages
  - Official: Marathi
- Time zone: UTC+5:30 (IST)
- PIN: 431501
- Telephone code: 912484-XXXXXX
- Vehicle registration: MH-21

Partur is a town with municipal council in Jalna district in the Indian state of Maharashtra.

Earlier, it was known as Pralhadpur, but the name was later changed to Partur due to misspelling.

== Geography ==
Partur is located at 19.35°N 76.12°E. It has an average elevation of 439 metres (1440 feet). Godavari is a major river that flows through various villages of Partur. Near Dudhana river Upper Dudhana Dam. Bageshvari Sugar Factory, Warfal in Partur. The main source of income is agriculture. Most of the people in this area are farmers. Major crops are cotton, arhat, sorghum, wheat, sugar cane.

== Demographics ==
=== Religion ===
As of 2011 India census, Partur Municipal Council has a population of 35,883 of which 18,401 are males while 17,482 are females.

The Literacy rate of Partur city is 79.52%, lower than Maharashtra state average of 82.34%. In Partur, male literacy is around 86.03% while female literacy rate is 72.72%.

In Partur, 14.13% of the population is under 6 years of age. Partur has Female Sex Ratio is of 950 higher than state average of 929.

Schedule Caste (SC) constitutes 10.57% while Schedule Tribe (ST) were 3.77% of total population in Partur.

Religions in Partur
Religion	Percent
Hindus	55.79%
Muslims	37.96%
Buddhists	5.43%
Jains	0.36%
Sikhs	0.26%
No Religion	0.13%
Distribution of religions †Includes Christians(0.07%)

=== Language ===
Marathi is the official language of the town. Marathi is also the most commonly spoken language in the town, Urdu is the second most spoken language followed by Hindi.

== Transportation ==
=== Rail ===
Partur railway station (Code: PTU) is located on the Kacheguda-Manmad line under Nanded Division of South Central Railway (SCR) jurisdiction. Partur is well connected through rail with Mumbai, Nashik, Pune, Aurangabad, Jalna, Hyderabad, Nanded, Nagpur, Manmad, Latur, Parbhani, Parli Vaijnath, Osmanabad, Mudkhed, Adilabad, Basar, Nizamabad, Daund etc. Ajanta Express between Secunderabad and Manmad is the most prestigious train passing through this station. The Nanded (NED)-Amritsar Sachkhand Express and Madurai-Manmad Express (now Rameswaram-Okha Exp) do not stop at Partur. The revenue collection of the Partur railway station is highest among the taluka/tehsil level railway stations on the manmad secunderabad railway line.

=== Road ===
Partur is well connected to Pune, Aurangabad, Akola, Nanded, Latur, Hyderabad through state road transport. Partur depot of state transport corporation was the most profitable in the year 2010. And also Partur is now connected to NH548C.

=== Air ===
The nearest airports are Chikalthana Airport located at Aurangabad Airport (120 km) and Nanded Airport (145 km).

== Education ==
Jawahar Navodaya Vidyalaya known as JNVs are a system of alternate schools for gifted students in India is situated in Partur.

Several other schools are listed below:

=== Marathi & Semi English Medium School ===
1. Lal Bahadur Shastri High School.
2. Swami Vivekanand High School.
3. Zila Parishad High School.
4. Yoganand high School.
5. Lalbahadur Shastri Kanya High School.
6. Adarsh primary School

=== Urdu Medium School ===
1. Maulana Mohammad Ali Johar Urdu Primary School.
2. Abdul Wahed Bapu Deshmukh High School (Warphal 5 km away from Partur)
3. Al-Huda Urdu School.
4. Dr. Zakir Hussain High School
5. Dr. Zakir Hussain Primary School

=== English Medium School ===
1. Vivekananda English School & Public School
2. Swami Vivekanand Primary School
3. Bright Star English Primary & High School
4. Maharana Primary School
5. Universal peace English school
6. New Era international English School
7. Dnyanlata Public School

=== Colleges ===
1. Shivraj Arts, Commerce and Science College Partur (Dr. Babasaheb Ambedkar Marathwada University, Aurangabad)
2. Lal Bahadur Shastri Arts, Commerce and Science jr. College. (State Board )
3. Lal Bahadur Shastri Arts, Commerce and Science Sr. College. (Dr. Babasaheb Ambedkar Marathwada University, Aurangabad)
4. Bhanudasrao Chavan Arts, Commerce and Science College.(Dr. Babasaheb Ambedkar Marathwada University, Aurangabad)
5. Sharda Nursing College Partur
6. Yoganand jr. college. (Dr. Babasaheb Ambedkar Marathwada University, Aurangabad)
7. Dr. Zakir Hussain Junior College
8. Rajkunwar Jr College Partur (State Board )

== Banks ==
Partur is the important financial hub in Jalna district. State Bank of India is one of the oldest Nationalised bank in City. Many other Banks provides financial services to farmers, businessmen and the residents of the town.

List of the banks in Partur is as follows:

1. State Bank of India
2. Bank of Maharashtra
3. Canara Bank
4. Maharashtra Gramin Bank
5. Sangali Urban Co-Operative Bank Ltd.
6. Dinadayal Nagri Sahakari Bank Ltd.
7. Axis Bank Limited
8. ICICI Bank
9. The Jalna District Central Cooperative Bank Ltd. Piartur

There are 5-6 ATMs operating in the city.

=== Multistate ===
1. Vijaya Urban Multistate Co-operative Credit Society Ltd, Majalgoan
2. Dnyanradha Multistate Co.Opp.Credit Society, Beed
3. Shubh Kalyan MultiState Co-Op Credit Society Ltd, Havargoan
4. Shri Padmavati Mata Multistate Co-Op Credit Society Ltd, Rahuri
5. Rajarshi Shahu Maharaj Multistate Urban Credit Co-Operative Society Ltd, Majalgaon

Icici bank, which is a leading private sector Bank, provides all types of loan to its customers
