= Ghansawangi =

Coordinates: 19.521°N 75.990°E

- City
- Interactive map of Ghansawangi
- Country: India
- State: Maharashtra
- District: Jalna
- Established: 15 August 1995

Population
  - Total: 40,000

Languages
  - Official: Marathi
- Time zone: UTC+5:30 (IST)
- Postal code: 431209
- Vehicle registration: MH-21
- Nearest city: Ghansawangi

Ghansawangi or Ghansavangi is a city and a tehsil in the Partur subdivision of the Jalna district in the state of Maharashtra, India. Its distance from Aurangabad (by road and on highway) is about 60 kilometers.

Ghansavangi is within the Parbhani Loksabha constituency. Parbhani consists of Jintur, Gangakhed, Partur, Pathri and Parbhani Assembly constituencies. Hikamat Udhan, the Health Minister in the Maharashtra state government, represents the Ghansawangi assembly constituency.

Gurupimpri is one of the oldest villages in Ghansawangi tehsil.
