= Badnapur =

- Tehsil
- Badnapur
- Location in Maharashtra, India
- Coordinates: 19°52′N 75°50′E
- Country: India
- State: Maharashtra
- District: Jalna
- Established: August 1992

Government
  - Type: Municipal Council

Language
  - Official: Marathi
- Time zone: UTC+5:30 (IST)
- Postal code: 431 202
- Vehicle registration: MH-21
- Website: https://badnapurmahaulb.maharashtra.gov.in/ https://jalna.gov.in/about-district/administrative-setup/tehsil/

Badnapur is a town and a tehsil in Jalna subdivision of Jalna district in the state of Maharashtra, India.

Badnapur is Commonly famous for Farmer's and Noor Hospital, it is a private Hospital which provide free facilities.

It has a railway station on the Manmad - Aurangabad - Hyderabad route.

== History ==
It was here in 1803 that Arthur Wellesley and James Stevenson met prior to the Battle of Assaye.
