= Western Maharashtra (Desh) =

Geographical and cultural region in Maharashtra, India

Coordinates: 19.55°N 76.°E

Desh Western Maharashtra
- Geographical and cultural region
- Paschim Maharashtra
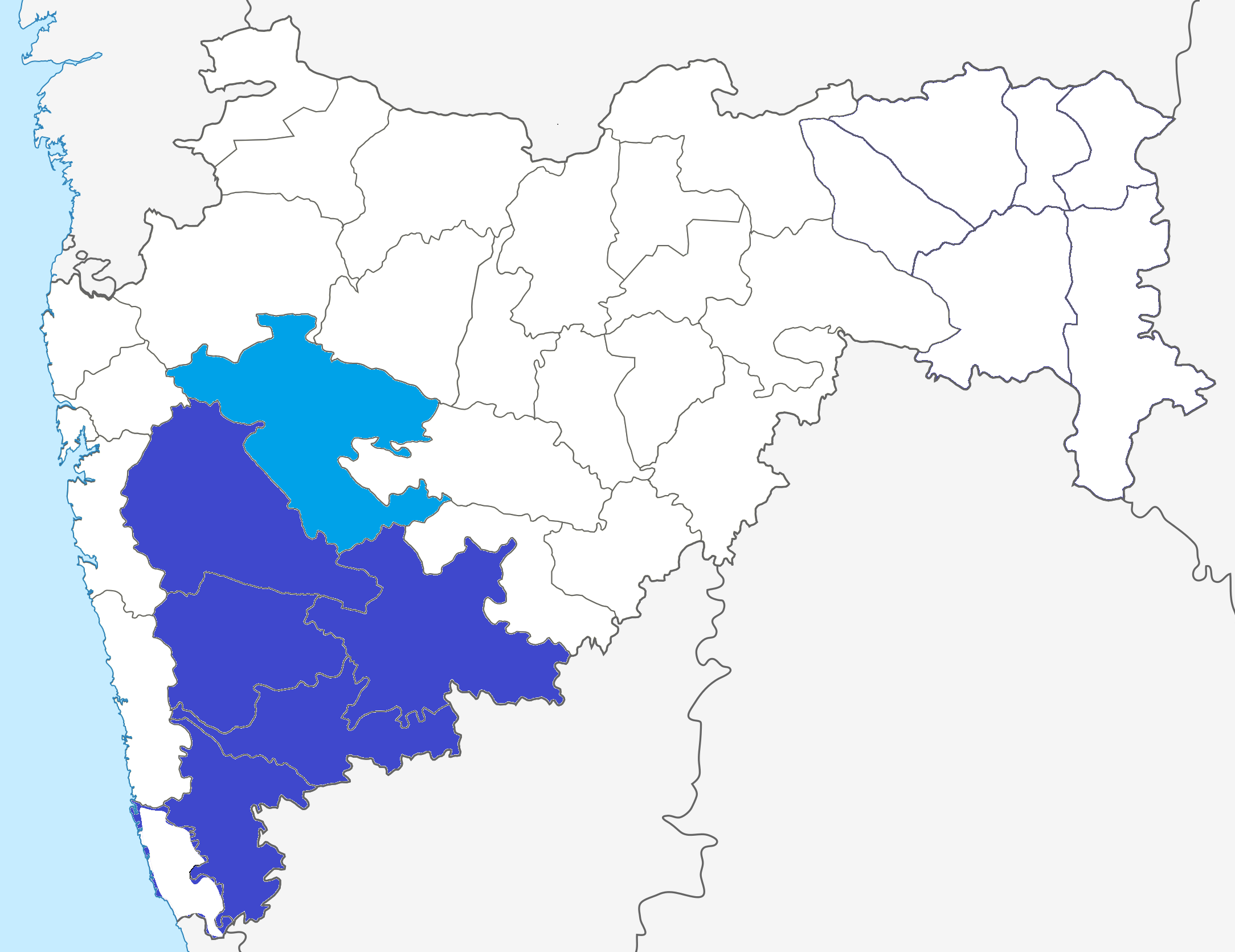
- Location map of the Desh (Western Maharashtra) region
- Interactive map of Desh
- Country: India
- State: Maharashtra
- Largest city: Pune
- Districts: Pune, Satara, Kolhapur, Sangli, Solapur, Ahilyanagar (partially)

Area
  - Total: 58,268 km^{2} (22,497 sq mi)
- (Corresponds to Pune Division administrative area)

Population (2011 census)
  - Total: 23,449,049
  - Density: 402.43/km^{2} (1,042.3/sq mi)

Desh, also widely known as Western Maharashtra or Paschim Maharashtra, is a major geographical, cultural, and socioeconomic region adjacent to the Western Ghats on the west-central Deccan Plateau within the state of Maharashtra, India. Geographically, the region lies primarily between the upper catchments of the Godavari River and the Krishna River. It features a hilly terrain along the Sahyadri range that slopes gently eastward, drained thoroughly by the upper stretches of the Krishna, Godavari, and Bhima rivers alongside their tributaries.

Administratively and economically, modern Desh aligns closely with the Pune administrative division, encompassing an area of 58,268 square kilometres (22,497 sq mi) and recording a population of 23,449,049 as per the official census. The region stands as one of India's most highly urbanized and economically prosperous areas, anchored by Pune, which acts as its chief industrial and educational engine. It is heavily driven by industrial manufacturing, information technology hubs, and a powerful rural economy dominated by automated sugar cooperatives.

== Etymology and scope ==
In the historical context of Maharashtra, the term "Desh" is a truncation of "Maharashtra-desh", referring to the core plateau territory of the Maratha people. Historically, it distinguished the flat tablelands and river valleys of the Deccan Plateau from the narrow coastal strip of the Konkan below the Ghats and the northern territory of Khandesh.

Culturally and linguistically, the territory is the home of the Deshastha Brahmin community and the distinct "Deshi" dialect of the Marathi language. Geographically, the core of Desh corresponds to the modern districts of Pune, Satara, Kolhapur, Sangli, and Solapur. Historically, parts of Ahilya Nagar and Nashik were also grouped under this designation before modern administrative boundaries separated the Nashik division. Neighboring Marathwada is treated as a distinct region because it developed along a different historical trajectory under the rule of the Nizam of Hyderabad.

== History ==
=== Early and medieval periods ===
Prior to the rise of regional local powers, the flat tablelands and river valleys of the Desh plateau were governed by several prominent early and medieval Deccan dynasties. The ancient Satavahana dynasty, followed by the Vakataka dynasty, established foundational administrative networks across the upper Godavari and Krishna basins. Control later transitioned sequentially to the Chalukyas, the Rashtrakuta dynasty, and the Yadavas of Devagiri, under whose patronages the regional socio-religious landscape matured. Following the collapse of the Yadava kingdom, the region came under the orbit of the Delhi Sultanate, which subsequently splintered into independent Deccan Sultanates—primarily the Adil Shahi dynasty of Bijapur and the Nizam Shahi dynasty of Ahmadnagar—who administered the Desh through local chieftains and land-owning elites (deshmukhs).

=== Maratha era ===
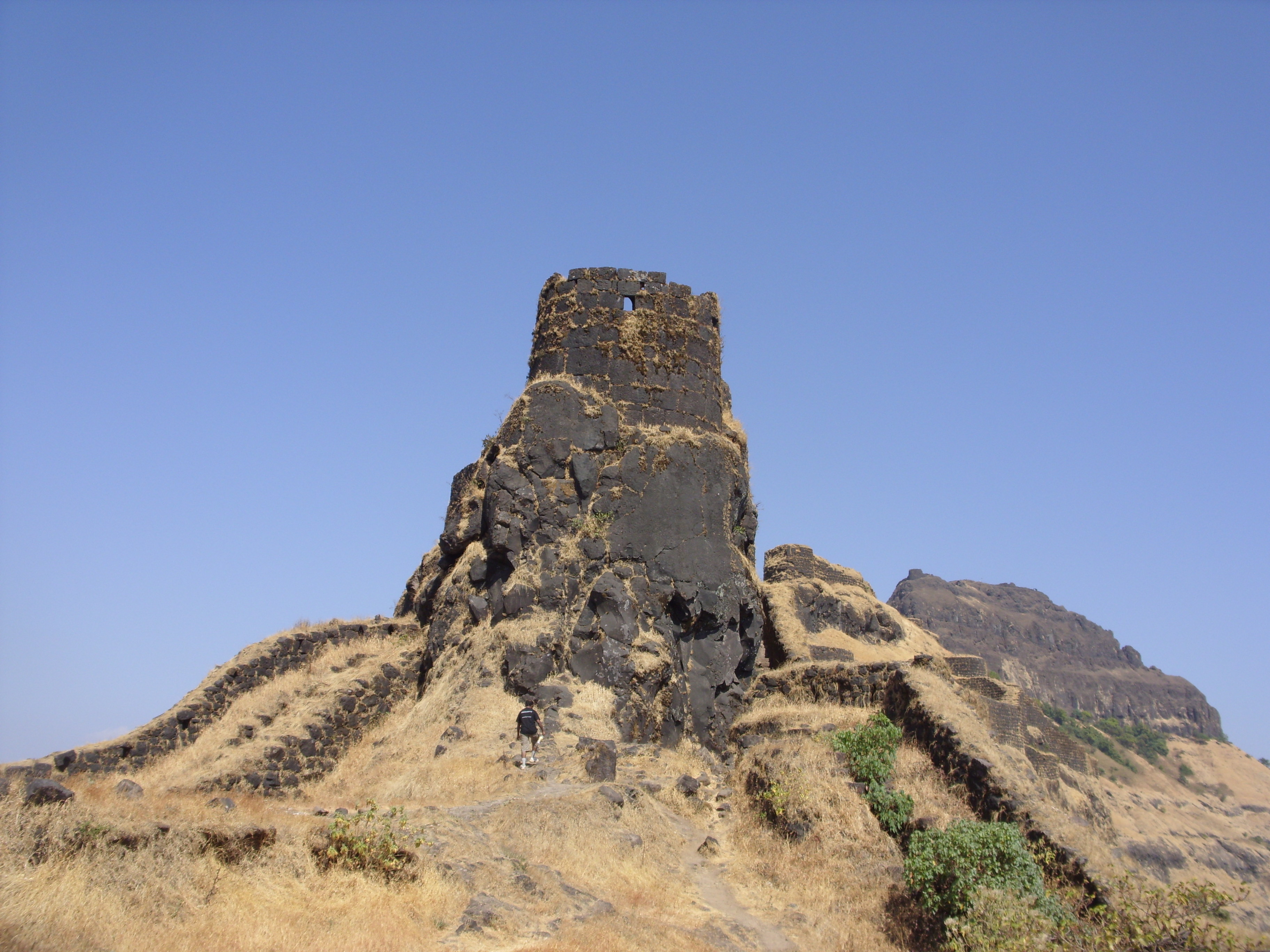
Rajgad Fort in Pune district served as the first capital of the Maratha Kingdom during Chhatrapati Shivaji's reign.

In the mid-17th century, the Desh region emerged as the primary geopolitical base for the establishment of the Maratha Empire. Exploiting the rugged topography of the Western Ghats (Sahyadri range) and drawing support from local infantry forces, Shivaji initiated campaigns against both the Adil Shahi authorities and the Mughal Empire, culminating in his coronation as Chhatrapati at Raigad Fort in 1674. The high concentration of defensive hill forts across districts like Pune, Satara, and Kolhapur made the plateau the strategic core of the state.

During the 18th century, executive authority progressively shifted from the lineage of Shivaji to the hereditary Peshwa (prime ministers), who established their administrative headquarters at the Shaniwar Wada in Pune. Under the Peshwas, the Maratha domain functioned as a loose confederacy containing distinct centers of power, with the historic cities of Satara and Kolhapur maintaining separate branches of the Chhatrapati lineage.

=== British colonial administration ===
The regional dominance of the Maratha Confederacy concluded in 1818 following its defeat by the British East India Company in the Third Anglo-Maratha War. The Peshwa's primary dominions were dissolved and directly annexed into the expanding Bombay Presidency. However, to ensure local stability, British authorities permitted several native Maratha principalities to continue operating under internal autonomy via subsidiary alliance frameworks; these included the Kolhapur State, Sangli State, and Miraj State, alongside a restored kingdom at Satara. The princely state of Satara was eventually integrated into direct British rule in 1848 through the application of the Doctrine of Lapse. Under British rule, the Desh plateau became known for early nationalist and social reform movements led by local figures representing diverse ideological and social viewpoints.

=== Post-independence period ===
Following Indian independence and the subsequent partition of the subcontinent in 1947, the British administrative boundaries were converted into the Indian state of Bombay. The various autonomous princely states of the Deccan were formally integrated into the state's existing district structures. In May 1960, following the linguistic reorganization of Indian states driven by the Samyukta Maharashtra movement, Bombay State was dissolved. The Desh region was subsequently integrated as the central demographic and political block of the newly established Marathi-speaking state of Maharashtra.

== Geography and climate ==
=== Topography and elevation ===
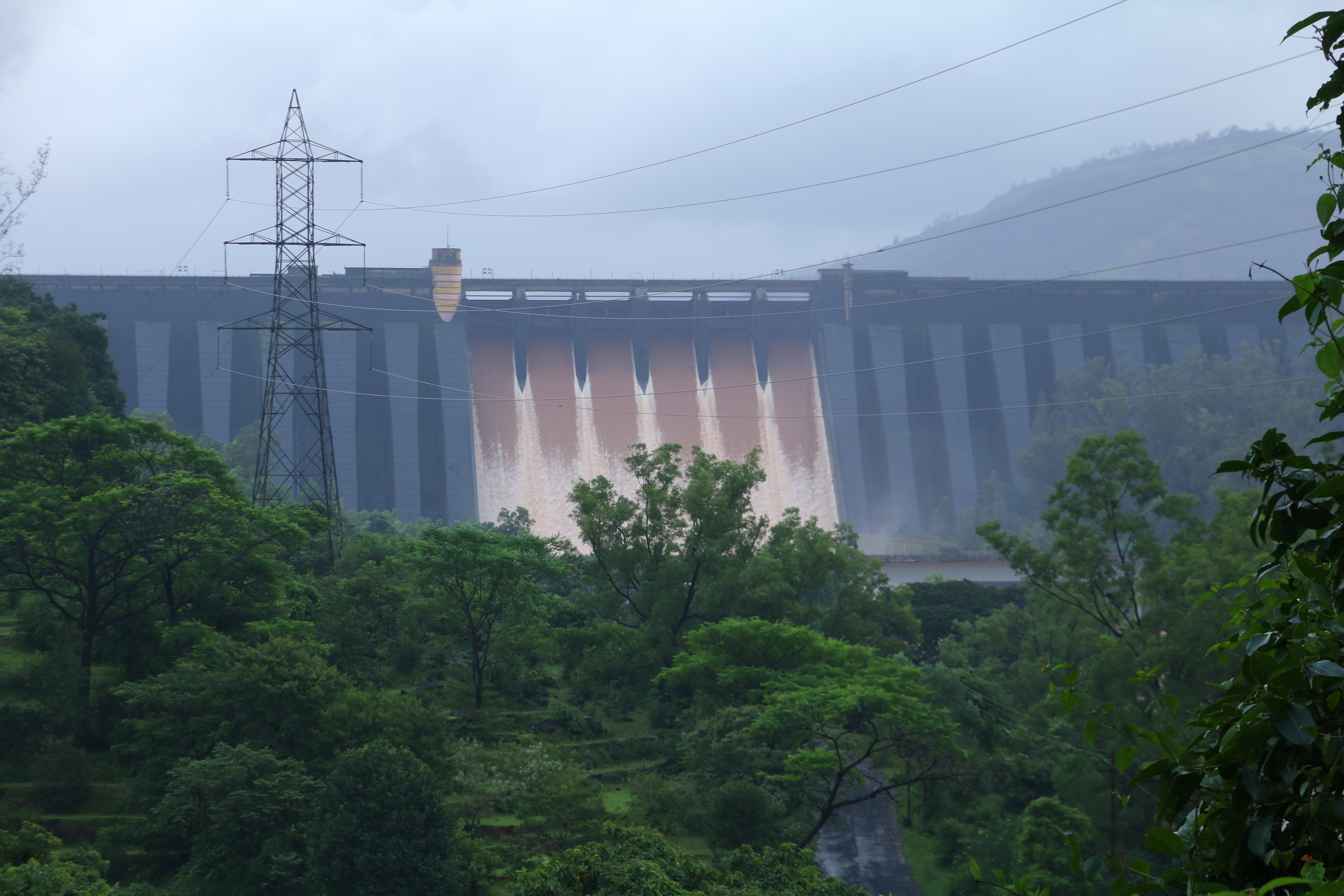
The Koyna Dam reservoir (Shivsagar Lake) provides extensive irrigation and hydroelectricity to Paschim Maharashtra.

The Desh region occupies the west-central portion of the Deccan Plateau, lying on the immediate leeward (eastern) side of the Sahyadri range, widely known as the Western Ghats. The physical relief of the region transitions from a rugged, heavily forested, and deeply dissected mountainous terrain along its western periphery (known locally as the Ghatmatha) into vast, rolling tablelands that gently slope eastward toward the broader peninsular plains. The average elevation of the plateau floor ranges between 450 and 700 metres above mean sea level, though individual mountain crests and prominent offshoots branching east from the main Sahyadri range—such as the Harishchandra-Balaghat and Mahadeo hills—regularly exceed 1,000 metres.

=== Hydrology and drainage basins ===
The region serves as an expansive upstream watershed for several of peninsular India's most critical river networks. The two primary drainage systems shaping the geography of Desh are:

- The Krishna River Basin: Originating at Mahabaleshwar in the high Sahyadris of the Satara district, the Krishna River flows southeastward through the Sangli and Kolhapur districts. It is fed by major perennial and semi-perennial tributaries, including the Koyna, Venna, Warna, and Panchganga rivers.
- The Bhima River Basin: Draining the central and eastern plains of modern Desh, the Bhima River originates at Bhimashankar in the Pune district. It encompasses the expansive Upper Bhima catchment area spanning approximately 46,000 square kilometres across the Pune, Ahmednagar, and Solapur districts before eventually converging with the Krishna River outside state boundaries.

Hydrological infrastructure heavily dictates regional resource management. Large-scale reservoirs—most notably the Shivsagar Lake impounded by the Koyna Dam and the Yashwant Sagar reservoir created by the Ujani Dam—serve as dual-purpose systems providing flood mitigation, substantial hydroelectric power generation, and essential surface-water canal networks for the agrarian interior.

=== Climate and soil allocation ===
The climate of Desh is fundamentally governed by the orographic barrier of the Western Ghats, causing a drastic meteorological gradient over a distance of less than 100 kilometres:

- The Humid Western Fringe: The high-altitude ridges capture the brunt of the advancing Southwest monsoon (June to September), recording heavy annual precipitation levels ranging from 2,000 mm to over 6,000 mm.
- The Semi-Arid Rain-Shadow Plateau: As the air mass descends down the leeward slopes, it warms and loses relative humidity, creating a pronounced semi-arid rain-shadow zone across the central and eastern districts. Annual precipitation in areas like eastern Pune, Ahmednagar, and Solapur drops abruptly to between 500 mm and 700 mm, characterized by erratic distribution and frequent seasonal dry spells.

The regional lithology is dominated by the thick basaltic rock layers of the Deccan Traps. Over time, weathering of these volcanic formations has produced distinct soil types. The lower river valleys and flat basin floors feature deep, fertile, moisture-retentive black cotton soils (regur), which support intensive perennial cash-crop cultivation. Conversely, the upland hills and intervening ridges are characterized by shallow, coarse, and highly permeable gravelly soils that are prone to rapid desaturation during the dry winter and summer months.

== Economy ==
Desh is an economic powerhouse within Maharashtra, consistently generating a massive portion of the state's Gross State Domestic Product (GSDP). As detailed in the official Economic Survey of Maharashtra 2025-26 published by the Directorate of Economics and Statistics, the state economy grew at 7.9%, driven heavily by the manufacturing and services output concentrated within the core districts of Desh. The regional layout is characterized by a balance between advanced industrial metropolitan zones and a highly structured, cash-crop-dominated agrarian economy.

=== Industrial and IT sectors ===
The macro-economy of modern Desh is anchored by the Pune Metropolitan Region (PMR), which is recognized as one of India's premier industrial manufacturing and Information Technology hubs. In alignment with the Maharashtra Industries, Investment & Services Policy 2025, massive industrial clusters managed by the Maharashtra Industrial Development Corporation (MIDC) run across Hinjawadi, Pimpri-Chinchwad, Chakan, and Ranjangaon, hosting thousands of Micro, Small, and Medium Enterprises (MSMEs).

The primary secondary and tertiary engines of the region are distributed as follows:

Automotive and Engineering: The Pimpri-Chinchwad-Chakan belt operates as one of the largest automotive manufacturing ecosystems in South Asia, hosting corporate manufacturing setups for Tata Motors, Bajaj Auto, and Mercedes-Benz.

Information Technology: The Rajiv Gandhi Infotech Park at Hinjawadi houses multinational technology conglomerates and software export infrastructure, serving as a pillar of the service sector's growth in Maharashtra.

Textiles and Heavy Engineering: Beyond Pune, Solapur is a historic center for textile manufacturing, recognized globally for its automated handloom hubs and Solapur chadar production. Simultaneously, Kolhapur is celebrated for its metallurgical engineering foundries and traditional handcrafted leather industries.

=== Agriculture and sugar cooperatives ===
The agrarian economy of rural Desh functions via an intensely developed perennial river network and major surface-water canal storage projects. The region forms the structural heartland of India's sugar cooperative movement. Local sugarcane cultivators organized into financially powerful cooperative societies own and manage massive sugar processing mills, allowing the rural community to exercise significant influence over state-level economic policies.

Aside from sugarcane, the region is highly commercialized and leads the state in high-value horticulture and cash-crop exports:

Grapes and Viticulture: Centered around the vineyards of Pune, Sangli, and neighboring areas, the region supports a large percentage of India's wine processing infrastructure.

Pomegranates: Extensively cultivated in the semi-arid, rain-shadow expanses of Solapur, which leverages drip-irrigation models to handle erratic monsoon precipitation levels.

Turmeric and Dairy Production: Sangli operates as a premier wholesale trading hub for turmeric in western India, while Kolhapur leads the state in mechanized dairy cooperative collection networks.

=== Regional macroeconomic profile ===
The disparity between urbanized centers like Pune and the arid agrarian interior is reflected in the official district-wise Gross District Domestic Product (GDDP) and socioeconomic indicators published by the Planning Department:

Macroeconomic Indicators of the Core Desh Region (2025–26 Data Estimates)
Core District	Industrial Profile	Key Economic Output	Sown Area Utilization	Electrification / Per Capita Credit Rank
Pune	Heavy Industrial / IT	Automobiles, Software Services, Engineering	Moderate	Tier-1 High
Solapur	Textiles / Agrarian	Solapur Chadars, Pomegranates, Sugar	High (Semi-Arid)	Tier-2 Moderate
Kolhapur	Foundries / Dairy	Castings, Dairy Cooperatives, Footwear	High (Irrigated)	Tier-2 High
Satara	Agrarian / Tourism	Sugarcane, Turmeric, Eco-tourism	Moderate	Tier-3 Moderate
Sangli	Agro-Processing	Turmeric Trading, Viticulture, Sugar	High	Tier-2 Moderate

== Administration and administrative units ==
=== Tiered administrative layout ===
The governance framework of the Desh region functions through a structured, nested hierarchy implemented by the Government of Maharashtra to balance urban development and rural public works. The core of Paschim Maharashtra is managed directly via the Pune Revenue Division, which serves as the principal intermediary bracket between the state secretariat and individual municipal engines.

The overarching administrative systems operate across four distinct levels:

Divisional Level: Supervised by a senior Indian Administrative Service (IAS) officer designated as the Divisional Commissioner, who coordinates inter-district resources, public security measures, and regional budget monitoring across the component territories.

District Level (Zilla): Led by a District Collector (District Magistrate) responsible for general administration, land revenue processing, and law enforcement oversight. Parallel to this, rural socio-economic planning is directed by the Chief Executive Officer (CEO) of the Zilla Parishad.

Sub-Divisional and Taluka Level: Handled by Sub-Divisional Officers (SDOs) and Tehsildars (Taluka Magistrates) who manage the primary land records, localized dispute resolution, and state welfare program distribution networks.

Grassroots Level: Governed via Block Development Officers (BDOs) within Panchayat Samitis and Gram Panchayats across rural villages, while urban infrastructure falls under Municipal Corporations (Mahanagar Palikas) and Municipal Councils (Nagar Parishads).

=== Administrative counts and subdivisions ===
The geographical scope of the core Desh plateau features an established system of 5 principal districts, which are further partitioned into 58 distinct talukas (sub-districts). This setup manages over 23 million citizens, organizing administrative offices across both major industrial metros and rural agro-processing belts:

Pune District: Serves as the central administrative seat of the division. It contains 14 distinct talukas: Pune City, Haveli, Khed, Ambegaon, Junnar, Shirur, Daund, Indapur, Baramati, Purandar, Bhor, Velhe, Mulshi, and Maval. Urban metrics are managed across 2 separate Municipal Corporations: the Pune Municipal Corporation (PMC) and the Pimpri-Chinchwad Municipal Corporation (PCMC).

Kolhapur District: Comprises 12 talukas managing the southern plateau basins: Karveer, Kagal, Shahuwadi, Radhanagari, Panhala, Hatkanangle, Shirol, Bhudargad, Ajara, Gadhinglaj, Chandgad, and Gaganbawada.

Solapur District: Organizes governance systems across 11 talukas designed around semi-arid agricultural needs: Solapur North, Solapur South, Barshi, Akkalkot, Mohol, Mangalwedha, Pandharpur, Sangola, Madha, Karmala, and Malshiras.

Satara District: Divided into 11 talukas tracking the central Sahyadri leeward slopes: Satara, Karad, Wai, Mahabaleshwar, Phaltan, Khandala, Koregaon, Khatav, Man, Jaoli, and Patan.

Sangli District: Contains 10 talukas structured around the lower Krishna catchment area: Miraj, Tasgaon, Khanapur (Vita), Atpadi, Kavathemahankal, Walwa (Islampur), Shirala, Kadegaon, Palus, and Sanjath (Sanjat).

=== Centralized metric overview ===
The balance of rural and urban local administration units across the foundational blocks of the region is distributed according to verified structural counts:

Institutional Grid of Administrative Units in Paschim Maharashtra
Core District Name	Revenue Taluka Count	Municipal Corporations	Village Panchayats (Approx)	Primary Administrative Headquarters
Pune	14	2	1400	Pune City
Kolhapur	12	1	1020	Kolhapur
Solapur	11	1	1140	Solapur
Satara	11	0	1500	Satara
Sangli	10	1	700	Sangli
Totals	58	5	5760	—

== Politics ==
Politics in Paschim Maharashtra is linked with the cooperative movement. Most of the sugar cooperative factories in western Maharashtra work as power centers and play a major role in politics. Sangli District has a major political climate in the region.
