= Aurangabad division =

Aurangabad division Marathwada
- Chhatrapati Sambhajinagar division
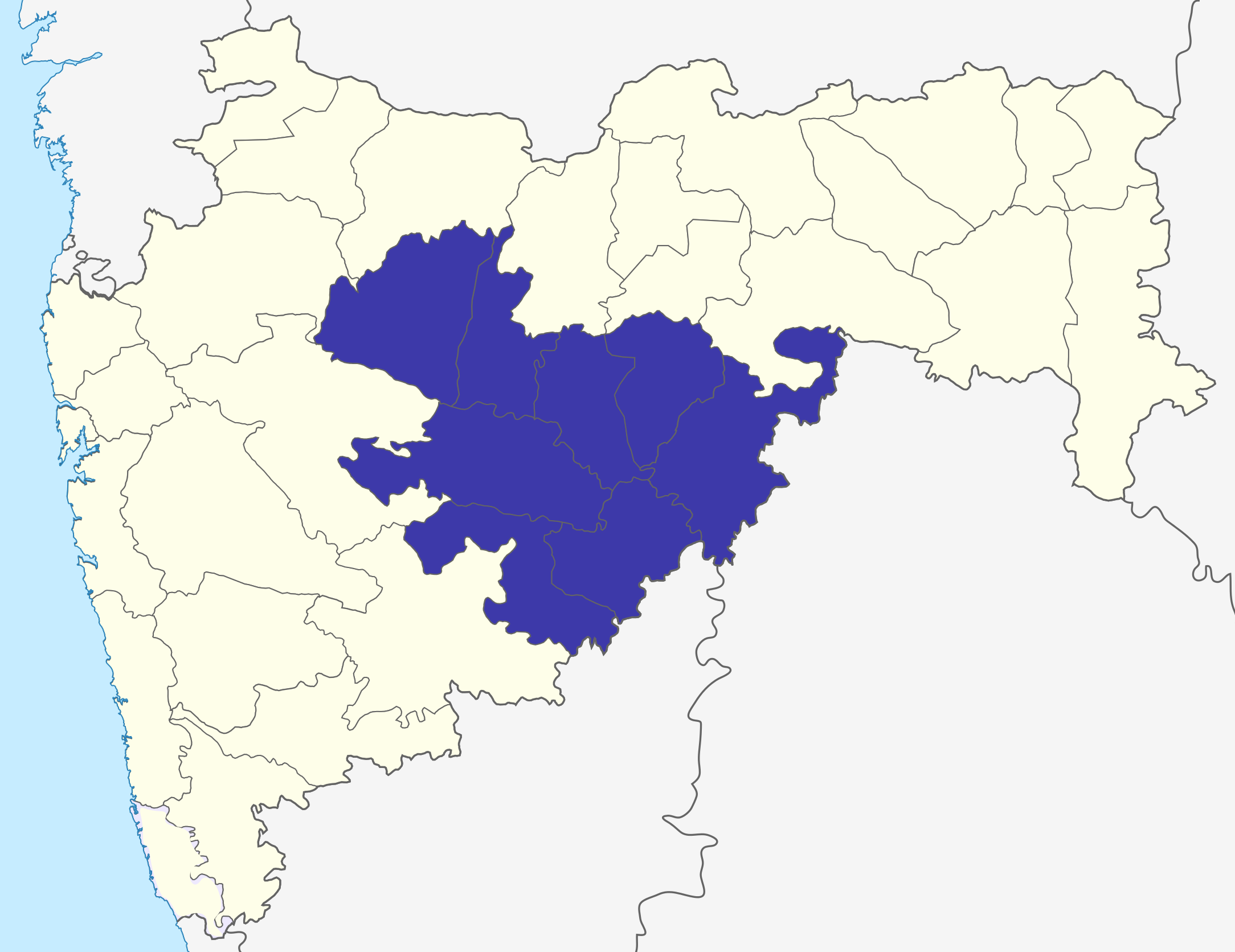
- Aurangabad
- Coordinates: 19°53′19.63″N 75°20′36.37″E
- Country: India
- State: Maharashtra
- Districts: Aurangabad district; Nanded district; Jalna district; Osmanabad district; Latur district; Beed district; Parbhani district; Hingoli district

Government
  - Commissioner Aurangabad Division: G Sreekanth (IAS)
  - Police Commissioner Aurangabad Division: NA
  - All Guardian Minister Aurangabad Division: Subhash Desai; (Aurangabad District): Ashok Chavan; (Nanded District): Pankaja Munde; (Jalna District): Shankarrao Gadakh; (Osmanabad District): Amit Deshmukh; (Latur District): Dhananjay Munde; (Beed District): Dhananjay Munde (additional charge); (Parbhani District): Varsha Gaikwad; (Hingoli District)
  - All District Collector's Aurangabad Division: Sunil Chavan (IAS); (Aurangabad District): Abhijit Rajendra Raut (IAS); (Nanded District): Asmita Mittal (IAS); (Jalna District): Kaustubh Diwegaonkar (IAS); (Osmanabad District): Prithviraj B.P (IAS); (Latur District): Radhabinod A. Sharma (IAS); (Beed District): D. M. Mugalikar (IAS); (Parbhani District): Jitendra Papalkar (IAS); (Hingoli District)
  - All MP's Aurangabad Division: NA

Area
  - Total: 64,590.58 km^{2} (24,938.56 sq mi)

Population (2011)
  - Total: 18,731,872

Languages
  - Language: Marathi (official); Urdu; Hindi; Lambadi
- Literacy: 76.49%

Aurangabad division, officially renamed as Chhatrapati Sambhajinagar division and also known as Marathwada division, is one of the six administrative divisions of the state of Maharashtra in India. It represents the Marathwada region of Maharashtra and is synonymous with it.

== Demographics ==
Aurangabad division has total area of 64,590 km^{2} and had a population of 18,731,872 at the time of the 2011 census of India. (Note: Aurangabad Division is not separate political or administrative entity so there is no reference of population by name of "Aurangabad Division", population has been calculated by adding population of 8 districts of Aurangabad Division.)

=== Languages ===
Languages of Aurangabad Division (2011)
1. Marathi (78.0%)
2. Urdu (9.56%)
3. Hindi (6.49%)
4. Lambadi (3.20%)
5. Others (2.77%)

At the time of the 2011 Census of India, the territory making up Aurangabad Division had a variety of languages. 77.98% of the population spoke Marathi, 9.56% Urdu, 6.49% Hindi and 3.20% Lambadi as their first language.

=== Religion ===
Hinduism is the majority religion in Aurangabad Division, with Islam and Buddhism being significant minorities. In urban areas of Aurangabad Division, the Muslim population exceeds 25%, notably in cities such as Aurangabad itself, where it stands at around 30%. This is higher than the division's average population of 18%. Sikhism has a significant presence in Nanded, meanwhile Jains are present in urban areas of Marathwada such as Aurangabad, Jalna and Osmanabad.

At the time of the 2011 Census of India, 76.68% of the population of Aurangabad Division followed Hinduism, 15.13% Islam, 7.17% Buddhism, 0.22% Christianity and the remaining 0.81% of the population followed other religions or stated no religion. (Note: Aurangabad Division is not separate political or administrative entity so there is no reference of population by name of "Aurangabad Division", population for each religion has been calculated by adding population of 8 districts of Aurangabad Division.)

Religion in Aurangabad Division (2011)
1. Hinduism (76.7%)
2. Islam (15.1%)
3. Buddhism (7.17%)
4. Christianity (0.22%)
5. Other or not stated (0.81%)

== Districts ==
- Aurangabad
- Beed
- Jalna
- Latur
- Hingoli
- Parbhani
- Osmanabad
- Nanded
