= Jalna district =

Coordinates: 19°50′N 75°53′E

- District of Maharashtra
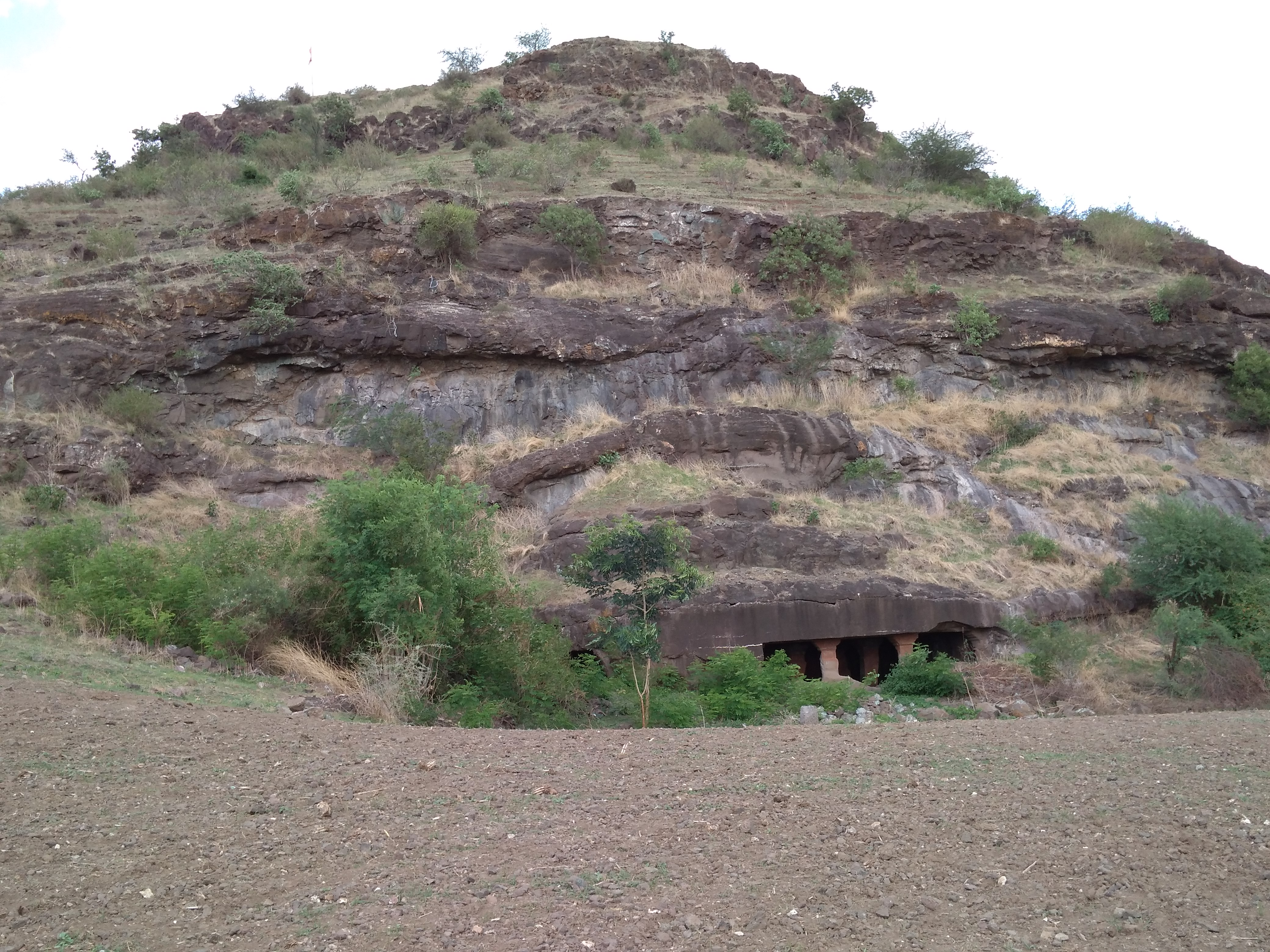
- Satavahana ruins in Rohilagad
- Nickname: Golden Crib/hammock
- Interactive map of Jalna district
- Country: India
- State: Maharashtra
- Division: Jalna
- Established: 1 May 1981
- Headquarters: Jalna

Government
  - Body: Jalna Zilla Parishad
  - Guardian Minister: Pankaja Munde (Cabinet Minister Mha)
  - President Zilla Parishad: President 'Vacant; Vice President Vacant
  - District Collector: Smt.Ashima Mittal (IAS)
  - CEO Zilla Parishad: Mrs. Minnu. P. M (IAS)
  - MPs: Kalyan Kale (Jalna); Sanjay Haribhau Jadhav (Parbhani)

Area
  - Total: 7,687 km^{2} (2,968 sq mi)

Population (2011)
  - Total: 1,959,046
  - Density: 209/km^{2} (540/sq mi)

Languages
  - Official: Marathi
- Time zone: UTC+5:30 (IST)
- Postal code: 431203/431213
- ISO 3166 code: IN-MH
- Tehsils: 1. Jalna 2. Ambad, 3. Bhokardan, 4. Badnapur, 5. Ghansawangi, 6. Partur, 7. Mantha, 8. Jafrabad
- Lok Sabha: 1. Jalna (shared with Aurangabad district) 2. Parbhani (shared with Parbhani district)
- Website: jalna.gov.in

Jalna district (Marathi pronunciation: [d͡ʒaːlnaː]) is an administrative district in the state of Maharashtra in western India. Jalna city is the district headquarters. The district is part of Aurangabad division.

== Administration ==
=== Members of parliament ===
- Kalyan Kale (INC)
  (Jalna)
- Sanjay Haribhau Jadhav (SS(UBT))
  (Parbhani)

=== Guardian Minister ===
Guardian Minister Jalna
- पालकमंत्री जालना
- Emblem of India
- Incumbent; Pankaja Munde since 19 January 2025
- Style: The Honourable
- Residence: Jalna
- Appointer: Chief Minister of Maharashtra
- Term length: 5 years / No time limit
- Website: jalna.gov.in/en/

List of guardian ministers
Name	Term of office
Babanrao Lonikar	31 October 2014 - 8 November 2019
Rajesh Tope	9 January 2020 - 29 June 2022
Atul Save	24 September 2022 - 15 October 2024
Pankaja Munde	19 January 2025 - Incumbent

=== District Magistrate/Collector ===
District Magistrate / Collector Jalna
- जिल्हाधिकारी तथा जिल्हदंडाधिकरी जालना
- Emblem of India
- Incumbent; Smt. Ashima Mittal. (IAS) since 2025
- Residence: At Jalna district
- Appointer: Government of Maharashtra
- Term length: No time limit
- Website: jalna.gov.in/en/

List of district magistrates / collectors
Name	Term of office
Smt. Ashima Mittal I.A.S.	2025 - Incumbent

== Geography ==
The district is situated in central Maharashtra, in the north of the Marathwada region—one of eight districts—as part Aurangabad division, and is bounded on the north by Jalgaon district, on the east by Parbhani district and Buldhana district, on the south by Beed district and on the west by Aurangabad district.

The district occupies an area of 7,687 square kilometres (2,968 sq mi). The range of geographical latitudes and longitudes of the district is from 19.01' N to 21.03'N and from 75.04'E to 76.04'E, with gently to moderately sloping topography. The Northern part of the district is occupied by the Ajanta and Satmala hill ranges.

=== Rivers and lakes ===
The Godavari River flows along the southern boundary of the district, from west to east. The Purna River, one of the major tributaries of the Godavari, also flows through the district. The Dudhana, the principal tributary of the Purna, and the Kelana and the Girija, also tributaries of the Purna, as well as the Gulati and the Kundlika—which has been dammed to create the Ghanewadi Reservoir, which provides water to Jalna city—are other rivers draining the district.

== History ==
Buddhism was introduced in Maharashtra during the reign of Ashoka, and the region was under Maurya authority. After the collapse of Maurya authority the region became part of the heartland of the Satavahanas, whose capital was in nearby Prathisthana (now Paithan). The district then fell into the hands of the Chalukyas of Badami in the 6th century. Their rule was replaced by the Rashtrakutas, who ruled the district until the 10th century. Then it was taken by the Western Chalukyas.

In the 12th century, the region became ruled by the Yadava dynasty, who were based in nearby Devagiri and were originally Chalukya feudatories. The Yadavas ruled until 1308, when Khilji general Malik Kafur defeated the Yadavas and annexed their kingdom for Alauddin Khilji. The district remained under Sultanate rule until 1499, when a regional governor declared independence and created the Bahmani Sultanate. In the early 1530s, the Bahmani Sultanate fractured into five states, one of which was the Ahmednagar Sultanate which Jalna was part of. Jalna became conquered by the Mughal Empire and during Akbar's time, was a jagir which was held for a brief time by Abul Fazl. It continued to be part of the Ahmednagar Subah until the Asaf Jahis declared independence, and Jalna became part of their new state of Hyderabad. In 1728, the Marathas conquered the district, but before 1790 the district returned to the hands of the Nizam of Hyderabad.

After India annexed Hyderabad in 1948, it became part of Aurangabad district of Hyderabad State. In 1960, like the rest of Marathwada, Jalna became part of the new state of Maharashtra. On 1 May 1981, the present district was formed from Jalna, Bhokardan, Jafrabad and Ambad talukas of Aurangabad district and Partur taluka of Parbhani district.

== Divisions ==
The district was formed during the term of chief minister Abdul Rehman Antulay. The district is divided into four sub-divisions, Jalna, Partur, Bhokardan and Ambad. These are further divided into eight talukas: Jalna, Ambad, Bhokardan, Badnapur, Ghansavangi, Partur, Mantha and Jafrabad. There is a total of 970 villages in the district.

The district has five constituencies of Maharashtra State Vidhan Sabha ( Legislative Assembly):

- Partur (Vidhan Sabha constituency)
- Ghansawangi (Vidhan Sabha constituency)
- Jalna (Vidhan Sabha constituency)
- Badnapur (Vidhan Sabha constituency)
- Bhokardan (Vidhan Sabha constituency)

While Partur and Ghansawangi are part of Parbhani (Lok Sabha constituency), the other three are part of the Jalna (Lok Sabha constituency).

== Demographics ==
Historical population
Year	Pop.	±% p.a.
1901	356,096	—
1911	427,615	+1.85%
1921	363,765	−1.60%
1931	465,592	+2.50%
1941	521,222	+1.14%
1951	569,324	+0.89%
1961	720,141	+2.38%
1971	893,498	+2.18%
1981	1,026,252	+1.39%
1991	1,359,589	+2.85%
2001	1,607,391	+1.69%
2011	1,959,046	+2.00%

Religions in Jalna district (2011)
Religion	Percent
Hinduism	76.80%
Islam	14.00%
Buddhism	7.79%
Christianity	0.64%
Jainism	0.49%
Other or not stated	0.28%

According to the 2011 census, Jalna district has a population of 1,959,046, roughly equal to the nation of Lesotho or the US state of New Mexico. This gives it a ranking of 237th in India (out of a total of 640). The district has a population density of 255 inhabitants per square kilometre (660/sq mi). Its population growth rate over the decade 2001–2011 was 21.84%. Jalna has a sex ratio of 929 females for every 1000 males, and a literacy rate of 73.61%. 19.27% of the population lives in urban areas. Scheduled Castes and Scheduled Tribes constitute 13.90% and 2.16% of the population respectively.

Languages in Jalna district (2011)
1. Marathi (76.2%)
2. Urdu (9.16%)
3. Hindi (7.09%)
4. Lambadi (4.46%)
5. Others (3.13%)

At the time of the 2011 Census of India, 76.16% of the population in the district spoke Marathi, 9.16% Urdu, 7.09% Hindi and 4.46% Lambadi as their first language.

== Notable people ==
- Badrinarayan Ramulal Barwale – father of the Indian seeds industry, who revolutionised farming practices by producing cheaper and higher-yield seeds in the Marathwada region of India.
- Shantilal Pitti -Founded Jalna’s First steel factory (SRG )in 1970 under the leadership of Former Prime Minister Indira Gandhi.
- Saif Faiz Badruddin Tyabji was a solicitor, mathematician, an educationist passionately devoted to the cause of female education, and a nationalist committed to the idea of India, He was also a Member of Parliament - Jalna for Second Lok Sabha.

== Geographical indication ==
Dagdi Jowar of Jalna was awarded the Geographical Indication (GI) status tag from the Geographical Indications Registry, under the Union Government of India, on 30 March 2024 and is valid until 28 August 2032.

Jai Kisan Shetkari Gat Matrewadi from Badnapur proposed the GI registration of Dagdi Jowar of Jalna. After filing the application in August 2022, the jowar was granted the GI tag in 2024 by the Geographical Indication Registry in Chennai, making the name "Dagdi Jowar of Jalna" exclusive to the jowar crop grown in the region. The GI tag protects the jowar from illegal selling and marketing, and gives it legal protection and a unique identity.

== See also ==
- Tourism in Marathwada
- Institute of Mental Health (Erragadda) - Institute was shifted from Jalna To Hyderabad in 1953 after Hyderabad State (1948–56) was formed.
