= Economy of Aurangabad, Maharashtra =

Himroo Shawl

The city of Chhatrapati Sambhaji Maharaj was a major silk and cotton textile production centre. A fine blend of silk with locally grown cotton was developed as Himroo textile. Much of the silk industry has vanished over time, but some manufacturers have managed to keep the tradition alive. Paithani silk saris are also made in Chhatrapati Sambhaji Maharaj. The name of this cloth is derived from Paithan town.

In 1889 a cotton-spinning and weaving mill was erected in Chhatrapati Sambhaji Maharaj city, which employed 700 people. With the opening of the Hyderabad-Godavari Valley Railways in the year 1900 several ginning factories were started. In the Jalna alone there were 9 cotton-ginning factories and 5 cotton-presses, besides two ginning factories at Chhatrapati Sambhaji Maharaj and Kannad, and one oil- press at Chhatrapati Sambhaji Maharaj. The total number of people employed in the cotton-presses and ginning factories in the year 1901 was 1,016.

Until 1960, Chhatrapati Sambhaji Maharaj languished as a city, remaining industrially backward. In 1960, the region of Marathwada was merged with Maharashtra. The industrial development of the Marathwada region began, propelled through designated backward area benefits.

Growth began when the Maharashtra Industrial Development Corporation (MIDC) began acquiring land and setting up industrial estates. Chhatrapati Sambhaji Maharaj is a now classic example of efforts of a state government towards the balanced industrialisation of the state. Major Industrial areas of Chhatrapati Sambhaji Maharaj are Chikhalthana MIDC, Shendra MIDC and Waluj MIDC.

Many renowned Indian and MNCs have established themselves in the Industrial Estates of Chhatrapati Sambhaji Maharaj:

- Audi India
- Škoda Auto
- Wockhardt
- Videocon
- Siemens
- Bajaj Auto
- Johnson & Johnson
- Colgate-Palmolive
- Kenstar
- Endress+Hauser
- MAN Diesel
- Sterlite Optical Technologies
- Franke
- Greaves Cotton
- Goodyear
- Forbes Gokak Ltd
- Baxter
- Lombardini India
- Intelenet Global Services
- Mahyco / Monsanto

Some of the other well known names are: Garware, Ajanta Pharma, AMRI, Glenmark Pharmaceuticals, Lupin Limited, Wipro, Orchid pharma, Hitachi, Endurance systems, Rucha Eng, Indo German Tool Room, Ceekay Daikin Ltd, Cosmos Films, NRB bearings, Hindalco-Almex Aerospace, Can-pack India, Varroc, Dagerfrost, FrigoriFico Allana, Nath Seeds, Nath Industries (earlier known as Rama Pulp) Team Video.

The Chhatrapati Sambhaji Maharaj - Jalna belt has some of the largest seed companies in India. Mahyco (R&D + Production), Nath Seeds (R&D + Production) Seminis seeds (R&D + Production) and Monsanto (R&D currently) are some of the big names in the industry.

Many firms, in the sectors of automotive and auto components, pharmaceuticals and breweries, consumer durables, plastic processing, aluminium processing, agriculture and biotech, have their manufacturing bases in Chhatrapati Sambhaji Maharaj. Among pharmaceuticals there is Recombinant Insulin Manufacturing plant of Wockhardt (Wockhardt Biotech Park) in Chhatrapati Sambhaji Maharaj, which is Largest Biopharmaceutical plant in India.

Chhatrapati Sambhaji Maharaj has 5 star hotels like ITC Welcomgroup's The Rama International, The Ajanta Ambassador, The Taj Residency, The Lemontree (formerly The President Park) and the Chhatrapati Sambhaji Maharaj Gymkhana.

The Shendra, Chikalthana and Waluj MIDC Industrial Areas are prominent industrial zones on the outskirts of the city, with various major multinational groups having set up manufacturing or processing plants in and around the city. There are five Special Economic Zones (SEZs) which have been approved by central government for this city and these are, in automotive (Bajaj Auto), in pharmaceuticals (Inspira Pharma SEZ and Wockhardt), one in aluminium (Hindalco Aluminium) and yet another is Inspira Renewable Energy SEZ. Recently Chhatrapati Sambhaji Maharaj became the third city in Maharashtra (after Pune & Nashik ) to host an auto cluster namely Marathwada Auto Cluster(MAC). Electrical goods major Siemens has set up a plant for manufacturing of train coaches including superior quality bogies for locomotives, electric multiple units and metro coaches at Shendra MIDC Chhatrapati Sambhaji Maharaj.

Modern Retail Industry has made its presence felt in the forms of Malls. Prozone Mall spread over 1 million square feet is the biggest in the region. The industry is a big employment generator. Prozone alone created direct employment opportunities for 4000 people.

Team Video is a professional Video- Audio post production studio to cater need of mass media in Chhatrapati Sambhaji Maharaj. It is led by Rajendra Joshi, a leading film maker having experience of 30+ years in Mumbai

== Financial services ==
Modern banking in the district may be said to have begun when the Central Bank of India was established in Hyderabad State on 19 February 1932, at Jalna, and in next year i.e., on 20 December 1933, at Aurangabad.

Later on in 1945 the Bank of Hyderabad was established under the Hyderabad State Bank Act of 1350 Fasli. The State Bank of Hyderabad mainly transacted Government business such as accepting and holding of money belonging to the Government and making payments on its behalf and other routine business such as exchange, remittance, etc. The bank also worked as an agent of the Government in its function of issuing paper.

In the first decade of the twenty-first century, Aurangabad has seen a spurt in financial activities, with almost all public sector and private banks have opened up branches including the State Bank of India, State Bank of Hyderabad, Bank of Maharashtra, Citibank India, Deutsche Bank, ICICI Bank, Bank of India, HDFC Bank, etc.

Also Regional Rural Bank viz. Aurangabad Jalna Gramin Bank, was established in 1982. During 2008 Aurangabad Jalna Gramin Bank and Thane Gramin Bank was amalgamated, and new RRB came into existence namely Maharashtra Godavari Gramin Bank. The head office of which is in Aurangabad city. The area of operation is of nine districts viz. Aurangabad, Jalna, Jalgaon, Dhule, Nandurbar, Nasik, Ahmednagar, Thane and Raigad.
