= Mumbai–Nagpur Expressway =

Indian expressway

- Hindu Hrudaysamrat Balasaheb Thackeray Maharashtra Samruddhi Mahamarg
- Mumbai-Nagpur Expressway in red
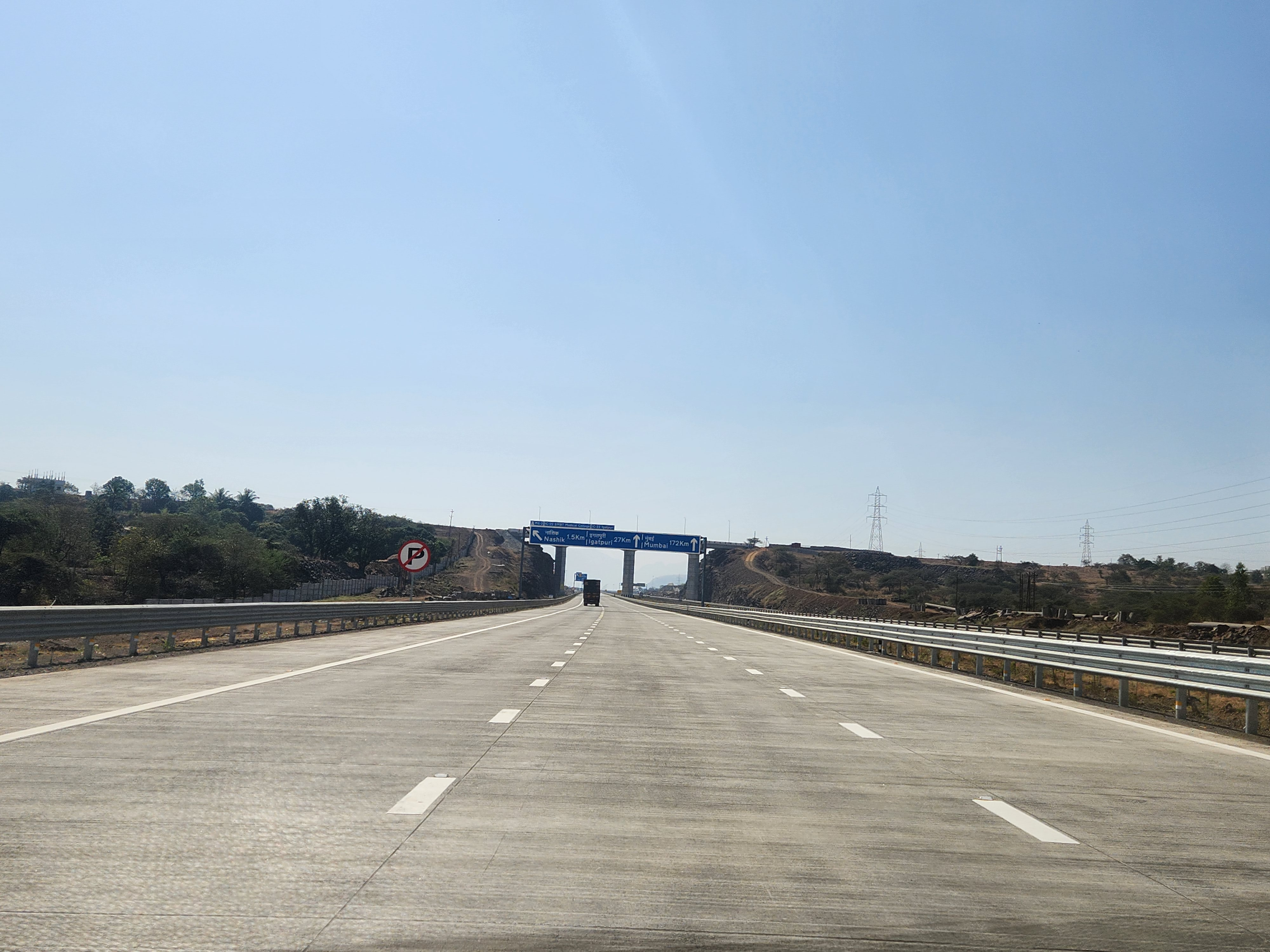
- Section of the expressway in Nashik district

Route information
- Maintained by Maharashtra State Road Development Corporation (MSRDC)
- Length: 701 km (436 mi)
- Status: Completed
- Existed: 11 December 2022 (Phase 1 - Nagpur to Shirdi); 26 May 2023 (Phase 2 - Shirdi to Bharvir Khurd); 4 March 2024 (Phase 3 - Bharvir Khurd to Igatpuri); 5 June 2025 (Phase 4 - Igatpuri to Mumbai MMR)–present

Major junctions
- West end: Amane village, Bhiwandi, Thane district
- List: NH 548A in Shahapur; NH 160 in Igatpuri; NH 160A in Dhamangaon; NH 60 in Sinnar; NH 752G in Kopargaon / Shirdi; NH 752I in Hadas Pimpalgaon; NH 52 / NH 752H in Jambhala; NH 753F in Sawangi; NH 752I / NH 753A in Jalna; NH 548C in Mehkar; NH 161 in Malegaon; NH 161A in Bhur; NH 161E / NH 361C in Karanja Lad; NH 347A in Pulgaon; NH 647 in Wardha; NH 353I in Datala
- East end: NH 353I in Shivmadka village, Nagpur district

Location
- Country: India
- State: Maharashtra
- Districts: Nagpur, Wardha, Amravati, Washim, Buldhana, Jalna, Chhatrapati Sambhaji Nagar, Ahilyanagar, Nashik, Thane
- Major cities: Bhiwandi, Kalyan, Ulhasnagar, Nashik, Shirdi, Chhatrapati Sambhajinagar, Jalna, Wardha , Nagpur and Ahilyanagar

Highway system
- Roads in India; Expressways; National; State; Asian; State Highways in Maharashtra

The Mumbai-Nagpur Expressway, or Samruddhi Mahamarg (officially known as Hindu Hruidaysamrat Balasaheb Thackeray Maharashtra Samruddhi Mahamarg) and Maharashtra Expressway-2 (ME-2), is an existing operational 6-lane wide (expandable to 8), 701-km long access-controlled expressway in the Maharashtra state of India, connecting the Maharashtra's two capital cities, Mumbai in the Marathwada region in the west and Nagpur in the Vidarbha region in the east. By reducing Nagpur-Mumbai travel time from approximately 16 hours to around 8-10 hours , the expressway has boosted the economic development by providing the enhanced connectivity. It is the second expressway in the state of Maharashtra after the Mumbai–Pune Expressway, and the longest within the state.

== History ==
This project was the brainchild of Devendra Fadnavis and was conceptualised by him when he was the chief minister of the state back in 2015. It is being led by the state infrastructure arm Maharashtra State Road Development Corporation (MSRDC), and is designed under the Engineering, Procurement and Construction (EPC) model.

In May 2016, five design consultants were appointed for making Detailed Project Report (DPR) and after Request for Qualification (RfQ) bids opened for civil works in Jan 2017, the land acquisition process started in July 2017. In May 2018, MSRDC opened financial bids submitted by qualified contractors. and road construction started after contract for all 16 packages were awarded by MSRDC to 13 contractors in January 2019. In 2021, work on 7.78 km long Igatpuri tunnel was completed. In December 2022, the Nagpur-Shirdi first phase of the expressway inaugurated and opened by Prime Minister Narendra Modi on 11 December. In May 2023-24, phase-2 Shirdi-Igatpuri was operationalised.

In June 2025, the whole Nagpur-Mumbai main route became operational after being inaugurated by the Prime Minister Narendra Modi.

== Details ==
=== Cost ===
The total project cost, including the land acquisition cost, is around ₹55,000 crore (equivalent to ₹640 billion or US$6.8 billion in 2026). It is among the country's longest greenfield road projects.

=== Design ===
- A single-layer concrete paver has been utilized for the whole 15-metre width of the concrete slabs on either side of the road.
- The expressway will be designed to serve as a runway for airplanes to facilitate fast incident response in war-like situations, emergencies, or natural disasters.
- An Integrated Traffic Management System will be deployed along the expressway to keep tabs on vehicles speeding, lane discipline, or vehicular breakdowns.
- At every 40–50 km of interval on the e-way, wayside amenities like food plazas and rest areas along with electric charging stations for electric vehicles will be made available.
- Extensive landscaping, tunnel lighting, bridge beautification, improved street lighting, and digital signage will be used throughout the length of the expressway.
- Amongst the 32 major bridges that shall be built along the expressway, 5 bridges at Nagpur, Wardha, Nashik, Buldhana, and Thane are proposed to have a theme-based iconic design.
- To ensure digital readiness and resource availability, provisions will be laid down for optical fiber connectivity, natural gas pipelines, and electricity grid along the Mahamarg at industrial townships.
- With electric vehicle charging points proposed at prospecting locations along the expressway and solar plants planned to generate 250MW energy, the Samruddhi Corridor aims to become a model of an energy efficient corridor.
- Maximum locally available material, fly ash and plastic will be used to construct the expressway wherever possible. Rainwater will also be harvested at prospective locations along the expressway to ensure water availability.
- The expressway will connect several tourism circuits offering eco, pilgrim, and heritage tourism, which will include wildlife resorts, tiger safaris, museums, sightseeing destinations, and theme-based retail outlets.
- The expressway is a 6 lane (with paved and unpaved shoulders on both sides) access-controlled super communication expressway comprising a total width of 120 m (90 m in hilly terrain) with a central median of 22.5 m.
- The expressway will be the country's largest 'Greenfield' route alignment, including 65 flyovers/viaducts, 24 interchanges, 6 tunnels, 400+ vehicular, 300+ pedestrian underpasses, and cattle underpasses at strategic locations.

=== Construction ===
To expedite the pre-construction work on the expressway, MSRDC decided to divide the design work into 5 packages and hired a separate consultancy firm to prepare the Detailed Project Report (DPR) for each package, On 31 May 2017, the Government of Maharashtra incorporated 'Nagpur Mumbai Super Communication Expressway Limited', a special purpose vehicle (SPV), to manage the financial requirement for the construction and operation of this project.

The construction work of the 701 km long Mumbai–Nagpur Expressway is divided into 16 packages, with work awarded to 13 different contractors, including Afcons Infrastructure, Larsen & Toubro (L&T), and Reliance Infrastructure.

Sr. No.	Package	Length in km	Contractor
1.	Shivmadka (Nagpur)–Khadki/Amgaon (Wardha)	31.0	Megha Engineering
2.	Khadki/Amgaon (Wardha)–Pimpalgaon (Wardha)	58.4	Afcons Infrastructure
3.	Ashta (Amravati)–Wadhona Ramnath (Amravati)	73.3	NCC Limited
4.	Donad Bk (Washim)–Januna Bk (Washim)	54.3	PNC Infratech
5.	Kinhiraja (Washim)–Kenwad (Washim)	42.8	Apco Infratech
6.	Belgaon (Buldhana)–Parda (Buldhana)	36.1	Apco Infratech
7.	Banda (Buldhana)–Sawargaon Mal (Buldhana)	51.2	Reliance Infrastructure
8.	Navha (Jalna)– xx (Jalna)	42.7	Montecarlo Construction
9.	Bendewadi (Aurangabad)–Fatiyabad (Aurangabad)	54.4	Megha Engineering
10.	Fatiyabad (Aurangabad)–Surala (Aurangabad)	57.9	Larsen & Toubro (L&T)
11.	Dhotre (Ahmednagar)–Derde Korhale (Ahmednagar)	29.3	Gayatri Projects
12.	Pathare (Nashik)–Sonari (Nashik)	45.6	Dilip Buildcon Limited
13.	Sonari (Nashik)–Taranganpada (Nashik)	45.6	BSCPL–GVPR JV (joint venture)
14.	Pimpri Sadroddin (Nashik)–Vashala Bk (Thane)	13.1	Afcons Infrastructure
15.	Vashala Bk (Thane)–Birwadi (Thane)	28.0	Navayuga Engineering Co. (NEC)
16.	Birwadi (Thane)–Amane (Thane)	37.0	Navayuga Engineering Co. (NEC)

As of 31 May 2021, out of the total 1699 structures, including flyovers, viaducts, major and minor bridges, tunnels, interchanges, etc., construction of 1286 structures has already been completed, and the construction of 253 structures is inching towards completion. A total of 6 tunnels will be built along the expressway, and the construction for all of the tunnels is underway in full swing.

=== Features ===
- The project led by MSRDC will observe international road design and safety standards, with an intelligent highway management system for traffic surveillance.
- The expressway is designed for a top speed of 150 km/h on plain terrain and 120 km/h on hilly terrain, even though the legal speed limit remains at 120 km/h for cars and 80 km/h for trucks, enforceable by CCTV cameras, making it the fastest road network in the country, which will cut down the travel time between the two cities to eight hours from the present 16-hour.
- The Super Communication Expressway will considerably contribute to the 6% to the national trunk and freight infrastructure.
- Nearly 36% of the state population will observe the Samruddhi Corridor as a substantial growth driver, putting a direct positive impact on their livelihood.
- The MSRDC has been authorized as a nodal agency, the New Town Development Authority (NTDA), for developing 19 new townships along the route, which will include state-of-the-art healthcare facilities, skill development centers, IT parks, and educational institutions.
- The expressway will pass through 3 wildlife sanctuaries, including a 29.6 km passage through the Katepurna Wildlife Sanctuary in Akola, 29.15 km through the Karanja-Sohol Black Buck Sanctuary in Washim, and 44.975 km through the Tansa Wildlife Sanctuary in Thane.
- The Mumbai–Nagpur Expressway has been envisioned to ensure zero fatalities, and will have CCTVs and free telephone booths at every 5 km interval in case of an emergency.
- Truck terminals in proximity to industrial clusters, machinery and manufacturing units, agro-processing zones, and integrated cold-chain storage facilities will be planned to build the export-ready and quick logistics infrastructure.
- The HHBTMSM Expressway will have a separate provision for the optical fiber connectivity and gas pipelines, turning the greenfield expressway into a 'digital-ready' utility corridor.

=== New township development ===
The Government of Maharashtra has authorized MSRDC to act as the New Town Development Authority to venture into the long-term development of 19 new towns. at strategic nodes, which is also coined as 'Krushi Samruddhi Nagar.' The provisions are enacted under sub-section (1) and section 113 of the MR & TP Act, 1966. The developmental objective to propose these new towns is to encourage the self-employment potential of the regional population through their primitive occupation, i.e., agriculture or agro-related businesses.

Every township developed under the initiative of Krushi Samruddhi Nagar will be built on a land area of approximately 1000-1500 hectares. The new towns shall serve as the utility economic nodes for food processing industry, integrated logistics, and domestic food markets, along with education centers, skill development institutes, healthcare facilities, and commercial and residential housings. The new townships will offer huge industrial land-banks with a focus on dedicated export-oriented infrastructure and integrated logistics to ease the supply chain with enhanced road connectivity for domestic markets.

The Samruddhi Mahamarg connects 15–16 districts directly to Jawaharlal Nehru Port Trust (JNPT), reducing cargo delivery times from six to seven days to under ten hours, supporting Maharashtra's port-led growth strategy.

The 19 new towns will be developed at strategic intersections, at a distance of 30 to 40 km from each other. These towns will be developed in two phases; phase one includes seven townships, while the remaining eleven townships will be developed in phase two. The new towns will encompass essential facilities including schools, Industrial Training Institutes (ITIs), skill development centers, institutes providing technical education and amp, higher education, hospitals, police stations, playgrounds, open spaces, parks, and sports complexes. The new townships will be easily accessible from main roads, feeder roads, national or state highways intersecting the Samruddhi Expressway through the public transport system. The MSRDC adopted land pooling model for land acquisition, wherein 30 percent of the total land acquired under 'Krushi Samruddhi Kendra' program will be returned to landowners. The farmers will also receive compensation of Rs 50,000 per hectare for non-irrigated land and Rs 1 lakh every year for irrigated land for the next 10 years. Based on the suggestions from Wildlife Institute of India (WII), wildlife mitigation measures are planned and necessary structures like cattle underpasses are being built for uninterrupted wildlife movement. Around 320 private communicators were trained and deployed by MSRDC for land acquisition negotiations with prospecting landowners.

== Route alignment ==
The Mumbai–Nagpur Expressway will travel through 10 key districts directly and 14 districts indirectly via feeder roads, 24 talukas, and 392 villages. The 10 main districts are Nagpur, Wardha, Amravati, Washim, Buldhana, Jalna, Aurangabad, Nashik, Ahmednagar, and Thane. The other 14 districts include Chandrapur, Bhandara, Gondia, Gadchiroli, Yavatmal, Akola, Hingoli, Parbhani, Nanded, Beed, Dhule, Jalgaon, Palghar, and Raigad. Yavatmal City is going to connect with Four Lane road to the Samruddhi Expressway and Amravati too. Four Lane Road will be constructed between Yavatmal City and Badnera.

=== Cities and towns ===
Below are the lists of cities/towns through which the Mumbai–Nagpur Expressway will connect:

- Center of Bhiwandi
- North of Kalyan
- North of Ulhasnagar
- South of Shahapur
- South of Igatpuri (Nashik)
- South of Sinnar
- South of Kopargaon
- North of Shirdi
- South of Vaijapur
- North of Aurangabad Caves
- North of Shendra
- North of Jalna
- North of Sindkhed Raja
- North of Mehkar
- North of Malegaon Jahangir
- North of Karanja Lad
- South of Dhamangaon
- North of Pulgaon
- North of Wardha
- South of Seloo
- West of Butibori Power Plant
- South of MIHAN SEZ (Nagpur)

=== Entry/exit points ===
District	Location	Chainage (km)	Name/Code	Notes
Nagpur	Shivmadka/ Nagpur end	0+000	IC/01	(Expressway ends here)
Nagpur	MIDC Buti Bori	6+700	IC/02	
Wardha	Seldoh Wadgaon Bakshi Dry Port	29+060	IC/03	
Wardha	Yelkeli/ Wardha City		IC/04	
Wardha	Virul/(Arvi-Pulgaon)		IC/05	
Amravati	Dhamangaon		IC/06	
Amravati	Shivni/ Yavatmal- Amaravati		IC/07	
Washim	Karanja Lad		IC/08	
Washim	Shelu Bazaar Wanoza	210+500	IC/09	
Washim	Malegaon		IC/10	
Buldhana	Mehkar		IC/11	
Buldhana	Dusarbid		IC/12	
Buldhana	Sindhkhed Raja		IC/13	
Jalna	Nidhona/ Jalna City		IC/14	
Chhatrapati Sambhaji Nagar (Aurangabad)	Shendra MIDC		IC/15	
Chhatrapati Sambhaji Nagar (Aurangabad)	Chhatrapati Sambhaji Nagar (Aurangabad)City		IC/16	Exit for Ajantha
Chhatrapati Sambhaji Nagar (Aurangabad)	Maliwada/ Verul		IC/17	Exit for Ellora
Chhatrapati Sambhaji Nagar (Aurangabad)	Hadas Pimpalgaon/ Lasur		IC/18	
Chhatrapati Sambhaji Nagar (Aurangabad)	Vaijapur		IC/19	
Ahmednagar	Shirdi		IC/20	
Nashik	Sinnar		IC/21	
Nashik	Bharvir Khurd		IC/22	
Nashik	Igatpuri		IC/23	
Thane	Shahapur		IC/24	
Mumbai	Bhiwandi/Amne		IC/25	(Expressway starts here)

=== Spurs ===
- The Igatpuri-Vadhavan Expressway will be developed as a 90 km long spur of the Mumbai–Nagpur Expressway, to connect Igatpuri with Vadhavan Port, which will be among the world's 10 largest ports.

== Inter-connectivity ==
To create a fast logistics gateway for national and international trade, the expressway will connect the country's largest container port, JNPT in Mumbai to Mihan in Nagpur. The expressway will allow access to several industrial and economic corridors through 24 interchanges at strategic locations. It will widely connect the Delhi–Mumbai Industrial Corridor, Bengaluru–Chennai Economic Corridor, Western Dedicated Freight Corridor, Eastern Dedicated Freight Corridor, Chennai–Vizag Economic Corridor, and Golden Quadrilateral. Apart from JNPT, other seaports including Kandla MBPT, Mormugao, New Mangalore, Kochi, Chennai, Visakhapatnam and Ennore will also have indirect connectivity.

The Samruddhi Mahamarg connects 15–16 districts directly to Jawaharlal Nehru Port Trust (JNPT), reducing cargo delivery times from six to seven days to under ten hours, supporting Maharashtra's port-led growth strategy.

The following will either connect or act as an alternative to the Mumbai–Nagpur Expressway:

- Nagpur–Vijayawada Expressway is part of the Nagpur-Vijayawada Economic Corridor, which will connect Nagpur-Chandrapur (part greenfield) to Mancherial-Warangal (greenfield), Warangal-Khammam (greenfield), Khammam-Vijayawada (part greenfield). The tenders were issued in November 2022, and are likely to be completed by late 2024 or mid 2025. In Feb 2026 Feb, Maharashtra government approved Rs2,353cr to acquire land for Nagpur-Chandrapur section of this expressway.
- Raipur–Visakhapatnam Expressway will be an alternative to the Nagpur-Vijayawada Expressway for access to various ports across the Eastern Ghats in the Bay of Bengal.
- The Jalna-Nanded Expressway will also provide direct connectivity between the Vijayawada–Hyderabad Expressway (at Hyderabad) and the Mumbai–Nagpur Expressway (at Jalna).
- The Hyderabad–Indore Expressway through Akola via Nanded–Akola–Omkareshwar–Indore, which and will further connect to the Delhi–Mumbai Expressway via the Kota–Indore Expressway (136 km).

== Present status ==
=== Main route: Nagpur-Mumbai ===
- 2025 Jun: Whole route became operational.

=== Spur - Igatpuri-Vadhavan ===
- 2025 Nov: 90 km Igatpuri-Vadhavan spur is planned.

=== Interchange - Bhagur (at Nashik) Interchange ===
- 2026 Sep: A new interchange near Borkhind in Sinnar taluka of Nashik district, with a new 9.3 km feeder road is planned.

== See also ==
- Mumbai–Pune Expressway
- Delhi–Mumbai Expressway
- Jalna-Nanded Expressway
- Expressways of India
- Nagpur–Goa Expressway
- NHAI
- Expressways of India
