= Sterlite Technologies =

Indian multinational technology company

Sterlite Technologies Limited
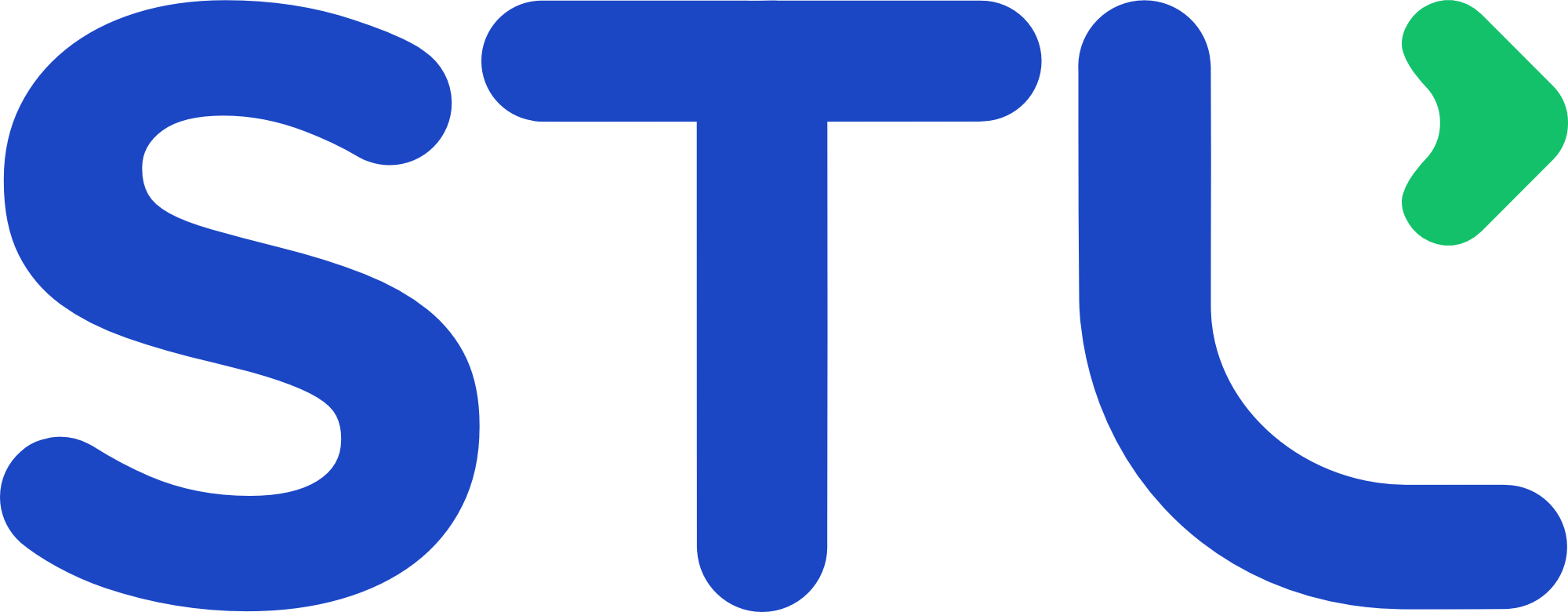

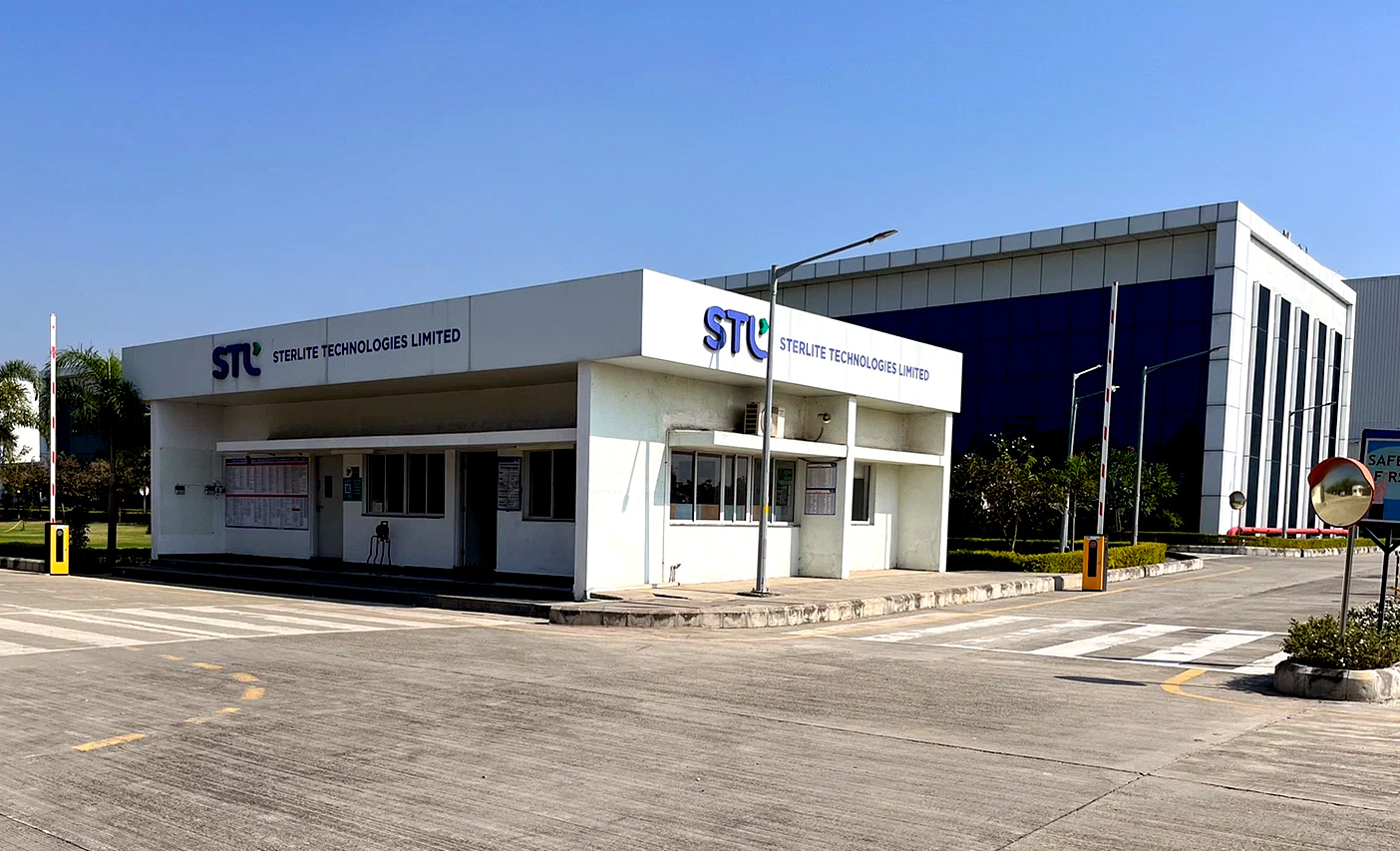
- Sterlite Technologies' plant at Waluj MIDC
- Trade name: STL
- Type: Public
- Traded as: BSE: 532374; NSE: STLTECH
- ISIN: INE089C01029
- Industry: Telecommunications; Technology; Datacenters; Virtualized Networks; Network equipment
- Founded: 1988; 38 years ago
- Founder: Anil Agarwal
- Headquarters: Pune, Maharashtra, India
- Area served: Worldwide
- Key people: Anil Agarwal; Pravin Agarwal; Ankit Agarwal (Managing Director); Rahul Puri; Naveen Bolalingappa; Ajay Jhanjhari (Group Chief Financial Officer); Rohit Goyal (Global Marketing Head); Anshu Mordia (CHRO); Badri Gomatham (Group Chief Technology Officer); Venakatesh Murthy (Director, Operations); Jimi Barker, Business Head - Data Centre and Optical Connectivity; Amir Sekhavat, Business Head - Copper; Binod Balachandran COO - Optical Interconnectivity & DC Terminated Solutions
- Products: Optical fiber; Fiber-optic cables; Structured data cables; Network services; Network software
- Services: Optical fibre infrastructure, passive infrastructure, access networks, metro, FTTH, wi-fi, IBS, optics & MPLS core network, enterprise services, fixed broadband, telecom software
- Revenue: ▲₹47,450 million (US$490 million)
- Operating income: ▲₹5,662 million (US$59 million)
- Parent: Vedanta Limited
- Subsidiaries: ClearCom
- Rating: CRISIL AA/Watch Long-term; ICRA A1+/Reaffirmed Short-term

Sterlite Technologies Limited (formerly Sterlite Tech) is an Indian optical and digital technology company, headquartered in Pune. It is listed on Bombay Stock Exchange and National Stock Exchange of India. It has 780+ patents and is active in over 150 countries. The company is specialized in optical networking which consists of optical fiber and cables, hyper-scale network design, and deployment and network software, company deliver solutions in more than 100 countries. Data Centre & Cloud companies, Telecom operators, Internet service providers and Large enterprises collaborate with STL to build their future-ready digital infrastructure. STL's business goals are driven by customer-centricity, R&D and sustainability.

== History ==
The company was founded as Sterlite Telecom Systems in March 2000, primarily engaged in the production of telecommunication cables. By August 2000, the company's name was changed to Sterlite Optical Technologies.

During the fiscal year 2005–2006, the company raised its installed capacity for Fiber Optic Cables from 1.4 million FKM to 2.4 million FKM. Additionally, in the same year, the company initiated a new project to manufacture Broadband Access Networks.

Between 2006 and 2007, the company expanded its installed capacity for Copper Telecom Cables by 2 million CKM to reach a total of 9.5 million CKM. Similarly, the capacity for Fiber Optic Cables was raised by 822,528 FKM to reach 3,222,528 FKM, and the capacity for Broadband Access Networks was increased by 120,000 to reach 720,000.

In 2007, the name of the company again changed to Sterlite Technologies.

== Operations ==
As of 2023, the company operates manufacturing facilities in 6 different locations, including Aurangabad and Pune in Maharashtra, Silvassa in Dadra & Nagar Haveli, and Haridwar in Uttarakhand. It has the first optical fiber cable plant in India to receive zero waste to landfill certification

The Aurangabad plants, located in Waluj MIDC and Shendra MIDC, primarily specialize in the production of single mode optical fibers that transmit signals at 1490 nm wavelength in compliance with internet communication standards.

As of 2020, STL invested in 5G assembling ecosystem as a part of Make in India initiative.

The company reported a year-on-year increase of 870% in Q1 profit to ₹197 crore, supported in part by higher earnings associated with AI data centre orders.

The company raised ₹1,500 crore through a Qualified Institutions Placement to support its growth plans and strengthen its balance sheet.

=== Geographical presence ===
Along with these manufacturing sites, STL has 2 development centres and 20+ sales and marketing offices across the world as of March 31, 2018, with major presence in Australia, Brazil, China, Europe (Italy), the Middle East and the United States.

As of 2026, the company operates manufacturing facilities in 10 different locations, including Aurangabad in Maharashtra, Silvassa in Dadra & Nagar Haveli in India, South Carolina in the US, Haimen in China, Brescia and Origgio in Italy.

== Research and development ==
STL researches, conceptualizes, and manufactures telecommunications and specialized optical fibers. As per the Cellular Operators Association of India, it is the sole domestic firm that has cable production standards on par with the global level through substantial investments in research and development, as well as intellectual property advancements.

In 2019, the company partnered with the Department of Electrical Engineering, Indian Institute of Technology, Madras by signing a memorandum of understanding (MoU) to support a 5G network research professorship. Since 2020, the professor in this position has been teaching and researching on 5G technology by combining IIT-M's research and domain knowledge with STL's industry expertise.

=== Publications ===
==== Case studies ====
- Sinha, Abhishek; Ramdas, Rajani; Pradeep, K.V. (2022). "Sterlite Technologies Ltd.: To Buy or Not to Buy is the Question". Asian Case Research Journal. 26 (2). Singapore: Asian Case Research Journal, World Scientific: 127–144. doi:10.1142/S0218927522500055.
- Sahay, Arvind; Tiwari, Tara (2023). Sterlite Technologies Limited (STL): From Cables to Solution Selling. London: Sage Knowledge. ISBN 9781529620108.

== Environmental, social, and governance ==
=== Carbon footprint ===
In March 2023, STL declared its adoption of the Science Based Targets initiative (SBTi) to enhance the transparency and specificity of its carbon monitoring, control, and disclosure. Regarding its carbon footprint, the company reported a total of 237,035 tCO2 emissions in the fiscal year 2022, encompassing Scope 1, 2, and 3 emissions.

=== Wastewater management ===
In 2022, STL implemented the zero liquid discharge framework at its six manufacturing plants in Aurangabad and Silvassa, Maharashtra. The company recycled over 145,000 cubic meters of wastewater in the same fiscal year as part of this initiative. The process includes sewage treatment, industrial wastewater treatment, and multi-effective evaporator (MEE) plants. These operations are digitally monitored through SCADA dashboards.

== Mergers and acquisitions ==
- On 24 September 2015, Sterlite Technologies Limited acquired Elitecore Technologies in an all cash deal worth ₹180 crore.
- On 20 July 2018, Sterlite Technologies Limited subsidiary Sterlite Global Venture acquired Metallurgica Bresciana in an all cash deal worth €47 million.
- On 26 September 2019, Sterlite Technologies Limited subsidiary Sterlite Global Venture acquired Impact Data Solutions (IDS) Group for an enterprise value of $15 million.
- On 9 January 2020, Sterlite Technologies Limited acquired 12.8% stake in Israel-based ASOCS.
- On 2 November 2020, Sterlite Technologies Limited acquired 100% stake in Optotec S.p.A, a leading optical interconnect company at an enterprise value of €29 million.
- In June 2021, STL acquired a UK-based network integration company, Clearcomm for £15.5 million.

== Philanthropy ==
=== Jeewan Jyoti Women Empowerment Programme (JJWEP) ===
In 2014, STL established the Jeewan Jyoti Women Empowerment Programme (JJWEP), to bring about gender equality, create decent work opportunities, economic growth, and thus, alleviation of poverty in several villages

=== Medical Mobile Unit (MMU) ===
STL initiated MMU programme in partnership with Indian red cross society across 24 remote villages

=== STL Garv ===
In 2020, STL Garv launched BharatNet-based platform to deliver telemedicine, e-tutoring, government-to-citizen, and assisted e-commerce services in rural India.

== Awards and recognitions ==
- In 2019, STL is awarded at The Economic Times CIO annual conclave
- 2022, Pandit Deendayal Upadhyaya Telecom Skill Excellence Awards at Department of Telecommunications' International Quantum Communication Conclave.

== Controversies ==
In 2002, Sterlite Technologies Limited was the subject of a major lawsuit, by Fitel USA, a subsidiary of Furukawa Electric charging Sterlite Technologies Limited with infringement of a number of optical fiber patents including those related to manufacturing fiber with low polarization mode dispersion. This lawsuit was settled in Jan 2010.

In 2024, a district court of Columbia, South Carolina ruled that Sterlite Technologies unjustly benefited from acquiring Prysmian Group's trade secrets and awarded $96.5 million in damages against the company.

Company decisively wins Patent Dispute in Europe, reaffirms commitment to defending its Innovation and Intellectual Property.
