= Aurangabad Industrial City =

East Aurangabad (Industrial City) AURIC
- Industrial city
- East Aurangabad

- Location within Maharashtra
- Country: India
- State: Maharashtra
- Founded: 7 September 2019
- Named after: Emperor Aurangzeb via Aurangabad
- Sectors: 15 sectors: Sector 1; Sector 2; Sector 3; Sector 4; Sector 5; Sector 6; Sector 7; Sector 8; Sector 9; Sector 10; Sector 11; Sector 12; Sector 13; Sector 14; Sector 15

Area
  - Total: 4,000 ha (10,000 acres)
- Website: www.auric.city

The Aurangabad Industrial City (abbrev. AURIC or Auric) is a greenfield industrial smart city spread over an area of 10,000 acres (40 km^{2}) near Aurangabad, Maharashtra, India. It is a part of the Delhi–Mumbai Industrial Corridor Project (DMIC), which plans to develop an industrial zone spanning across six states between India's capital, Delhi and its financial hub, Mumbai.

The Government of Maharashtra decided to develop the Shendra and Bidkin neighborhoods of Aurangabad as a planned industrial township under DMIC. Equipped with an underground plug and play infrastructure, 60% of the land in AURIC is for industrial usage, mainly focusing on textile, food, defence, engineering and electronics, while the remaining 40% is intended for residential, commercial and other purposes.

On 7 September 2019, the Aurangabad Industrial City was inaugurated as the first industrial integrated smart city of India under the Government of India's flagship Smart Cities Mission.

== Geography ==
AURIC has a total area of 10,000 acres (40 km^{2}) spread across the Shendra and Bidkin areas near Aurangabad. The Shendra node is 2,000 acres (8.1 km^{2}) and the Bidkin node is 8,000 acres (32 km^{2}). 60% of land in Auric is zoned for industrial use, while the remaining 40% is zoned for residential and commercial use, as well as public spaces, and social and cultural amenities.

=== Shendra ===
MIDC in the 1990s established the third industrial estate in the city by acquiring 902 hectares of land at Shendra village. Shendra Industrial area is a 5-star industrial estate. Shendra has located 17 km from Aurangabad on Jalna road towards the east of the city. It is 8.0 km from Aurangabad airport. The Aurangabad railway station is 19.0 km away. The Shendra Industrial Area is just a 15 mins. drive from the city.

=== Bidkin ===
Bidkin is a large village in Paithan Taluka of Aurangabad district. Bidkin village is situated about 24 km from Aurangabad city on Aurangabad - Paithan Highway towards its south. It is located at a distance of 27 km from its Taluka headquarter town of Paithan. According to 2001 census, the population of the village was 14941.

== Industrial Park ==
As part of the DMIC, the Government of Maharashtra has decided to develop the Shendra and Bidkin belt in Aurangabad as planned industrial townships to act as major investment node. The industrial park is being developed from Shendra on the east, up to Bidkin on the south of Aurangabad city.
The Industrial park is to come upon 8400 hectares of land i.e. 20756 acres. Renowned US firm, AECOM, has been roped in as a consultant for planning the township. The state has also decided to rope in a Japanese consortium to recommend the use of technology for infrastructure upgrades in these areas. Based on the investment potential of an area, the state has plans to develop the Aurangabad belt as an automobile and engineering hub. An Exhibition and Convention Center is being developed at Sendra.
Recently the Government of India has announced a New National Manufacturing Policy. Under this policy, seven National Investment and Manufacturing Zones (NIMZ) are proposed to be set up. It aims, setting up of mega industrial towns on waste and infertile land acquired by the government. The Industrial Park would be one of them.

== Administration ==
AURIC is managed by the Maharashtra Industrial Township Limited (formerly Aurangabad Industrial Township Ltd), a special purpose vehicle and joint venture between the Maharashtra Industrial Development Corporation (MIDC) and the National Industrial Corridor Development Corporation (formerly Delhi-Mumbai Industrial Corridor Development Corporation). The city's administrative building is the seven-storey Auric Hall located in Shendra. The building also houses banks and other offices. Auric Hall is powered entirely by solar energy provided by 2.5 MW solar panels installed on the building.

== See also ==
- Amritsar Delhi Kolkata Industrial Corridor
