= Economy of the Rashtrakuta empire of Manyakheta =

The Rashtrakuta dynasty came to power in South India in 753 C.E. and ruled for over two centuries. At its peak the Rashtrakutas of Manyakheta ruled a vast empire stretching from the Ganges River and Yamuna River doab in the north to Cape Comorin in the south, in a time of political expansion, architectural achievements and famous literary contributions.

The Rashtrakuta economy derived its funding from its natural and agricultural produce, its manufacturing revenues and moneys gained from its conquests. Cotton was the chief crop of the regions of southern Gujarat, Khandesh and Berar while cotton yarn and cloth was exported from Bharoch and incense and perfumes from the ports of Thana and Saimur. Minnagar, Gujarat, Ujjain, Paithan and Tagara were important centres of textile industry. White calicos were manufactured in Burhanpur and Berar and exported to Persia, Turkey, Poland, Arabia and Cairo. Jawarit Bajri was grown in some regions of modern Maharashtra and oil seeds in dry areas of northern Karnataka region. The Konkan region, ruled by the feudatory Silharas, produced large quantities of betel leaves, coconut and rice while the lush forests of Mysore, ruled by the feudatory Gangas, produced such woods as sandal, timber, teak and ebony. The Rashtrakuta empire controlled most of the western sea board of the subcontinent which facilitated its maritime trade.

The deccan soil, though not as fertile as that of the Gangetic plains, was rich in minerals. The copper mines of Cudappah, Bellary, Chanda, Buldhana, Narsingpur, Ahmadnagar, Bijapur and Dharwar were a source of income and played an important role in the economy. Diamonds were mined in Cudappah, Bellary, Kurnool and Golconda; the capital Manyakheta and Devagiri were important diamond and jewellery trading centres. Muslin cloth were manufactured in Paithan and Warangal and the leather industry and tanning flourished in Gujarat. Some regions of northern Maharashtra and Mysore, with its vast elephant herds, were important for the ivory industry. The Gujarat branch of the empire earned a significant income from the port of Bharoch, one of the most prominent ports in the world at that time. Other important ports were Naosari, Sopara, Thana, Saimur, Dabhol, Jayagad, Kharepatan and Kalyan. The empire's chief exports were cotton yarn, cotton cloth, muslins, hides, mats, indigo, incense, perfumes, betel nuts, coconuts, sandal, teak, timber, sesame oil and ivory. Its major imports were pearls, gold, dates from Arabia, slaves, Italian wines, tin, lead, topaz, storax, sweet clover, flint glass, antimony, gold and silver coins, singing boys and girls (for the entertainment of the royalty) from other lands. Trading in horses was an important and profitable business, monopolised the Arabs and some local merchants.

== Practicalities ==
Oxen and bullock carts were used for business and leisure travel within the kingdom. While superior quality horses served the purpose for army cavalry, inferior horses were used as pack animals for moving commodities, especially in the hilly regions where cattle driven carts were too slow. Buying and selling land was not just the business of the two concerned parties but needed the consent of village elders and Mahajans (Brahmins). Artists and craftsman operated as corporations rather than as individual business. Inscriptions mention guilds of weavers, oilmen, artisans, basket and mat makers and fruit sellers. A Saundatti inscription refers to an assemblage of all the people of a district headed by the guilds of the region. The weaver guild of Lakshmeshwar (in Gadag) had one executive head and the Mulgund guild had four executives with a membership of about two thousand artisans. The largest guilds were the Vira Balanju guilds of Belgamve (Balligavi) with nine heads and the Miraj inscription mentions another with nineteen executives. The number of executives depended directly on the membership in the guild. The Belgamve guild had five hundred inscriptions (Shasana) written outlining the rules and regulations by which all members had to adhere. Some guilds were considered superior to others, just as some corporations were, and received royal charters determining their powers and privileges. The Dambal inscription mentions its guild as the "lord of Aihole" and that its members owned their own royal umbrellas. Inscriptions suggest these guilds had their own militia to protect goods in transit and, like village assemblies, they operated banks that lent money to traders and businesses.

== Taxation ==
Information on the kingdom's revenue system is now available from its copper plate grants, contemporaneous writings and inscriptions from neighbouring kingdoms. The accounts of Muslim writers of the time also provide insight into details. The government's income came from five principal sources: regular taxes, occasional taxes, fines, income taxes and tributes from feudatories. Regular taxes were called Ujranga, Uparikara, Sidddhaya and Visthi. There were some miscellaneous taxes as well. Occasional taxes were called chcitabhata pravesadavala and Rajasevakanam vasatidan. An emergency tax was also imposed occasionally. Income tax included taxes on crown land, wasteland, specific types of trees considered valuable to economy, mines, salt, treasures unearthed by prospectors, and estates and moneys of persons who died without an heir.

Ujranga and Uparikara were universal produce taxes applied to items such as betel leaves, fruits, vegetables, flowers and grass. This may have included some additional taxes to pay for the salaries of government officials. The land owner or tenant paid a variety of taxes, including land taxes, produce taxes and payment of overheads for maintenance of the Gavunda. The theory that Udranga was applied to permanent landowners and uparikara to temporary land tenants has been proposed. Land taxes were varied, based on type of land, its produce and situation. A Banavasi inscription of 941 mentions reassessment of land tax due to the drying up of an old irrigation canal in the region. Various tax levels were determined ranging from 8% to 16%. The king determined the tax levels based on need and circumstances in the kingdom while ensuring that an undue burden was not placed on the peasants. A portion of all taxes earned by the government (usually 15%) was returned to the villages for maintenance. There is no mention of taxes on water, roads and other local facilities. The Rashtrakuta empire was frequently at war with the Palas and Gurjaras, a political situation that required significant expenditure to upgrade and maintain the army. The land tax therefore may have been as high as 20%.

Taxes on lands and property gifted to war heroes were lightly taxed while other lands were taxed in three installments. This type of taxation was called Balagachchu. The Ukkal inscription records that when land owners defaulted on taxes for three years in a row under normal circumstances, the lands were seized and sold by the village community. In most of the kingdom, land taxes were paid in goods and services and rarely was cash accepted. This was true in the domains of the feudatory Gangas and Cholas as well. From inscriptions it is known that government owned granaries and storehouses which ensured that grain and corn of the best quality was available at market rates, while old or low quality material was auctioned off at bargain prices or destroyed. A tax called Bhutapattapratyaya was levied on imported items called upatta while locally produced items were called bhuta and manufactured and stored items were called sambhrta. In addition, there were general excise and local taxes levied on villages. Taxes were levied on daily household items such as clarified butter and charcoal. Among non-agricultural rural people, herdsman and cattle breeders had to pay taxes also.

The Rashtrakuta government levied a shipping tax of one golden Gadyana on all foreign vessels embarking to any other ports and a fee of one silver Ctharna on vessels travelling locally. Taxes were levied on all types of artisans such as potters, sheep herders, weavers, oilmen, shopkeepers, stall owners, brewers and gardeners. Taxes on perishable items such as fish, meat, honey, medicine, fruits and essentials like fuel was as high as 16%. Under miscellaneous taxes were ferry and house taxes, only the Brahmins and their temple institutions being subjected at a lower rate. Some forms of taxation was occasional or uncommon, levied on villages only during encampment of the army or the police (Bhafas) on a march. Under such circumstances, the army (Chata) was allowed limited access to the village or township and that was only under special circumstances which ensured daily life in the communities continued unhindered. Customary presents were give to the king or royal officers on such festive occasions of as marriage or the birth of a son.

Emergency taxes are described in the writings of Somadeva and were applied under extraordinary circumstances when even Brahmins and temples were not excluded. These were applicable when the kingdom was under duress, facing natural calamities, or preparing for war or overcoming its ravages. Fines were charged on socially or politically alienated villages, the term used being Sadandadas aparadhah or Pratishisiddhaya. Since these taxes were uncommon, income to state from these sources was small overall. Income on government property included taxes on stray plots of cultivable land, forests, forest produce, waste lands, lands awaiting cultivation and specific trees such as sandal, Hirda, mango and Madhuka, even when these were found growing on private property. The kingdom did not lay claim to the entire land inside its territory. A record of the feudatory Vaidumba king from southern Deccan says the king had to purchase three veils of land from a local assembly in order to assign it to a temple in a village. Taxes on salt and minerals were mandatory, although the empire did not claim sole ownership of mines, implying that private mineral prospecting and the quarrying business may have been active. The term used for these taxes was Sahadhyantara Siddhi. Treasures, even when discovered on private land, were included as taxable earnings as were the incomes and properties of persons who died without heirs. If there were no survivors in the family, the state claimed all the properties.
