= Jalna Dry Port =

Dry port in Maharashtra, India

- Interactive map of Jalna Dry Port
- Location within India Location within Maharashtra

Location
- Location: Jalna, Maharashtra, India
- Coordinates: 19°50′59.3″N 75°48′47.1″E

Details
- Built: 2024
- Operated by: Container Corporation of India
- Size: 500 Acre

Jalna dry port is a Dry port (inland port) located near Jalna, Maharashtra, India. It has been developed by Jawaharlal Nehru Port Trust (JNPT). The facility was inaugurated on 12 March 2024 by Prime Minister Narendra Modi. It will be operated and maintained by CONCOR National Highways Logistics Management Limited (NHLML) and JNPT have signed a memorandum of understanding (MoU) for the development of Multi-Modal Logistics Park (MMLP) at Jalna Dry Port in Maharashtra.

The dry port is expected to operate as one of the largest major container ports of India with an upcoming container handling capacity of almost 10 million Twenty-foot Equivalent Unit (TEU). As announced earlier, JNPT envisaged the need to establish extended logistic facilities in the hinterland to facilitate the overall operations at the port.future. Geographically strategic locations of Jalna and Aurangabad for Jalna dry port along with Delhi - Mumbai Industrial Corridor Project and Mumbai–Nagpur Expressway Samrudhhi Mahamarg would make these cities "growth engines" of Maharashtra in the future.

== History ==
In 2014, Union Transport Minister Nitin Gadkari revealed that the government was looking to set up Marathwada's first dry port on 500 acres of land between Aurangabad and Jalna. The Port was to be developed on private-public partnership basis. JNPT appointed Ernst & Young as consultants to prepare a detailed project report (DPR) for the project in 2015. 185 hectares of land had been acquired at the cost of Rs. 88 Crores. In June 2018, during the then Chief Minister Devendra Fadnavis' trip to the UAE to attract investments to Maharashtra, Dubai-based DP World agreed to invest in logistics parks in Nagpur and develop logistics hubs along the transport corridor from JNPT to the interiors by nursing dry ports of Wardha, Jalna, Nashik and Sangli. Fadnavis had mentioned that the government’s sanction for a dry port at Jalna district would enable expeditious movement of goods to JNPT.
