= Kali Masjid, Jalna =

Mosque in Jalna, Maharashtra, India

Kali Masjid
- Location of the mosque in Maharashtra

Religion
- Affiliation: Islam
- Ecclesiastical or organizational status: Friday mosque
- Status: Active

Location
- Location: Old City, Jalna, Maharashtra
- Country: India
- Interactive map of Kali Masjid
- Coordinates: 19°50′25″N 75°52′35″E

Architecture
- Type: Mosque architecture
- Style: Deccan architecture
- Founder: Syed Farooque, Ahmadnagar Sultanate
- Completed: 1578 CE

Specifications
- Capacity: 700 worshippers
- Length: 40 m (130 ft)
- Width: 27 m (89 ft)
- Dome: One
- Minaret: Four
- Minaret height: 20 m (66 ft)
- Inscriptions: One (maybe more)
- Materials: Red sandstone; black stone

The Kali Masjid, also known as the Jumma Masjid, is a Friday mosque, located in the Old City of Jalna, in the Jalna district of the state of Maharashtra, India. The 16th-century mosque is known for its unique architectural features with black stones and rich cultural heritage, and is a tourist attraction for the region.

== History ==
The mosque was constructed by the reigning Nizam Shahi dynasty in 1578 CE. It is located in the middle of the old section of the city, Old Jalna, and is known as the "black mosque", because it is constructed out of black stone. The stone used for the construction of the mosque and a large pond for water was needed, for this there was a stone-filled complex ground on the west side of the mosque, where Moti Talab was constructed and the stones of that area were cut and carved.

Over time, the mosque has been renovated, and its historical significance conserved. Its well-preserved entrance door bears the date of construction in Persian, showcasing the craftsmanship of the era.

== Architecture ==
The Kali Masjid is located inside a rectangular walled compound, closed on three sides with an arcade in the front. The entrance is through a large stone gate, flanked by stone jali screens, painted white. The prayer hall is topped by corner finials with fluted domical tops. Octagonal columns carry six small domes within. The mosque's principal dome, is ornamented at the top and the base with carved stone lotus leaves. The adjacent hammam, constructed five years later, has domed chambers on faceted pendentives. The sarai, directly opposite the mosque, is a large square paved court, surrounded by arcaded chambers/recesses. In this mosque with three arches, three arches have been made from each side, the four walls of the mosque are made of stones only. Designs have been made under the four small minarets like the petals of a wonderful flower. And in the middle a big gummaz is made in white colour. Right in the middle of the mosque, there is a big quadrangular tank, in which water used to come from the underground pipe system from Moti Talab. Five graves are unknown graves in the northeast of the mosque. There are Arabic inscriptions on the walls inside the mosque.

The mosque has capacity for 700 worshippers at any one time.

== See also ==
- Islam in India
- 2004 Jalna Mosque bomb attack
- List of mosques in India
