= Jalna-Nanded Expressway =

Expressway

Jalna-Nanded Samruddhi Mahamarg
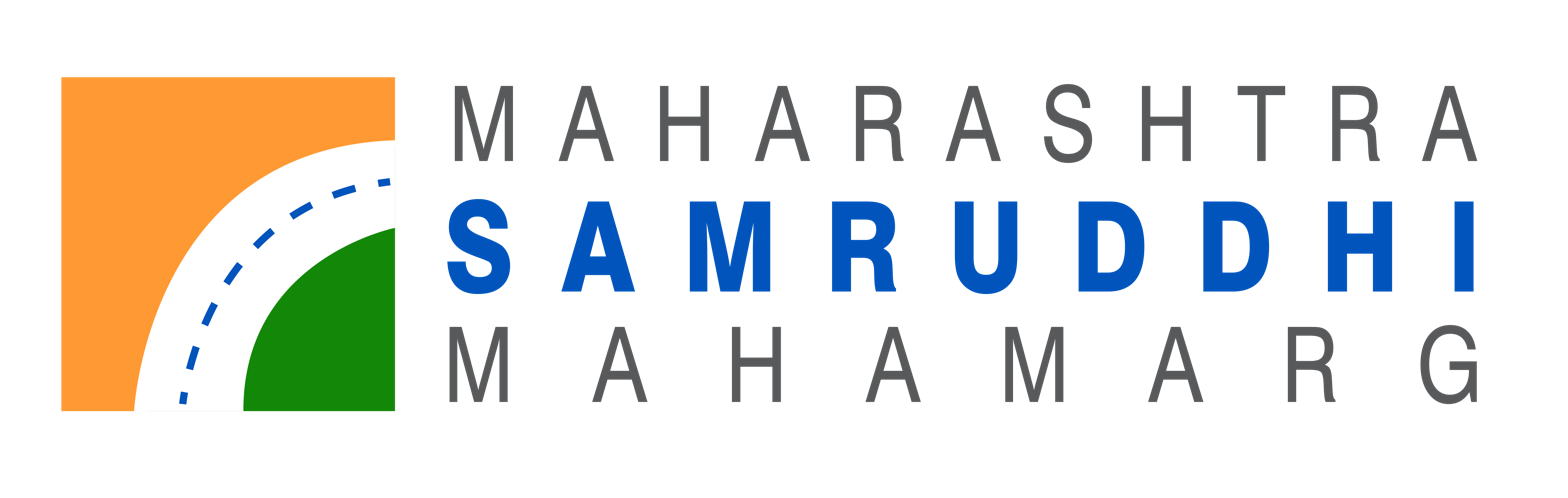

Route information
- Maintained by Maharashtra State Road Development Corporation (MSRDC)
- Length: 179 km (111 mi)
- Existed: Dec 2024 (expected)–present

Major junctions
- Northwest end: Jalna district
- Southeast end: Nanded district

Location
- Country: India
- States: Maharashtra
- Major cities: Jalna, Parbhani Nanded

Highway system
- Roads in India; Expressways; National; State; Asian

The Jalna-Nanded Expressway is a greenfield spur expressway that connects the largest cities of Marathwada (Jalna, Parbhani, and Nanded) to Mumbai-Nagpur Expressway, which is also officially known as Hindu Hrudaysamrat Balasaheb Thackeray Maharashtra Samruddhi Mahamarg. Proposed as 6-lane wide, this segment will reduce the road distance between Jalna and Nanded from 226 kilometres to 179 kilometres and bring down travel time between Nanded and Mumbai from 12 hours to around 6 hours.

== Route Alignment ==
The Jalna-Nanded Expressway will travel through Jalna, Parbhani, and Nanded districts directly. The 179-kilometre Jalna-Nanded segment passes through 87 villages. Around 93.52 kilometres of this segment passes through four tehsils in Parbhani, while 66.46 kilometres passes through three tehsils of Jalna and 19.82 kilometres passes through one tehsil in Nanded.

=== Cities & Towns ===
Below are the lists of cities/towns through which the Jalna-Nanded Expressway will connect:

- North East of Jalna (Panshendra Village) connects to Mumbai-Nagpur Expressway
- North of Partur
- South of Mantha
- North of Selu
- North of Parbhani
- South of Purna
- South of Nanded (Kakandi Village)

== Construction ==
MSRDC invited RFQ applications for the expressway’s civil construction in April 2023. Here’s a list of civil packages included within the RFQ document:

Sr. No.	Package	Length in km	Contractor
1.	JNE-1 (36.09 km): 0.000 to 36.09	36.09	APCO Infratech is lowest bidder
2.	JNE-2 (30.46 km): 36.09 to 66.55	30.46	APCO Infratech is lowest bidder
3.	JNE-3 (32.44 km): 66.55 to 98.99	32.44	Montecarlo (MCL) is lowest bidder
4.	JNE-4 (28.85 km): 98.99 to 127.84	28.85	PNC Infratech is lowest bidder
5.	JNE-5 (32.19 km): 127.84 to 160.03	32.19	Montecarlo (MCL) is lowest bidder
6.	JNE-6 (19.82+4.48 km): 160.03 to 179.85 (package includes from Hingole Gate to Chatrapai Chowk)	24.3	Roadway Solutions (RSIIL) is lowest bidder

== Status updates ==
- March 2021: Project Announcement at Maharashtra State Annual Budget 2021–22.
- November 2021: Maharashtra State Rajpatra (Work Order) Release.
- December 2021: Land Acquisition Process Start.
- February 2022: 77% Land Acquisition Survey Completed.
- November 2022: Land Acquisition Notification Release.
- November 2022: 22000 Crore Rupees Fund Raising For Land Acquisition & Construction Work.
- April 2023: Invited Request for Qualifications (RFQ) to select eligible contractors for the construction.
- October 2024: Maharashtra Cabinet has approved the construction of expressway.

== See also ==
- Delhi–Mumbai Expressway
- Expressways in India
- Maharashtra State Road Development Corporation
- Mumbai–Nagpur Expressway
- NHAI
