= Jayakwadi Bird Sanctuary =

- IUCN category IV (habitat/species management area)
- Interactive map of Jayakwadi Bird Sanctuary
- Location: Shambhajinagar district, Maharashtra

Jayakwadi Bird Sanctuary is a bird sanctuary. It is located near Jayakwadi village in Paithan taluka of Sambhajinagar district in Maharashtra State, India. The sanctuary is located in 30 islands of various sizes in the shallow waters, with trees for roosting; this provides an ideal shelter for migratory birds.

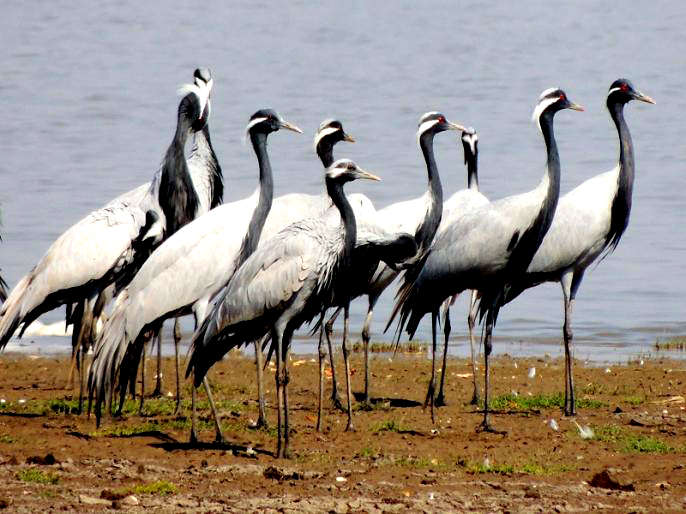
Demoiselle crane at sanctuary

Having completed the construction of dam in 1976, The supply of water started collecting here as well as it is major project to be established as bird sanctuary announced in 1986. There are more than 50 species of fishes found in the sanctuary which attract migratory birds coming from foreign regions. More than 300 species of birds are perched at place. The birds such as Flamingo, Spoonbill, Painted stork, Night heron, White stork, Wagtail, Pin-tailed snipe, Northern shoveler, Sandpiper, Red-naped ibis, Little grebe migrate or roost here for specific time.

Many species are reported in numbers larger than 1% of their bio-geographic population thresholds in Jayakwadi bird sanctuary. However, the dam's high water levels have resulted in a loss of habitats for the birds, with an environmentalist noting in 2019 that it could happen that migratory birds from our country and abroad may prefer other water bodies than the bird sanctuary.

There is environment change causing droughts due to the lack of rain in the upper regions affecting sanctuary thus result in loss of birds numbers. Many major project are still required to avoid this environment pandemic for future relief.
