= Jalna Fort =

17th-century fort in Maharashtra, India

- Location within Maharashtra
- Interactive map of Jalna Fort
- 19.8433°N 75.8919°E
- Location: Near Kundalika River Jalna, Maharashtra

History
- Built: 1725
- Built for: Asaf Jah I

Site notes
- Area: 2 acres (0.81 ha)
- Architect(s): Kabil Khan, Others
- Architectural style: Nizam Style
- Governing body: Government of Maharashtra
- Owner: Nizam King Asaf Jah I

Jalna Fort, also known as Mastgad, Mastgarh, is a historic fort located on the eastern side of the town of Jalna, Maharashtra, India. It was built in 1725 by Kabil Khan, under the orders of Nizam ul Mulk Asaf Jah I, the founder of the Asaf Jahi dynasty in Hyderabad Princely State, an independent successor state to the Mughal Empire. The fort, along with the citadel, occupies a prominent position in the town. For a few years, the fort was used by the Jalna Municipal Corporation. Now the corporation's office has shifted to a new place near Zila Parishad School.

== The Fort ==
Jalna Fort, despite being in a state of partial collapse, still holds cultural and religious significance in the region. The presence of a mosque and the shrine of a Sufi saint within the fort further adds to its historical and religious importance. The fort was used as the office of Jalna City Municipal Corporation for several years, showcasing its importance in the administration of the region.

== History ==
The fort was constructed during the reign of Nizam-ul-Mulk, Asaf Jah I, who was the Governor of the Deccan under the Mughal Empire from 1713 to 1721. In 1724, Asaf Jah I resumed rule from the Mughal provincial capital of Aurangabad, under the title of Asaf Jah granted by Mughal Emperor Aurangzeb. The state was ruled from 1724 to 1857 by the Nizam of Hyderabad, who were initially viceroys of the Mughal Empire in the Deccan.

Princely State of Hyderabad from 1724 to 1857
