= 2004 Jalna Mosque bomb attack =

Terrorist attack in India

- Jalna (India)
- Location: 19.848°N 75.889°E; Jalna, Maharashtra, India
- Date: 27 August 2004; 1.45 PM (+8 GMT)
- Target: Praying Muslim civilians
- Attack type: Bombing
- Deaths: 0
- Injuries: 18

The 2004 Jalna Mosque bomb attack involved two separate crude bomb explosions at local mosques in Jalna, Maharashtra on 27 August 2004. According to senior police officers, the first blast occurred at Kadriya Masjid in Jalna at 1:45 pm, and the second explosion happened just 15 minutes later at another mosque on the outskirts of Poorna town in Parbhani district. The attacks took place during Friday prayers and resulted in 18 people being injured. On 18 July 2012, all seven accused were acquitted by a district and sessions court due to lack of evidence.

== Trial and Accused ==
Prime accused Rakesh Dhawade and his five accomplices were produced before Judge K Y Tenge.

According to the prosecution, Dhawade, who hails from Pune, and his accomplices - Yogendra Deshpande, Gururaj Jayra Tutewar, Rahul Manohar Pande, Sanjay, Maroti Wagh, and Vittalrao Chowdhari - all residents of Nanded, on 27 August 2004, allegedly hurled a crude bomb in Qadariya Masjid during Friday prayer. Twelve persons were injured in the blast.

On the first day of the hearing, the court recorded the statements of four witnesses.

Dhawade and others are also accused in the Nanded, Parbhani, and Malegaon blast cases.
