= Jan-ul-lah Shah Muhammad =

Sufi saint from Jalna

Jan-ul-lah Shah Muhammad Hazrat Janullah Shah Baba
- Miya Sahab

Personal life
- Died: Jalna, Maharashtra
- Resting place: Miya Sahab Dargah, Jalna, Aurangabad, Mughal Empire. Currently Jalna, Maharashtra. 19.8379°N 75.9018°E
- Home town: Punjab
- Known for: Spreading Islam in Deccan
- Other name: Sayyid Jan Muhammad Sufi

Religious life
- Religion: Islam

Jan Muhammad of Jalna (or Sayyid Jan Muhammad Sufi, Jan Muhammad Darwesh) was a Sufi saint in the city of Jalna (in modern Maharashtra state).

In 1679 the Maratha leader Shivaji ransacked Jalna for three days, and being aware that Shivaji generally left alone sites of any religion, many of the wealthy of the town took refuge in the saint's dargah in the suburbs of the city. However, on this occasion Shivaji looted the hermitage despite past precedent. When Shivaji died in 1680, only five months after his coronation, Muslims attributed his death to a curse from Jan Muhammad for having threatened the Sufi for giving shelter to the townsfolk and their wealth.
