= Kadwa Dam =

- Location within Maharashtra
- Official name: Kadwa Dam D03010
- Location: Bharvir Khurd, Igatpuri
- Coordinates: 19.7555159°N 73.7938359°E
- Opening date: 1997
- Owners: Government of Maharashtra, India

Dam and spillways
- Type of dam: Earthfill
- Impounds: Kadwa river
- Height: 31.84 m (104.5 ft)
- Length: 1,660 m (5,450 ft)
- Dam volume: 1,245 km^{3} (299 cu mi)

Reservoir
- Total capacity: 52,910 km^{3} (12,690 cu mi)
- Surface area: 6,705 km^{2} (2,589 sq mi)

Kadwa Dam, is an earthfill dam on Kadwa river near Igatpuri, Nashik district in state of Maharashtra in India.

== Specifications ==
The height of the dam above lowest foundation is 31.84 m (104.5 ft) while the length is 1,660 m (5,450 ft). The volume content is 1,245 km^{3} (299 cu mi) and gross storage capacity is 59,590.00 km^{3} (14,296.40 cu mi).

== Purpose ==
- Irrigation

== See also ==
- Dams in Maharashtra
- List of reservoirs and dams in India
