= Bharvir Khurd =

Village in Maharashtra

- Village
- Location in Maharashtra, India
- Coordinates: 19.7555159°N 73.7938359°E
- Country: India
- State: Maharashtra
- District: Nashik
- Taluka: Igatpuri
- Named for: Bhairavanth

Government
  - Type: Grampanchayat
  - Body: Bharvir Khurd Grampanchayat

Languages
  - Official: Marathi
- Time zone: UTC+5:30 (IST)
- PIN: 422403
- Vehicle registration: MH-15

Bharvir Khurd is a village of Igatpuri Taluka in Nashik District in the Indian state of Maharashtra. It is located near the Kadwa Reservoir. It is one of the interchange between Mumbai-Nagpur Expressway connecting with National Highway 160A.
