= Intelenet Global Services =

Teleperformance subsidiary company (founded 2000)

- Type: Private
- Founded: 11 October 2000
- Founders: Tata Consultancy Services (TCS) and Housing Development Finance Corporation (HDFC)
- Headquarters: Mindspace, Malad West, Mumbai, India
- Number of locations: 70
- Key people: Bhupendra (Chief Executive Officer)
- Services: Business Process Outsourcing (BPO) Services
- Revenue: Rs. 28.10 billion ($420 million) (FY 2014-)
- Owner: Teleperformance
- Number of employees: 66,000
- Website: www.intelenetglobal.com

Intelenet Global Services is an Indian business process outsourcing (BPO) company founded in 2000. It was acquired by Teleperformance in 2018.

Its operations included customer support, transaction processing, finance and accounting and human resources services.

== Timeline ==
Intelenet Global Services was created in October 2000. It began operations in November 2001, as a 50:50 joint venture (JV) between Tata Consultancy Services and Housing Development Finance Corporation LTD. (HDFC).

In July 2004, TCS divested its 50% stake, which was purchased by Barclays Bank PLC, one of Intelenet's biggest clients. By 2006, Intelenet had over 5,000 employees and more than 20 client relationships.

In 2006, Intelenet entered the Indian domestic BPO industry with its acquisition of Sparsh BPO Services from Spanco Telesystems. The company operates in the domestic BPO market, with over 18,000 employees in 10 locations across India.

In 2007, Intelenet's management team initiated a management buyout backed by Blackstone Group, a global private equity firm. Blackstone Group owns 75.98% of the stake at Intelenet; 19% is held by SKM (Employee) Trust, and 5.02% by Housing Development Finance Corporation Ltd (HDFC).

Also in 2007, Intelenet acquired two companies in the travel and IT industries. The first was Upstream, a US-based BPO company with centers in Fargo, North Dakota; Chesapeake, Virginia; and Campbellsville, Kentucky. The second was Travelport ISO, the Indian branch of the Travelport group.

In January 2010, Intelenet opened a delivery centre in Kraków, Poland.

In 2014, Intelenet Global Services was acquired by Serco Group PLC. In 2016, Serco (Indian operations) was acquired back by Intelenet Global Services.

In 2018, Intelenet Global Services was acquired by France-based BPO, Teleperformance.
