= Asian Case Research Journal =

- Discipline: Business
- Language: English
- Edited by: Lau Geok Theng

Publication details
- History: 1997–present
- Publisher: World Scientific (Singapore)

Standard abbreviations
- ISO 4: Asian Case Res. J.

Indexing
- ISSN: 0218-9275 (print); 1793-6772 (web)

Links
- Journal homepage

The Asian Case Research Journal provides a compilation of original cases on Asian companies and MNCs operating in Asia-Pacific. The journal was founded in 1997. Cases in the journal are decisional or illustrative, covering a wide range of business disciplines, from Marketing to Management Information Systems.

== Abstracting and indexing ==
The journal is abstracted and indexed in:

- CSA Risk Abstracts
- Social Sciences Citation Index
- Social Scisearch
- Journal Citation Reports/Social Sciences Edition
