= National Highway 647 (India) =

National Highway in India

National Highway 647
- Map of National Highway 647 in red

Route information
- Auxiliary route of NH 47
- Length: 53.7 km (33.4 mi)

Major junctions
- West end: Arvi
- East end: Wardha

Location
- Country: India
- States: Maharashtra

Highway system
- Roads in India; Expressways; National; State; Asian
← NH 347A	→ NH 361

National Highway 647, commonly referred to as NH 647 is a national highway in India. It is a secondary route of primary National Highway 47. NH-647 runs in the state of Maharashtra in India.

== Route ==
NH647 connects Arvi, Pimpalkuta, Kanrangna, Anji, Pavnar and Wardha in the state of Maharashtra.

== Junctions ==
NH 347 Terminal near Arvi.
NH 361 near Lonikand

== See also ==
- List of national highways in India
- List of national highways in India by state
