= Bidkin =

City in Maharashtra, India

- City in Maharashtra
- Location in Maharashtra, India Bidkin (India)
- Coordinates: 19.706193°N 75.300121°E
- Country: India
- State: Maharashtra
- District: Chhatrapati Sambhaji Nagar District, Maharashtra

Government
  - Body: Gram panchayat

Population (2012)
  - Total: 19,596

Languages
  - Official: Marathi
- Time zone: UTC+5:30 (IST)
- PIN: 431105
- Telephone code: 02431
- ISO 3166 code: IN-MH
- Website: maharashtra.gov.in

Bidkin is a city in Paithan Taluka of Aurangabad district in the Indian state of Maharashtra.

== History of Bidkin ==
Bidkin was founded by Sufi saint Nizamuddin who came to Aurangabad in the 8th century Hijri, (14th century CE). Burhanuddin Gharib gave him a " turra" or crest for his turban, and the title of " Saidus Sadat" or " chief of chiefs." for Paithan.On his way he founded the village of Bidkin. The patelship of the village of Bidkin was for a long time in the hands of Saiads, whose tombs are scattered over the kasba and pet, and are objects of veneration to the inhabitants. Nizamuddin belonged to Chishtiyya order of Sufi saints of Aurangabad.

== About Bidkin ==
Bidkin small city is situated about 20 km from Aurangabad City on Aurangabad - Paithan Highway. It is located at a distance of 27 km from its Taluka headquarter town of Paithan.

According to 2012 census the population of the village was 19596 of which 10051 were males and 9545 were females.
In 2001 the population of the village was 14941 of which 7703 were males and 7238 were females.
It has a bank (Bank of Maharashtra), a police station and a post office. Recently population of the village has grown manifold due to setting up of industries in the region.

== DMIC Industrial Park ==
Recently Govt of Maharashtra has decided to include Bidkin village in DMIC corridor by setting up Shendra - Bidkin Mega Industrial Park, acquisition of 10,000 hectors of farm land is in progress. An Exhibition and Convention Centre at Sendra is being developed.
