= Shendra MIDC =

Industrial area in Maharashtra, India

Coordinates: 19°52′36.62″N 75°29′27.63″E

After 1960, Maharashtra Industrial Development Corporation (MIDC) began acquiring land and setting up industrial estates. Land was acquired near Shendra village on Aurangabad - Jalna highway in the 1990s.

As part of its efforts, the MIDC developed the Waluj and Chikalthana Industrial Areas, which were soon snapped up. This success along with additional demand for infrastructure necessitated the development of a third industrial area in the city - Shendra Industrial Area. Total notified area is 902 hectares.

== Location ==
Shendra is located 17 km from Aurangabad. It is 8.0 km from Aurangabad airport. The Aurangabad railway station is 19.0 km away, and the Chikalthana Industrial Area lies at a distance of 11 km from Shendra.

== Clients ==
Industries which has made Shendra their home includes Audi India, Škoda Auto, Volkswagen, Wockhardt, EtchON, Perkins Engines, Monginis.

Electrical goods major Siemens has set up a plant for manufacturing of bogies for locomotives, electric multiple units and metro coaches at Shendra MIDC Aurangabad.

== DMIC Industrial Park ==
Recently Govt of Maharashtra has decided to acquire land from Shendra to Bidkin village under DMIC corridor for setting up of Shendra - Bidkin Mega Industrial Park. Acquisition of 10,000 hectares of farm land is in progress. An Exhibition and Convention Centre at Sendra is being developed.
