= Amane, Bhiwandi =

Village in Maharashtra

Amane
- village
- Location in Maharashtra, India Amane (India)
- Coordinates: 19.3162262°N 73.1615127°E
- Country: India
- State: Maharashtra
- District: Thane
- Taluka: Bhiwandi
- Elevation: 21 m (69 ft)

Population (2011)
  - Total: 2,683
- Time zone: UTC+5:30 (IST)
- 2011 census code: 552629

Amane is a village in the Thane district of Maharashtra, India. It is located in the Bhiwandi taluka.

== Demographics ==
According to the 2011 census of India, Amane has 520 households. The effective literacy rate (i.e. the literacy rate of population excluding children aged 6 and below) is 79.52%.

Demographics (2011 Census)
	Total	Male	Female
Population	2683	1371	1312
Children aged below 6 years	344	178	166
Scheduled caste	46	17	29
Scheduled tribe	44	20	24
Literates	1860	1064	796
Workers (all)	878	746	132
Main workers (total)	631	557	74
Main workers: Cultivators	198	180	18
Main workers: Agricultural labourers	51	39	12
Main workers: Household industry workers	12	8	4
Main workers: Other	370	330	40
Marginal workers (total)	247	189	58
Marginal workers: Cultivators	85	72	13
Marginal workers: Agricultural labourers	46	8	38
Marginal workers: Household industry workers	4	2	2
Marginal workers: Others	112	107	5
Non-workers	1805	625	1180
