= Dhamanagaon =

Village in Maharashtra

- village
- Location in Maharashtra, India Dhamanagaon (India)
- Coordinates: 20.0774442°N 72.8456399°E
- Country: India
- State: Maharashtra
- District: Palghar
- Taluka: Dahanu
- Elevation: 72 m (236 ft)

Population (2011)
  - Total: 3,905
- Time zone: UTC+5:30 (IST)
- ISO 3166 code: IN-MH
- 2011 census code: 551618

Dhamanagaon is a village in the Palghar district of Maharashtra, India. It is located in the Dahanu taluka.

== Demographics ==
According to the 2011 census of India, Dhamanagaon has 672 households. The effective literacy rate (i.e. the literacy rate of population excluding children aged 6 and below) is 46.51%.

Demographics (2011 Census)
	Total	Male	Female
Population	3905	1942	1963
Children aged below 6 years	710	359	351
Scheduled caste	1	1	0
Scheduled tribe	3887	1934	1953
Literates	1486	945	541
Workers (all)	1769	917	852
Main workers (total)	1061	801	260
Main workers: Cultivators	313	279	34
Main workers: Agricultural labourers	314	206	108
Main workers: Household industry workers	2	2	0
Main workers: Other	432	314	118
Marginal workers (total)	708	116	592
Marginal workers: Cultivators	270	31	239
Marginal workers: Agricultural labourers	370	47	323
Marginal workers: Household industry workers	0	0	0
Marginal workers: Others	68	38	30
Non-workers	2136	1025	1111
