= Nagewadi =

Village in Maharashtra, India

- Village
- Location in Maharashtra, India Nagewadi (India)
- Coordinates: 17°21′01″N 74°31′12″E
- Country: India
- State: Maharashtra
- District: Sangli
- Taluk: Khanapur
- Elevation: 673 m (2,208 ft)

Population (2011)
  - Total: 3,957

Languages
  - Official: Marathi
- Time zone: UTC+5:30 (IST)
- PIN: 415311
- STD code: 02346
- Vehicle registration: MH-10

Nagewadi is a small village in Khanapur taluk of Sangli district (Maharashtra). In the year 2011, it had a population of 3,957.

== Geography ==
Nagewadi is located near the northern edge of Sangli district, at an average elevation of 673 meters above the sea level. It has a total land area of 1287 hectares.

== Demographics ==
As per the 2011 census of India, the village had a population of 3,957. The literacy rate was 71.82%, lower than the state average of 82.34%.
