= Paithan =

Paithan Pratishthana
- Town
- Paithan
- Location within Maharashtra Location within India
- Coordinates: 19.48°N 75.38°E
- Country: India
- State: Maharashtra
- Region: Marathwada
- District: Chhatrapati Sambhajinagar
- Established: 1st century BCE

Government
  - Type: Nagarpalika election result 2016 All 23 seats result Mayor - BJP, Shivsena - 7, Nationalist Congress party - 6, BJP - 5, Congress - 4, Other- 1.
  - MLA: Vilas Sandipanrao Bhumre (SHS) (2024)
  - Mayor: Suraj Rajendra Lolge (BJP) (2016)
- Elevation: 458 m (1,503 ft)

Population
  - Total: 57,280
- Time zone: UTC+5:30 (IST)
- PIN: 431 107
- Telephone code: 02431
- Vehicle registration: MH-20

Paithan (['pəɪ.ʈʰəɳ]), historically Pratiṣṭhāna [pɾə'tɪʂʈʰanə], is a town with municipal council in Chhatrapati Sambhajinagar district, Maharashtra, Maharashtra, India. Paithan is located 56 kilometres (35 mi) south of present-day Aurangabad on the banks of the Godavari River. It was the capital of the Satavahana dynasty, which ruled from the second century BCE to the second century CE. It is one of the few inland towns mentioned in the famous first-century Greek book, the Periplus of the Erythraean Sea, where it appears in the genitive plural form, Παιθάνων.

Paithan is associated with many spiritual leaders of all faiths since ages. To name some of them are - Changdev Maharaj, Saint Dnyaneshwar, Saint Sopandev, Saint Nivruttinath, Saint Muktabai, Saint Eknath, Saint Jaganade Maharaj, Saint Bhanudas, etc. Paithan was the home town and Samadhi sthal of the great Marathi saint Eknath; people flock yearly to his shrine during the time of the Paithan yatra, also known as the Nath Shashti. Apegaon village, the birthplace of Saint Dnyaneshwar and his three other siblings is located along the northern bank of the River Godavari, about 12 kilometers easterly to Paithan. The religious saints and philosophers enthralled the masses through their works written in simple Marathi style and popularized the bhakti movement in the wake of Islamic expansion. Therefore, Paithan eminently deserves the appellation as "Santpura". Paithan is also an important place for followers of Mahanubhava Sampradaya. Sarvajna Chakradhar Swami stayed in Paithan for a long period.

Paithan is a well known ancient Digambar Jain atishay kshetra (pilgrimage place of miracles). A beautiful black sand idol of 20th Jain Tirthankar, Bhagwan Munisuvratnath is in the temple.

Paithan is also known for its saris — the Paithani silk saris that sport, intricately embroidered gold or silver borders.

Dnyaneshwar Udyan at Paithan is developed on the lines of Brindavan Gardens, Mysore.

The city is home to many noted personalities of modern times like Shankarrao Chavan, Yogiraj maharaj Gosavi (Descendant of Sant Eknath), Balasaheb Patil (Historian)

== History ==
Pratishthana (Sanskrit: प्रतिष्ठान, lit. standing firmly) was capital of first Satavahana king Simuka, from where it grew into an empire covering almost half of present India. The Satavahanas were known as "Trisamudratoyapitvahana". Later, under the name Pishtapura (Sanskrit: पिष्टपुर, lit. flour city), it was taken by the Chalukya ruler Pulakesin II who commissioned the recording of the event in a poem as "reducing Pishtapuram to flour".

Pratishthanapura or present day Paithan is said to be the capital of Mulaka desh. Aurangabad, Nashik, Jalna, Washim are parts of Mulaka. Muluka or Mulaka is identified and it is also known as Moolaka or Moolaka desha along with Ashmaka.

According to Puranas, Pratishthana was built by King Sudyumna, son of Manu. Once Sudyumna, who was one of the few sons of Manu, strayed into Shiva's forest during his hunting trip around Manulaya and was cursed to become a woman named Ila by Shiva. By praying to Shiva's consort Parvati, Sudyumna managed to stay as man and woman alternatively every month. He would not remember events of one stage in the other. When he was a woman, he married the son of Chandra, Budha (Mercury, one of the nine planets the 'Navagrahas'), through whom he had a son (Pururavas). Budha helped Ila to attain his former self by pleasing Shiva through 'Ashvamedha Yagna' (Horse sacrifice). After leaving Budha, at the instance of Sage Vasiştha, Ila established Somavamsa in the city of Pratishthana in the valley of Sahya mountains by banks of river Godavari from where he ruled for long. After him, Pururavas became the king of Pratishthana.

In ancient times it was called Pratishthanpura and it has seen many ups and downs in its long and chequered history. Because of its long and continued existence it was the seat of a number of dynasties and dynastic rules. It was credited to be the capital of the ancient Janpadas like Asmaka. Thus, Paithan gained the epithet as "Supratisthana" (Sanskrit: सुप्रतिष्ठान, lit. standing very firmly) not only for its political importance as the capital city during the long rule of the Satavahanas and of great consequence till the Yadavas, but also for its affluence and of highly advanced civilization. Its importance has also been vouchsafed in the writings of the foreign travelers and geographers. As a great commercial centre, it was very well linked with the other important towns of ancient India and the western world. Its exports had earned great reputation in the western markets and had achieved international renown. Its quality textiles such as the Paithani had no parallel in the contemporary world. The Roman parliament was rather forced to put a ban on such types of luxurious imports to save the nation form extravagance. So its contributions in the field of trade and commerce are equally noteworthy and as important as in the fields of politics and religion.

Archaeologically, Paithan's importance need not be overemphasised. The environs of Paithan have given evidence of pre-historic and proto-historic antiquities. Whereas, in the historical period archaeological data from the Satavahans to the Yadavas has been recorded. Even now a number of antiquities of different periods are available on the surface of the mounds at Paithan. Thus we come across a variety of beads, terracotta. Bangles and coins of the Satavahana period. Some of the punch-marked coins predate the Satavahans and the foreign coins confirm its close contacts with the western world. Paithan, with its varied and variegated politico-economic and religio-social activities contributed to the growth of a enriched cultural milieu and perhaps no other city in Maharashtra could possibly compare itself with Paithan. Apart from the thriving of the three major religious sects such as Buddhism, Jainism and Vedic religion at Paithan ever since it became the capital city of the Satavahanas, all the religious movements during the medieval period have centered round this historic city.

Paithan the ancient city of Pratishthan, is situated on the left bank of the river Godavari. Since the second millennium B.C. The dawn of the Goda Valley Civilisation it has played a vital role in shaping the culture of the region and has been a sacred place for the Hindus, the Buddhists and the Jains. From ancient times Paithan was important emporium of trade and commerce with links connecting it to marts in India and in Europe. It developed its own religion and educational institutions and in the field of art, drew the attention of the Muslim invaders, who overran the city and whose culture left its imprint upon the life and manners of the people of Paithan. During the seventeenth century, the Marathas, recognizing the value of Paithan as a centre of religious and economic importance, strove hard to keep it under control. They felt a special affinity towards this ancient city and many Maratha rulers made it a point to stop at Paithan while on their way to other places. In 1679, for instance, Chhatrapati Shivaji halted at Paithan while proceeding to Jalna. During his stay he issued a charter appointing Kawale – a leading priest of Paithan – as a royal priest. This arrangement made by Shivaji for a local priest to perform the family rituals is understandable as Paithan was regarded as moksha-tirtha – a pilgrimage centre from where the soul could be liberated forever from a shackled existence. Shivajis son and successors honoured this charter for a long time. The Peshwas, the administrators of the Maratha rulers, also kept close connections with Paithan city. Peshwa Balaji Bajirao in 1761, married into the Wakhare family – moneylender of Paithan and his successors . Peshwas Madhavrao and Narayanrao, maintained the close association. Peshwa Madhavrao, judging from his letters, was particularly impressed by the textiles of Paithan.

== Geography ==
Paithan is located at 19.48°N 75.38°E. It has an average elevation of 458 m (1,503 ft).

== Demographics ==
As of 2001 India census, Paithan had a population of 34,556. Males constitute 51% of the population and females 49%. Paithan has an average literacy rate of 67%, higher than the national average of 59.5%: male literacy is 75%, and female literacy is 60%. In Paithan, 14% of the population is under 6 years of age.

Bidkin is a large village in Paithan Taluka having a population of 14941 according to 2001 census.

=== Religion in Paithan City ===
Religion in Paithan city (2011)
1. Hinduism (90.0%)
2. Islam (2.40%)
3. Buddhism (2.45%)
4. Jainism (0.72%)
5. Christianity (0.22%)
6. Sikhism (0.01%)
7. Others (0.22%)

=== Religion in Paithan Taluka ===
Religion in Paithan Taluka (2011)
1. Hinduism 54.8 (51.1%)
2. Islam 48 (44.8%)
3. Buddhism 3.6 (3.36%)
4. Jainism 0.43 (0.40%)
5. Christianity 0.15 (0.14%)
6. Sikhism 0.02 (0.02%)
7. Others 0.19 (0.18%)

== Transport ==
- Nearest Railway Station : Chhatrapati Sambhajinagar Railway Station 50 km (31 mi)
- Nearest Airport : Aurangabad 53 km (33 mi)

Available bus routes

- Chhatrapati Sambhajinagar - Paithan
- Ahilyanagar - Shevgaon - Paithan
- Beed - Gevrai - Paithan
- Jalna-Ambad-Pachod- Paithan
- Paithan - Ahilyanagar - Pune
- Paithan - Nanded
- Paithan - Jalgaon
- Paithan - Bhusaval
- Paithan - Mumbai
- Paithan - Borivali

== Education ==
- Pratishthan Mahavidyalay, Paithan
- Shri Nath Junior College, Paithan
- Shri Nath High School, Paithan
- Shalivahan Vidyalay, Paithan
- Zilha Parishad Boys High School, Paithan
- Zilha Parishad Girls High School, Paithan
- Zilha Parishad School(s), Paithan
- Maulana Azad Urdu Primary School, Paithan

== Tourist attractions ==
- Sant Eknath Samadhi Mandir
- Sant Eknath Maharaj House
- Naag Ghat and Palthi Nagari (Santa jñānēśvara mahārājānī rēyamumamukhī vēda vaḍavilā tē ṭhāyakana)
- Dashkriya Vidhi Ghat,Paithan
- Nath Sagar Jayakwadi Dam
- Sant Dnyaneshwar Garden
- Dr.Balasaheb Patil Archaeological Museum, At Sant Dnyaneshwar Garden
- Bird Sanctuary: home for migratory birds from Siberia
- Geeta Mandir near Sant Dynaneshwar Udyaan
- Sant Jagnade Maharaj Mandir, Teli Dharmashala
- 12 Jyotirlinga Temples in Paithan
- Shri 1008 Munisuvratnath Digamber Jain Atishaya Kshetra
- Tirth Khamb
- Maulana Sahab dargah
- Maratha Kranti Bhawan, the first of kranti bhawans in Maharashtra by Maratha community is coming up in Katpur area, five kilometers north of Paithan
- Aapegaon, 12km easterly to Paithan, on the northern bank of the Godavari river : The Birth Place Of Sant Dnyaneshwar Maharaj (Mauli) and his three siblings
- Mungi, 15km south-easterly to Paithan, on the Southern bank of the Godavari river (in Ahmednagar district) : The Birth place of Nimbarkacharya ji Maharaj(Nimbarka Peeth)

=== Paithan Jain Tirth ===
Paithan is a well known ancient Digambar Jain atishay kshetra, meaning a pilgrimage place of miracles. This temple is dedicated to Munisuvrata, the 20th Jain tirthanakar. The moolnayak of this temple is a black colored sand idol of Bhagwan Munisuvrat Nath. The idol is of the time period when stone idols were not generally made, thus indicating its antiquity. It is even believed that Lord Rama, Lakshman and Sita of Treta Yuga worshiped this idol. This Jain tirtha and the idol are considered as powerful hence qualifying as an atishay kshetra.

=== Saint Jaganade Maharaj Temple ===
Shri Santaji Jagnade (1624–1688) was one of fourteen cymbal players employed by Shri Tukaram Maharaja, a prominent Marathi Saint. Jagnade recorded several of Tukaram's Abhangs. He belonged to the Teli caste of oil producers[3] and is the only Saint from that caste. Jagnade was born and brought up in Sadumbare in the Maval tehsil in the Pune District. He was a Varkari, a vaishnav devotee of Lord Vitthal, who is supreme Lord Krishna Himself appearing as the King of Dwaraka. The address of his temple in Paithan is Shree Santaji Maharaj Tilven Teli Samaj Dharmshala, which is located close to Dashkriya Vidhi Paithan ghat, little easterly to Eknath Maharaj Mandir. The founders of this temple are Mr. Pralhadseth Sidlambe, Mr.Tulshidas Bhanudas Kharge and Mr. Kedarnath Dadarao Sarje.

=== Jayakwadi Dam ===
A major Embankment dam called the "Jayakwadi Dam" is located near Paithan, and is known for attracting a wide variety of resident and migratory birds which has been established as Jayakwadi Bird Sanctuary. This is the world's first dam made from soil. It has 27 gates. On 9 August 2006, Paithan experienced its worst flood in known history when the dam floodgates were opened because of heavy rainfall in the region, half of city was drawn in the water due to which many people migrated to othe places for few days. The Jayakwadi dam is filled by the flow of water coming from the Nashik division. Photography at this dam is banned and driving your vehicle up to the dam is not permitted.

== Notable people ==
- Shankarrao Chavan
- Sant Eknath
- Sant Dnyaneshwar
- Shalivahan
