= Jalna, Maharashtra =

Jalna
- City
- Nicknames: City of Steel, Seed Capital of India
- Interactive map of Jalna
- Coordinates: 19.8410°N 75.8864°E
- Country: India
- State: Maharashtra
- District: Jalna
- Named for: Janullah Shah Baba (Miya Sahab) / Jalaha (Weaver)

Government
  - Type: Municipal Corporation
  - Body: Jalna City Municipal Corporation
  - Superintendent of Police: Shri. Tegbir Singh Sandhu (IPS)
  - MP: Kalyan Kale
  - MLA: Arjun Khotkar
  - Mayor: Vandana Magre
  - Deputy Mayor: Rajesh Raut

Area
  - Total: 81.6 km^{2} (31.5 sq mi)
- Elevation: 508 m (1,667 ft)

Population (2023)
  - Total: 393,000
  - Rank: 127 in India
  - Density: 4,820/km^{2} (12,500/sq mi)
- Demonym(s): Jalnekar, Jalnavi
- Time zone: UTC+5:30 (IST)
- PIN: 431203, 431213
- Telephone code: 02482
- Vehicle registration: MH-21
- Official language: Marathi
- Website: jalna.gov.in

Jalna is a city in Jalna district, in the Aurangabad division, or Marathwada region, of the Indian state of Maharashtra. It was part of Hyderabad State as a tehsil of Aurangabad district, before Jalna district was formed effective 1 May 1981. Jalna became Maharashtra's 29th Municipal Corporation.

== History ==
Jalna (formerly Jalnapur) is one example. Like Aurangabad's predecessor, Khirki, prior to the Mughal conquests Jalna had been ruled by the Ahmadnagar Sultanate, during whose reign their governor Jamshid Khan built a mosque Kali Masjid, travellers' sara’i, and a reservoir in around 1557. The town was taken by the Mughals during the reign of Akbar, and during the reigns of Aurangzeb and Nizam-ul-Mulk, Asaf Jah I, it saw numerous improvements to its civic and military infrastructure, its fort (Jalna Fort or Mastgad) being constructed in 1725 in response to Maratha incursions. Jalna is home to many religions and people from different backgrounds. One of the main religions being Hinduism, there is also a large Muslim population. The other religions in Jalna include Buddhism, Jainism and Christianity.

== Geography ==
It has an average elevation of 508 m (1,667 ft), on the banks of the Kundalika River.

== Climate ==
Climate data for Jalna
Month	Jan	Feb	Mar	Apr	May	Jun	Jul	Aug	Sep	Oct	Nov	Dec	Year
Mean daily maximum °C (°F)	29 (84)	32 (90)	36 (97)	39 (102)	39 (102)	34 (93)	30 (86)	29 (84)	30 (86)	32 (90)	30 (86)	29 (84)	32 (90)
Mean daily minimum °C (°F)	10 (50)	14 (57)	19 (66)	23 (73)	25 (77)	24 (75)	22 (72)	22 (72)	21 (70)	19 (66)	15 (59)	12 (54)	19 (66)
Average precipitation mm (inches)	1.8 (0.07)	1.1 (0.04)	6.6 (0.26)	3.1 (0.12)	28.6 (1.13)	150.1 (5.91)	152.5 (6.00)	182.3 (7.18)	156.8 (6.17)	75.2 (2.96)	13 (0.5)	12.5 (0.49)	783.6 (30.83)
Source: Jalna Weather

Jalna has been ranked 33rd best “National Clean Air City” under (Category 3 population under 3 lakhs cities) in India.

== Demographics ==
=== Religion ===
As of the 2011 census, Jalna had a population of 285,577. The total population constitute, 147,029 males and 138,485 females —a sex ratio of 942 females per 1000 males. 38,834 children are in the age group of 0–6 years, of which 20,338 are boys and 18,496 are girls. The average literacy rate stands at 81.80% with 201,829 literates.

Religions in Jalna
Religion	Percent
Hindus	60.73%
Muslims	27.34%
Buddhists	6.75%
Christians	2.81%
Jains	1.67%
Others	0.05%
Distribution of religions †Includes Sikhs (0.2%), Buddhists (<0.2%).

== Economy ==
In 1889 a cotton-spinning and weaving mill was erected in Aurangabad city, which employed 700 people. With the opening of the Nizam's Guaranteed State Railway in the year 1900, several ginning factories were started. In Jalna alone, there were 9 cotton-ginning factories and 5 cotton presses, besides two ginning factories at Aurangabad and Kannad, and one oil press at Aurangabad. The total number of people employed in the cotton presses and ginning factories in the year 1901 was 1,016.

== Transport ==
Jalna is primarily connected with the rest of India by railway and road.

=== Air ===
Aurangabad Airport is the closest airport to Jalna, it is about 55 kilometres (34 mi) away from Jalna city center, about one hour travel time by road.

=== High speed rail ===
Jalna is going to be an important station in the middle of the bullet train project proposed between Mumbai and Nagpur. Jalna is going to get a boost of high speed transport connectivity.

=== Rail ===
Jalna is a station located on the Secunderabad–Manmad line of the newly created Nanded Division of South Central Railway zone. Formerly, it had been a part of Hyderabad Division, before divisional adjustments in 2003, which saw HYB's bifurcation.

=== Road ===
Jalna is connected to major towns of the state by state highways. Road connectivity is excellent, roads connecting to Aurangabad, Pune, Ahmednagar, Nagpur, Nanded, Parbhani, Beed, Khamgaon, Jalgaon and Mumbai having been widened to four-lane highways. The new Mumbai–Nagpur Expressway (Samruddhi Mahamarg) passes through Jalna. The proposed Jalna-Nanded Expressway is also an important corridor that connects the rest of the Marathwada cities like Parbhani and Nanded to the Samruddhi Mahamarg.

=== Dry port ===
Recently, a Jalna Dry Port has been set up in the MIDC Phase 3 area near the city. This is the first dry port project in the country. A similar, smaller project is also in progress in Wardha.

== City bus service ==
The Jalna city bus service is a public bus service operated by the Maharashtra State Road Transport Corporation (MSRTC) in Jalna, Maharashtra. The city bus service was launched on 21 September 2026. Initially, buses were introduced on three routes connecting Jalna Bus Stand with Indewadi, Ramnagar and Nagewadi.

The three initial routes are Jalna Bus Stand–Indewadi, Jalna Bus Stand–Ramnagar and Jalna Bus Stand–Nagewadi.

=== Routes ===
Route	Stops in sequence
Bus Stand – Indewadi	Bus Stand → Mutha Building → Mammadevi → Gandhi Chaman → Jalna Railway Station → Nutan Vasahat → Ambad Chowk → Indewadi
Bus Stand – Ramnagar	Jalna Bus Stand → Vishal Corner → Motibaugh → Collector Office → Ambad Chowk → Mantha Chaufuly → Ramnagar
Bus Stand – Nagewadi	Jalna Bus Stand → Bhokardan Naka → Jalna Bazar Samiti → Ganpati Netralaya → JES College → SRPF → Mantha Chaufuly → Ambad Chowk → Collector Office → Motibaugh → Vishal Corner → MIDC → Nagewadi

According to reports published around the launch, the service was introduced to provide public transport within Jalna city and to facilitate daily travel for students, women, senior citizens, employees, traders, patients and other passengers.

After the inauguration, public representatives travelled by city bus from Jalna Bus Stand towards Gandhi Chowk (Chaman).

== Notable people ==
- Kailas Gorantyal Indian politician and (MLA) Member of the Legislative Assembly Maharashtra.
- Arjun Khotkar Indian politician and Ex Minister of Maharashtra State.
- Saif Tyabji was a solicitor, mathematician, an educationist & Member of Parliament from Jalna Lok Sabha constituency.
- Kalyan Kale Indian politician and (MP) Member of Parliament from JALNA

== See also ==
- Jalna Dry Port
- Jalna Fort
- Jalna-Nanded Expressway
- Kali Masjid, Jalna
- Marathwada
