= Waluj MIDC =

Indian industrial park

Coordinates: 19°49′53.88″N 75°14′4.99″E

Waluj MIDC is an Indian industrial park.

== History ==
After 1960, Maharashtra Industrial Development Corporation (MIDC) began acquiring land and setting up industrial estates. Land was acquired near the village of Waluj on the Aurangabad - Ahmednagar highway in the 1970s and 1980s. The total notified area is 1298 hectares (12.98 km^{2}).

== Clients ==
Industries which have made Waluj their home include Bajaj Auto, Varroc polymers pvt ltd, Endurance Group, Marathwada Auto Cluster, Mylan Pharmaceuticals, Endress+Hauser, Can Pack Group, Cosmo Films Group, Garware Polymer, BKT Tires, Goodyear Tires, Star Light India Ltd, Coca-Cola, Johnson & Johnson, Birla Group, Crompton Greaves, Wockhardt, Ajanta Pharma Colgate-Palmolive, Kesona polymats, Siemens, Baxter International, MAN Diesel, Carlsberg India, foster India Ltd, AB InBev, United Breweries, Carlsberg Group, Ajanta Brewery Pvt Ltd, and Lilasons Pvt Ltd. Aurangabad has been called a classic example of efforts of state government towards balanced industrialisation of the state.

== Waluj Mahanagar ==
A new industrial cum residential township has been planned at Waluj in the city of Aurangabad by the City and Industrial Development Corporation. It is 12 km southwest of Aurangabad and is well connected by road to the city. The new town is named Waluj Mahanagar.

=== New Town ===
This project is approximately eight times the size of those executed in Aurangabad city. The City and Industrial Development Corporation conceived of Waluj as a ring township, with the ring route acting as a spine for urban activities around the MIDC industrial centre, with independent and inter-linked nagars spread all around the core with their strong links between workplaces and residences. The ring routes also aim to facilitate an easy and economic transportation system to operate within the new city. Development of Waluj is encouraged through the development of core units, to boost socio-economic development of the urban fabric. The township, when fully developed, will cover an area of around 100 km^{2}.

Waluj Mahanagar, Aurangabad.
Appointment of CIDCO as S.P.A.	07.10.91
Total Notified Area (Ha.)	8,670.00
Area in Phase I (Ha.)	1714.85
Area developed to date	160.00
Area yet to be developed (Ha.)	1554.00
