= List of members of the Maharashtra Legislative Council =

LA This is a list of current and past members from the Maharashtra Legislative Council State. The state elects members for a term of six years. 30 members are indirectly elected by the state legislators. 22 members are elected from Local Authorities Constituency, 7 from Graduates Constituency and 7 from Teachers Constituency. The Governor of Maharashtra nominated up to 12 members from eminent people from various fields.

== Members of Maharashtra Legislative Council ==
Alphabetical list by last name

The list is incomplete.

- Star (*) represents current members from MH State.
- MLA - Members of Legislative Assembly (of Maharashtra State)
- LA - Local Authorities
- GR - Graduates
- TA - Teachers
- NOM - Nominated by Governor of Maharashtra State

Member	Party	Constituency	Term start	Term end	Term(s)	Notes
Kaustubh Gawade	BJP	Pune TR	07-Dec-2026	06-Dec-2032	1	
Kiran Sarnaik	SHS	Amravati TR	07-Dec-2026	06-Dec-2032	2	
Abhijit Wanjarri	INC	Nagpur GR	07-Dec-2026	06-Dec-2032	2	
Pratapsinh Patil	NCP-SP	Aurangabad GR	07-Dec-2026	06-Dec-2032	1	
Harshada Deshmukh Jadhav	NCP-SP	Pune GR	07-Dec-2026	06-Dec-2032	1	
Rajendra Raut	BJP	Solapur LA	22-Jun-2026	21-Jun-2032	1	
Prajakt Tanpure	BJP	Ahmednagar LA	22-Jun-2026	21-Jun-2032	1	
Ravindra Phatak	SHS	Thane LA	22-Jun-2026	21-Jun-2032	2	
Nandkishor Mahajan	BJP	Jalgaon LA	22-Jun-2026	21-Jun-2032	1	
Dhairyashil Kadam	BJP	Sangli-Satara LA	22-Jun-2026	21-Jun-2032	1	
Amarnath Rajurkar	BJP	Nanded LA	22-Jun-2026	21-Jun-2032	3	
Dushyant Chaturvedi	SHS	Yavatmal LA	22-Jun-2026	21-Jun-2032	2	
Vikram Kakade	NCP	Pune LA	22-Jun-2026	21-Jun-2032	1	
Avinash Bramhankar	BJP	Bhandara-Gondia LA	22-Jun-2026	21-Jun-2032	1	
Aniket Tatkare	NCP	Raigad–Ratnagiri–Sindhudurg LA	22-Jun-2026	21-Jun-2032	2	
Gokul Gite	IND	Nashik LA	22-Jun-2026	21-Jun-2032	1	
Arun Lakhani	BJP	Wardha-Chandrapur-Gadchiroli LA	22-Jun-2026	21-Jun-2032	1	
Pravin Pote	BJP	Amravati LA	22-Jun-2026	21-Jun-2032	3	
Basavraj Madhavrao Patil	BJP	Osmanabad-Latur-Beed LA	22-Jun-2026	21-Jun-2032	1	
Saeed Khan	SHS	Parbhani-Hingoli LA	22-Jun-2026	21-Jun-2032	1	
Suhas Shirsath	BJP	Aurangabad-Jalna LA	22-Jun-2026	21-Jun-2032	1	
Rajeev Potdar	BJP	Nagpur LA	22-Jun-2026	01-Jan-2028	1	By-election due to the resignation of Chandrashekhar Bawankule
Pradnya Satav	BJP	MLA's	12-May-2026	27-Jul-2030	3	defected from INC
Sunil Karjatkar	BJP	MLA's	14-May-2026	13-May-2032	1	
Pramod Jathar	BJP	MLA's	14-May-2026	13-May-2032	1	
Madhavi Naik	BJP	MLA's	14-May-2026	13-May-2032	1	
Sanjay Bhende	BJP	MLA's	14-May-2026	13-May-2032	1	
Vivek Kolhe	BJP	MLA's	14-May-2026	13-May-2032	1	
Bachchu Kadu	SHS	MLA's	14-May-2026	13-May-2032	1	
Neelam Gorhe	SHS	MLA's	14-May-2026	13-May-2032	5	
Zeeshan Siddique	NCP	MLA's	14-May-2026	13-May-2032	1	
Ambadas Danve	SS(UBT)	MLA's	14-May-2026	13-May-2032	2	
Sandip Joshi	BJP	MLA's	20-Mar-2025	13-May-2026	1	By-election due to the resignation of Pravin Datke
Dadarao Keche	BJP	MLA's	20-Mar-2025	13-May-2026	1	By-election due to the resignation of Gopichand Padalkar
Sanjay Kenekar	BJP	MLA's	20-Mar-2025	13-May-2026	1	By-election due to the resignation of Ramesh Karad
Chandrakant Raghuwanshi	SHS	MLA's	20-Mar-2024	07-Jul-2028	4	By-election due to the resignation of Aamshya Padavi
Sanjay Khodke	NCP	MLA's	20-Mar-2025	27-Jul-2030	1	By-election due to the resignation of Rajesh Vitekar
Chitra Kishor Wagh	BJP	NOM	16-Oct-2024	15-Oct-2030	1	
Vikrant Patil	BJP	NOM	16-Oct-2024	15-Oct-2030	1	
Babusingh Maharaj Rathod	BJP	NOM	16-Oct-2024	15-Oct-2030	1	
Hemant Patil	SHS	NOM	16-Oct-2024	15-Oct-2030	1	
Manisha Kayande	SHS	NOM	16-Oct-2024	15-Oct-2030	2	
Pankaj Bhujbal	NCP	NOM	16-Oct-2024	15-Oct-2030	1	
Idris Naikwadi	NCP	NOM	16-Oct-2024	15-Oct-2030	1	
Pankaja Munde	BJP	MLA's	28-Jul-2024	27-Jul-2030	1	
Yogesh Tilekar	BJP	MLA's	28-Jul-2024	27-Jul-2030	1	
Parinay Phuke	BJP	MLA's	28-Jul-2024	27-Jul-2030	2	
Sadabhau Khot	BJP	MLA's	28-Jul-2024	27-Jul-2030	2	
Amit Gorkhe	BJP	MLA's	28-Jul-2024	27-Jul-2030	1	
Krupal Tumane	SHS	MLA's	28-Jul-2024	27-Jul-2030	1	
Bhavana Gawali	SHS	MLA's	28-Jul-2024	27-Jul-2030	1	
Rajesh Vitekar	NCP	MLA's	28-Jul-2024	23-Nov-2024	1	Elected to Pathri Assembly in 2024
Shivaji Rao Garje	NCP	MLA's	28-Jul-2024	27-Jul-2030	1	
Milind Narvekar	SS(UBT)	MLA's	28-Jul-2024	27-Jul-2030	1	
Pradnya Satav	INC	MLA's	28-Jul-2024	17-Dec-2025	2	defected to BJP
Jagannath Abhyankar	SS(UBT)	Mumbai TR	08-Jul-2024	07-Jul-2030	1	
Kishor Darade	SHS	Nashik TR	08-Jul-2024	07-Jul-2030	2	
Anil Parab	SS(UBT)	Mumbai GR	08-Jul-2024	07-Jul-2030	4	
Niranjan Davkhare	BJP	Konkan GR	08-Jul-2024	07-Jul-2030	3	
Dnyaneshwar Mhatre	BJP	Konkan TR	08-Feb-2023	07-Feb-2029	1	
Vikram Kale	NCP	Aurangabad TR	08-Feb-2023	07-Feb-2029	4	
Sudhakar Adbale	Ind	Nagpur TR	08-Feb-2023	07-Feb-2029	1	
Dhiraj Lingade	INC	Amravati GR	08-Feb-2023	07-Feb-2029	1	
Satyajeet Tambe	Ind	Nashik GR	08-Feb-2023	07-Feb-2029	1	
Pravin Darekar	BJP	MLA's	08-Jul-2022	07-Jul-2028	2	
Ram Shinde	BJP	MLA's	08-Jul-2022	07-Jul-2028	1	
Uma Khapre	BJP	MLA's	08-Jul-2022	07-Jul-2028	1	
Shrikant Bhartiya	BJP	MLA's	08-Jul-2022	07-Jul-2028	1	
Prasad Lad	BJP	MLA's	08-Jul-2022	07-Jul-2028	2	
Sachin Ahir	SHS	MLA's	08-Jul-2022	07-Jul-2028	1	
Aamshya Padavi	SHS	MLA's	08-Jul-2022	23-Nov-2024	1	Elected to Akkalkuwa Assembly in 2024
Ramraje Naik Nimbalkar	NCP	MLA's	08-Jul-2022	07-Jul-2028	3	
Eknath Khadse	NCP	MLA's	08-Jul-2022	07-Jul-2028	1	
Bhai Jagtap	INC	MLA's	08-Jul-2022	07-Jul-2028	3	
Sunil Shinde	SHS	Mumbai LA	02-Jan-2022	01-Jan-2028	1	
Rajhans Singh	BJP	Mumbai LA	02-Jan-2022	01-Jan-2028	1	
Amrish Patel	BJP	Dhule–Nandurbar LA	02-Jan-2022	01-Jan-2028	4	
Chandrashekhar Bawankule	BJP	Nagpur LA	02-Jan-2022	23-Nov-2024	1	Elected to Kamthi Assembly in 2024
Vasant Khandelwal	BJP	Akola-Washim-Buldhana LA	02-Jan-2022	01-Jan-2028	1	
Satej Patil	INC	Kolhapur LA	02-Jan-2022	01-Jan-2028	2	
Pradnya Satav	INC	MLA's	23-Nov-2021	27-Jul-2024	1	By-election due to the death of Sharad Ranpise
Jayant Asgaonkar	INC	Pune TR	07-Dec-2020	06-Dec-2026	1	
Kiran Sarnaik	Ind	Amravati TR	07-Dec-2020	06-Dec-2026	1	
Abhijit Wanjarri	INC	Nagpur GR	07-Dec-2020	06-Dec-2026	1	
Satish Chavan	NCP	Aurangabad GR	07-Dec-2020	06-Dec-2026	3	
Arun Lad	NCP	Pune GR	07-Dec-2020	06-Dec-2026	1	
Amrish Patel	BJP	Dhule–Nandurbar LA	05-Dec-2020	01-Jan-2022	3	
Ranjitsinh Mohite Patil	BJP	MLA's	14-May-2020	13-May-2026	2	
Pravin Datke	BJP	MLA's	14-May-2020	23-Nov-2024	1	Elected to Nagpur Central Assembly in 2024
Gopichand Padalkar	BJP	MLA's	14-May-2020	23-Nov-2024	1	Elected to Jat Assembly in 2024
Ramesh Karad	BJP	MLA's	14-May-2020	23-Nov-2024	1	Elected to Latur Rural Assembly in 2024
Uddhav Thackeray	SHS	MLA's	14-May-2020	13-May-2026	1	
Neelam Gorhe	SHS	MLA's	14-May-2020	13-May-2026	4	
Shashikant Shinde	NCP	MLA's	14-May-2020	13-May-2026	1	
Amol Mitkari	NCP	MLA's	14-May-2020	13-May-2026	1	
Rajesh Rathod	INC	MLA's	14-May-2020	13-May-2026	1	
Dushyant Chaturvedi	SHS	Yavatmal LA	05-Feb-2020	05-Dec-2022	1	By-election due to the resignation of Tanaji Sawant
Sanjay Dound	NCP	MLA's	24-Jan-2020	07-Jul-2022	1	By-election due to the resignation of Rajesh Dhananjay Munde
Ambadas Danve	SHS	Aurangabad-Jalna LA	30-Aug-2019	29-Aug-2025	1	
Prithviraj Deshmukh	BJP	MLA's	07-Jun-2019	24-Apr-2020	1	By-election due to the death of Shivajirao Deshmukh
Arun Adsad	BJP	MLA's	24-Sep-2018	24-Apr-2020	1	By-election due to the death of Pandurang Fundkar
Nilay Naik	BJP	MLA's	28-Jul-2018	27-Jul-2024	1	
Ram Patil Ratolikar	BJP	MLA's	28-Jul-2018	27-Jul-2024	1	
Ramesh Patil	BJP	MLA's	28-Jul-2018	27-Jul-2024	1	
Vijay Girkar	BJP	MLA's	28-Jul-2018	27-Jul-2024	3	
Anil Parab	SHS	MLA's	28-Jul-2018	27-Jul-2024	3	
Manisha Kayande	SHS	MLA's	28-Jul-2018	27-Jul-2024	1	
Sharad Ranpise	INC	MLA's	28-Jul-2018	23-Sep-2021	3	Died
Wajahat Ather Mirza	INC	MLA's	28-Jul-2018	27-Jul-2024	1	
Babajani Durani	NCP	MLA's	28-Jul-2018	27-Jul-2024	2	
Jayant Patil	PWPI	MLA's	28-Jul-2018	27-Jul-2024	4	
Mahadev Jankar	RSP	MLA's	28-Jul-2018	27-Jul-2024	2	
Kapil Patil	Ind	Mumbai TR	08-Jul-2018	07-Jul-2024	3	
Kishor Darade	Ind	Nashik TR	08-Jul-2018	07-Jul-2024	1	
Vilas Potnis	SHS	Mumbai GR	08-Jul-2018	07-Jul-2024	1	
Niranjan Davkhare	BJP	Konkan GR	08-Jul-2018	07-Jul-2024	2	
Suresh Dhas	BJP	Osmanabad-Latur-Beed LA	22-Jun-2018	21-Jun-2024	1	
Pravin Pote	BJP	Amravati LA	22-Jun-2018	21-Jun-2024	2	
Ramdas Ambatkar	BJP	Wardha-Chandrapur-Gadhchiroli LA	22-Jun-2018	21-Jun-2024	1	
Narendra Darade	SHS	Nashik LA	22-Jun-2018	21-Jun-2024	1	
Viplove Bajoria	SHS	Parbhani-Hingoli LA	22-Jun-2018	21-Jun-2024	1	
Aniket Tatkare	NCP	Raigad–Ratnagiri–Sindhudurg LA	22-Jun-2018	21-Jun-2024	1	
Prasad Lad	BJP	MLA's	07-Dec-2017	07-Jul-2022	1	By-election due to the resignation of Narayan Rane
Balaram Patil	PWPI	Konkan TR	08-Feb-2017	07-Feb-2023		
Vikram Kale	NCP	Aurangabad TR	08-Feb-2017	07-Feb-2023	3	
Nago Ganar	Ind	Nagpur TR	08-Feb-2017	07-Feb-2023	2	
Ranjit Patil	BJP	Amravati GR	08-Feb-2017	07-Feb-2023	2	
Sudhir Tambe	INC	Nashik GR	08-Feb-2017	07-Feb-2023	3	
Chandulal Patel	BJP	Jalgaon LA	06-Dec-2016	05-Dec-2022	1	
Parinay Phuke	BJP	Bhandara-Gondia LA	06-Dec-2016	05-Dec-2022	1	
Tanaji Sawant	SHS	Yavatmal LA	06-Dec-2016	24-Oct-2019	1	Elected to Paranda Assembly in 2019
Mohanrao Kadam	INC	Sangli-Satara LA	06-Dec-2016	05-Dec-2022	1	
Amarnath Rajurkar	INC	Nanded LA	06-Dec-2016	05-Dec-2022	2	
Anil Bhosale	NCP	Pune LA	06-Dec-2016	05-Dec-2022	2	
Ravindra Phatak	SHS	Thane-Palghar LA	09-Jun-2016	08-Jun-2022	1	
Pravin Darekar	BJP	MLA's	08-Jul-2016	07-Jul-2022	1	
Vinayak Mete	BJP	MLA's	08-Jul-2016	07-Jul-2022	4	
R. N. Singh	BJP	MLA's	08-Jul-2016	02-Jan-2022	1	Died
Sujitsingh Thakur	BJP	MLA's	08-Jul-2016	07-Jul-2022	1	
Sadabhau Khot	BJP	MLA's	08-Jul-2016	07-Jul-2022	1	
Subhash Desai	SHS	MLA's	08-Jul-2016	07-Jul-2022	2	
Diwakar Raote	SHS	MLA's	08-Jul-2016	07-Jul-2022	4	
Ramraje Naik Nimbalkar	NCP	MLA's	08-Jul-2016	07-Jul-2022	2	
Dhananjay Munde	NCP	MLA's	08-Jul-2016	24-Oct-2019	3	Elected to Parli Assembly in 2019
Narayan Rane	INC	MLA's	08-Jul-2016	21-Sep-2017	1	Resigned
Ramdas Kadam	SHS	Mumbai LA	02-Jan-2016	01-Jan-2022	2	
Bhai Jagtap	INC	Mumbai LA	02-Jan-2016	01-Jan-2022	2	
Amrish Patel	INC	Dhule–Nandurbar LA	02-Jan-2016	01-Oct-2019	2	defected to BJP
Girish Vyas	BJP	Nagpur LA	02-Jan-2016	01-Jan-2022	1	
Gopikishan Bajoria	SHS	Akola-Washim-Buldhana LA	02-Jan-2016	01-Jan-2022	3	
Satej Patil	INC	Kolhapur LA	02-Jan-2016	01-Jan-2022	1	
Arun Jagtap	NCP	Ahmednagar LA	02-Jan-2016	01-Jan-2022	2	
Prashant Paricharak	BJP	Solapur LA	02-Jan-2016	01-Jan-2022	1	
Smita Wagh	BJP	MLA's	30-Jan-2015	24-Apr-2020	1	By-election due to the resignation of Vinod Tawde
Mahadev Jankar	RSP	MLA's	30-Jan-2015	27-Jul-2018	1	By-election due to the resignation of Ashish Shelar
Subhash Desai	SHS	MLA's	30-Jan-2015	07-Jul-2016	1	By-election due to the resignation of Prithviraj Chavan
Vinayak Mete	BJP	MLA's	30-Jan-2015	07-Jul-2016	3	defected from NCP
Sunil Tatkare	NCP	MLA's	14-Aug-2014	27-Jul-2018	1	By-election due to the resignation of Vinayak Raut
Dattatraya Sawant	Ind	Pune TR	20-Jul-2014	19-Jul-2020		
Shrikant Deshpande	Ind	Amravati TR	20-Jul-2014	19-Jul-2020	1	
Anil Sole	BJP	Nagpur GR	20-Jul-2014	19-Jul-2020	1	
Chandrakant Patil	BJP	Pune GR	20-Jul-2014	24-Oct-2019	2	Elected to Kothrud Assembly in 2019
Satish Chavan	NCP	Aurangabad GR	20-Jul-2014	19-Jul-2020	2	
Gurumukh Das Jagwani	BJP	Jalgaon LA	11-Jul-2014	05-Dec-2016	2	By-election due to the resignation of Manish Jain
Rahul Narwekar	NCP	NOM	10-Jun-2014	09-Jun-2020	1	
Prakash Gajbhiye	NCP	NOM	10-Jun-2014	09-Jun-2020	1	
Vidya Chavan	NCP	NOM	10-Jun-2014	09-Jun-2020	1	
Ramrao Wadkule	NCP	NOM	10-Jun-2014	14-Oct-2019	1	Resigned
Jagannath Shinde	NCP	NOM	10-Jun-2014	09-Jun-2020	1	
Khawaja Baig	NCP	NOM	10-Jun-2014	09-Jun-2020		
Anandrao Patil	INC	NOM	10-Jun-2014	11-Sep-2019	1	Resigned
Ramhari Rupanwar	INC	NOM	10-Jun-2014	09-Jun-2020	1	
Husna Bano Khalife	INC	NOM	10-Jun-2014	09-Jun-2020		
Husna Bano Khalife	INC	NOM	10-Jun-2014	09-Jun-2020		
Anant Gadgil	INC	NOM	16-Jun-2014	15-Jun-2020	1	
Jogendra Kawade	PRP	NOM	16-Jun-2014	15-Jun-2020		
Shivajirao Deshmukh	INC	MLA's	25-Apr-2014	14-Jan-2019		Died
Chandrakant Raghuwanshi	INC	MLA's	25-Apr-2014	01-Oct-2019	3	Resigned
Harising Rathod	INC	MLA's	25-Apr-2014	24-Apr-2020		
Anand Rajendra Thakur	NCP	MLA's	25-Apr-2014	24-Apr-2020	1	
Hemant Takle	NCP	MLA's	25-Apr-2014	24-Apr-2020	2	
Kiran Pawaskar	NCP	MLA's	25-Apr-2014	24-Apr-2020	3	
Pandurang Fundkar	BJP	MLA's	25-Apr-2014	31-May-2018	3	Died
Vinod Tawde	BJP	MLA's	25-Apr-2014	20-Oct-2014	3	Elected to Borivali Assembly in 2014
Neelam Gorhe	SHS	MLA's	25-Apr-2014	24-Apr-2020	3	
Subhash Zambad	INC	Aurangabad-Jalna LA	30-Aug-2013	29-Aug-2019	1	
Dhananjay Munde	NCP	MLA's	02-Sep-2013	07-Jul-2016	2	defected from BJP
Syed Muzaffar Hussain	INC	MLA's	07-Feb-2013	07-Jul-2016	2	By-election due to the resignation of
Manikrao Thakare	INC	MLA's	28-Jul-2012	27-Jul-2018	2	
Sanjay Satishchandra Dutt	INC	MLA's	28-Jul-2012	27-Jul-2018	3	
Sharad Ranpise	INC	MLA's	28-Jul-2012	27-Jul-2018	2	
Jaidevrao Gaikwad	NCP	MLA's	28-Jul-2012	27-Jul-2018	1	
Amarsinh Pandit	NCP	MLA's	28-Jul-2012	27-Jul-2018	1	
Narendra Annasaheb Patil	NCP	MLA's	28-Jul-2012	27-Jul-2018	1	
Vijay Girkar	BJP	MLA's	28-Jul-2012	27-Jul-2018	2	
Ashish Shelar	BJP	MLA's	28-Jul-2012	20-Oct-2014	1	Elected to Vandre West Assembly in 2014
Anil Parab	SHS	MLA's	28-Jul-2012	27-Jul-2018	2	
Vinayak Raut	SHS	MLA's	28-Jul-2012	16-May-2014	1	Elected to Ratnagiri Lok Sabha in 2014
Jayant Patil	PWPI	MLA's	28-Jul-2012	27-Jul-2018	3	
Kapil Patil	Ind	Mumbai TR	08-Jul-2012	07-Jul-2018	2	
Apoorva Hiray	Ind	Nashik TR	08-Jul-2012	07-Jul-2018	1	
Deepak Sawant	SHS	Mumbai GR	08-Jul-2012	07-Jul-2018	3	
Niranjan Davkhare	NCP	Konkan GR	08-Jul-2012	07-Jul-2018	1	
Diliprao Deshmukh	INC	Osmanabad-Latur-Beed LA	22-Jun-2012	21-Jun-2018	3	
Pravin Pote	BJP	Amravati LA	22-Jun-2012	21-Jun-2018	1	
Mitesh Bhangdiya	BJP	Wardha-Chandrapur-Gadhchiroli LA	22-Jun-2012	21-Jun-2018	1	
Jayant Jadhav	NCP	Nashik LA	22-Jun-2012	21-Jun-2018	2	
Babajani Durrani	NCP	Parbhani-Hingoli LA	22-Jun-2012	21-Jun-2018	1	
Anil Tatkare	NCP	Raigad–Ratnagiri–Sindhudurg LA	01-Jun-2012	31-May-2018	2	
Prithviraj Chavan	INC	MLA's	04-May-2011	20-Oct-2014	1	By-election due to the resignation of Sanjay Satishchandra Dutt
Kiran Pawaskar	NCP	MLA's	21-Feb-2011	24-Apr-2014	2	defected from Shiv Sena
Jayant Jadhav	NCP	Nashik LA	28-Feb-2011	21-Jun-2012	1	By-election due to the resignation of Vasant Pawar
Ramnath Mote	BJP	Konkan TR	06-Dec-2010	05-Dec-2016	2	
Vikram Kale	NCP	Aurangabad TR	06-Dec-2010	05-Dec-2016	2	
Nago Ganar	Ind	Nagpur TR	06-Dec-2010	05-Dec-2016	1	
Ranjit Patil	BJP	Amravati GR	06-Dec-2010	05-Dec-2016	1	
Sudhir Tambe	INC	Nashik GR	06-Dec-2010	05-Dec-2016	2	
Manish Jain	NCP	Jalgaon LA	06-Dec-2010	28-Feb-2014	1	Resigned
Rajendra Jain	NCP	Bhandara-Gondia LA	06-Dec-2010	05-Dec-2016	2	
Sandeep Bajoriya	NCP	Yavatmal LA	06-Dec-2010	05-Dec-2016	1	
Prabhakar Gharge	NCP	Sangli-Satara LA	06-Dec-2010	05-Dec-2016	1	
Amarnath Rajurkar	INC	Nanded LA	06-Dec-2010	05-Dec-2016	1	
Anil Bhosale	NCP	Pune LA	06-Dec-2010	05-Dec-2016	1	
Vasant Davkhare	NCP	Thane-Palghar LA	09-Jun-2010	08-Jun-2016	4	
Dipti Chaudhari	INC	MLA's	08-Jul-2010	07-Jul-2016	1	
Husain Dalwai	INC	MLA's	08-Jul-2010	03-Aug-2011	2	Elected to Rajya Sabha
Sanjay Satishchandra Dutt	INC	MLA's	08-Jul-2010	11-Mar-2011	2	Resigned
Ramraje Naik Nimbalkar	NCP	MLA's	08-Jul-2010	07-Jul-2016	1	
Prakash Bhinsale	NCP	MLA's	08-Jul-2010	07-Jul-2016	1	
Vinayak Mete	NCP	MLA's	08-Jul-2010	19-Oct-2014	2	defected to BJP
Shobha Fadnavis	BJP	MLA's	08-Jul-2010	07-Jul-2016	1	
Dhananjay Munde	BJP	MLA's	08-Jul-2010	02-Jul-2013	1	defected to NCP
Diwakar Raote	SHS	MLA's	08-Jul-2010	07-Jul-2016	3	
Vijay Sawant	Ind	MLA's	08-Jul-2010	07-Jul-2016		
Anil Tatkare	NCP	Raigad–Ratnagiri–Sindhudurg LA	26-Mar-2010	31-May-2012	1	By-election due to the resignation of Bhaskar Jadhav
Vandana Chavan	NCP	Pune LA	26-Mar-2010	05-Dec-2010	1	By-election due to the resignation of Laxman Jagtap
Ramdas Kadam	SHS	Mumbai LA	02-Jan-2010	01-Jan-2016	1	
Bhai Jagtap	INC	Mumbai LA	02-Jan-2010	01-Jan-2016	1	
Amrish Patel	INC	Dhule–Nandurbar LA	02-Jan-2010	01-Jan-2016	1	
Rajendra Mulak	INC	Nagpur LA	02-Jan-2010	01-Jan-2016	1	
Gopikishan Bajoria	SHS	Akola-Washim-Buldhana LA	02-Jan-2010	01-Jan-2016	2	
Mahadev Mahadik	INC	Kolhapur LA	02-Jan-2010	01-Jan-2016	3	
Arun Jagtap	Ind	Ahmednagar LA	02-Jan-2010	01-Jan-2016	1	
Deepakrao Salunkhe	NCP	Solapur LA	02-Jan-2010	01-Jan-2016	1	
Sudhir Tambe	INC	Nashik GR	18-Dec-2009	05-Dec-2010	1	By-election due to the resignation of Pratap Sonawane
Manikrao Thakare	INC	MLA's	20-Jun-2009	27-Jul-2012	1	By-election due to the resignation of Govindrao Adik
Ashok Mankar	BJP	Nagpur LA	19-Jan-2009	01-Jan-2010	1	By-election due to the resignation of Sagar Meghe
Madhu Jain	INC	MLA's	24-Oct-2008	07-Jul-2010	1	By-election due to the disqualification of Navnath Avhad
Bhagwan Salunkhe	BJP	Pune TR	20-Jul-2008	19-Jul-2014	1	
Vasantrao Khotare	Ind	Amravati TR	20-Jul-2008	19-Jul-2014		
Nitin Gadkari	BJP	Nagpur GR	20-Jul-2008	16-May-2014	4	Elected to Nagpur Lok Sabha
Chandrakant Patil	BJP	Pune GR	20-Jul-2008	19-Jul-2014	1	
Satish Chavan	NCP	Aurangabad GR	20-Jul-2008	19-Jul-2014	1	
Ranajagjitsinha Patil	NCP	MLA's	25-Apr-2008	24-Apr-2014	2	
Hemant Takle	NCP	MLA's	25-Apr-2008	24-Apr-2014	1	
Sanjaykaka Patil	NCP	MLA's	25-Apr-2008	25-Feb-2014		resigned
Shivajirao Deshmukh	INC	MLA's	25-Apr-2008	24-Apr-2014	1	
Jaiprakash Chhajed	INC	MLA's	25-Apr-2008	24-Apr-2014	1	
Pandurang Fundkar	BJP	MLA's	25-Apr-2008	24-Apr-2014	2	
Vinod Tawde	BJP	MLA's	25-Apr-2008	24-Apr-2014	2	
Neelam Gorhe	SHS	MLA's	25-Apr-2008	24-Apr-2014	2	
Kiran Pawaskar	SHS	MLA's	25-Apr-2008	07-Jan-2011	1	defected to NCP
Mohan Joshi	INC	NOM	13-Mar-2008	12-Mar-2014	1	
Subhash Chavan	INC	NOM	13-Mar-2008	12-Mar-2014	1	
Alka Desai	INC	NOM	13-Mar-2008	12-Mar-2014	1	
Suresh Navle	INC	NOM	13-Mar-2008	12-Mar-2014	1	
Charan Singh Sapra	INC	NOM	13-Mar-2008	12-Mar-2014	1	
M M Sheikh	INC	NOM	13-Mar-2008	12-Mar-2014		
Fouzia Khan	NCP	NOM	13-Mar-2008	12-Mar-2014	2	
Vidya Chavan	NCP	NOM	13-Mar-2008	12-Mar-2014		
Ram Pandagale	NCP	NOM	13-Mar-2008	12-Mar-2014	1	
Vijaysinh Mohite–Patil	NCP	NOM	13-Mar-2008	12-Mar-2014	1	
Ramesh Shendge	NCP	NOM	13-Mar-2008	12-Mar-2014	1	
Sumant Gaikwad	NCP	NOM	13-Mar-2008	12-Mar-2014	1	
Kishanchand Tanwani	SHS	Aurangabad-Jalna LA	30-Aug-2007	29-Aug-2013		
Vikram Kale	NCP	Aurangabad TR	18-Dec-2006	05-Dec-2010	1	By-election due to the death of Vasant Kale
Rajan Teli	INC	MLA's	28-Jul-2006	27-Jul-2012	1	
Sayed Quamruz Zama	INC	MLA's	28-Jul-2006	27-Jul-2012	1	
Govindrao Adik	INC	MLA's	28-Jul-2006	06-Mar-2009		resigned
Ulhas Pawar	NCP	MLA's	28-Jul-2006	27-Jul-2012	2	
Usha Darade	NCP	MLA's	28-Jul-2006	27-Jul-2012	1	
Arun Gujarathi	NCP	MLA's	28-Jul-2006	27-Jul-2012	1	
Keshav Mankar	BJP	MLA's	28-Jul-2006	27-Jul-2012	1	
Pasha Patel	BJP	MLA's	28-Jul-2006	27-Jul-2012	1	
Parshuram Uparkar	SHS	MLA's	28-Jul-2006	27-Jul-2012	1	
Jayant Patil	PWPI	MLA's	28-Jul-2006	27-Jul-2012	2	
Preetamkumar Shegaonkar	RPI(A)	MLA's	28-Jul-2006	27-Jul-2012		
Kapil Patil	Ind	Mumbai TR	08-Jul-2006	07-Jul-2012	1	
Diliprao Sonawane	Ind	Nashik TR	08-Jul-2006	07-Jul-2012	1	
Deepak Sawant	SHS	Mumbai GR	08-Jul-2006	07-Jul-2012	2	
Sanjay Kelkar	BJP	Konkan GR	08-Jul-2006	07-Jul-2012	1	
Diliprao Deshmukh	INC	Osmanabad-Latur-Beed LA	22-Jun-2006	21-Jun-2012	2	
Jagdish Gupta	BJP	Amravati LA	22-Jun-2006	21-Jun-2012	2	
Zainuddin Zaveri	INC	Wardha-Chandrapur-Gadhchiroli LA	22-Jun-2006	21-Jun-2012	1	
Vasant Pawar	NCP	Nashik LA	22-Jun-2006	07-Oct-2010	2	Died
Suresh Deshmukh	INC	Parbhani-Hingoli LA	22-Jun-2006	21-Jun-2012	2	
Bhaskar Jadhav	NCP	Raigad–Ratnagiri–Sindhudurg LA	01-Jun-2006	28-Oct-2009	1	Elected to Guhagar Assembly in 2009
Suresh Deshmukh	INC	Parbhani-Hingoli LA	18-Mar-2005	21-Jun-2006	1	By-election due to the resignation of Ramprasad Bordikar
Ramnath Mote	BJP	Konkan TR	06-Dec-2004	05-Dec-2010	1	
Vasant Kale	NCP	Aurangabad TR	06-Dec-2004	02-Feb-2006	1	Died
Vishwanath Daigavhane	Ind	Nagpur TR	06-Dec-2004	05-Dec-2010		
B. T. Deshmukh	Ind	Amravati GR	06-Dec-2004	05-Dec-2010		
Pratap Sonawane	BJP	Nashik GR	06-Dec-2004	16-May-2009	2	Elected to Dhule Lok Sabha in 2009
Gurumukh Das Jagwani	BJP	Jalgaon LA	06-Dec-2004	05-Dec-2010	1	
Rajendra Jain	NCP	Bhandara-Gondia LA	06-Dec-2004	05-Dec-2010	1	
Nuruddin P. Hirani	NCP	Yavatmal LA	06-Dec-2004	05-Dec-2010		
Vilasrao Bhausaheb Shinde	NCP	Sangli-Satara LA	06-Dec-2004	05-Dec-2010	1	
Kamalkishor Kadam	NCP	Nanded LA	06-Dec-2004	05-Dec-2010	2	
Laxman Jagtap	Ind	Pune LA	06-Dec-2004	24-Oct-2009	1	Elected to Chinchwad Assembly in 2009
Vasant Pawar	NCP	Nashik LA	30-Nov-2004	21-Jun-2006	1	By-election due to the resignation of Devidas Pingale
Sureshkumar Jethalia	INC	MLA's	08-Jul-2004	24-Oct-2009	1	Elected to Partur Assembly in 2009
Sanjay Satishchandra Dutt	INC	MLA's	08-Jul-2004	07-Jul-2010	1	
Pratapsinh Mohite-Patil	INC	MLA's	08-Jul-2004	07-Jul-2010	2	
Syed Muzaffar Hussain	INC	MLA's	08-Jul-2004	07-Jul-2010	1	
Shivaji Dattatray Patil	NCP	MLA's	08-Jul-2004	07-Jul-2010	2	
Manda Mhatre	NCP	MLA's	08-Jul-2004	07-Jul-2010	1	
Navnath Avhad	BJP	MLA's	08-Jul-2004	18-Jul-2008	1	Disqualified
Prakash Shendge	BJP	MLA's	08-Jul-2004	24-Oct-2009	1	Elected to Jat Assembly in 2009
Diwakar Raote	SHS	MLA's	08-Jul-2004	07-Jul-2010	2	
Anil Parab	SHS	MLA's	08-Jul-2004	07-Jul-2010	1	
Vasant Davkhare	NCP	Thane-Palghar LA	09-Jun-2004	08-Jun-2010	3	
Arvind Sawant	SHS	Mumbai LA	02-Jan-2004	01-Jan-2010	2	
Madhukar Chavan	BJP	Mumbai LA	02-Jan-2004	01-Jan-2010	1	
Chandrakant Raghuwanshi	INC	Dhule–Nandurbar LA	02-Jan-2004	01-Jan-2010	2	
Sagar Meghe	BJP	Nagpur LA	02-Jan-2004	28-Aug-2008	1	Resigned
Gopikishan Bajoria	SHS	Akola-Washim-Buldhana LA	02-Jan-2004	01-Jan-2010	1	
Mahadev Mahadik	INC	Kolhapur LA	02-Jan-2004	01-Jan-2010	2	
Yashwantrao Gadakh Patil	NCP	Ahmednagar LA	02-Jan-2004	16-Mar-2009	2	Resigned
Ranjitsinh Mohite-Patil	NCP	Solapur LA	02-Jan-2004	13-Aug-2009	1	Elected to Rajya Sabha
G. L. Ainapure	Ind	Pune TR	20-Jul-2002	19-Jul-2008		
Vasantrao Khotare	Ind	Amravati TR	20-Jul-2002	19-Jul-2008		
Nitin Gadkari	BJP	Nagpur GR	20-Jul-2002	19-Jul-2008	3	
Sharad Patil	Ind	Pune GR	20-Jul-2002	19-Jul-2008	1	
Shrikant Joshi	BJP	Aurangabad GR	20-Jul-2002	19-Jul-2008	1	
Shivaji Dattatray Patil	NCP	MLA's		07-Jul-2004	1	By-election due to the death of Arun Mehta
Shivajirao Deshmukh	INC	MLA's	25-Apr-2002	24-Apr-2008		
Sudhakar Gangane	INC	MLA's	25-Apr-2002	24-Apr-2008	1	
Sharad Ranpise	INC	MLA's	25-Apr-2002	24-Apr-2008	1	
Ranajagjitsinha Patil	NCP	MLA's	25-Apr-2002	24-Apr-2008	1	
Sadashiv Pol	NCP	MLA's	25-Apr-2002	24-Apr-2008	1	
Pandurang Fundkar	BJP	MLA's	25-Apr-2002	24-Apr-2008	1	
Vinod Tawde	BJP	MLA's	25-Apr-2002	24-Apr-2008	1	
Madhukar Sarpotdar	SHS	MLA's	25-Apr-2002	24-Apr-2008	1	
Neelam Gorhe	SHS	MLA's	25-Apr-2002	24-Apr-2008	1	
M A Aziz	INC	NOM	21-Feb-2002	20-Feb-2008		
Sudha Joshi	INC	NOM	21-Feb-2002	20-Feb-2008	1	
Ramesh Nikose	INC	NOM	21-Feb-2002	20-Feb-2008	1	
Dhondiram Rathod	INC	NOM	21-Feb-2002	20-Feb-2008		
Dhanaji Sathe	INC	NOM	21-Feb-2002	20-Feb-2008	1	
Sudhir Sawant	INC	NOM	21-Feb-2002	20-Feb-2008	1	
Jitendra Awhad	NCP	NOM	21-Feb-2002	20-Feb-2008	1	
Gurunath Kulkarni	NCP	NOM	21-Feb-2002	20-Feb-2008	1	
Fouzia Khan	NCP	NOM	21-Feb-2002	20-Feb-2008	1	
Vasantrao Chavan	NCP	NOM	21-Feb-2002	20-Feb-2008		
Jagannath Shewale	NCP	NOM	21-Feb-2002	20-Feb-2008	1	
Girish Gandhi	NCP	NOM	21-Feb-2002	20-Feb-2008	1	
Ulhas Pawar	INC	MLA's	28-Jul-2000	27-Jul-2006	1	
Govindrao Adik	INC	MLA's	28-Jul-2000	27-Jul-2006		
Syed Khatib Natikuddin	INC	MLA's	28-Jul-2000	27-Jul-2006	1	
Vinayak Mete	NCP	MLA's	28-Jul-2000	27-Jul-2006	1	
Vilas Avchat	SHS	MLA's	28-Jul-2000	27-Jul-2006	1	
Deepak Sawant	SHS	MLA's	28-Jul-2000	27-Jul-2006	1	
Kanhaiyalal Gidwani	SHS	MLA's	28-Jul-2000	27-Jul-2006		
Shantaram Karmalkar	BJP	MLA's	28-Jul-2000	27-Jul-2006	1	
Kanta Nalawade	BJP	MLA's	28-Jul-2000	27-Jul-2006	1	
Jayant Patil	PWPI	MLA's	28-Jul-2000	27-Jul-2006	1	
Dayanand Mhaske	RPI(A)	MLA's	28-Jul-2000	27-Jul-2006		
Sanjivani Raykar	BJP	Mumbai TR	08-Jul-2000	07-Jul-2006		
Nanasaheb Borste	Ind	Nashik TR	08-Jul-2000	07-Jul-2006		
Pramod Navalkar	SHS	Mumbai GR	08-Jul-2000	07-Jul-2006	3	
Ashok Modak	BJP	Konkan GR	08-Jul-2000	07-Jul-2006		
Diliprao Deshmukh	INC	Osmanabad-Latur-Beed LA	22-Jun-2000	21-Jun-2006	1	
Jagdish Gupta	BJP	Amravati LA	22-Jun-2000	21-Jun-2006	1	
Ramdas Tadas	NCP	Wardha-Chandrapur-Gadhchiroli LA	22-Jun-2000	21-Jun-2006	2	
Devidas Pingale	NCP	Nashik LA	22-Jun-2000	25-May-2004	1	Elected to Nashik Lok Sabha in 2004
Ramprasad Bordikar	INC	Parbhani-Hingoli LA	22-Jun-2000	17-Oct-2004	1	Elected to Jintur Assembly in 2004
Anant Tare	SHS	Raigad–Ratnagiri–Sindhudurg LA	01-Jun-2000	31-May-2006	1	
Datta Meghe	NCP	NOM	2000	Jan-2002		By-election due to the resignation of Vinayak Mete
Vasantrao Kale	INC	Aurangabad GR	07-Mar-1999	19-Jul-2002	2	
Suresh Moreshwar	Ind	Konkan TR	06-Dec-1998	05-Dec-2004	1	
		Aurangabad TR	06-Dec-1998	05-Dec-2004		
Vishwanath Daigavhane	Ind	Nagpur TR	06-Dec-1998	05-Dec-2004		
B. T. Deshmukh	Ind	Amravati GR	06-Dec-1998	05-Dec-2004		
Pratap Sonawane	BJP	Nashik GR	06-Dec-1998	05-Dec-2004	1	
Sharad Wani	SHS	Jalgaon LA	06-Dec-1998	05-Dec-2004	1	
Gopaldas Agrawal	INC	Bhandara-Gondia LA	06-Dec-1998	05-Dec-2004	1	
Nuruddin P. Hirani	INC	Yavatmal LA	06-Dec-1998	05-Dec-2004		
Vishuanna Patil	INC	Sangli-Satara LA	06-Dec-1998	05-Dec-2004		
Kamalkishor Kadam	INC	Nanded LA	06-Dec-1998	05-Dec-2004	1	
Ramkrishna More	INC	Pune LA	06-Dec-1998	02-Nov-2003		Died
N. S. Pharande	BJP	MLA's	08-Jul-1998	07-Jul-2004	1	
Pratapsinh Mohite-Patil	BJP	MLA's	08-Jul-1998	29-Sep-2003	1	Elected to Solapur Lok Sabha
Vijay Girkar	BJP	MLA's	08-Jul-1998	07-Jul-2004	1	
Diwakar Raote	SHS	MLA's	08-Jul-1998	07-Jul-2004	1	
Vijay Wadettiwar	SHS	MLA's	08-Jul-1998	07-Jul-2004	1	
Ranjeet Deshmukh	INC	MLA's	08-Jul-1998	07-Jul-2004	1	
Vasant Chavan	INC	MLA's	08-Jul-1998	07-Jul-2004	3	
Arun Mehta	Ind	MLA's	08-Jul-1998	19-Feb-2002	3	
Makhram Pawar	BBM	MLA's	08-Jul-1998	07-Jul-2004		
Gangadhar Patne	JD	MLA's	08-Jul-1998	07-Jul-2004		
Vasant Davkhare	INC	Thane-Palghar LA	09-Jun-1998	08-Jun-2004	2	
Sudhir Joshi	SHS	Mumbai LA	02-Jan-1998	01-Jan-2004		
Husain Dalwai	SP	Mumbai LA	02-Jan-1998	01-Jan-2004	1	
Chandrakant Raghuwanshi	INC	Dhule–Nandurbar LA	02-Jan-1998	01-Jan-2004	1	
Balwantrao Dhoble	BJP	Nagpur LA	02-Jan-1998	01-Jan-2004		
		Akola-Washim-Buldhana LA	02-Jan-1998	01-Jan-2004		
Mahadev Mahadik	Ind	Kolhapur LA	02-Jan-1998	01-Jan-2004	1	
Yashwantrao Gadakh Patil	INC	Ahmednagar LA	02-Jan-1998	01-Jan-2004	1	
Subhash Deshmukh	BJP	Solapur LA	02-Jan-1998	01-Jan-2004	1	
		Pune TR	20-Jul-1996	19-Jul-2002		
		Amravati TR	20-Jul-1996	19-Jul-2002		
Nitin Gadkari	BJP	Nagpur GR	20-Jul-1996	19-Jul-2002	2	
Prakash Javadekar	BJP	Pune GR	20-Jul-1996	19-Jul-2002	2	
Jaisingrao Gaikwad Patil	BJP	Aurangabad GR	20-Jul-1996	03-Mar-1998	2	Elected to Beed Lok Sabha in 1998
Shishir Shinde	SHS	MLA's	25-Apr-1996	24-Apr-2002	1	
Ravindra Mirlekar	SHS	MLA's	25-Apr-1996	24-Apr-2002		
Prakash Deole	SHS	MLA's	25-Apr-1996	24-Apr-2002		
Anna Dange	BJP	MLA's	25-Apr-1996	24-Apr-2002	2	
Nishigandha Mogal	BJP	MLA's	25-Apr-1996	24-Apr-2002	1	
Lalsing Rathod	Ind	MLA's	25-Apr-1996	24-Apr-2002		
Shivajirao Deshmukh	INC	MLA's	25-Apr-1996	24-Apr-2002		
Chhagan Bhujbal	INC	MLA's	25-Apr-1996	24-Apr-2002	1	
Ramdas Phutane	INC	MLA's	25-Apr-1996	24-Apr-2002		
Shantaram Nandgaonkar	SHS	NOM	Jan-1996	Jan-2002		
Jaiprakash Baviskar	SHS	NOM	Jan-1996	Jan-2002		
Nitin Shinde	SHS	NOM	Jan-1996	Jan-2002		
Arvind Sawant	SHS	NOM	Jan-1996	Jan-2002		
Balasaheb Salunke	SHS	NOM	Jan-1996	Jan-2002		
Umesh Pawar	SHS	NOM	Jan-1996	Jan-2002		
Sandesh Kondvilkar	BJP	NOM	Jan-1996	Jan-2002		
Subhash Dapke	BJP	NOM	Jan-1996	Jan-2002		
Shaligram Bassaiye	BJP	NOM	Jan-1996	Jan-2002		
Veena Sharma	BJP	NOM	Jan-1996	Jan-2002		
Indutai Nakade	BJP	NOM	Jan-1996	Jan-2002		
Vinayak Mete	SHS	NOM	Jan-1996	21-Apr-2000	1	defected to NCP
Kripashankar Singh	INC	MLA's	28-Jul-1994	27-Jul-2000		
Babanrao Dhakne	INC	MLA's	28-Jul-1994	27-Jul-2000		
Avinash Vasantrao Naik	INC	MLA's	28-Jul-1994	27-Jul-2000		
Krishnarao Bhegde	INC	MLA's	28-Jul-1994	27-Jul-2000		
Kishore Kashikar	INC	MLA's	28-Jul-1994	27-Jul-2000		
Azhar Hussain	INC	MLA's	28-Jul-1994	27-Jul-2000		
Vidya Balose	INC	MLA's	28-Jul-1994	27-Jul-2000		
Anil Godane	RPI	MLA's	28-Jul-1994	27-Jul-2000		
Hansraj Ahir	BJP	MLA's	28-Jul-1994	10-May-1996	1	Elected to Chandrapur Lok Sabha in 1996
Neela Desai	SHS	MLA's	28-Jul-1994	27-Jul-2000	1	
Venkappa Patki	JD	MLA's	28-Jul-1994	27-Jul-2000		
Sanjivani Raykar	INC	Mumbai TR	08-Jul-1994	07-Jul-2000		
		Nashik TR	08-Jul-1994	07-Jul-2000		
Pramod Navalkar	SHS	Mumbai GR	08-Jul-1994	07-Jul-2000	2	
Ashok Modak	BJP	Konkan GR	08-Jul-1994	07-Jul-2000		
		Osmanabad-Latur-Beed LA	22-Jun-1994	21-Jun-2000		
Vasudhatai Deshmukh	INC	Amravati LA	22-Jun-1994	07-Oct-1999		Elected to Achalpur Assembly in 1999
Ramdas Tadas	Ind	Wardha-Chandrapur-Gadhchiroli LA	22-Jun-1994	21-Jun-2000	1	
S. T. Ahire	Ind	Nashik LA	22-Jun-1994	21-Jun-2000		
Rajani Satav	INC	Parbhani-Hingoli LA	22-Jun-1994	21-Jun-2000		
Vijay Sawant	INC	Raigad–Ratnagiri–Sindhudurg LA	01-Jun-1994	31-May-2000		
Arun Mehta	INC	MLA's		07-Jul-1998	2	By-election due to the resignation of Ramesh More
Ashok Chavan	INC	MLA's	08-Jul-1992	07-Jul-1998	1	
Mushtaq Antulay	INC	MLA's	08-Jul-1992	07-Jul-1998		
Madhukar Kimmatkar	INC	MLA's	08-Jul-1992	07-Jul-1998		
Jayant Shridhar Tilak	INC	MLA's	08-Jul-1992	07-Jul-1998		
Vasant Chavan	INC	MLA's	08-Jul-1992	07-Jul-1998	2	
Hasmukh Upadhyay	INC	MLA's	08-Jul-1992	07-Jul-1998	2	
Celine D'Silva	INC	MLA's	08-Jul-1992	07-Jul-1998		
D B Patil	PWPI	MLA's	08-Jul-1992	07-Jul-1998	1	
Dharamchand Chordia	BJP	MLA's	08-Jul-1992	07-Jul-1998	1	
Ramesh More	SHS	MLA's	08-Jul-1992	29-May-1993	1	assassinated
Vasant Davkhare	INC	Thane-Palghar LA	09-Jun-1992	08-Jun-1998	1	
Sudhakar Deshmukh	INC	MLA's	22-Jul-1991	24-Apr-1996	1	By-election due to the resignation of Datta Meghe
		Pune TR	20-Jul-1990	19-Jul-1996		
		Amravati TR	20-Jul-1990	19-Jul-1996		
Nitin Gadkari	BJP	Nagpur GR	20-Jul-1990	19-Jul-1996	1	
Prakash Javadekar	BJP	Pune GR	20-Jul-1990	19-Jul-1996	1	
Jaisingrao Gaikwad Patil	BJP	Aurangabad GR	20-Jul-1990	19-Jul-1996	1	
Datta Meghe	INC	MLA's	25-Apr-1990	15-Jun-1991	3	Elected to Nagpur Lok Sabha in 1991
Ramrao Adik	INC	MLA's	25-Apr-1990	24-Apr-1996	3	
		MLA's	25-Apr-1990	24-Apr-1996		
		MLA's	25-Apr-1990	24-Apr-1996		
		MLA's	25-Apr-1990	24-Apr-1996		
Anna Dange	BJP	MLA's	25-Apr-1990	24-Apr-1996		
Vijay Mude	BJP	MLA's	25-Apr-1990	24-Apr-1996	1	
Dattaji Salvi	SHS	MLA's	25-Apr-1990	24-Apr-1996		
Ramdas Athawale	RPI	MLA's	25-Apr-1990	24-Apr-1996	1	
Baliram Hiray	INC	NOM	06-Jan-1990	05-Jan-1996		
T. M. Kamble	INC	NOM	06-Jan-1990	05-Jan-1996		
R. D. Nikam	INC	NOM	06-Jan-1990	05-Jan-1996		
Manohar Phalke	INC	NOM	06-Jan-1990	05-Jan-1996		
Nath Paullbudhe	INC	NOM	06-Jan-1990	05-Jan-1996		
Namdeo Dhondo Mahanor	INC	NOM	06-Jan-1990	05-Jan-1996		
Laxman Mane	INC	NOM	06-Jan-1990	05-Jan-1996		
Vijay More	INC	NOM	06-Jan-1990	05-Jan-1996		
A. R. Khan	INC	NOM	06-Jan-1990	05-Jan-1996		
Ram Tolani	INC	NOM	06-Jan-1990	05-Jan-1996		
Madhukar Wasnik	INC	NOM	06-Jan-1990	05-Jan-1996		
Yashodhara Bajaj	INC	NOM	06-Jan-1990	05-Jan-1996		
Keshavrao Rane	INC	MLA's	21-Oct-1988	07-Jul-1992		By-election due to the resignation of Shankarrao Chavan
Ishaq Jamkhanawala	INC	MLA's	28-Jul-1988	27-Jul-1994		
N. M. Kamble	INC	MLA's	28-Jul-1988	27-Jul-1994		
Vithal Dikonda	INC	MLA's	28-Jul-1988	27-Jul-1994		
Bajirao Shinde	INC	MLA's	28-Jul-1988	27-Jul-1994		
Krishnarao Pandav	INC	MLA's	28-Jul-1988	27-Jul-1994		
Narayan Munde	INC	MLA's	28-Jul-1988	27-Jul-1994		
Bhaskarrao Shinde	INC	MLA's	28-Jul-1988	27-Jul-1994		
Keshavrao Autade	INC	MLA's	28-Jul-1988	27-Jul-1994		
R. S. Gavai	RPI	MLA's	28-Jul-1988	27-Jul-1994		
V Deshmukh	PWPI	MLA's	28-Jul-1988	27-Jul-1994		
Suryabhan Vahadane-Patil	BJP	MLA's	28-Jul-1988	27-Jul-1994	2	
Pramod Navalkar	SHS	Mumbai GR	08-Jul-1988	07-Jul-1994	1	
Vasant Patwardhan	BJP	Konkan GR	08-Jul-1988	07-Jul-1994		
		Osmanabad-Latur-Beed LA	22-Jun-1988	21-Jun-1994		
Vasudhatai Deshmukh	INC	Amravati LA	22-Jun-1988	21-Jun-1994		
Vasantrao Wankhede	INC	Wardha-Chandrapur-Gadhchiroli LA	22-Jun-1988	21-Jun-1994		
Sabir Ahmed	INC	Nashik LA	22-Jun-1988	21-Jun-1994		
Ratan Lal	INC	Parbhani-Hingoli LA	22-Jun-1988	21-Jun-1994		
Vijay Sawant	PWPI	Raigad–Ratnagiri–Sindhudurg LA	01-Jun-1988	31-May-1994		
Shankarrao Chavan	INC	MLA's	08-Jul-1986	26-Jun-1988		Elected to Rajya Sabha
Jayant Shridhar Tilak	INC	MLA's	08-Jul-1986	07-Jul-1992		
Vasant Chavan	INC	MLA's	08-Jul-1986	07-Jul-1992	1	
Shrikant Jichkar	INC	MLA's	08-Jul-1986	07-Jul-1992		
Rohidas Patil	INC	MLA's	08-Jul-1986	07-Jul-1992		
Leon D'Souza	INC	MLA's	08-Jul-1986	07-Jul-1992		
Arun Mehta	IC(S)	MLA's	08-Jul-1986	07-Jul-1992	1	
Muralidharanna Pawar	IC(S)	MLA's	08-Jul-1986	07-Jul-1992		
Vitthalrao Hande	PWPI	MLA's	08-Jul-1986	07-Jul-1992		
Hasmukh Upadhyay	JP	MLA's	08-Jul-1986	07-Jul-1992	1	
Vasantrao Kale	INC	Aurangabad GR	20-Jul-1984	19-Jul-1990	1	
Narayan Shripad Vaidya	BJP	Pune GR	1984	1990	1	
Madhu Deolekar	BJP	Mumbai GR	1982	1988		
Manohar Joshi	SHS	MLA's	08-Jul-1980	07-Jul-1986		
Pramod Navalkar	SHS	MLA's	08-Jul-1980	07-Jul-1986		
Wamanrao Mahadik	SHS	MLA's	08-Jul-1980	07-Jul-1986		
Madhu Deolekar	BJS	Mumbai GR	1978	1982		
G P Pradhan	IC(S)	Pune GR	1978	1984	2	
G P Pradhan	SSP	Pune GR	1972	1978	1	
Uttamrao Patil	BJS	Nashik GR	1972	1978	3	
Uttamrao Patil	BJS	Nashik GR	1966	1972	2	
Vasudev Balwant Gogate	HMS	Pune GR	1960	1966		
Uttamrao Patil	BJS	Nashik GR	1954	1955	1	

Name (alphabetical by last name)	Party	Constituency	Date of appointment	Date of retirement	Term	Notes
Ramrao Adik	INC	Elected by MLAs	1978	1984	1	
Ramrao Adik	INC	Elected by MLAs	1984	1990	2	
Aloo Jal Chibber	INC	Elected by MLA	1978	1984	2	-
Jagannath Sitaram Akarte	INC	Elected by MLAs	1962	1968	1	
Yashwant Ambedkar	RPI	Electrical by MLAs	1960	1966	1	
Sarojini Babar	Ind.	Nominated			1	
Subhash Bhoir	NCP	Elected by MLAs			1	
Tejsingrao Bhosale					1	
Madhu Dandavate	PSP	Elected by MLAs	1970	1971	1	Elected to LS, Rajapur
B. T. Deshmukh	Ind	Amravati Teachers	1996	2002	1	
R. S. Gavai	RPI	Elected by MLAs	1964	1970	1	
R. S. Gavai	RPI	Elected by MLAs	1970	1976	2	
R. S. Gavai	RPI	Elected by MLAs	1976	1982	3	
R. S. Gavai	RPI	Elected by MLAs	1982	1988	4	
Chandukaka Jagtap	NCP	Pune LA	09/03/2004	01/01/2005	1	
Manohar Joshi	SS	Elected by MLAs	1972	1980	1	
Manohar Joshi	SS	Elected by MLAs	1988	1989	3	Res. Elected to MH Assembly
Sudhir Joshi	SS	Elected by MLAs	1986	1992	1	
Sudhir Joshi	SS	Elected by MLAs	1993	1999	2	
Pappu Kalani	NCP	Elected by MLAs		1999	1	
Shankar Ramchandra Kharat	Independent				1	
Gajanan Digambar Madgulkar	Ind				1	
Datta Meghe	INC	Elected by MLAs	02/04/1978	1984	1	
Datta Meghe	INC	Elected by MLAs	1984	1990	3	
Dhulappa Bhaurao Navale	INC	Satara-cum-Sangli	1963	1969	1	
Dhulappa Bhaurao Navale	INC	Satara-cum-Sangli	1969	1972	2	
V S Page	INC	Elected by MLAs	1960	1966	1	
V S Page	INC	Elected by MLAs	1966	1972	2	
V S Page	INC	Elected by MLAs	1972	1978	3	
Avinash Pande	INC	Elected by MLAs			1	
Shakuntala Paranjpye	Independent	Nominated	1958	1964	1	
Gulabrao Patil	INC	Elected by MLAs	1983	1987	1	
Shivajirao Girdhar Patil	INC	Elected by MLAs	1960	1967	1	
R. D. Pradhan	INC	Elected by MLAs	1990	1996	1	
Linganna Pujari	INC	Mumbai LA	1972	1978	1	
Prabhakar Sanzgiri	CPI-M	Elected by MLAs	1980	1986	1	
Rikhabchand Sharma	INC	Elected by MLA		196x	1	
Suryabhan Vahadane-Patil	BJP	Elected by MLAs	1982	1988	1	
M G Vaidya	Ind.	Elected by MLAs			1	
Rafiq Zakaria	INC				1	
P T Madhale	Scheduled Castes Federation SCF	Vita-Sangli	Elected MLA	1937 1957		
