= Davkhare =

Davkhare is a surname. Notable people with the surname include:

- Niranjan Davkhare
- Vasant Davkhare
