= Sanjay Mukund Kelkar =

Indian politician

Member of the Maharashtra Legislative Assembly
- Incumbent
- Assumed office 2014
- Preceded by: Rajan Vichare
- Constituency: Thane

Member of the Maharashtra Legislative Council
- In office 8 July 2006 – 7 July 2012
- Preceded by: Ashok Gajanan Modak
- Succeeded by: Niranjan Davkhare
- Constituency: Konkan Graduates

Personal details
- Born: 9 July 1956 (age 68); Thane, Bombay state
- Political party: Bharatiya Janata Party
- Parent: Mukund Kelkar (father)
- Education: Bachelor of Commerce; Bachelor of Law
- Occupation: Politician, Tax consultant
- Website: sanjaymkelkar.com

Sanjay Mukund Kelkar is an Indian politician and member of the Bharatiya Janata Party. He is a second term member of the Maharashtra Legislative Assembly.

== Constituency ==
Sanjay Mukund Kelkar is elected from the Thane-City Assembly Constituency Maharashtra.

== Positions held ==
- Maharashtra Legislative Assembly MLA.
- Terms in office: 2014–Present
