= Bhai Jagtap =

Indian politician

Deputy Leader of the Opposition Maharashtra Legislative Council
- In office 17 August 2022 – 29 August 2025
- Governor: Bhagat Singh Koshyari; Ramesh Bais; C. P. Radhakrishnan
- Leader of the Opposition: Ambadas Danve
- Chairmen of the House: Neelam Gorhe Acting; Ram Shinde
- Preceded by: Niranjan Davkhare
- Succeeded by: Vacant (Note: No leader of opposition because no political party obtained at least 10% of the seats in the council.)

President of Mumbai Regional Congress Committee
- In office 19 December 2020 – 9 June 2023
- National President Indian National Congress: Sonia Gandhi (Interim); Mallikarjun Kharge
- Preceded by: Eknath Gaikwad
- Succeeded by: Varsha Gaikwad

Member of Maharashtra Legislative Council
- Incumbent
- Assumed office January 2016

Member of Maharashtra Legislative Assembly
- In office 2004–2009
- Preceded by: Atul Shah
- Constituency: Khetwadi

Personal details
- Party: Indian National Congress
- Spouse: Tejaswani Jagtap
- Children: 2, including Manali Jagtap
- Occupation: Politician

Bhai Jagtap (birth name Ashok Arjunrao Jagtap) is an Indian politician and member of the Indian National Congress from Mumbai Maharashtra. He is a three term Maharashtra Legislative Council (MLC) currently servicing and a one term Maharashtra Legislative Assembly (MLA). He formerly served as the President of the Mumbai Regional Congress Committee.

== Political career ==
Jagtap started his political career as a trade union leader. His Bharatiya Kamgar Karmachari Mahasangh was a success story among trade unions. In 2001, he joined the Indian National Congress and stood for assembly election in the 2004 election in which he won the Khetwadi constituency.
