= Girkar =

Girkar is a surname. Notable people with the surname include:

- Nilesh Girkar, Indian filmmaker
- Vijay Girkar, Indian politician
- OM Girkar, Creative Developer
