= Kayande =

Kayande is a surname. Notable people with the surname include:

- Manoj Kayande (born 1989), MLA from Maharashtra
- Manisha Kayande (fl. 2009), Indian politician from Maharashtra
- Samir Kayande (born 1972), Canadian politician from Alberta
