= Nagpur Teachers constituency =

Constituency of the Maharashtra Legislative Council

Nagpur Teachers constituency is one of 78 Legislative Council seats in Maharashtra. This constituency encompasses the entire Nagpur division, which includes the districts of Nagpur, Wardha, Bhandara, Gondia, Chandrapur and Gadchiroli.

== Members of Legislative Council ==
Year	Member	Party
1998	Vishwanath Daigavhane	Independent
2004	Vishwanath Daigavhane	Independent
2010	Nago Ganar	Independent
2017	Nago Ganar	Independent
2023	Sudhakar Adbale	Independent
