= Madhukar Sarpotdar =

Indian politician

Member of Maharashtra Legislative Council
- In office 25 April 2002 – 24 April 2008
- Preceded by: Ravindra Mirlekar
- Succeeded by: Kiran Pawaskar
- Constituency: elected by Members of Legislative Assembly

Member of Parliament, Lok Sabha
- In office 16 May 1996 – 19 March 1999
- Preceded by: Sunil Dutt
- Succeeded by: Sunil Dutt
- Constituency: Mumbai North West

Member of Maharashtra Legislative Assembly
- In office 1990–1996
- Preceded by: Janardan Chandurkar
- Succeeded by: Shrikant Sarmalkar
- Constituency: Kherwadi

Personal details
- Born: 31 January 1936 Anjanari, Ratnagiri district
- Died: 2 February 2010 (aged 74) Mumbai, Maharashtra, India
- Spouse: Mangala (m. 1960–2010)
- Children: 1 son
- Education: Bachelor of Arts
- Alma mater: Bombay University
- Profession: Trade Unionist, Politician

Madhukar Sarpotdar (1936–2010) was a leader of Shiv Sena and a member of Lok Sabha elected from Mumbai North West. He was trade unionist and a member of Maharashtra Legislative Assembly elected in 1990.
