= Konkan Teachers constituency =

Konkan Teachers constituency is one of 78 Legislative Council seats in Maharashtra. This constituency covers Thane, Palghar, Raigad, Ratnagiri & Sindhudurg districts.

== Members of Legislative Council ==
Year	Member	Party
1962	Jagannath Bhave	Bharatiya Jana Sangh
1972	Jagannath Bhave	Bharatiya Jana Sangh
1998	Suresh Moreshwar	Independent
2004	Ramnath Mote	Bharatiya Janata Party
2010	Ramnath Mote	Bharatiya Janata Party
2017	Balaram Patil	Peasants and Workers Party of India
2023	Dnyaneshwar Mhatre	Bharatiya Janata Party
