= Milind Narvekar =

Indian politician

- मिलिंद नार्वेकर

Member of Maharashtra Legislative Council
- Incumbent
- Assumed office 28 July 2024
- Governor: Ramesh Bais
- Chairman of Council: Neelam Gorhe (Additional Charge)
- Constituency: Elected by MLAs

Personal details
- Party: Shiv Sena(UBT)
- Occupation: Politician

Milind Narvekar (Marathi: मिलिंद नार्वेकर) is an Indian politician and leader of Shiv Sena (UBT) from Maharashtra. He is a member of Maharashtra Legislative Council.

== Positions held ==
- 2024: Elected to Maharashtra Legislative Council (1st term)

== See also ==
- List of members of the Maharashtra Legislative Council
