= Chandrakant Raghuwanshi =

Indian politician

Member of Legislative Council of Maharashtra
- Incumbent
- Assumed office 20 March 2025
- Preceded by: Aamshya Padavi
- Constituency: Elected by MLA's

Member of Legislative Council of Maharashtra
- In office (1998–2004), (2004 – 2010)
- Succeeded by: Amrish Patel
- Constituency: Dhule–Nandurbar Local Authorities constituency
- In office (2014–2019)
- Constituency: Elected by MLA's

Personal details
- Born: 12 November 1959 (age 66)
- Party: Shiv Sena (2019–Present)
- Other political affiliations: Indian National Congress (Before Oct 2019)
- Spouse: Ratna Chandrakant Raghuwanshi (wife)
- Relations: Ram Chandrakant Raghuwanshi (son)

Chandrakant Batesingh Raghuwanshi is an Indian politician and leader of Shiv Sena from Nandurbar district. He was a member of Maharashtra Legislative Council.

== Positions held ==
- 2014: Elected to Maharashtra Legislative Council

== See also ==
- List of members of the Maharashtra Legislative Council
