= Kapil Harishchandra Patil =

Indian politician

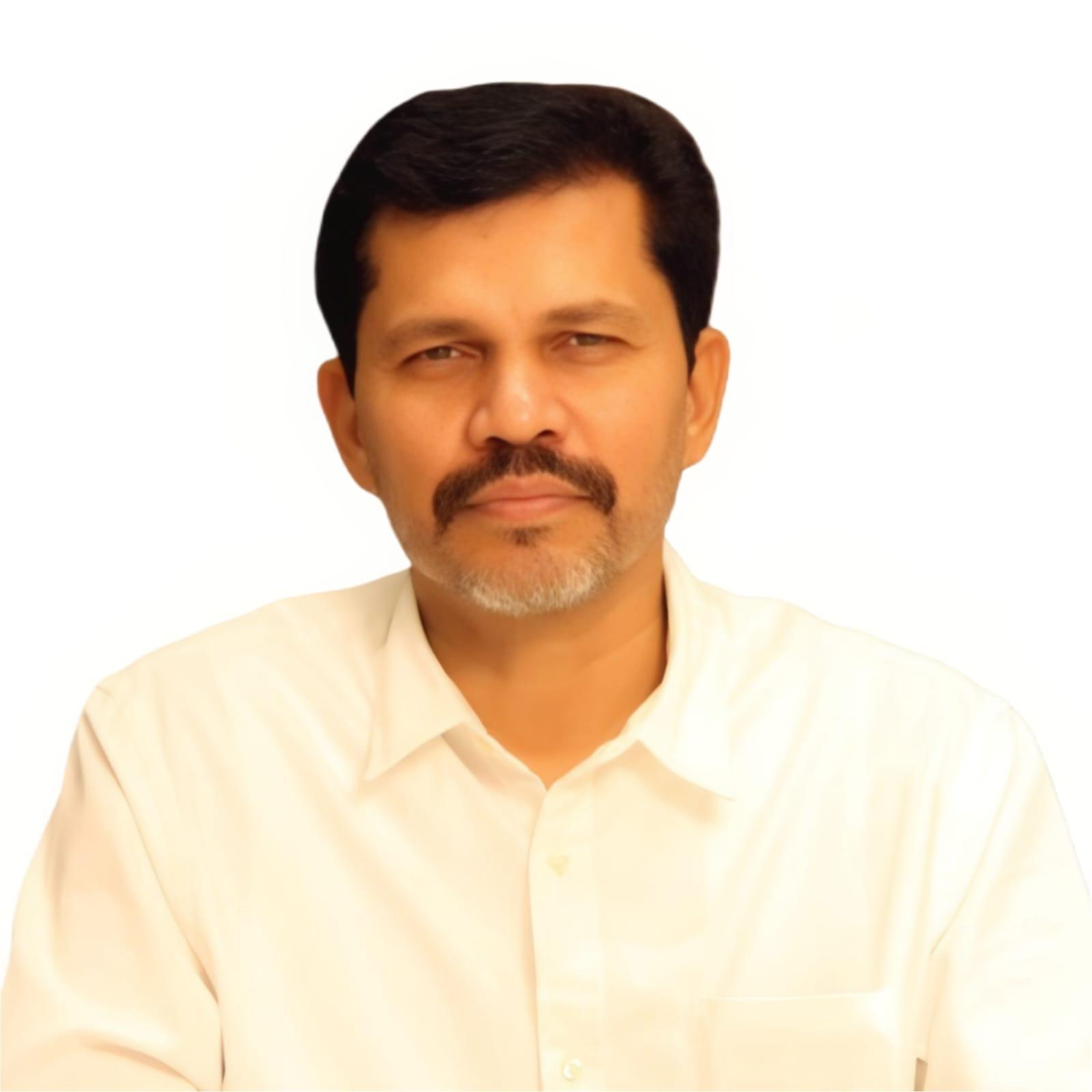

Ex Member of Maharashtra Legislative Council
- In office (2006-2012), (2012-2018), (2018 – 2024)
- Preceded by: Himself
- Constituency: Mumbai Teachers constituency

Personal details
- Party: Janata Dal (United) (JDU)

Kapil Harishchandra Patil (better known as Kapil Patil) is an Indian socialist politician, educationist, trade union leader, and former journalist. He represented the Mumbai Teachers constituency in the Maharashtra Legislative Council for three consecutive terms (2006–2024).

== Early Activism and Student Movement ==
Kapil Patil began his public life as a student activist. He was the founder secretary of Chhatra Bharati, a student movement, and worked closely with editor Yadunath Thatte of Sadhana (weekly) and writer M. B. Shah, the founder president of Chhatra Bharati. He later served as secretary of the Namantarwadi Action Committee and actively participated in the movement for the renaming of Marathwada University.

Patil is the founder and former president of Shikshak Bharati, Maharashtra’s largest government-recognized teachers’ organization.

In 2009, Kapil Patil rejected a flat allotted under the MHADA legislators’ quota in Versova, Mumbai, and wrote to chief minister Ashok Chavan stating that elected representatives should not receive subsidised housing. In 2016, he urged chief minister Devendra Fadnavis to scrap or reduce such quotas. He argued that MHADA housing should prioritise economically weaker sections.

On 8 March 2010 (International Women’s Day), he played a key role in securing six months of fully paid maternity leave for women teachers, later extended to all women government employees in Maharashtra.

He led a sea march in Mumbai to secure compensation for fishermen affected by drought-like conditions and cyclones, resulting in a ₹34-crore relief package

Patil played a role in the enactment of the Maharashtra Anti-Superstition and Black Magic Act, 2013, alongside Justice Chandrashekhar Shankar Dharmadhikari and Dr. Narendra Dabholkar.

== OBC and Mandal Commission Movement ==
During the 1980s, while OBC leader Janardan Patil was leading struggles for social justice, Kapil Patil was actively involved as a student and organizer. Along with Shabbir Ansari, he travelled extensively across Maharashtra, working among OBC caste and community organizations.

He co-authored and published two books with Janardan Patil titled “Mandal Commission: The OBC Manifesto,” considered among the earliest publications in Maharashtra focusing on the Mandal Commission and OBC issues. He also organized statewide meetings and conferences advocating for the implementation of the Mandal Commission recommendations and reservation policies.

In 1984, he played a key role in the formation of Muslim OBC organizations, working alongside Shabbir Ansari and with encouragement from actor Dilip Kumar to promote awareness and organization among Muslim OBC communities.

He opposed the Maharashtra University bill allowing private universities in the Maharashtra Legislative Council until provisions for SC, ST, and OBC reservations were included.

== Journalism and Publications ==
Kapil Patil worked as a journalist and editor with newspapers such as Aapla Mahanagar, Sakal, Lokmat and Editor of Aaj Dinank, Sanj Dinank & Lokmudra. His published and edited works include:

- Ragdarbari – a collection of political essays
- Ayudh – a collection of select speeches delivered in the Maharashtra Legislative Council
- Editor, Desh-Mukhi – a compilation of notable speeches by former Chief Minister and Union Minister Vilasrao Deshmukh

== Political career ==
Kapil Patil founded the political party Lok Bharati, which merged with the Janata Dal (United) in 2017. He was appointed National General Secretary of Janata Dal (United) in 2022 and was assigned charge of the party’s affairs in Gujarat and Goa.

Patil was featured in I.N.D.I.A alliance meetings and linked in media to promotion of Nitish Kumar as a national leader. He has a reputation as JD(U)’s “Maharashtra face” and has been seen with Nitish Kumar at national meetings.

Kapil Patil was elected three times from the Mumbai Teachers constituency, remaining the only socialist representative in the Maharashtra Legislative Council for 18 consecutive years.

== Awards & recognition ==
- Recipient of the Best Speech Award in the Maharashtra Legislative Council for 2007–08, presented by former President Pratibha Patil, and again for 2016–17, presented by the then Chief Minister of Maharashtra.
