= Mumbai Teachers constituency =

Legislative Council seat in Maharashtra, India

Mumbai Teachers constituency is one of 78 Legislative Council seats in Maharashtra. This constituency covers Mumbai City & Mumbai Suburban districts.

== Members of Legislative Council ==
Year	Member	Party
1994	Sanjivani Raykar	Indian National Congress
2000	Sanjivani Raykar	Independent
2006	Kapil Patil	Independent
2012	Kapil Patil	Independent
2018	Kapil Patil	Independent
2024	Jagannath Abhyankar	Shiv Sena (UBT)
