= Dainik Hindusthan =

Indian Marathi-language daily newspaper

- Native name: दैनिक हिंदुस्तान
- Type: Daily newspaper
- Format: Broadsheet
- Founder: Balkrishana Vishnu Marathe
- Founded: 1947
- Language: Marathi
- Headquarters: Khaparde Garden, Amravati, Maharashtra, India
- RNI: 11420/1957
- Website: dainikhindusthan.com

Dainik Hindusthan is an Indian Marathi daily newspaper headquartered in Amravati, Maharashtra. Established in 1947 by Balkrishana Vishnu Marathe, it is one of the post-independence regional newspapers published in the Vidarbha region.

== History ==
Dainik Hindusthan was founded in 1947 in Amravati, Maharashtra, by Balkrishana Vishnu Marathe, also known as Balasaheb Marathe. A December 2025 retrospective published by Sanwad Media described the newspaper's continuation under his son Arun Marathe and subsequent members of the Marathe family. The retrospective identified Ulhas Marathe as chief editor and Vilas Marathe as managing editor.

The newspaper was an early workplace of B. T. Deshmukh, a journalist, academic and politician who began working there in 1957. Deshmukh subsequently became a professor and served in the Maharashtra Legislative Council, representing the Amravati Graduates constituency.

In August 2024, Dainik Hindusthan held its Amrut Mahotsav (75-year anniversary) celebrations at the Hanuman Vyayam Prasarak Mandal in Amravati. The event was attended by Union minister Nitin Gadkari, Lokmat Media Group editorial chairman Vijay Darda, Indian Newspaper Society president Rakesh Sharma and other representatives of the newspaper industry. Discussions at the event addressed the financial challenges facing regional newspapers, government advertising and the role of print journalism.

In September 2025, Vilas A. Marathe of Dainik Hindusthan was elected to the Executive Committee of the Indian Newspaper Society for the 2025–26 term.

== Availability and format ==
The newspaper is published in the Marathi language in broadsheet format. In addition to physical print distribution in Amravati and surrounding districts of Vidarbha, the paper distributes digital editions through its online portal and third-party e-paper platforms.

Government of India advertising records document the newspaper's inclusion in official advertising allocations in both 2010–11 and 2022–23. The Ministry of Information and Broadcasting's 2010–11 report recorded 43,741.40 column-centimetres of advertising space and expenditure of ₹758,450 for Dainik Hindusthan in Amravati. Its 2022–23 report listed the newspaper under publication identifier 200027, recording 25 advertisements, 16,261 units of advertising space and expenditure of ₹244,832.

== Recognition ==
Arun Marathe, a former editor of Dainik Hindusthan, received the Balshastri Jambhekar Darpan Award for journalism on 25 June 1995. The award is named in honour of Balshastri Jambhekar, a pioneer of Marathi journalism.

On 27 January 2022, Dainik Hindusthan hosted a Darpan Award presentation at its office in Amravati for Anil Agarwal, editor of Dainik Amravati Mandal and Dainik Matrubhumi. The ceremony was attended by Maharashtra minister Yashomati Chandrakant Thakur and representatives of the regional newspaper industry. Agarwal recalled that he had visited the newspaper's office to congratulate Arun Marathe on receiving the same award in 1995.

== See also ==
- List of Marathi-language newspapers
- List of newspapers in India
