= Ambadas Danve =

Member of the Maharashtra Legislative Council

Leader of the Opposition Maharashtra Legislative Council
- In office 9 August 2022 – 29 August 2025
- Chief Minister: Eknath Shinde; Devendra Fadnavis
- Preceded by: Pravin Darekar
- Succeeded by: Vacant (Note: No leader of opposition because no political party obtained at least 10% of the seats in the assembly.)

Member of Maharashtra Legislative Council
- Incumbent
- Assumed office 14 May 2026
- Preceded by: Uddhav Thackeray
- Constituency: Elected by MLAs
- In office 30 August 2019 – 29 August 2025
- Preceded by: Subhash Zambad
- Succeeded by: suhas Shirsath
- Constituency: Aurangabad-Jalna Local Authorities

Personal details
- Party: Shiv Sena (UBT)
- Profession: Politician

Ambadas Eknathrao Danve is an Indian politician and leader of Shiv Sena from Maharashtra. He was a former Leader of Opposition in Maharashtra Legislative Council. He is a former member of the Maharashtra Legislative Council representing Aurangabad district, Maharashtra-Jalna district Local Authorities constituency.

== Career ==
He was born to Eknathrao Danve, who was employed by the Maharashtra State Road Transport Corporation (MSRTC). Danve's political career began with his association with the Rashtriya Swayamsevak Sangh (RSS), the Bharatiya Janata Party, and its youth wing, the Bharatiya Janata Yuva Morcha.

In 2000, Ambadas Danve won the municipal elections as a candidate of Shiv Sena from Ajabnagar in Aurangabad city. In 2019, he was elected as a Member of the Maharashtra Legislative Council, representing the Aurangabad-Jalana Local Authorities constituency.

== Positions held ==
Year	Position	Notes
2000	Corporator of Aurangabad Municipal Corporation	Elected as a Sena nominee from Ajabnagar
2011	Aurangabad Zhila Pramukh	Appointed to the post
2019	Member of Maharashtra Legislative Council	Elected from Aurangabad -Jalna Local Authorities constituency
2026	Member of Maharashtra Legislative Council	Elected from MLAs

== See also ==
- List of members of the Maharashtra Legislative Council
