= Madhu Deolekar =

Indian politician

Member of the Maharashtra Legislative Council
- In office 1978–1988

Personal details
- Born: 1932
- Died: 12 June 2024 (aged 92) Mumbai, India
- Party: Bharatiya Janata Party
- Occupation: Politician

Madhu Deolekar (1932 – 12 June 2024) (Hindi: मधु देओलेकर) was a BJP politician from the state of Maharashtra. Deolekar was a member of the Maharashtra Legislative Council from 1978 to 1988.

Deolekar was closely associated with the Rashtriya Swayamsevak Sangh (RSS), Jan Sangh, and later the BJP, where he held the position of party general secretary for the Mumbai unit. He died at the age of 92 on 12 June 2024.

In addition to his political career, Deolekar was an independent journalist and a lawyer. During the Emergency in 1975, he was involved in publishing underground literature and actively participated in the opposition movement against the government's authoritarian measures. He authored several books, including "Vidnyannisth Shri Guruji," published in Marathi in 2020.
