= Abhijit Wanjarri =

Indian politician

Abhijit Wanjari

Member of Maharashtra Legislative Council
- Incumbent
- Assumed office 2020 - Present
- Preceded by: Anil Sole
- Constituency: Nagpur Graduates constituency

Personal details
- Born: 10 May 1973 (age 53) Nagpur, Maharashtra
- Party: Indian National Congress
- Website: http://abhijitwanjari.com/

Abhijitdada Govindrao Wanjari (born 10 May 1973) is a leader of Indian National Congress and member of Maharashtra Legislative Council from Nagpur division Graduates Constituency. He won the Nagpur division graduates' constituency election of the Maharashtra Legislative Council and defeated BJP candidate Sandip Joshi by a margin of 18,910 votes.

== Early life and education ==
Abhijit Govindrao Wanjari was born in Nagpur, Maharashtra, India. His father Late Shri. Govindrao Marotrao Wanjari, was a well known politician & twice MLA from Nagpur South constituency and was member of Congress Party from 1955. He has completed his B.A. LLB from Nagpur University during which he was the general secretary of State National Students' Union of India (NSUI) from 1998 to 2002. He also served as the General Secretary and Spokesperson of the Nagpur district Congress Committee.

== Political career ==
- Contested Nagpur Division Graduates' Constituency Election: As Maha Vikas Aghadi candidate from Nagpur Division Graduates' Constituency in 2026 & secured 67,231 votes. Currently, he is the MLC from Nagpur Division Graduates' Constituency.[6]
- Contested Nagpur Division Graduates' Constituency Election: As Maha Vikas Aghadi candidate from Nagpur Division Graduates' Constituency in 2020 & secured 61,701 votes.
- Contested Assembly Election: As Congress Party candidate from East Nagpur – 54, Constituency in 2014 & secured 50, 524 votes.
- Contested Assembly Election: In January 2005 as a candidate from South Nagpur Constituency in By-Election & secured 19,153 votes.
- Ex. Secretary: Maharashtra Pradesh Youth Congress.
- Ex. General Secretary: Maharashtra Pradesh NSUI.
- Contested Municipal Corporation Election: As a Congress candidate & secured 3,751 votes.
- Ex. Vice-Chairman: Youth and Sports Cell, (M.P.C.C.).
- General Secretary & Spokesperson: Nagpur District Congress Committee.
- Election Observer: Uttar Pradesh & Bihar, Gondia, Tiroda.

Other positions:

- Member: Management Council RTM Nagpur University.
- Senate Member: Nagpur RTM Nagpur University from Graduate Constituency.
- Secretary: Amar Sewa Mandal, Nagpur an Education Society running 10 Colleges (Engineering, Pharmacy, Law Management, Computer Tech., Education, Science, Commerce and Arts) in Nagpur Region.
- Chairman: Govind Urban Credit Co-op. Society Ltd., Nagpur.

Social work:

- Secretary: Govindrao Wanjari Foundation engaged in social activities like Blood donation Camp, Health Camp, Eye-check-up Camp, Social Awareness Camp, Tree Plantation.

== Personal life ==
Adv. Abhijit Wanjarri is married to Smeetaa A. Wanjarri who is senate member in Rashtrasant Tukadoji Maharaj Nagpur University and also a lecturer in English. The couple have a daughter and a son studying in school.

== Awards and recognitions ==
- 2014: – Abhijit Wanjarri had received prestigious business ICON in coffee book table award of Lokmat group of newspapers in the category of education.
