= Prabhakar Sanzgiri =

Indian politician

Prabhakar Sanzgiri (died 9 March 2009 in Vikhroli) was a communist politician, trade union organiser and newspaper editor from Maharashtra, India. He served as secretary of the Maharashtra State Committee of the Communist Party of India (Marxist), vice-president of the Centre of Indian Trade Unions, Maharashtra State Committee president of CITU and editor of the Marathi party organ Jeevan Marg.

Prabhakar Sanzgiri is a descendant of Sanzgiris of Morjim-Goa

Sanzgiri became a leftwing activist during his student days, joining the struggle against British rule in India. After Independence, he took active part in the Samyukta Maharashtra movement. During the years to come, Sanzgiri was jailed several times due to his political activism. He was again jailed during The Emergency.

Following the end of The Emergency, Sanzgiri was elected to the Maharashtra Legislative Assembly from Bhandup in 1978. His candidature was supported by various other opposition parties. In 1980 elections, he was the losing candidate in Bhandup seat. After his tenure in the Legislative Assembly, he was elected to the Maharashtra Legislative Council.

Sanzgiri was active in building a base of CITU, the trade union centre linked to CPI(M), in Bhandup, especially amongst the tyre-factory workers of CEAT Limited. During his lifetime, Sanzgiri authored many books, such as Anuchya Antarangat, Manavachi Kahani, Charvaka Te Marx and Dr Ambedkar: A Marxist evaluation. In 2008, he resigned as editor of Jeevan Marg.

Prabhakar Sanzgiri died on 9 March 2009, at his residence in suburban Vikhroli. He had resigned from his post as Maharashtra State Committee Secretary of the party two years earlier, due to ill health. His wife and fellow CPI(M) leader, Suman Sanzgiri, has written a biography on his political career, titled Lal Chhayet Kranticha Shodh.
