= Vikrant Patil =

Indian politician

Member of Maharashtra Legislative Council
- Incumbent
- Assumed office 16 October 2024
- Governor: C. P. Radhakrishnan
- Constituency: Nominated

Personal details
- Born: 12 July 1984 (age 41)
- Party: Bhartiya Janata Party
- Website: vikrantpatil.in//

Vikrant Patil (born 1984) is an Indian politician from Maharashtra. He is a nominated member of the Maharashtra Legislative Council representing Bhartiya Janata Party. He was a former deputy mayor of Panvel Municipal Corporation in Maharashtra and also Maharashtra state president of Bhartiya Janata Yuva Morcha, a youth wing of BJP.

== Positions held ==
- 2018 - Deputy mayor of Panvel Municipal Corporation
- 2020 - President, BJYM Maharashtra state
- 2022 - State general secretary BJP, Maharashtra
- 2024 - Member of the Maharashtra Legislative Council
