= Manisha Kayande =

Indian politician

Dr. Manisha Kayande

Member of Legislative Council of Maharashtra
- Incumbent
- Assumed office 16 October 2018
- Preceded by: Sunil Tatkare, Nationalist Congress Party

Personal details
- Party: Shiv Sena
- Occupation: Politician

Dr. Manisha Kayande is an Indian politician and member of Shiv Sena from Maharashtra. She is a member of Maharashtra Legislative Council. Earlier, she was with BJP and was their losing candidate in the 2009 assembly elections for the Sion Koliwada seat.

== Positions held ==
- 2016: Appointed spokesperson of Shiv Sena
- 2018: Elected to Maharashtra Legislative Council
- 2024:Elected to Maharashtra Legislative Council

== See also ==
- List of members of the Maharashtra Legislative Council
