= Amravati Graduates constituency =

Constituency of the Maharashtra Legislative Council

Amravati Graduates constituency is one of 78 Legislative Council seats in Maharashtra. This constituency encompasses the entire Amravati division, which includes the districts of Amravati, Akola, Buldhana, Yavatmal and Washim.

== Members of Legislative Council ==
Year	Member	Party
1980	Prof. B. T. Deshmukh	Independent politician
1986	Prof. B. T. Deshmukh	Independent politician
1992	Prof. B. T. Deshmukh	Independent politician
1998	Prof. B. T. Deshmukh	Independent politician
2004	Prof. B. T. Deshmukh	Independent politician
2010	Ranjit Patil	Bharatiya Janata Party
2017	Ranjit Patil	Bharatiya Janata Party
2023	Dhiraj Lingade	Indian National Congress
