= Wajahat Ather Mirza =

Indian politician

Wajahat Mirza
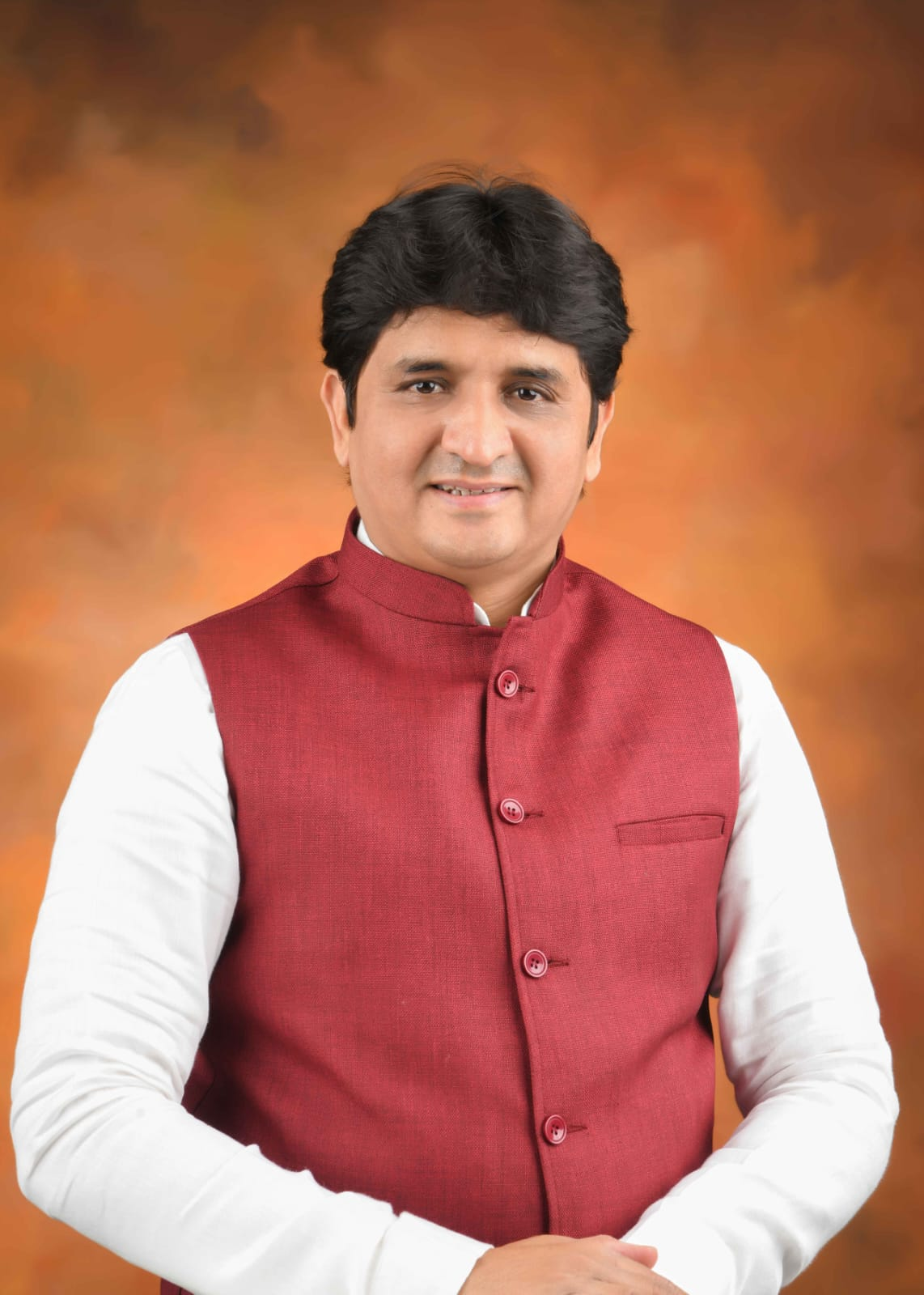

Member of the Maharashtra Legislative Council
- In office 27 July 2018 – 27 July 2024
- Governor: C. Vidyasagar Rao; Bhagat Singh Koshyari
- Chairman: Ramraje Naik Nimbalkar
- Constituency: elected by members of legislative assembly

Chairman of Maharashtra state Waqf Board (Minister of State Status)
- In office 26 Nov 2021 – 27 July 2024
- Preceded by: Mahemud Mahebub Shaikh
- Succeeded by: Sameer Gulamnabi Kazi

President of Indian National Congress Yavatmal district
- In office May 2018 – May 2022
- Preceded by: Wamanrao Bapurao Kasawar
- Succeeded by: Praful Mankar

Personal details
- Born: September 21, 1975 (age 50)
- Party: Indian National Congress

Wajahat Ather Mirza is an Indian politician who is currently serving as a member of the Maharashtra Legislative Assembly since 10 July 2018. Representing the Indian National Congress, he was elected unopposed with 10 others to the Maharashtra Legislative Council.
