= B. T. Deshmukh =

Indian politician

Bhaurao Tulsiramji Deshmukh (21 August 1939 – 19 June 2026), also known as B. T. Deshmukh, was an Indian politician, educationist and activist from Maharashtra. He served as a Member of the Maharashtra Legislative Council (MLC) for five consecutive terms, representing the Amravati Graduates constituency from 1980 to 2010. During his tenure, he advocated for the rights of teachers and campaigned regarding water scarcity and regional development in the Vidarbha region, leading to his supporters referring to him as the "Maharshi of Irrigation Backlog Eradication."

== Personal life ==
Deshmukh was born into a family of farmers on 21 August 1939, in the village of Belora, near Chandurbazar in Maharashtra's Amravati district. He received his higher education at Vidarbha Mahavidyalaya in Amravati, which was affiliated with Nagpur University. He completed his Bachelor of Arts (BA) in 1962 and his Master of Arts (MA) in Political Science in 1964. He has two daughters.

He suffered a heart attack in the lobby of the Maharashtra Legislative Council in 2001 as he was leaving after discussing farmer suicides in the house. Deshmukh died after another heart attack on 19 June 2026 at the age of 87. His death was condoled by Devendra Fadnavis, the then Chief Minister of Maharashtra; Nitin Gadkari, the then Union Minister of Road Transport and Highways; and other political leaders from Maharashtra.

== Academic and political career ==
Deshmukh began his journalism career in 1957 at Dainik Hindusthan, a Marathi-language daily newspaper published in Amravati.

Deshmukh began his career as a lecturer of political science at Shri Shivaji College of Arts and Commerce in Amravati. In 1974 he became the President of the Nagpur University Teachers' Association (NUTA). He campaigned for improved and regular pay and living standards for professors.

Deshmukh represented the Amravati Graduates’ Constituency in the Maharashtra Legislative Council for five consecutive terms (1980 to 2010). While a member of the Legislative Council, he annually presented the budget of his MLC's development fund to the public for accountability. He advocated for infrastructure development, road construction and irrigation projects in the Vidarbha region. He has been credited with accelerating the Upper Wardha Dam project, which reduced water shortages in Amravati city. He later wrote a book on the water crisis in Vidarbha. He was noted for his opposition to the politicisation of graduates' and teachers' constituencies in the Legislative Council.

Deshmukh's political career ended following his defeat by the Bharatiya Janata Party's candidate Ranjit Patil in the 2010 MLC election.
