= Deepak Sawant =

Indian politician

Dr. Deepak Sawant

Minister of Public Health Government of Maharashtra
- In office 5 December 2014 – 7 January 2019
- Chief Minister: Devendra Fadnavis
- Succeeded by: Eknath Shinde

Member of Maharashtra Legislative Council
- In office 2006–2018
- Succeeded by: Vilas Potnis
- Constituency: Mumbai Graduate constituency

Personal details
- Party: Shiv Sena
- Occupation: Politician
- Website: Official Website

Deepak Sawant is a member of Maharashtra Legislative Council, belonging to the Shiv Sena. He represents the Mumbai graduate constituency. He was elected to office in July, 2006 for a term of six years and then reelected in July 2012. However he was denied a spot on the ticket in his third election bid. He was appointed Maharashtra's cabinet minister of in December, 2014 with the portfolio Public Health and Family Welfare. Later in the same month, he was also given responsibility of being guardian minister of Bhandara district and Dharashiv District. In June 2023 he was appointed as Head of Task Force to eradicate Malnutrition in tribal areas of Maharashtra State.

== Positions held ==
- 2004: Elected to Maharashtra Legislative Council
- 2006: Re-Elected to Maharashtra Legislative Council
- 2012: Re-Elected to Maharashtra Legislative Council
- 2014: Cabinet Minister of Public Health and Family Welfare (Marathi: सार्वजनिक आरोग्य आणि कुटुंब कल्याण) in Maharashtra State Government
- 2014: Guardian minister of Bhandara district, Osmanabad District and Aurangabad District
- 2023: Head of Task Force to eradicate Malnutrition in Maharashtra State.

== See also ==
- Devendra Fadnavis ministry

Political offices
Preceded by	Cabinet Minister for Public Health and Family Welfare, Maharashtra State; December 2014–present	Incumbent
Preceded by	Maharashtra State Guardian Minister for Bhandara district December 2014–present	Incumbent
Preceded by	Maharashtra State Guardian Minister for Osmanabad district December 2014–present	Incumbent
