= Parinay Fuke =

Indian politician

Dr. Parinay Fuke

Member of Maharashtra Legislative Council
- Incumbent
- Assumed office 28 July 2024
- Constituency: Elected by MLAs
- In office 6 December 2016 – 5 December 2022
- Preceded by: Rajendra Jain
- Constituency: Bhandara-Gondia Local Authorities

Minister of state Government of Maharashtra
- In office 16 June 2019 – 8 November 2019
- Chief Minister: Devendra Fadnavis
- Department: Public Works Department, Forest, Tribal Development

Personal details
- Born: 5 January 1981 (age 45) Nagpur, Maharashtra, India
- Party: Bharatiya Janata Party
- Spouse: Parinita Fuke
- Children: Ramniclala
- Education: MBA, PhD.
- Occupation: Politician

Dr. Parinay Fuke (born 5 January 1981) also known as Parinay Ramesh Fuke Patil is a member of Maharashtra Legislative Council from Bhandara-Gondiya Local Authorities, belonging to the Bharatiya Janata Party elected as Member of Legislative Council from Bhandara-Gondia Constituency and former Minister of Maharashtra State in First Fadnavis ministry.

== Education ==
Fuke attended Nagpur University for his PhD.

== Political career ==
Parinay Fuke is a member of the Rashtriya Swayamsevak Sangh (RSS), a far-right Hindu nationalist paramilitary volunteer organisation.

Fuke won Nagpur Municipal Corporation Election independently in 2007 with 4,000 margin of votes. Appointed as Member of Legislative Council Member by Governor of Maharashtra.

=== Positions held ===
==== Within BJP ====
- Vice president, Nagpur BJP
- Corporator, Nagpur Municipal Corporation- Independent 2007

==== Legislative ====
- Member, Maharashtra Legislative Council since 5 December 2016
- In 2019 Maharashtra Legislative Assembly election he lost to Nana Patole from Sakoli Vidhan Sabha Seat by a Narrow Margin of 6,240 Votes.
