= Dhule–Nandurbar Local Authorities constituency =

Dhule–Nandurbar Local Authorities constituency is one of 78 Legislative Council seats in Maharashtra. This constituency covers Dhule & Nandurbar districts.

== Members of Legislative Council ==
Year	Member	Party
1998	Chandrakant Raghuwanshi	Indian National Congress
2004	Chandrakant Raghuwanshi	Indian National Congress
2010	Amrish Patel	Indian National Congress
2016	Amrish Patel	Indian National Congress
2020^	Amrish Patel	Bharatiya Janata Party
2022	Amrish Patel	Bharatiya Janata Party

^ - bypoll
