= Anil Shivajirao Bhosale =

Indian politician

Member of Legislative Council of Maharashtra
- In office 6 December 2010 – 20 feb 2016
- Preceded by: Laxman jagtab
- Constituency: Pune Local Areas Constituency
- In office 15 may 2016 – 10 may 2022

Personal details
- Born: 11 November 1964 (age 61)
- Party: NCP
- Spouse: Reshma Anil Bhosale
- Children: 3 children - Devika Kakade Bhosale, Revati Bhosale and Jaywardhan Bhosale

Anil Shivajirao Bhosale is a politician of the Nationalist Congress Party. On 23 November 2016 he was re-elected to the Maharashtra Legislative Council from Local Areas Constituency of Pune. He was representing the same seat from 2010 to 2016 as well. On 25 February 2020, Bhosale along with three others was arrested in connection with embezzlement of ₹4.94 billion (US$65.3 million) at Shivajirao Bhosale cooperative bank. Bhosale was chairman and director of the bank at time of his arrest.
