= Nagpur Graduates constituency =

Constituency of the Maharashtra Legislative Council

Nagpur Graduates constituency is one of 78 Legislative Council seats in Maharashtra. This constituency encompasses the entire Nagpur division, which includes the districts of Nagpur, Wardha, Bhandara, Gondia, Chandrapur and Gadchiroli.

== Members of Legislative Council ==
Year	Member	Party
1978	Gangadhar Fadnavis	Janata Party
1984	Gangadhar Fadnavis	Bharatiya Janata Party
1990	Nitin Gadkari	Bharatiya Janata Party
1996	Nitin Gadkari	Bharatiya Janata Party
2002	Nitin Gadkari	Bharatiya Janata Party
2008	Nitin Gadkari	Bharatiya Janata Party
2014	Anil Sole	Bharatiya Janata Party
2020	Abhijit Wanjarri	Indian National Congress
2026	Abhijit Wanjarri	Indian National Congress
