= Pravin Pote =

Indian politician

Pravin Pote Patil

Member of Maharashtra Legislative Council
- Incumbent
- Assumed office 22 June 2026
- Constituency: Amravati Local Authorities
- In office (2012-2018), (2018 – 2024)
- Preceded by: Jagdish Gupta
- Constituency: Amravati Local Authorities

Minister of State Government of Maharashtra
- In office 5 December 2014 – 16 June 2019
- Chief Minister: Devendra Fadnavis
- Department: Industries; Mining; Environment; Public Works

Personal details
- Born: Pravin Ramchandra Pote; 6 November 1968 (age 57) Amravati, Dist.Amravati District
- Party: Bharatiya Janata Party
- Website: http://pravinpotepatil.in/

Pravin Ramchandra Pote Patil known as P. R. Pote Patil is a member of Maharashtra Legislative Council, belonging to the Bharatiya Janata Party. He represents the Amravati local body constituency. He was appointed Maharashtra's Minister of State in December, 2014 with the portfolio Industries and Mining, Environment, Public Works (excluding public undertaking). Later in the same month, he was also given responsibility of being guardian minister of Amravati district.

Political offices
| Preceded by | Minister of State for Industries & Mining, Public Works, Environment; Maharashtra State; December 2014–present | Incumbent |
| Preceded by | Maharashtra State Guardian Minister for Amravati district December 2014–present | Incumbent |
