= Satish Chavan =

Indian politician

S. B. Chavan

Member of Maharashtra Legislative Council
- Incumbent
- Assumed office 4 December 2020
- Constituency: S, Nagar Graduate's Constituency
- In office 2014–2020
- Constituency: Aurangabad Graduate's Constituency
- In office 2008–2014
- Constituency: Graduate's Constituency

Secretary of Marathwada Shikshan Prasarak Mandal
- Incumbent
- Assumed office 2008

Personal details
- Born: 26 January 1962 (age 64) Umarga, Osmanabad, Maharashtra
- Citizenship: Indian
- Party: Nationalist Congress Party
- Spouse: Asha
- Children: Supriya & Akshay
- Education: B.E. Mechanical in 1983
- Profession: Politician
- Website: www.satishchavan.in

Satish Bhanudasrao Chavan (born 26 January 1962) is an Indian politician from Nationalist Congress Party. He is a Member of Legislative Council of Maharashtra. He has served two terms from 2008 to 2020.

== Early life ==
Chavan was born on 26 January 1962 in a Maratha family. His father was a farmer. He completed his B.E. in Mechanical Engineering.

== Positions held ==
- Member of Maharashtra Legislative Council – 2008–2014
- Member of Maharashtra Legislative Council – 2014–2020
- Member of Maharashtra Legislative Council – 2020–2026
- Secretary – Marathwada Shikshan Prasarak Mandal, Aurangabad
