= Prasad Lad =

Indian politician

Member of Maharashtra Legislative Council
- Incumbent
- Assumed office 7 December 2017
- Preceded by: Narayan Rane
- Constituency: MLA's quota

Personal details
- Party: Bharatiya Janata Party
- Other political affiliations: Nationalist Congress Party

Prasad Lad is an Indian politician who is a leader of the BJP. He is also the Vice President for the BJP Maharashtra state unit. After Narayan Rane resigned as MLC after leaving the Indian National Congress, Prasad Lad defeated Dileep Mane of the Indian National Congress party by garnering 209 votes to win the bypoll for the seat. Nine Congress and Nationalist Congress Party MLA's cross voted for the BJP candidate.
