= Viplav Bajoria =

Indian politician

Member of Maharashtra Legislative Council
- In office 22 June 2018 – 21 June 2024
- Preceded by: Babajani Durrani
- Constituency: Parbhani-Hingoli Local Authorities Constituency

Personal details
- Party: Shiv Sena (2022–present)
- Parent: Gopikishan Bajoria (father)
- Education: Kishinchand Chellaram College; University of Mumbai

Viplav Gopikishan Bajoria (born 15 March 1986) is an Indian politician representing Parbhani-Hingoli Local Authority in the Maharashtra Legislative Council. At his election in May 2018, he became the youngest member of Legislative Council in the country. Bajoria also serves as the director of Janata Commercial Co-operative Bank.

== Positions held ==
- 2018: Elected to Maharashtra Legislative Council
