= Ramesh More =

Indian politician

Member of Maharashtra Legislative Council

Personal details
- Died: 1993 Andheri, Bombay, India
- Party: Shiv Sena

Ramesh More (died 1993) was a Shiv Sena politician and a well-known trade union leader from Bombay, India. He served as a Member of the Maharashtra Legislative Council. He also served as the General Secretary of Bhartiya Kamgar Sena (BKS), a trade union.

His name also appeared in the 1993 Bombay riots.

He was shot dead in 1993 in Bombay's Andheri suburb.

An article published in 2000 by the CPIM's The Marxist wrote, Even before the SS-BJP had come to power, some of their MLAs and corporators had been killed as a result of their involvement with mafia gangs and shady rackets concerning land, property or extortion. These included SS MLAs Vithal Chavan and Ramesh More, SS corporators Vinayak Wable and Khimbahadur Thapa, BJP MLA Prem Kumar Sharma and BJP corporator, Ex-MLA and its city president Ramdas Nayak.
