= Ravindra Mirlekar =

Indian politician

Member of Legislative Council of Maharashtra
- In office 1996–2002

Personal details
- Party: Shiv Sena
- Occupation: Politician

Ravindra Mirlekar is an Indian politician and leader of Shiv Sena from Maharashtra. He was member of Maharashtra Legislative Council from 1996 to 2002.

== Positions held ==
- 1996: Elected to Maharashtra Legislative Council
- 2005 Onwards: Deputy Leader, Shiv Sena
- 2013-2015: Shiv Sena Sampark Pramukh Nashik
- 2015: Shiv Sena Sampark Pramukh Jalgaon, Dhule

== See also ==
- List of members of the Maharashtra Legislative Council
