= Amarnath Rajurkar =

Indian politician

Member of Legislative Council of Maharashtra
- In office 6 December 2010 – 6 December 2022
- Constituency: Nanded Local Areas Constituency

Personal details
- Party: Bharatiya Janata Party (BJP) (since 2024)
- Other political affiliations: Indian National Congress (INC) (until 2024)

Amarnath Anantrao Rajurkar is a politician of the Indian National Congress. On 23 November 2016 he was re-elected to the Maharashtra Legislative Council from Local Areas Constituency of Nanded. Of total 472 voters, Mr Rajurkar secured 251 whereas his only rival Mr Shinde, the former government officer, got 208 votes. He served one term as MLC from 2010 - 2016. He is President of Nanded City Congress Committee. On 12 February 2024, he resigned from the primary membership of Indian National Congress Party (INC) along with Ashok Chavan. On 13 February 2024 he joined the Bharatiya Janata Party (BJP) along with Ashok Chavan.

== Political career ==
- Member of Legislative council (2010–present)
