= Chitra Wagh =

Indian politician

Chitra Kishor Wagh

Member of Maharashtra Legislative Council
- Incumbent
- Assumed office 16 October 2024
- Governor: C. P. Radhakrishnan

Personal details
- Born: 16 February 1975 (age 51) Mumbai, Maharashtra, India
- Party: Bhartiya Janata Party
- Occupation: Politician

Chitra Kishor Wagh is an Indian politician serving as a Member of the Maharashtra Legislative Council (MLC). She is a senior leader within the Bharatiya Janata Party (BJP), holding the position of president of its women’s wing, the Maharashtra Pradesh Mahila Morcha.

== Early Life and Family ==
Wagh was born in Mumbai, Maharashtra. She completed her education in Mumbai and Nashik. She is married to Kishor Wagh.
