= Vikram Vasantrao Kale =

Indian politician

Member of Maharashtra Legislative Council
- Incumbent
- Assumed office 6 January 2010
- Constituency: Auranagabad teachers

Personal details
- Born: 01 July Palsap, Osmanabad, Maharashtra, India
- Citizenship: India
- Party: Nationalist Congress Party
- Education: Bachelor of Arts and Education
- Alma mater: Dr. Babasaheb Ambedkar Marathwada university, Aurangabad, Maharashtra, India
- Occupation: Politician

Vikram Vasantrao Kale is an Indian politician who is current member of Maharashtra Legislative Council.

== Personal life ==
Kale was born in Palsap village in Osmanabad district present day Maharashtra. After completing his school education, he went to Dr. B.R. Ambedkar Marathwada university to study education.

He married Shubhangi in 1999 and has two daughters Nishigandha and Sanjana. He has one brother Anil and two sisters Usha and Kranti.

== Political career ==
He was member of Maharashtra Legislative Council from 6 January 2010 to 5 December 2016.

Again he was elected for second term on 8 February 2017 from Auranagabad teachers constituency.
