= Ramesh Patil =

Indian politician

Ramesh Narayan Patil

Member of Maharashtra Legislative Council Maharashtra
- Incumbent
- Assumed office 27 July 2018

Personal details
- Party: Bharatiya Janata Party

Ramesh Narayan Patil is an Indian politician and belongs to the Bharatiya Janata Party. On 10 July 2018, he was elected unopposed with 10 others to the Maharashtra Legislative Council.

Patil is President of the Koli Mahasangh, an organisation established to advocate for the interests of Koli people.

== See also ==
- List of Koli people
