= Ranjit Patil =

Indian politician

Minister of State Home(Urban), Urban Development, Skill Development and Entrepreneurship, Law & Judiciary, Parliamentary affairs Government of Maharashtra
- In office 8 December 2014 – 2019
- Governor: C. Vidyasagar Rao

Member of Legislative Council of Maharashtra
- In office (2010–2016), (2017 – 2023)
- Preceded by: B. T. Deshmukh
- Succeeded by: Dhiraj Lingade
- Constituency: Amravati Graduates constituency

Personal details
- Born: 20 January 1964 (age 62) Akola, Maharashtra, India
- Party: Bharatiya Janata Party
- Spouse(s): Dr Aparna Patil (MBBS, DGO)
- Children: Kashmira Sarnaik Patil (daughter); Sharva Patil (son)
- Parent: Vitthalrao Patil (Ex-MLC) Akola (father)
- Relatives: Purvesh Pratap Sarnaik (Son-in-Law)
- Education: MBBS and MS (Ortho) from Government Medical College Nagpur
- Occupation: Politician

Ranjit Vitthalrao Patil (born 20 January 1964) is a member of Maharashtra Legislative Council, belonging to the Bharatiya Janata Party and was State General Secretary Maharashtra Unit. He represents the Amravati graduate constituency. He was appointed Maharashtra's Minister of State in December, 2014 with the portfolio Home (Urban), Urban Development, General Administration, Law and Judiciary and Parliamentary Affairs. Later in the same month, he was also given responsibility of being guardian minister of Akola district and Washim district. He has completed 2 terms as an MLC .

== Early life ==
Patil was born to Sulochanadevi Patil and Vitthalrao Patil, who was then a member of Maharashtra Legislative Council from Akola.

== Education and early career ==
Patil also has a post-graduate degree in MBBS and MS (Ortho) from Government Medical College, Nagpur. He is a leading Orthopedic surgeon in Akola at Vitthal hospital. He is well known for the same in the neighbouring districts as well.

== Family and personal life ==
Ranjit Patil is second in age among the four brothers. All his brothers are well qualified. His elder brother Rajendra Patil is principal of a renowned college of Akola, His younger brother Randhir Patil is a prominent business man of Akola, his youngest brother Nitin Patil is one of the most successful farmers of the district. His only daughter Kashmira is married to Purvesh Sarnaik, Son of Shiv Sena leader & MLA Pratap Sarnaik

== Political career ==
=== Positions held ===
==== Within BJP ====
- Vice President, Medical Wing Maharashtra BJP (2007–2012)
- President, Medical Wing Akola BJP
- Prabhari, West Vidarbha (Medical Wing)
- General Secretary, BJP, Maharashtra (2012)

==== Legislative ====
- Member, Maharashtra Legislative Council

Political offices
Preceded by	Minister of State(MoS) for Home, Urban Development, Law and Judiciary; Maharashtra State; 2014–present	Incumbent
Preceded by	Maharashtra State Guardian Minister for Akola district 2014–present	Incumbent
