= Amit Gorkhe =

Indian politician (born 1980)

Amit Ganpat Gorkhe (born 4 November 1980) is an Indian politician who is a Member of Maharasthra Legislative Council. He is a member of the Bharatiya Janata Party and belongs to the Mang community. On 12 July 2024, he was elected as the Member of Maharasthra Legislative Council (MLC).
