= Anil Sole =

Indian politician

Member of Maharashtra Legislative Council
- In office 20 July 2014 – 19 July 2020
- Preceded by: Nitin Gadkari
- Succeeded by: Abhijit Wanjarri
- Constituency: Nagpur Graduates constituency

Mayor of Nagpur
- In office 5 March 2012 – 5 September 2014
- Preceded by: Archana Dehankar
- Succeeded by: Pravin Datke

President of Bharatiya Janata Party – Nagpur City
- In office 24 March 2010 – 24 March 2012
- President: Sudhir Mungantiwar
- Succeeded by: Krishna Khopde

Personal details
- Born: 19 September 1959 (age 66) Nagpur, Maharashtra, India
- Party: Bharatiya Janata Party
- Spouse: Ashwini Sole
- Occupation: Politician

Anil Sole (born 19 September 1959) is elected from Nagpur Graduate Constituency Maharashtra Legislative Council. He is a member of the Bharatiya Janata Party (BJP) & RSS and was also the president of the Nagpur City of the BJP and a MLC of Maharashtra.

His political career commenced in the early eighties, when he became President of the Bharatiya Janata Yuva Morcha (youth wing of the BJP) in Maharashtra. At the age of 33, Sole became the first time corporator of the Nagpur Municipal Corporation and served as corporator for five consecutive terms (including as Nominated Member), in 1992, 1997, 2002, 2007 and 2012.

He is also elected as the Vice President Mayor in Council of the State of Maharashtra in 2012. And President of the Mayor Councils of India 2014.

== Early life ==
Sole was born to Madhuri, and Madhukar-rao Sole.

His father, Madhukar-rao Sole, died of chronic health issues in 2015.

== Education and early career ==
Sole completed B.Sc. & M.Sc. (Mathematics) from Rashtrasant Tukadoji Maharaj Nagpur University.

He was inspired to join the student's movement by Late Dattaji Didolkar, since he was an active member of ABVP while in college. In the ABVP, he led the students of the region in various movements & agitations like Fee Hikes or Reforms in education. Then he exhibited his strength to shoulders the various responsibilities and took active party in University Elections.

== Family and personal life ==
Anil Sole married Ashwini. They have a two son named Vishal & Vipul.

== Political career ==
In 1992, at age 33, Sole was elected as a corporator. In 2012 he became Mayor of the Nagpur Municipal Corporation.

- In 2014 he was elected for the first time to the Maharashtra Legislative Council, Nagpur Division Graduate Constituency after Nitin Gadkari became Central Cabinet Minister of India.

== Mark on municipal governance ==
As First Citizen of the Nagpur City (2012–2014) made Popular Mayor of City. He played a key role in shaping the city as Green City with various movements & programs with NGO's of Nagpur City. Sole, with the help of his team, launched Tree Plantation campaign of planting 1Lacs Tree in a day. Famous river on whose name given to City "NAG RIVER" Cleaning Environment movement. His lasting efforts with team support from Councillors bring city various awards and nominations in Urban Development.

Sole has major achievements stands out in particular as Mayor of the City Nagpur, NAG River Renewable & Initiative for Save Energy Campaign for the City

== Achievements and awards ==
ABP News Awards --

- Best City for Health Care 2013
- Best City for Public Transport 2013
- Best City to Live 2013
- Best Green City 2013

India Today award for Most Entertaining City 2013

=== Positions held ===
==== Positions in Social Sphere ====
- Professor of Mathematics in VMV College Nagpur (1985–2011)
- President, Shikshak Sahakari Bank Ltd, Nagpur (2009)
- Re-elected President, Shikshak Sahakari Bank Ltd, Nagpur (2015)

==== Within BJP ====
- Nagpur President, BJYM (1984)
- Nagpur Municipal Corporation Opposition Party Leader, BJP (2007)
- Nagpur Municipal Corporation Ruling Party Leader, BJP (2007)
- Nagpur President, BJP (2010)

==== Legislative ====
- Mayor, Nagpur Municipal Corporation – (2012 to 2014)
- Member, Maharashtra Legislative Council, Nagpur Division Graduate Constituency - since 2014
