= Babajani Durrani =

Indian politician

- बाबाजानी दुर्रानी

Member of Maharashtra Legislative Council
- In office 10 July 2018 – July 2024
- Preceded by: Narendra Patil (NCP)

Member of Maharashtra Legislative Council
- In office 2012–2018
- Preceded by: Suresh Sakhabhau Deshmukh (INC)
- Succeeded by: Viplav Bajoria (Shiv Sena)
- Constituency: Parbhani-Hingoli Local Authorities Constituency

Member of Maharashtra Legislative Assembly
- In office 2004–2009
- Preceded by: Haribhau Lahane (Shiv Sena)
- Succeeded by: Mira Kalyanrao Renge (Shiv Sena)
- Constituency: Pathri

Personal details
- Born: Abdullah Khan Durrani
- Party: INC (2025- present) NCP(1999-2024)
- Spouse: Shaista Begum
- Children: 2 sons, 1 daughter
- Parent: Abdul Latif Khan Durrani (father)
- Occupation: Agriculture
- Known for: Confidant of Sharad Pawar

Abdullah "Babajani" Khan Durrani is an Indian politician from Pathri town of Maharashtra who belongs to the Nationalist Congress Party. Currently he is member of Maharashtra Legislative Council and Parbhani district president Nationalist Congress Party, he also served as a Member of Maharashtra Legislative Assembly from Pathri from 2004 to 2009. He previously represented the Parbhani-Hingoli Local Authorities constituency in the Maharashtra Legislative Council.

== Political profile ==
He is known for his strong hold in Pathri town and as a Sharad Pawar confidant in the political spectrum. He started his political career as a member of Pathri municipal council and later became President of Pathri municipal council and Wakf Board member. He defeated 3 time MLA, Haribhau Lahane of Shivsena in 2004 Maharashtra assembly elections as a Nationalist Congress Party candidate from Pathri (Vidhan Sabha constituency). He got elected as Member of Maharashtra Legislative Council in 2012 from Parbhani-Hingoli local authorities constituency. On 10 July 2018 he got re-elected unopposed as Member of Maharashtra Legislative Council.

== Positions held ==
- Member, Pathri Municipal Council
- President, Pathri Municipal Council
- Member, Maharashtra State Board of Waqf
- Member, Maharashtra Legislative Assembly (MLA)
- Member, Maharashtra Legislative Council (MLC)
- District President, Nationalist Congress Party
