= Gopikishan Bajoria =

Indian politician

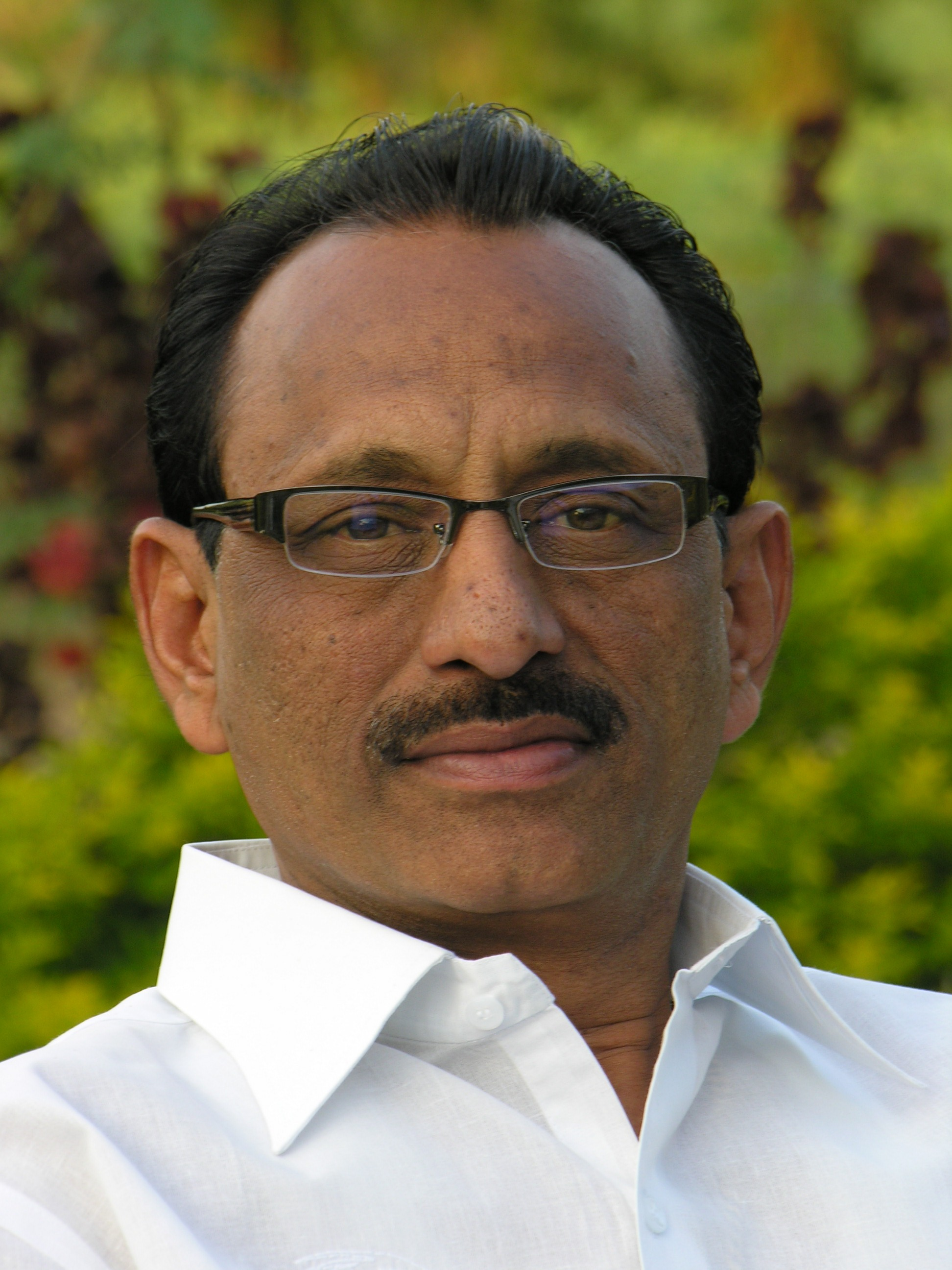

Member of Legislative Council of Maharashtra
- In office (2004-2010), (2010-2016), (2016 – 2022)
- Constituency: Akola-Washim-Buldhana Local Authorities

Personal details
- Party: Shiv Sena
- Children: Viplove Bajoria
- Education: B.Sc. and LLB, from Amravati University

Gopikishan Radhakisan Bajoria is a Shiv Sena politician from Akola district, Maharashtra. He is a Member of Legislative Council as a member of Shiv Sena representing Akola-cum-Washim-cum-Buldhana Local Authorities constituency. He has been elected to Maharashtra Legislative Council for three consecutive terms for 2004, 2010 and 2016.

He got elected to legislative council for the third consecutive time with a record margin of 274 votes, securing 513 of the total 791 votes. During his tenure as a legislator he has achieved a special grant for Shioni airport, Akola and successfully raised funds from the state government. Apart from this, he is largely associated with social work. Gopikishan Bajoria has played a key role in the development of cottage industries and small-scale village industries for the employment and betterment of low earning farmers of Akot, Telhara and Hiwarkhed.

== Positions held ==
- 2004: Elected to Maharashtra Legislative Council (1st term)
- 2010: Re-elected to Maharashtra Legislative Council (2nd term)
- 2016: Re-elected to Maharashtra Legislative Council (3rd term)
