= Mohanrao Kadam =

Indian politician

Member of Legislative Council of Maharashtra
- In office 6 December 2016 – 5 December 2022
- Preceded by: Prabhakar Gharge, NCP
- Succeeded by: Dhairyasheel Kadam
- Constituency: Sangli-Satara Local Areas Constituency

Personal details
- Party: Indian National Congress

Mohanrao Shirpati Kadam is a politician of the Indian National Congress. On 23 November 2016 he was elected to the Maharashtra Legislative Council from Local Areas Constituency of Sangli and Satara.

== Positions held ==
- Maharashtra Legislative Council
