= Kolhapur Local Authorities constituency =

Maharashtra, India legislative council seat

Kolhapur Local Authorities constituency is one of 78 Legislative Council seats in Maharashtra Legislative Council. This constituency covers Kolhapur district.

== Members of Legislative Council ==
Year	Member	Party
1998	Mahadevrao Mahadik	Independent politician
2004	Mahadevrao Mahadik	Indian National Congress
2010	Mahadevrao Mahadik	Indian National Congress
2016	Satej Patil	Indian National Congress
2022	Satej Patil	Indian National Congress
