= Amrish Patel =

Indian politician

Amrishbhai Rasiklal Patel

Member of Maharashtra Legislative Council
- Incumbent
- Assumed office 5 December 2020
- Preceded by: Himself
- Constituency: Dhule–Nandurbar Local Authorities constituency
- In office 2 January 2010 – 1 October 2019
- Preceded by: Chandrakant Raghuwanshi
- Succeeded by: Himself
- Constituency: Dhule–Nandurbar Local Authorities constituency

Member of Maharashtra Legislative Assembly
- In office 1990–2009
- Preceded by: Patil Sambhaji Hiraman
- Constituency: Shirpur

Cabinet minister, Government of Maharashtra
- In office 2003–2004
- Succeeded by: Kashiram Vechan Pawara

Personal details
- Born: 14 September 1952 (age 74) Ujjain, Madhya Bharat, India (now in Madhya Pradesh, India)
- Party: Bharatiya Janata Party
- Other political affiliations: Indian National Congress (till 2019)
- Relatives: Sardar Vallabhbhai Patel

Amrishbhai Rasiklal Patel (born 14 September 1952) is an Indian politician belonging to Bharatiya Janata Party (BJP). He started his political career in the Shirpur as an independent politician, and was the President of Shirpur Municipal Corporation, a four-time (1990 to 2009) legislator from Shirpur Assembly constituency as an Indian National Congress candidate, who has never lost an assembly election, and was also a state government cabinet minister. He joined Bharatiya Janata Party in 2019.

Amrish Patel is Chancellor of SVKM's NMIMS and President of Shri Vile Parle Kelavani Mandal, a Mumbai-based Educational Trust, which runs several institutions including Mithibai College, Narsee Monjee College of Commerce and Economics, SVKM's NMIMS and Dwarkadas J. Sanghvi College of Engineering. He is also the founder of Shirpur Education Society.

== Personal life ==
Amrish Patel was born on 2 November 1952 to Rasiklal Patel in Ujjain. He completed his schooling in Ujjain and Ahmedabad, and later moved to Shirpur with his father. Patel is married to Jayshreeben Patel with whom he has a son and a daughter.

== Political career ==
Patel entered politics as an independent candidate in Shirpur-Warwade municipal council elections and contested and won as President (1985) and held the position for 12 years. Later, he joined Indian National Congress and contested and won Assembly elections from Shirpur Assembly constituency in 1990, 1995, 1999 and 2004. He had also served as Cabinet Minister for School Education, Culture, Sports & Youth Affairs (Govt. of Maharashtra) in the year 2003-04 and also served as Guardian Minister Of Dhule District. He was declared unopposed elected Member of Maharashtra Legislative Council as an Indian National Congress nominee, representing Dhule & Nandurbar Dist. in 2009 and as a Bharatiya Janata Party candidate in 2021.

== Social work ==
=== Shirpur Pattern ===
Amrish Patel is also known for his contribution to Shirpur for the implemented irrigation project, started in October 2004, popularly known as the "Shirpur pattern". The project manager for the Shirpur pattern was Suresh Khanapurkar.

=== Priyadarshini Spinning Mill ===
Amrishbhai is Founder Chairman of Priyadarshini Spinning Mill, Shirpur which has provided employment to over 5000 people of Shirpur and has successfully created a notable position on the national map of textile industries.

=== Shirpur Education Society ===
Amrish Patel was instrumental in establishing Shirpur Education Society which owns 69 institutes of primary, secondary and higher education, imparting education to more than 40,000 students from K.G. (Kindergarten) to P.G. (Postgraduate) level.

=== Dhule District Co-operative Bank ===
Patel had been the Chairman of Dhule District Central Co-operative Bank for many years. (Tenure = 1998 to 1999)
