= Jagannath Abhyankar =

Indian politician

- जगन्नाथ अभ्यंकर

Member of Maharashtra Legislative Council
- Incumbent
- Assumed office 8 July 2024
- Constituency: Mumbai Teacher constituency

Personal details
- Party: Shiv Sena(UBT)
- Occupation: Politician

Jagannath M. Abhyankar (Marathi: जगन्नाथ अभ्यंकर) is an Indian politician and leader of Shiv Sena (UBT) from Maharashtra. He is member of Maharashtra Legislative Council.

== Positions held ==
- 2024: Elected to Maharashtra Legislative Council

== See also ==
- List of members of the Maharashtra Legislative Council
