= Gurumukh Das Jagwani =

Indian politician

Gurumukh Das Jagwani is an Indian politician from Jalgaon in Maharashtra State, India. He is a member of the Nationalist congress party NCP.

Jagwani is a member of Maharashtra Legislative Council, with term ending on 5 December 2016. He is elected from Jalgaon Local Authorities constituency.

Jagwani is the Former Maharashtra state minister.
