= Chhatra Bharati =

Chhatra Bharati (Hindi छात्र भारती) is one of major independent student organization based in India. The Organisation is based on socialist ideology. Chhatra Bharati is not affiliated to any Political Party; But during elections, it actively participates or gives its support to an individual or like-minded political parties. Chhatra Bharati is currently led by Prof. Rohit dhale as President.

In 2012–13 Chhatra Bharati launched protest all over Maharashtra against rape and violence against women. Chhatra Bharati staged an agitation at The Tribal Commissionerate at Nashik demanding suspension of senior officials of tribal development in connection with the rape of 18-year-old tribal girl.

== See also ==
- Akhil Bharatiya Vidyarthi Parishad
- All India Students Federation
- National Students Union of India
- Students Federation of India
