= Suresh Sakhabhau Deshmukh =

Indian politician

- सुरेश सखाभाऊ देशमुख

Member of Maharashtra Legislative Council
- In office (2005-2006), (2006 – 2012)
- Succeeded by: Babajani Durani NCP
- Constituency: Parbhani-Hingoli Local Authorities Constituency

Personal details
- Party: Indian National Congress
- Parent: Sakhabhau Deshmukh (father)
- Occupation: Agriculture
- Known for: Confidant of Vilasrao Deshmukh

Suresh Deshmukh is an Indian politician from Parbhani of Maharashtra who belongs to the Indian National Congress. He was a member of Maharashtra Legislative Council from Parbhani-Hingoli Local Authorities Constituency and former Parbhani district president of Indian National Congress.
