= Dhiraj Lingade =

Indian politician

Member of Maharashtra Legislative Council
- Incumbent
- Assumed office 3 February 2023
- Preceded by: Ranjit Patil
- Constituency: Amravati Graduates constituency

Personal details
- Born: 6 April 1972 (age 54) Yelgaon, Buldhana district
- Party: Indian National Congress
- Other political affiliations: Shivsena
- Spouse: Padmaja Lingade
- Children: 2 sons
- Parent: Rambhau Lingade (father)
- Education: Graduate B.A from Jijamata College Buldhana, SSC from Shri Shivaji University Buldhana
- Occupation: Politician

Dhiraj Rambhau Lingade is a politician from the state of Maharashtra and is a member of the Maharashtra Legislative Council representing the Graduates constituencies of Amravati.
