= Sujitsingh Thakur =

Indian politician (born 1967)

- सुजितसिंह ठाकूर
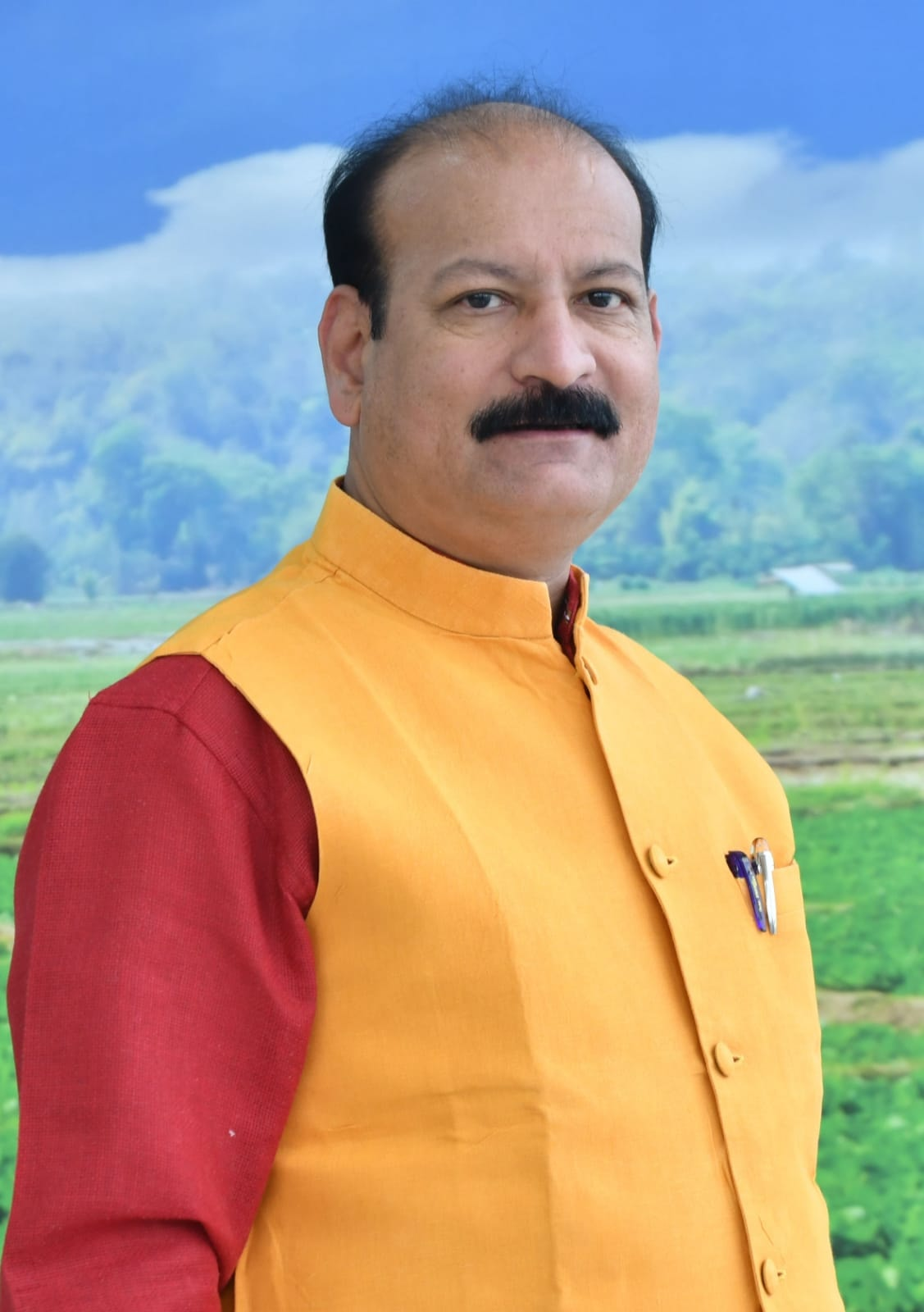

Member of Legislative Council of Maharashtra
- In office June 2016 – June 2022
- Constituency: Elected by MLAs

General Secretary of Maharashtra BJP
- Incumbent
- Assumed office 2015

Personal details
- Born: 21 February 1967 (age 59) India
- Party: BJP

Sujitsingh Thakur (Marathi: सुजितसिंह ठाकूर) is BJP politician from Paranda, Osmanabad, Maharashtra. He is current Member of Legislative Council of Maharashtra as a member of BJP. He is also the General Secretary of Maharashtra BJP.

== Positions held ==
- 2012: General Secretary of Maharashtra BJP
- 2005: General Secretary of Maharashtra BJP
- 2016: Elected as Member of Maharashtra Legislative Council
- 2014:- SANGHARSH YATRA
- 2020:- General secretary of maharashtra BJP
