= Ravindra Phatak =

Indian politician

Member of Legislative Council of Maharashtra
- Incumbent
- Assumed office 9 June 2016
- Preceded by: Vasant Davkhare, NCP
- Constituency: Thane Local Authorities

Standing Committee Chairman of Thane Municipal Corporation
- In office 2012–2013

Personal details
- Party: Shiv Sena
- Website: ravindraphatak.com

Ravindra Sadanand Phatak is a Shiv Sena politician from Thane district, Maharashtra. He was a Member of Legislative Council of Maharashtra as a member of Shiv Sena representing Thane Local Authorities constituency. He had been elected as the Standing Committee Chairman of Thane Municipal Corporation for two terms in 2005 and 2012. He had unsuccessfully contested the Maharashtra Legislative Assembly election from Thane Vidhan Sabha Constituency in 2014.

== Positions held ==
- 2002: Elected as corporator in Thane Municipal Corporation
- 2005: Elected as standing Committee chairman of Thane Municipal Corporation
- 2007: Re-elected as corporator in Thane Municipal Corporation
- 2012: Re-elected as corporator in Thane Municipal Corporation
- 2012: Elected as standing Committee chairman of Thane Municipal Corporation
- 2015: Re-elected as corporator in Thane Municipal Corporation
1. 2016: elected as Maharashtra Member of Legislative Council.
2. 2026: Re-elected as Maharashtra Member of Legislative Council.
