= Kiran Pawaskar =

Indian politician

Maharashtra Legislative Council in Maharashtra Vidhan Parishad from the Nationalist Congress Party
- In office 2011–2017

Maharashtra Legislative Council in Maharashtra Vidhan Parishad from the Shiv Sena
- In office 2005–2011

Personal details
- Party: Shivsena
- Children: 2
- Occupation: Politician

Kiran Pawaskar is a political leader in Maharashtra, India. He is currently a part of Shiv Sena(Eknath Shinde) party. He was elected to the Maharashtra Legislative Council on a Nationalist Congress Party ticket in 2011. He was also a former Shiv Sena trade union leader.

== Political career ==
Kiran Pawaskar was a Member of the Legislative Council for the National Congress Party and lead his trade union in Maharashtra. Now, he is a part of Balasahebanchi Shiv Sena political party. Kiran Pawaskar was a former general secretary of the Bharatiya Kamgar Sena.
