= Subhash Zambad =

Indian politician

Member of Maharashtra Legislative Council
- In office 30 Aug 2013 – 29 Aug 2019
- Constituency: Aurangabad-Jalna Local Authorities

Personal details
- Born: Subhash Zambad; 25 April 1962 (age 64) Karanjgaon, Aurangabad district, Maharashtra
- Party: Indian National Congress
- Website: Subhash Zambad

Subhash Manakchand Zambad (born 25 April 1962) is an Indian politician who is an elected member of the Maharashtra Legislative Council from Aurangabad Jalna constituency . He is a leader of the Indian National Congress from Maharashtra state

== Political career ==
Subhash Manakchand Zambad was elected to the Legislative Assembly as a Congress candidate in elections held in the October 2013. He is Founder Chairman of Ajanta Urban Co-Op Bank Ltd., Aurangabad. In 1999 he established the Ajintha Co. Op Bank in Aurangabad He was the chairman of Maha. State Housing Corp. Ltd. Mumbai during 2008 – 10. and He was elected as a Vice President of CREDAI Maharashtra in the year 2010. Also, He has nominated as General Secretary of Maharashtra State Congress Committee in the Year 2016.
