= Nago Ganar =

Indian politician

Member of Maharashtra Legislative Council
- Incumbent
- Assumed office 8 February 2017 - 2023
- Constituency: Nagpur Teacher's Constituency

Personal details
- Party: BJP
- Profession: Teacher, Politician

Nago Ganar was a member of Maharashtra Legislative Council from Nagpur Teacher's Constituency. He was an MLC from 5 December 2010 to 5 December 2016 and got re-elected to the council on 8 February 2017.
