= Vijay Girkar =

Indian politician

Member of Maharashtra Legislative Council
- In office 28 July 2012 – 27 July 2024
- Constituency: elected by Legislative Assembly members
- In office 8 July 1998 – 7 July 2004
- Constituency: elected by Legislative Assembly members

President of Bharatiya Janata Party – Mumbai
- In office 20 August 2003 – 4 November 2004
- Preceded by: Vinod Tawde
- Succeeded by: Prakash Mehta

Minister of state Government of Maharashtra
- In office 9 May 1998 – 18 October 1999
- Chief Minister: Manohar Joshi; Narayan Rane
- Department: Social Welfare

Personal details
- Political party: Bharatiya Janata Party
- Spouse: Shailaja Girkar
- Children: Yogesh Girkar; Kranti Girkar

Vijay Girkar is an Indian politician and member of the Bharatiya Janata Party. Vijay Girkar is a member of the Maharashtra Legislative Council elected by Vidhan Sabha Members quota. He was also a Minister of the State of Maharashtra. He is regarded as "Bhai".

His spouse Late Shailaja Vijay Girkar was the Deputy Mayor of Brihan Mumbai Municipal Corporation.
