= Dnyaneshwar Mhatre =

Indian politician

Member of the Maharashtra Legislative Council
- Incumbent
- Assumed office 3 February 2023
- Constituency: Konkan Division

Personal details
- Born: 4 January 1978 (age 48) Badlapur
- Party: BJP
- Spouse: Snehal Mhatre
- Children: Harshita & Nidhi
- Parent: Barku Zhipru Mhatre (father)
- Occupation: Politician

Dnyaneshwar Barku Mhatre is a politician from the state of Maharashtra and is a member of the Maharashtra Legislative Council representing the constituency of Konkan.
