= Sudhakar Adbale =

Indian politician

Member of the Maharashtra Legislative Council
- Incumbent
- Assumed office 3 February 2023

Personal details
- Occupation: Politician

Sudhakar Govindrao Adbale is a politician from the state of Maharashtra and is a member of the Maharashtra Legislative Council representing the constituency of Nagpur.
