= Ashok Gajanan Modak =

Indian politician (1940–2026)

Ashok G. Modak (1940 – 2 January 2026) was an Indian politician from Mumbai, who served as the Chancellor of Guru Ghasidas Vishwavidyalaya. He did his Master of Arts (M.A.) first in Economics (1963) and later in political science (1967) from the University of Pune. He obtained his doctorate (Ph.D.) from the Jawaharlal Nehru University, New Delhi in 1980. His doctorate subject was "Soviet Economic Aid to India." In recognition of his contribution in the field of education, the Government of India nominated him for the position of National Research Professor on 6 January 2015 for a period of five years.

On 21 January 2016, Lokesh Chandra, president of the Indian Council for Cultural Relations (ICCR) appointed Modak as a member of the reconstituted General Assembly of ICCR for a term of three years.

In 1963 he began his teaching career as lecturer in Economics at the Arts, Science and Commerce College at Chalisgaon in Jalgaon District in the state of Maharashtra. Later after serving as lecturer in Ramnarain Ruia College, Mumbai he joined as reader in the Centre for Soviet Studies, University of Mumbai. Whilst at this juncture; in 1994 he was invited by the Bharatiya Janata Party (BJP) to be a candidate from the Graduates Constituency of the Konkan region in the state of Maharashtra. He won the elections in 1994 and 2000 to become a Member of the Legislative Council (MLC) of the state of Maharashtra. He continued in this position for 12 years till 2006.

In 2006, the University of Mumbai offered him the honorary position of adjunct professor in the Centre for Central Eurasian Studies and he was busy in this role until his death.

Modak pursued his research activities in several countries like the former USSR, the Netherlands, the United Kingdom and the former Yugoslavia to name a few. In 1986 the US Government invited him for a month-long participation in seminars on Superpower Relations. He was a research student at Jawaharlal Nehru University, New Delhi; the Oriental Institute, Moscow; and the Institute of Social Studies in The Hague.

He wrote 40 books, over 104 research papers and several newspaper and magazine articles in periodicals like International Studies, Journal of Indian Council of World Affairs New Delhi and Eternal India; New Delhi.

Recipient of the Best Parliamentarian Award (1997) from the Legislative Council, Mumbai; Modak also won the P.B. Bhave Orator Award, Writer-Award and Chhatrapati Sambhaji Maharaj Award for his work in the Legislative Council of Maharashtra.

Modak also voluntarily involved himself on various forums and committees. In later life, he was the President of two educational institutes in the state of Maharashtra. He headed the Konkan Graduates Forum which deals with imparting vocational education to female students. He also headed the Sahyadri Adiwasi Bahuvidha Sewa Sangh; an organisation rendering welfare services to tribal people of the Thane district in Maharashtra. Also in later life, he delivered a lecture series on "Integral Humanism and Westernism – A Comparative Analysis"; "Relevance of Integral Humanism in Present Era" by India Foundation; New Delhi and India Policy Foundation; New Delhi.

Modak died in Mumbai on 2 January 2026, at the age of 85.

== Academic qualifications, research activities and work experience ==
- 1963: Master of Arts in Economics; University of Pune
- 1967: Master of Arts in Political Science; University of Pune
- 1963 to 1967: Lecturer in Economics at the Arts, Science and Commerce College at Chalisgaon, Jalgaon District, Maharashtra
- 1967 to 1969: Research activities; Indian School of International Studies, New Delhi
- 1969 to 1971: Research activities on Soviet Relations with India; Oriental Institute, Moscow
- 1971 to 1983: Lecturer in Ramnarain Ruia College, Mumbai
- 1974 to 1975: Thesis on Role of Nikita Khrushchev in Soviet Yugoslav Relations; Institute of Social Studies, The Hague, the Netherlands
- 1975: Post Graduate Diploma in International Development; Institute of Social Studies, The Hague, the Netherlands
- 1980:
- 1983 to 1994: Reader in the Centre for Soviet Studies, University of Mumbai
- 1994 to 2006: Member of the Legislative Council (MLC); Maharashtra
- 2006 to 2026: Honorary Adjunct Professor - Centre for Central Eurasian Studies; University of Mumbai
- 2006 to 2026: Political, social and economic commentator for leading news and print media

== Selected books and research articles ==
- Economic History of the Soviet Union
- Analysis of Gorbachev Era
- Economic Thinking of Gopal Krishna Gokhale
- A Genuine Socialist Thinker – Dr. Ram Manohar Lohia
- Was Swami Vivekananda a Socialist
- Left Front Rule in West Bengal – Genesis, Growth and Decay
- १८५७ चा स्वातंत्र्य लढा - द्रिष्टीकोन व मत मतांतरे
- हिंदुत्व - न्यायालयीन निवाडा आणि सेकुलर आग पाखड
- नामदार गोपाळ कृष्ण गोखले
- श्री गुरुजी - जीवन आणि कार्य
- धर्मपाल साहित्य - शोध आणि बोध
- शिक्षणाचे भगवीकरण - आक्षेप आणि तथ्य
- राष्ट्र विचाराचे सामाजिक आशय
- विवेकानंद - विचार आणि सध्यस्तिथि
- स्वामी विवेकानंद - चिरंतन चैतन्याचा स्त्रोत

== Web references ==
1. https://web.archive.org/web/20141130004134/http://www.esakal.com/TagSearch.aspx?TagName=dr.%20ashok%20modak
2. http://www.bookganga.com/eBooks/Books/Details/5003411020206404958
3. https://web.archive.org/web/20140715110820/http://www.mu.ac.in/arts/social_science/Eurasian_Studies/Seminar.html
4. http://www.oneindia.com/2006/06/04/bjp-to-field-sanjay-kelkar-for-mlc-polls-1149492467.html
5. https://web.archive.org/web/20150924030239/http://www.hindunet.org/hvk/specialrepo/mms/ch2.html
6. http://www.indiapolicyfoundation.org/Encyc/2014/9/18/351_03_47_54_Brochure.pdf

== Sources ==
- Modak, Ashok. "Sakal News & Articles". Archived from the original on 30 November 2014.
- Modak, Ashok (1982). Economic Development of the USSR. Mumbai: agris.fao.org.
- Modak, Ashok (1991). Soviet Union Under Gorbachev. Mumbai: Somaiya Publications.
- Modak, Ashok (1997). Left Front Rule in West Bengal. Center for Leadership Studies.
- National Research Professor
- National Research Professor Nomination
