= Vasant Davkhare =

Indian politician

Vasant Shankar Davkhare

Member of Maharashtra Legislative Council
- In office 1992–2016
- Succeeded by: Ravindra Phatak, Shiv Sena
- Constituency: Thane Local Authorities

Mayor of Thane Municipal Corporation
- In office 21 March 1987 – 19 March 1988

Member of Thane Municipal Corporation
- In office 1986–1992

Personal details
- Born: 8 November 1949; Shirur, Dist.Pune
- Died: 4 January 2018 (aged 68)
- Political party: Nationalist Congress Party
- Children: Prabbodh Davkhare, Niranjan Davkhare (MLC Konkan graduates Constituency Maharashtra)

Vasant Shankar Davkhare was an Indian politician of the Nationalist Congress Party. He served as the Deputy Chairman of the Maharashtra Legislative Council from 1998 until his death.

== Personal life ==
On 22 May 2010 Davkhare's wife died due to massive cardiac arrest. Davkhare died on 4 January 2018 from kidney failure.
