= Niranjan Davkhare =

Indian politician (born 1979)

- निरंजन डावखरे

Member of Maharashtra Legislative Council
- Incumbent
- Assumed office 8 July 2012
- Preceded by: Sanjay Kelkar
- Constituency: Konkan Graduates' constituency

Personal details
- Born: 15 April 1979 (age 47)
- Party: BJP
- Other party: Nationalist Congress Party
- Website: www.niranjandavkhare.in

Niranjan Davkhare (born 15 April 1979) is an Indian politician belonging to the Bharatiya Janata Party. On 28 June 2018, he was elected to the Maharashtra Legislative Council from Konkan Graduates constituency. He is the son of late NCP leader Vasant Davkhare. Just before Graduate MLC polls in 2018 Niranjan Davkhare had resigned from the NCP and had joined the BJP. Niranjan Davkhare is elected as Thane District BJP president. He held the same seat from 2012 to 2018 on an NCP ticket. He is known to maintain good decent relations with other political leaders too as his father Vasant Davkhare did in the past. Currently he is Thane BJP's Chief. His constituency is huge with 5 districts starting from Sindhudurg, Ratnagiri, Raigad, Thane & Palghar. His simple style of living is appreciated by common public. Currently he is the politician who even travels by public transport like local trains etc. for his political programs at various places in Mumbai.
