= List of leaders of the house in the Maharashtra Legislative Council =

Caucus head of the majority party in the upper house of Maharashtra

Leader of the House of the Maharashtra Legislative Council
- सभागृह नेते महाराष्ट्र विधान परिषद
- Seal of Maharashtra

- Flag of India

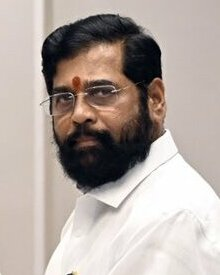
- Incumbent; Eknath Shinde; Deputy Chief Minister since 9 December 2024
- Maharashtra Legislative Council
- Style: The Honourable
- Member of: Council of ministers; Cabinet; Maharashtra Legislature
- Reports to: Government of Maharashtra
- Residence: Mumbai, India
- Seat: Maharashtra Legislature
- Appointer: Chief Minister of Maharashtra & Cabinet
- Term length: During the life of the vidhan Sabha (five years maximum)
- Constituting instrument: -
- Precursor: Leader of the House of The Bombay Legislative Council (1947-60)
- Inaugural holder: Marotrao Kannamwar (1960 - 1962)
- Formation: 1 May 1960
- Deputy: Pankaja Munde
- Salary: ₹ - approximately
- Website: -

Eknath Shinde is the current Leader of the House of the Maharashtra Legislative Council since 9 December 2024.

== Leader of the House ==
The council has a Leader of the House, who heads the government caucus. The office is provided for in the Legislative Council Rules, which defines it as "Chief Minister or any other Minister appointed by Chief Minister". The Rules further mandate that the chairperson should conduct parliamentary business in consultation with the Leader.

No.	Portrait	Name	Term of office			Chairperson of the House	Party
1	-	Marotrao Kannamwar (Minister of Public Works (Excluding Public Undertakings))	1 May 1960	8 March 1962	1 year, 311 days	Bhogilal Dhirajlal Lala; Vitthal Sakharam Page	Indian National Congress
2	-	Balasaheb Desai (Minister of Agriculture)	8 March 1962	19 November 1962	256 days	Vitthal Sakharam Page	Indian National Congress
3	-	P. K. Sawant (Minister of Public Health)	20 November 1962	24 November 1963	1 year, 4 days	Vitthal Sakharam Page	Indian National Congress
4	-	S. K. Wankhede (Minister of Industries)	25 November 1963	4 December 1963	9 days	Vitthal Sakharam Page	Indian National Congress
5		Shankarrao Chavan (Minister of Energy)	5 December 1963	1 March 1967	3 years, 86 days	Vitthal Sakharam Page	Indian National Congress
6		Vasantrao Naik (Chief Minister)	1 March 1967	13 March 1972	5 years, 12 days	Vitthal Sakharam Page	Indian National Congress
7		Pratibha Patil (Minister of Social Justice)	13 March 1972	20 February 1975	2 years, 344 days	Vitthal Sakharam Page	Indian National Congress
8	-	A. R. Antulay (Minister of Law and Judiciary)	21 February 1975	16 May 1977	2 years, 84 days	Vitthal Sakharam Page; Vitthal Sakharam Page	Indian National Congress
9		Vasantdada Patil (Chief Minister)	17 May 1977	5 March 1978	292 days	Vitthal Sakharam Page	Indian National Congress
10	-	Nashikrao Tirpude (Deputy Chief Minister)	5 March 1978	18 July 1978	76 days	Vitthal Sakharam Page; Ram Meghe Acting Chairperson; R. S. Gavai	Indian National Congress
11	-	Sundarrao Solanke (Deputy Chief Minister)	18 July 1978	18 February 1980	1 year, 215 days	R. S. Gavai	Indian Congress (Socialist)
12	-	Babasaheb Bhosale (Minister of Law and Judiciary)	9 June 1980	12 January 1982	1 year, 217 days	R. S. Gavai	Indian National Congress
13	-	Shivajirao Patil Nilangekar (Minister of Special Assistance)	13 January 1982	1 February 1983	1 year, 19 days	R. S. Gavai; Jayant Shridhar Tilak	Indian National Congress
14	-	Ramrao Adik (Deputy Chief Minister)	7 February 1983	5 March 1985	2 years, 26 days	Jayant Shridhar Tilak	Indian National Congress
(9)		Vasantdada Patil (Chief Minister)	12 March 1985	1 June 1985	81 days	Jayant Shridhar Tilak	Indian National Congress
15	-	Surupsingh Hirya Naik (Minister of Public Works (Excluding Public Undertakings))	4 June 1985	6 March 1986	275 days	Jayant Shridhar Tilak	Indian National Congress
(5)		Shankarrao Chavan (Chief Minister)	12 March 1986	26 June 1988	2 years, 106 days	Jayant Shridhar Tilak	Indian National Congress
16		Sushilkumar Shinde (Minister of Finance)	26 June 1988	3 March 1990	1 year, 222 days	Jayant Shridhar Tilak	Indian National Congress
17	-	Sudhakarrao Naik (Minister of Revenue)	4 March 1990	25 June 1991	1 year, 113 days	Jayant Shridhar Tilak	Indian National Congress
18	-	Ramrao Adik (Minister of Finance)	25 June 1991	22 February 1993	1 year, 242 days	Jayant Shridhar Tilak	Indian National Congress
19		Shivajirao Deshmukh (Minister of Public Works (Excluding Public Undertakings))	3 March 1993	14 March 1995	2 years, 8 days	Jayant Shridhar Tilak	Indian National Congress
20		Gopinath Munde (Deputy Chief Minister)	14 March 1995	1 February 1999	3 years, 324 days	Jayant Shridhar Tilak; Bhaurao Tulshiram Deshmukh Acting Chairperson; N. S. Pharande	Bharatiya Janata Party
21	-	Sudhir Joshi (Minister of Revenue)	1 February 1999	17 October 1999	258 days	N. S. Pharande	Shiv Sena
22	-	Patangrao Kadam (Minister of Industries)	18 October 1999	16 January 2003	3 years, 92 days	N. S. Pharande	Indian National Congress
23		Ranjeet Deshmukh (Rural Development)	18 January 2003	23 December 2003	1 year, 340 days	N. S. Pharande	Indian National Congress
24		Vijaysingh Mohite-Patil (Deputy Chief Minister)	27 December 2003	19 October 2004	297 days	N. S. Pharande; Vasant Davkhare Acting Chairperson; Shivajirao Deshmukh	Nationalist Congress Party
25		R. R. Patil (Deputy Chief Minister)	1 November 2004	4 December 2008	4 years, 33 days	Shivajirao Deshmukh	Nationalist Congress Party
26	-	Patangrao Kadam (Minister of Revenue)	8 December 2008	7 November 2009	334 days	Shivajirao Deshmukh	Indian National Congress
27		Chhagan Bhujbal (Deputy Chief Minister)	7 November 2009	10 November 2010	1 year, 3 days	Shivajirao Deshmukh	Nationalist Congress Party
28		Ajit Pawar; Deputy Chief Minister	11 November 2010	25 September 2012	1 year, 319 days	Shivajirao Deshmukh	Nationalist Congress Party
(25)		R R Patil (Minister of Home Affairs)	29 September 2012	26 September 2014	2 years, 6 days	Shivajirao Deshmukh	Nationalist Congress Party
29		Eknath Khadse (Revenue Minister)	9 December 2014	7 July 2016	1 year, 211 days	Shivajirao Deshmukh; Ramraje Naik Nimbalkar	Bharatiya Janata Party
30		Chandrakant Bacchu Patil (Public Works (Excluding Public Undertakings) Minister)	8 July 2016	8 November 2019	3 years, 123 days	Ramraje Naik Nimbalkar	Bharatiya Janata Party
31		Subhash Desai (Industries Minister)	16 December 2019	24 February 2020	70 days	Ramraje Naik Nimbalkar	Shiv Sena
(28)		Ajit Pawar; Deputy Chief Minister	24 February 2020	29 June 2022	2 years, 125 days	Ramraje Naik Nimbalkar	Nationalist Congress Party
32		Devendra Fadnavis; Deputy Chief Minister	17 August 2022	26 November 2024	2 years, 101 days	Neelam Gorhe Acting Chairperson	Bhartiya Janata Party
33		Eknath Shinde; Deputy Chief Minister	9 December 2024	Incumbent	1 year, 293 days	Ram Shinde	Shiv Sena

== Deputy Leader of The House ==
No.	Portrait	Name	Party	Term of office			Chairman of Council	Leader of Council	Ministry	Chief Minister
01		Ranjeet Deshmukh रणजीत देशमुख (Cabinet Minister of Rural Development, Panchayat Raj, Employment Guarantee Scheme, and Ex-Servicemen Welfare)	Indian National Congress	06 March 1993	18 November 1994	1 year, 257 days	Jayant Shridhar Tilak	Shivajirao Deshmukh	Pawar IV	Sharad Pawar
02		Sudhir Joshi सुधीर जोशी (Cabinet Minister of Revenue, Khar Land Development, Relief and Rehabilitation, and School Education)	Shiv Sena	14 March 1995	01 February 1999	3 years, 324 days	Jayant Shridhar Tilak (Ending - 1998); Bhaurao Tulshiram Deshmukh (1998 - 1998) Additional Charge; Narayana Sadashiv Pharande (Starting - 1998)	Gopinath Munde	Joshi	Manohar Joshi
03		Nitin Gadkari नितीन गडकरी (Cabinet Minister of Public Works (Excluding Public Undertakings), Public Works (Including Public Undertakings), and Energy and Industries)	Bhartiya Janata Party	01 February 1999	17 October 1999	258 days	Narayana Sadashiv Pharande	Sudhir Joshi	Rane	Narayan Rane
04		Husain Dalwai हुसेन दलवाई (Cabinet Minister of Labour, Minority Development and Aukaf, and Ports)	Indian National Congress	19 October 1999	17 January 2003	3 years, 90 days	Narayana Sadashiv Pharande	Patangrao Kadam	Deshmukh I	Vilasrao Deshmukh
05		Vasant Chavan वसंत चव्हाण (Cabinet Minister of Food and Drug Administration and Mining)	Nationalist Congress Party	18 January 2003	23 December 2003	346 days	Narayana Sadashiv Pharande	Ranjeet Deshmukh	Sushilkumar	Sushilkumar Shinde
06		Shivajirao Moghe शिवाजीराव मोघे (Cabinet Minister of Tourism, Employment Guarantee, and Water Resources (Krishna Valley Development) and (Konkan Valley Development))	Indian National Congress	27 December 2003	01 November 2004	310 days	Narayana Sadashiv Pharande (Ending - 2004); Vasant Davkhare (2004 - 2004) Additional Charge; Shivajirao Deshmukh (Starting - 2004)	Vijaysingh Mohite-Patil	Sushilkumar	Sushilkumar Shinde
07		Suresh Jain सुरेश जैन (Cabinet Minister of Higher and Technical Education)	Indian National Congress	01 November 2004	01 December 2008	4 years, 30 days	Shivajirao Deshmukh	R. R. Patil	Deshmukh II	Vilasrao Deshmukh
08		Ramraje Naik Nimbalkar रामराजे नाईक निंबाळकर (Cabinet Minister of Irrigation (Krishna Valley Corporation), Disaster Management and Relief & Rehabilitation)	Nationalist Congress Party	08 December 2008	06 November 2009	333 days	Shivajirao Deshmukh	Patangrao Kadam	Ashok I	Ashok Chavan
09		Balasaheb Thorat बाळासाहेब थोरात (Cabinet Minister of Agriculture, Soil and Water Conservation, School Education and Marathi Language)	Indian National Congress	07 November 2009	10 November 2010	1 year, 3 days	Shivajirao Deshmukh	Chhagan Bhujbal	Ashok II	Ashok Chavan
10		Rajendra Darda राजेंद्र दर्डा (Cabinet Minister of School Education, Skill Development And Entrepreneurship, Sports and Youth Welfare)	Indian National Congress	11 November 2010	26 September 2014	3 years, 319 days	Shivajirao Deshmukh	Ajit Pawar (2010 - 2012); R. R. Patil (2012 - 2014)	Prithviraj	Prithviraj Chavan
11		Chandrakant Bacchu Patil चंद्रकांत बच्चू पाटील (Cabinet Minister of Public Works (Excluding Public Undertakings), Co-operation, Marketing, and Textiles)	Bhartiya Janata Party	31 October 2014	04 June 2016	1 year, 217 days	Shivajirao Deshmukh (Ending - 2015 ); Ramraje Naik Nimbalkar (Starting - 2015)	Eknath Khadse	Fadnavis I	Devendra Fadnavis
12		Pankaja Munde पंकजा मुंडे (Cabinet Minister of Rural Development, Panchayat Raj and Women and Child Development.)	Bhartiya Janata Party	08 July 2016	12 November 2019	3 years, 127 days	Ramraje Naik Nimbalkar	Chandrakant Bacchu Patil	Fadnavis I	Devendra Fadnavis
13		Vacant रिकामे	Independent	23 November 2019	28 November 2019	5 days	Ramraje Naik Nimbalkar	Devendra Fadnavis; In charge	Fadnavis II	Devendra Fadnavis
14 (In charge)		Nitin Raut नितीन राऊत (Cabinet Minister of Public Works (Excluding Public Undertakings), Tribal Development and Women and Child Development)	Indian National Congress	16 December 2019	24 February 2020	70 days	Ramraje Naik Nimbalkar	Subhash Desai; In charge	Thackeray	Uddhav Thackeray
15		Subhash Desai सुभाष देसाई (Cabinet Minister of Industries, Mining Department and Marathi Language)	Shiv Sena	24 February 2020	29 June 2022	2 years, 125 days	Ramraje Naik Nimbalkar	Ajit Pawar	Thackeray	Uddhav Thackeray
16		Uday Samant उदय सामंत (Cabinet Minister of Industries)	Shiv Sena (Shinde Group)	17 August 2022	26 November 2024	2 years, 101 days	Neelam Gorhe; Additional Charge	Devendra Fadnavis	Eknath	Eknath Shinde
17		Pankaja Munde पंकजा मुंडे (Cabinet Minister of Environment and Climate Change and Animal Husbandry.)	Bhartiya Janata Party	21 December 2024	Incumbent	1 year, 281 days	Ram Shinde	Eknath Shinde	Fadnavis III	Devendra Fadnavis

== See also ==
- List of governors of Maharashtra
- List of chief ministers of Maharashtra
- List of chairmen of the Maharashtra Legislative Council
