= Maharashtra Legislature =

Supreme legislative body of the state of Maharashtra

Maharashtra Legislature Maharashtra Vidhan Mandal
- Emblem of Maharashtra

Type
- Type: Bicameral
- Houses: Maharashtra Legislative Council (Upper house); Maharashtra Legislative Assembly (Lower house)

History
- Founded: 1 May 1960 (66 years ago)

Leadership
- Governor of Maharashtra: Jishnu Dev Varma
- Chief Minister of Maharashtra: Devendra Fadnavis, BJP
- Deputy Chief Minister of Maharashtra: Eknath Shinde, SHS Shinde Group and
- Parliamentary Affairs Minister & Deputy Minister: Minister: Chandrakant Patil (Cabinet Minister), BJP Deputy Minister: Vacant (Minister of State) Deputy Minister: Vacant (Minister of State)
- Chair & Deputy Chair Maharashtra Legislative Council: Chair: Ram Shinde, BJP Shinde Group; Deputy Chair: Neelam Gorhe, SHS Shinde Group
- Leader & Deputy Leader of the House Maharashtra Legislative Council: Leader: Eknath Shinde, Shiv Sena (Deputy Chief Minister) Deputy Leader: Pankaja Munde, BJP (Cabinet Minister)
- Leader & Deputy Leader of the Opposition Maharashtra Legislative Council: Leader: Vacant, no opposition party has more than 10% seats.
- Speaker & Deputy Speaker Maharashtra Legislative Assembly: Speaker: Rahul Narwekar, BJP; Deputy Speaker: Anna Bansode, NCP
- Leader & Deputy Leader of the House Maharashtra Legislative Assembly: Leader: Devendra Fadnavis, BJP (Chief Minister) Deputy Leader: Eknath Shinde, SHS, (Dy Chief Minister)
- Leader & Deputy Leader of the Opposition Maharashtra Legislative Assembly: Vacant, no opposition party has more than 10% seats.

Structure
- Seats: 366 (78 MLCs + 288 MLAs)
- Maharashtra Legislative Council political groups: Government (61); Opposition (12); Vacant (5)
- Maharashtra Legislative Assembly political groups: Government (237); Opposition (48); Others (3)

Elections
- Maharashtra Legislative Council voting system: Single transferable vote
- Maharashtra Legislative Assembly voting system: First-past-the-post
- Last Maharashtra Legislative Council election: 2020
- Last Maharashtra Legislative Assembly election: October 2024
- Next Maharashtra Legislative Council election: 2022
- Next Maharashtra Legislative Assembly election: October 2029

Meeting place
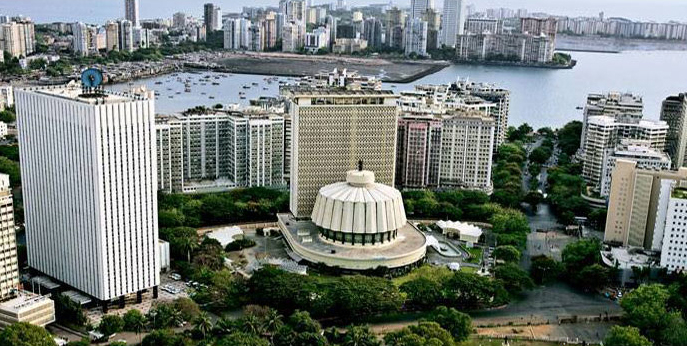
- Vidhan Bhavan, Mumbai
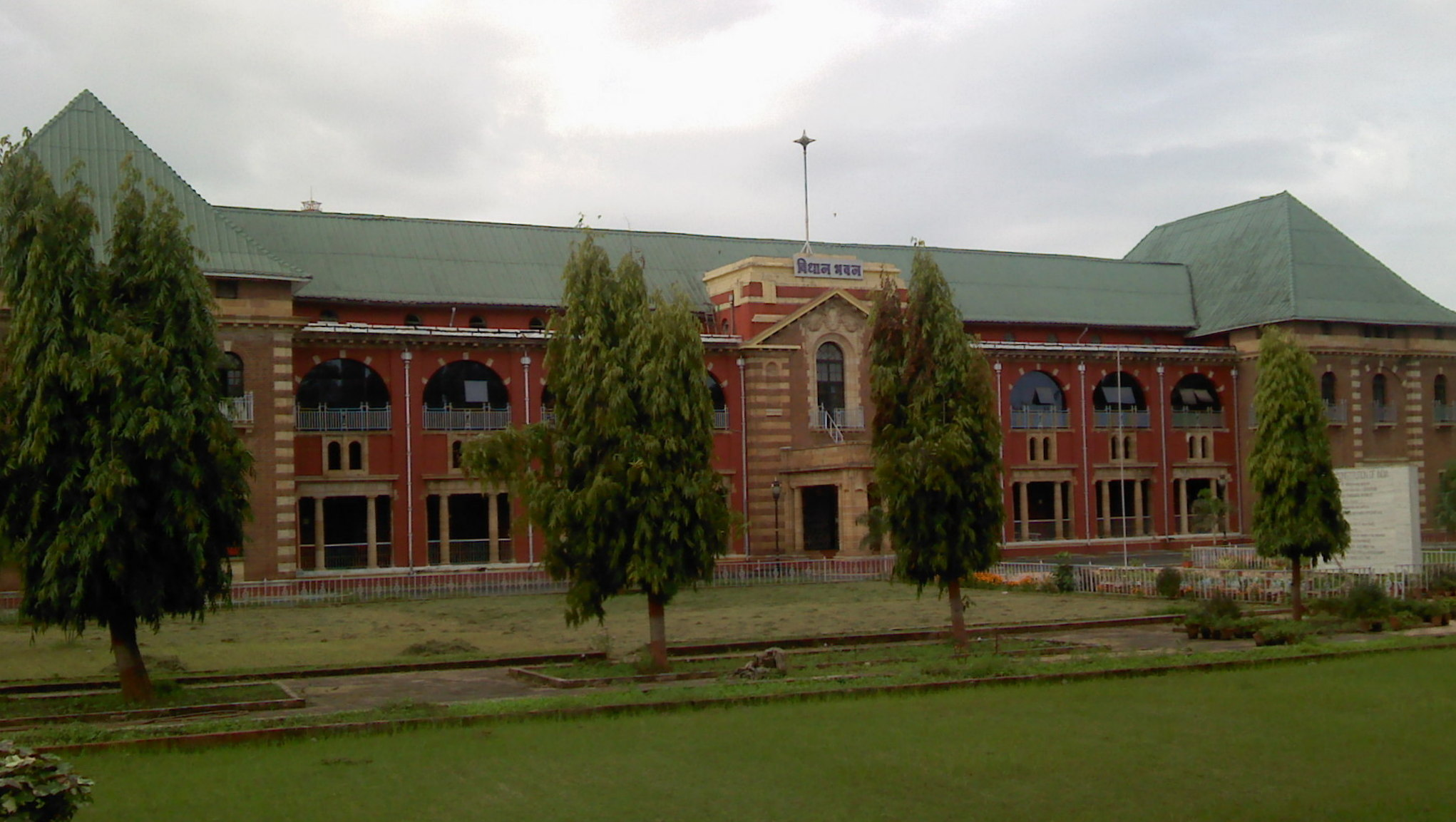
- Vidhan Bhavan, Nagpur (Winter session)

Website
- Government of Maharashtra; Maharashtra Legislature

Constitution
- Constitution of India

The Maharashtra Legislature (IAST: Maharashtra Vidhan Mandal) is the supreme legislative body of the state of Maharashtra. It is a bicameral legislature composed of the Governor of Maharashtra and two houses, The Maharashtra Legislative Council (Maharashtra Vidhan Parishad) and The Maharashtra Legislative Assembly (Maharashtra Vidhan Sabha). The governor in his role as head of the legislature has full powers to summon and prorogue either house of legislature or to dissolve the Legislative Assembly.

== Head Leaders ==
| House | Leader | Portrait | Since |
Constitutional Posts
| Governor | Jishnu Dev Varma | | 06 March 2026 |
| Chief Minister | Devendra Fadnavis | | 05 December 2024 |
| First Deputy Chief Minister | Eknath Shinde | | 05 December 2024 |
| Second Deputy Chief Minister | Sunetra Ajit Pawar | | 31 January 2026 |
| Chairperson Maharashtra Legislative Council | Ram Shinde | The Minister of State for Home (Rural), Public Health, Tourism and Marketing of Maharashtra, Prof. Ram Shinde meeting the Union Minister for Human Resource Development, Smt. Smriti Irani, in New Delhi on February 23, 2015 (cropped) | 07 July 2022 |
| Speaker Maharashtra Legislative Assembly | Rahul Narwekar | | 09 December 2024 |
| Deputy Chairperson Maharashtra Legislative Council | Sachin Ahir | | 01 July 2026 |
| Deputy Speaker Maharashtra Legislative Assembly | Anna Bansode | | 25 March 2025 |
| Leader of the House Maharashtra Legislative Assembly | Devendra Fadnavis | | 05 December 2024 |
| Leader of the House Maharashtra Legislative Council | Eknath Shinde | | 09 December 2024 |
| First Deputy Leader of the House Maharashtra Legislative Assembly | Eknath Shinde | | 05 December 2024 |
| Second Deputy Leader of the House Maharashtra Legislative Assembly | Sunetra Ajit Pawar | | 31 January 2026 |
| Deputy Leader of the House of Maharashtra Legislative Council | Pankaja Munde | | 21 December 2024 |
| Leader of the Opposition Maharashtra Legislative Assembly | Vacant | | 26 November 2024 |
| Leader of Opposition Maharashtra Legislative Council | Vacant | | 29 August 2025 |
| First Deputy Leader of Opposition (Maharashtra Legislative Assembly) | Vacant | | 26 November 2024 |
| Second Deputy Leader of Opposition (Maharashtra Legislative Assembly) | Vacant | | 26 November 2024 |
| Deputy Leader of Opposition (Maharashtra Legislative Council) | Vacant | | 29 August 2025 |
| Chief Secretary of Maharashtra | Rajesh Aggarwal | | 01 December 2025 |

== Maharashtra Legislature Leaders ==
| House | Leader | Portrait | Since |
Maharashtra Legislative Posts
| Leader Legislature BJP Party | Devendra Fadnavis | | 19 November 2019 |
| Leader Legislature NCP (SP) Party | Jitendra Awhad | | 3 August 2023 |
| Leader Legislature Congress Party | Vijay Namdevrao Wadettiwar | | 24 December 2024 |
| Leader Legislature SHS Party | Eknath Shinde | | 17 February 2023 |
| Leader Legislature SHS(UBT) Party | Aditya Thackeray | | 26 November 2024 |
| Group Leader Legislature Assembly NCP Party | Sunetra Ajit Pawar | | 31 January 2026 |
Maharashtra Legislative Assembly Posts
| Group Leader Legislature Assembly BJP Party | Devendra Fadnavis | | 19 November 2019 |
| Group Leader Legislature Assembly NCP Party | Sunetra Ajit Pawar | | 28 January 2026 |
| Group Leader Legislature Assembly NCP (SP) Party | Jitendra Awhad | | 3 August 2023 |
| Group Leader Legislature Assembly Congress Party | Vijay Namdevrao Wadettiwar | | 24 December 2024 |
| Group Leader Legislature Assembly SHS Party | Eknath Shinde | | 17 February 2023 |
| Group Leader Legislature Assembly SHS(UBT) Party | Aditya Thackeray | | 26 November 2024 |
| Group Leader Legislature Assembly JSS Party | Vinay Kore | | 2 December 2019 |
| Group Leader Legislature Assembly SP Party | Abu Asim Azmi | | 2 December 2019 |
| Group Leader Legislature Assembly AIMIM Party | Mohammed Ismail Abdul Khalique | | 2 December 2019 |
| Group Leader of Legislative Assembly of Rajarshi Shahu Vikas Aghadi | Rajendra Patil Yadravkar | | 26 November 2024 |
| Group Leader Legislature Assembly CPI(M) Party | Vinod Bhiva Nikole | | 2 December 2019 |
| Group Leader Legislature Assembly PWPI Party | Babasaheb Deshmukh | | 26 November 2024 |
| Group Leader of Legislative Assembly of Rashtriya Yuva Swabhiman Party | Ravi Rana | | 26 November 2024 |
| Group Leader Legislature Assembly RSP Party | Ratnakar Gutte | | 2 December 2019 |
Maharashtra Legislative Council Posts
| Group Leader Legislature Council BJP Party | Pravin Darekar | | 16 December 2019 |
| Group Leader Legislature Council SHS(UBT) Party | Anil Parab | | 7 July 2022 |
| Group Leader Legislature Council NCP (SP) Party | Eknath Khadse | | 11 March 2023 |
| Group Leader Legislature Council NCP Party | Ramraje Naik Nimbalkar | | 7 July 2023 |
| Group Leader Legislature Council Congress Party | Satej Patil | | 2 March 2023 |
| Group Leader Legislature Council JD(U) Party | Kapil Waman Patil | | 2 December 2019 |
| Group Leader Legislature Council PWPI Party | Jayant Prabhakar Patil | | 2 December 2019 |
| Group Leader Legislature Council RSP Party | Mahadev Jankar | | 2 December 2019 |

== See also ==
- Maharashtra Legislature Party of Indian National Congress
- Maharashtra Legislature Party of Bharatiya Janata Party
- Maharashtra Legislature Party of Nationalist Congress Party
- Maharashtra Legislature Party of Shiv Sena
- Maharashtra Legislature Party of Shiv Sena (UBT)
- Maharashtra Legislature Party of Nationalist Congress Party – Sharadchandra Pawar
