= List of leaders of the opposition in the Maharashtra Legislative Council =

Person who leads opposition in legislative council

Leader of the Opposition in Maharashtra Legislative Council
- विरोधी पक्षनेते महाराष्ट्र विधान परिषद
- Seal of the state of Maharashtra
- Incumbent; Vacant since 29 August 2025
- Maharashtra Legislative Council
- Style: The Hon’ble
- Member of: Maharashtra Legislative Council
- Reports to: Government of Maharashtra
- Residence: Mumbai
- Seat: Maharashtra Legislature
- Appointer: Members of the Maharashtra Legislative Council
- Term length: During the life of the vidhan Sabha Six Years maximum
- Inaugural holder: Madhavrao Bayaji Gaikwad (Communist Party of India) (14 July 1960 - 23 March 1962)
- Salary: ₹ - approximately

The leader of the opposition in Maharashtra Legislative Council is an elected Member of Maharashtra Legislative Council who leads the official opposition in the upper house of the bicameral Maharashtra Legislature in India. The leader of the opposition Maharashtra Legislative Council is the chairperson of the party with the most seats after the government party.

Currently, there is no leader of opposition since 29 August 2025 as no opposition party has 10% of seats in the house.

== Leaders of the opposition ==
The council's opposition parties elect a Leader of the Opposition. This is commonly the leader of the largest non-government party, and is recognized as such by the chairperson. The following is the list of leaders of the opposition in the council.

#	Portrait	Name	Tenure			Chief Minister	Party
1		Madhavrao Gaikwad	14 July 1960	23 March 1962	1 year, 252 days		Communist Party of India
2		Vasudev Gogate	27 July 1962	28 August 1966	4 years, 32 days		Bharatiya Jana Sangh
3		Ramjeevan Choudhary	29 August 1966	21 July 1967	326 days		Bharatiya Jana Sangh
4		Uttamrao Patil	22 July 1967	26 March 1978	10 years, 247 days	Vasantrao Naik Shankarrao Chavan Vasantdada Patil	Bharatiya Jana Sangh
5		Arjunrao Kasture	27 March 1978	19 July 1978	114 days	Vasantdada Patil	Indian Congress (Socialist)
6		Ram Meghe	28 July 1978	9 July 1980	1 year, 347 days	Sharad Pawar	Indian National Congress
7		Ganesh Pradhan	9 July 1980	7 September 1982	2 years, 60 days	A. R. Antulay Babasaheb Bhosale	Indian Congress (Socialist)
8		Datta Meghe	7 September 1982	16 November 1984	2 years, 70 days	Babasaheb Bhosale Vasantdada Patil	Indian Congress (Socialist)
9		Devidas Karale	17 November 1984	12 December 1986	2 years, 25 days	Vasantdada Patil Shivajirao Patil Nilangekar Shankarrao Chavan	Indian Congress (Socialist)
10		R. S. Gavai	12 December 1986	20 December 1988	2 years, 8 days	Shankarrao Chavan Sharad Pawar	Republican Party of India
11		Vithalrao Hande	23 December 1988	20 December 1990	1 year, 362 days	Sharad Pawar	Peasants and Workers Party of India
(10)		R. S. Gavai	20 December 1990	17 July 1991	209 days	Sharad Pawar Sudhakarrao Naik	Republican Party of India
12		Pramod Navalkar	17 July 1991	2 July 1992	351 days	Sudhakarrao Naik	Shiv Sena
13		Anna Dange	2 July 1992	30 July 1993	1 year, 28 days	Sudhakarrao Naik Sharad Pawar	Bharatiya Janata Party
14		Sudhir Joshi	30 July 1993	30 July 1994	1 year, 0 days	Sharad Pawar	Shiv Sena
(13)		Anna Dange	30 July 1994	18 March 1995	231 days	Sharad Pawar	Bharatiya Janata Party
15		Sharad Pawar	25 March 1995	21 May 1996	1 year, 57 days	Manohar Joshi	Indian National Congress
16		Chhagan Bhujbal	10 July 1996	9 June 1999	3 years, 99 days	Manohar Joshi Narayan Rane	Indian National Congress
16		Chhagan Bhujbal	10 June 1999	17 October 1999	3 years, 99 days	Narayan Rane	Nationalist Congress Party
17		Nitin Gadkari	23 October 1999	11 April 2005	5 years, 170 days	Vilasrao Deshmukh Sushilkumar Shinde Vilasrao Deshmukh	Bharatiya Janata Party
18		Pandurang Fundkar	11 April 2005	22 December 2011	6 years, 255 days	Vilasrao Deshmukh Ashok Chavan Prithviraj Chavan	Bharatiya Janata Party
19		Vinod Tawde	23 December 2011	20 October 2014	2 years, 301 days	Prithviraj Chavan	Bharatiya Janata Party
20		Dhananjay Munde	22 December 2014	24 October 2019	4 years, 306 days	Devendra Fadnavis	Nationalist Congress Party
21		Pravin Darekar	16 December 2019	29 June 2022	2 years, 195 days	Uddhav Thackeray	Bharatiya Janata Party
22		Ambadas Danve	9 August 2022	29 August 2025	3 years, 20 days	Eknath Shinde; Devendra Fadnavis	Shiv Sena (UBT)
Vacant			29 August 2025	Incumbent	1 year, 85 days	Devendra Fadnavis	N/A

== Deputy leaders of the opposition ==
№	Portrait	Name	Term of office			Chairmen of the House	Party
-		Niranjan Davkhare	16 December 2019	29 June 2022	2 years, 195 days	Ramraje Naik Nimbalkar; Neelam Gorhe (acting)	Bharatiya Janata Party
-		Bhai Jagtap	17 August 2022	29 August 2025	3 years, 12 days	Neelam Gorhe (acting); Ram Shinde	Indian National Congress

== See also ==
- List of chief ministers of Maharashtra
- List of leaders of the house in the Maharashtra Legislative Council
- List of leaders of the opposition in the Maharashtra Legislative Assembly
