= Sakharam =

Sakharam is a name. People with the name include:

== Given name ==
- Sakharam Binder
- Sakharam Arjun
- Sakharam Bapu Bokil
- Sakharam Barve
- Sakharam Hari Gupte
- Sakharam Rao
- Sakharam Ganesh Pandit
- Sakharam Narayan Kamat Wagh

== Middle name ==
- Yashvantrao Sakharam Desale
- Ramchandra Sakharam Ruikar
- Vishnu Sakharam Khandekar
- Vitthal Sakharam Page
- Govind Sakharam Sardesai
- Ramesh Sakharam Benegal

== Surname ==
- Bhoye Harishchandra Sakharam

== See also ==
- Ramchandra Sakharam Ruikar All India Forward Bloc
- Narayan Rao#Sakharam Bapu
