= Ravindra Chavan =

Indian politician

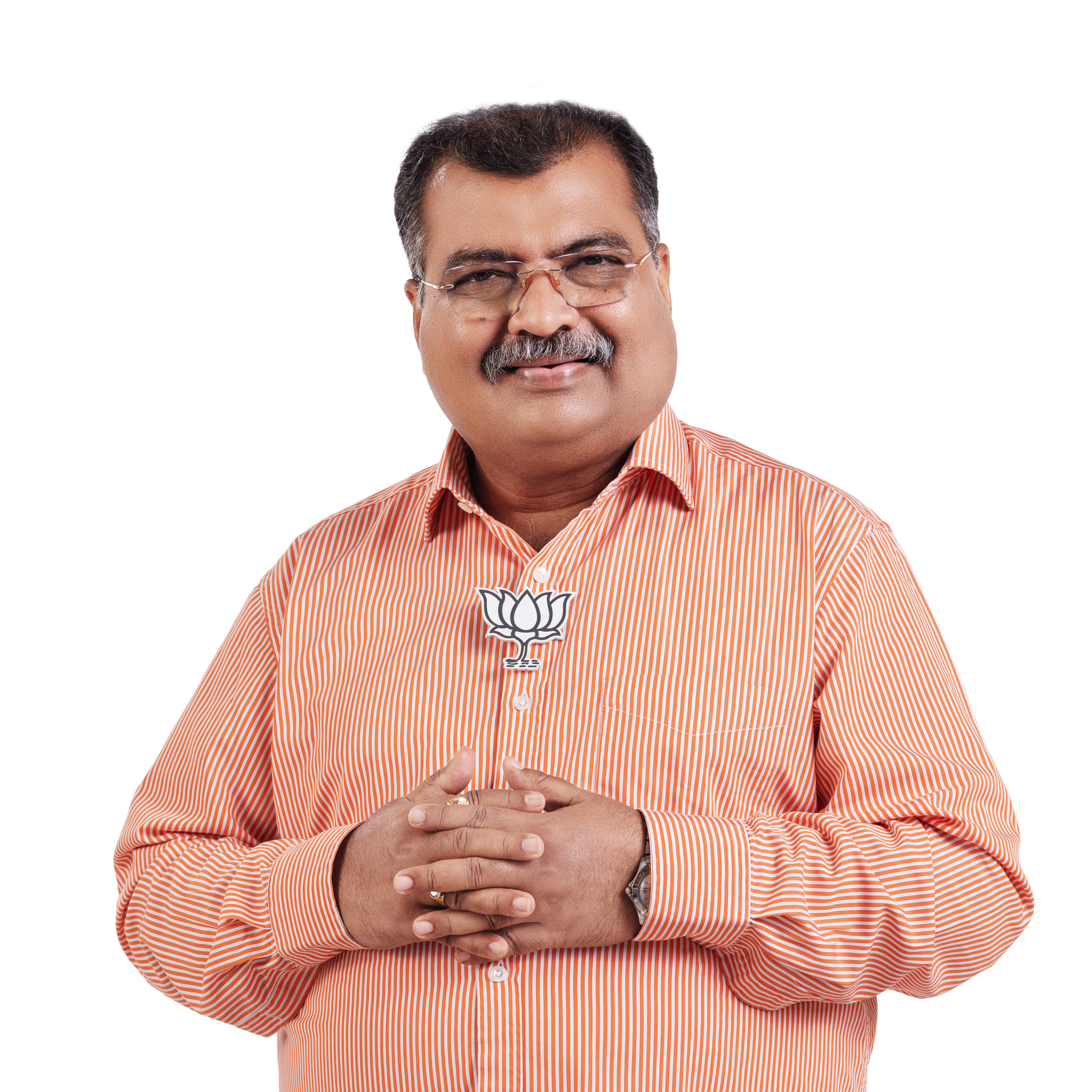
- Ravindra Chavan

President of Bharatiya Janata Party – Maharashtra
- Incumbent
- Assumed office 1 July 2025; Working: 11 January–1 July 2025
- National President: Nitin Nabin (20 January 2026-Current); JP Nadda (20 January 2020- 20 January 2026)
- Preceded by: Chandrashekhar Bawankule
- Constituency: 143 Dombivli - 5 December, 2024

Minister of Public Works Government of Maharashtra
- In office 9 August 2022 – 26 November 2024
- Chief Minister: Eknath Shinde
- Preceded by: Ashok Chavan
- Succeeded by: Shivendra Raje Bhosale

Ministry of Food, Civil Supplies & Consumer Protection Government of Maharashtra
- In office 9 August 2022 – 2 July 2023
- Chief Minister: Eknath Shinde
- Preceded by: Chhagan Bhujbal
- Succeeded by: Chhagan Bhujbal

Minister of state Government of Maharashtra
- In office 8 July 2016 – 8 November 2019
- Chief Minister: Devendra Fadnavis
- Department: Ports; Information Technology; Medical Education; Food, Civil Supplies & Consumer Protection

Member of Maharashtra Legislative Assembly
- Incumbent
- Assumed office 2009
- Preceded by: Constituency created
- Constituency: Dombivli

Personal details
- Born: 20 September 1970 (age 56) Mumbai, Maharashtra, India
- Party: Bharatiya Janata Party
- Spouse: Suhasi Chavan
- Children: 2 daughters (Saloni & Khushi)
- Parent: Dattatray Chavan (father)
- Occupation: Politician

Ravindra Dattatray Chavan (September 20, 1970) is an Indian politician affiliated with the Bharatiya Janata Party (BJP). Currently serves as the President of the BJP Maharashtra unit. He serves as an MLA representing the Dombivli Assembly constituency in the Maharashtra Legislative Assembly, having won elections in 2009, 2014, 2019 and 2024. He served as a cabinet minister in the Eknath Shinde-led government in Maharashtra, handling the portfolios of the Public Works Department (excluding Public Undertakings) and the Food, Civil Supplies, and Consumer Protection departments.

He also served as the Guardian Minister for Palghar and Sindhudurg districts. Previously, he held the position of Cabinet Minister for Ports, Information and Technology, Medical Education, and Food, Civil Supplies, and Consumer Protection from 2016 to 2019.

In 2020, Chavan was appointed as the General Secretary of the BJP's Maharashtra unit. On 11 January 2025, he was appointed as the Working President of the Bharatiya Janata Party, Maharashtra.

== Early life ==
Ravindra Chavan completed his schooling in Mumbai. He completed his 12th standard education and pursued further studies at Yashwantrao Chavan Maharashtra Open University, Nashik.

== Political career ==
In 2002, Ravindra Chavan was appointed as the Kalyan Sub-District President of the Bharatiya Janata Yuva Morcha. In 2005, he was elected as a corporator in the Kalyan-Dombivli Municipal Corporation, representing the Savarkar Road ward in Dombivli. In 2007, he became the Chairman of the Standing Committee of the Kalyan-Dombivli Municipal Corporation.

During his tenure as a corporator, Chavan was elected as the first Member of the Legislative Assembly (MLA) from the Dombivli Assembly constituency in 2009, defeating Rajesh Kadam of the Maharashtra Navnirman Sena and securing 61,104 votes on the ticket of the Shiv Sena-BJP alliance.

Chavan won the Maharashtra Assembly elections in 2014 and 2019. In the 2019 Maharashtra legislative elections, he won by receiving the highest number of votes in the Konkan region of Maharashtra. In 2016, he was appointed Cabinet Minister in Maharashtra government, with the portfolio of Ports, Information Technology, Medical Education, and Food, Civil Supplies, and Consumer Protection. In February 2018, Chavan was appointed as the Guardian Minister of Raigad district, succeeding Prakash Mehta. In July 2019, Chavan was also appointed the Guardian Minister of Palghar district.

Following the dissolution of the BJP-Shiv Sena alliance and the establishment of the Maha Vikas Aghadi government, Chavan continued to serve as an MLA and was appointed General Secretary of the Bharatiya Janata Party, Maharashtra in July 2020. In 2022, he was appointed as a Cabinet Minister in the Shinde-Fadnavis government, responsible for the Ministry of Public Works (excluding Public Undertakings). In September 2022, the Shinde-led government appointed him as Guardian Minister of Palghar district and Sindhudurg district.

In 2024, Ravindra Chavan was re-elected from the Dombivli Assembly constituency for the fourth consecutive term, with a margin of 77,106 votes.

=== As In-Charge of BJP’s Sangathan Parv Campaign – ===
On 28 December 2024, Ravindra Chavan was appointed as the State In-Charge of the BJP Maharashtra Sangathan Parv Abhiyan (Organizational Expansion Campaign). Between 1 January 2025 and 6 April 2025, within just about three months, the party enrolled 1.51 crore primary members and nearly 1.5 lakh active members in Maharashtra. This made the Bharatiya Janata Party the largest political party in the state in terms of membership.

=== As Working President – ===
On 11 January 2025, Ravindra Chavan was appointed as the Working President of BJP Maharashtra.Following this, he successfully led several organizational campaigns, including Sangathan Parv, Mandal Reorganization, and the Gaav-Vasti Sampark Abhiyan (Village & Locality Contact Drive).

=== As State President – ===
On the occasion of Devendra Fadnavis’ birthday, 22 July 2025, a massive state-wide initiative called Maha-Raktadan Sankalp Shibir (Mega Blood Donation Drive) was organized under the leadership of Ravindra Chavan. On a single day, 1,088 blood donation camps were held at the Mandal level, collecting a record 78,313 units of blood.

This initiative set two records in the Asia Book of World Records –

● Highest number of blood donation camps held in a single day.

● Highest units of blood collected in a single day.

Through this, under Ravindra Chavan’s leadership, the BJP broke the previous record held by Shiv Sena.

== Work ==
=== As an MLA ===
In June 2011, Chavan facilitated the confirmation of 285 KDMC workers who were at risk of job termination by addressing a legal issue with KDMC officials. He had previously advocated for a salary increase for these workers in 2007.

In July 2011, Ravindra Chavan led a protest in Kalyan West with over 400 residents against the Maharashtra State Road Development Corporation's delay in completing the 1.5 km Govindwadi bypass. After refusing bail, he was jailed and began a hunger strike demanding action on stalled infrastructure projects, including the Mumbra–Dombivli road.

In August 2011, Ravindra Chavan led a protest, the Taala Thoko Andolan, at the Central Railway Divisional Railway Manager's office in Mumbai to address infrastructure issues in Dombivli. He raised demands for a road over bridge at Thakurli, better parking facilities near Dombivli railway station, and the completion of the Kalyan-Dombivli parallel road, among others. Chavan pledged ₹2 crore from the MLA fund for the Thakurli project. The Central Railway management assured action on the raised concerns.

He organizes the Namo Namo Dandiya event in Dombivli since 2018, attracting up to 50,000 participants daily during Navratri in an air-conditioned venue at the Sawlaram Maharaj Sports Complex.

=== As a Minister ===
As Minister of Food, Civil Supplies, and Consumer Protection, Ravindra Chavan launched the 'Anandacha Shidha' initiative in 2022, which provided subsidized rations to economically disadvantaged families during Diwali.

In 2022, he worked to improve temple infrastructure in the Konkan region, notably at Anganewadi and Kunkeshwar temples, by constructing concrete roads, providing modern sanitation facilities, and enhancing mobile connectivity for devotees.

In 2023, the Project Management Information System (PMIS) was launched by Chavan, serving as the Public Works Department minister, with the goal of improving transparency and streamlining project oversight. He also made efforts to tackle corruption, particularly addressing reported 'cash-for-transfers' practices and strengthening accountability in personnel management. In the same year, Chavan worked on the beautification and infrastructure development project for 12 Konkan Railway stations, with a budget of ₹56.25 crore, to promote tourism in the Konkan region.

From 2021 to 2023, Ravindra Chavan, as the Minister of Public Works, facilitated development works worth ₹92,000 crore through the Public Works Department, focusing on roads, bridges, and buildings across Maharashtra. He also made the distribution of free solar power units to housing societies in Dombivli under the Central Government's Renewable Energy Sources Scheme, benefiting 268 housing complexes and encouraging the adoption of solar energy in the region. Chavan addressed the long-standing delays in the Mumbai-Goa highway project, which had been delayed for 12 years. Under his leadership, land acquisition issues were resolved, and the residents of Konkan, who had contributed land, received compensation.

In 2024, while serving as Guardian Minister, Chavan facilitated the resettlement of 70 homeless Katkari families in Sindhudurg district by providing land for building homes. He was appointed as the Working President of the Bharatiya Janata Party, Maharashtra, on January 11, 2025.

== Positions held ==
#	From	To	Position	Refs.
01	2002	2005	Kalyan Sub-District President, Bharatiya Janata Yuva Morcha	
02	2005	2009	Corporator, Kalyan-Dombivli Municipal Corporation, Savarkar Road Ward	
03	2007	2009	Chairman, Standing Committee, Kalyan-Dombivli Municipal Corporation	
04	2009	Present	Member of Legislative Assembly (MLA), Dombivli Constituency for fourth term	
05	2016	2019	Cabinet Minister, Maharashtra Government, with portfolios of Ports, Information Technology, Medical Education, and Food, Civil Supplies and Consumer Protection	
06	2018	2019	Guardian Minister of Raigad District	
07	2019	2019	Guardian Minister of Palghar District	
08	2020	2024	General Secretary, Bharatiya Janata Party, Maharashtra	
09	2022	2024	Cabinet Minister, Ministry of Public Works (excluding Public Undertakings), Government of Maharashtra	
10	2022	2024	Guardian Minister of Palghar and Sindhudurg Districts, Maharashtra	
11	2022	2023	Minister of Food, Civil Supplies & Consumer Protection, Government of Maharashtra	
12	2025	Present	President of Bharatiya Janata Party – Maharashtra	
