= Tilak (name) =

Tilak is a masculine given name or surname. Notable people with the name include:

== Given name ==
- Tilak Ram Acharya, Nepali educator and academic administrator
- Tilak Raj Behar, Indian politician
- Tilak Bhandari (born 2004), Nepali cricketer
- Tilak Kumar Chakraborty, Indian politician
- Tilak Goonaratne, Sri Lankan civil servant and diplomat
- Tilak Ram Gupta, Indian politician
- Tilak Jayaratne, broadcaster, teacher, and writer
- Tilak Marapana, Sri Lankan lawyer
- Tilak Pariyar, Nepali politician
- Tilak Raj Prabhakar, Indian mathematician
- Tilak Raj, Indian cricketer
- Tilak Ratnayake, former governor of Uva Province, Sri Lanka
- Tilak Ram Sharma, Nepali politician
- Tilak Shekar, Indian actor
- Tilak Ram Tharu, Nepali track and field athlete
- Tilak Varma (born 2002), Indian cricketer
- Tilak Weerasooriya, Sri Lankan physician and professor

== Surname ==
- Bal Gangadhar Tilak, Indian nationalist and self-rule activist
- Christopher Tilak, Indian politician
- Devarakonda Balagangadhara Tilak, Indian poet and fiction writer
- Jayant Shridhar Tilak, Indian politician
- K. B. Tilak, Indian independence activist and film producer
- Lakshmibai Tilak, India-based writer
- Mukta Tilak, Indian politician
- Narayan Vaman Tilak, British India poet
- Raghukul Tilak, former governor of Rajasthan, India
- Raj Joshi Tilak (born 1936), Indian sprinter
- Rajni Tilak, Indian activist
- Shridhar Balwant Tilak, India-based activist and writer
- Suyash Tilak, Indian actor
