= Ministry of Public Works (Excluding Public Undertakings) (Maharashtra) =

Maharashtra government body

Ministry of Public Works (Excluding Public Undertakings) Government of Maharashtra
- मंत्रालय सार्वजनिक बांधकाम (सार्वजनिक उपक्रम वगळून) विभाग, महाराष्ट्र शासन
- Seal of the state of Maharashtra

- Building of Administrative Headquarters of Mumbai

Ministry overview
- Jurisdiction: (India) Maharashtra
- Headquarters: Mantralay, Mumbai
- Minister responsible: Shivendra Raje Bhosale, Cabinet Minister
- Deputy Minister responsible: Indranil Naik, Minister of State
- Ministry executive: (IAS)
- Parent department: Government of Maharashtra

The Ministry of Public Works (Excluding Public Undertakings) is a Ministry of the Government of Maharashtra state.

The Ministry is headed by a cabinet level Minister. Shivendra Raje Bhosale is Current Minister of Public Works (Excluding Public Undertakings) Government of Maharashtra.

== List ==
#	Portrait	Minister	Constituency	Term of office			Chief Minister	Party
1		Marotrao Kannamwar	Saoli	1 May 1960	20 November 1962	3 years, 207 days	Yashwantrao Chavan	Indian National Congress
1		Marotrao Kannamwar	Saoli	20 November 1962	24 November 1963	3 years, 207 days	himself	Indian National Congress
2		P. K. Sawant	Chiplun	25 November 1963	5 December 1963	10 days	himself	Indian National Congress
3		S. K. Wankhede	Sawargaon	5 December 1963	1 March 1967	3 years, 86 days	Vasantrao Naik	Indian National Congress
4		Balasaheb Desai	Patan	1 March 1967	13 March 1972	5 years, 12 days	Vasantrao Naik	Indian National Congress
5		Madhukar Dhanaji Chaudhari	Raver	13 March 1972	21 February 1975	2 years, 345 days	Vasantrao Naik	Indian National Congress
6		A. R. Antulay	Shrivardhan	21 February 1975	17 May 1977	2 years, 85 days	Shankarrao Chavan	Indian National Congress
7		Sundarrao Solanke	Majalgaon	17 May 1977	18 July 1978	1 year, 62 days	Vasantdada Patil	Indian National Congress
8		Chhedilal Gupta		18 July 1978	17 February 1980	1 year, 214 days	Sharad Pawar	Janata Party
9		Shalini Patil		9 June 1980	21 January 1982	1 year, 226 days	A. R. Antulay	Indian National Congress
10		Surupsingh Hirya Naik	Navapur	21 January 1982	2 February 1983	1 year, 12 days	Babasaheb Bhosale	Indian National Congress
11		Ramprasad Kadam Bordikar		2 February 1983	3 June 1985	2 years, 121 days	Vasantdada Patil	Indian National Congress
(10)		Surupsingh Hirya Naik	Navapur	3 June 1985	12 March 1986	282 days	Shivajirao Patil Nilangekar	Indian National Congress
12		Vilasrao Deshmukh	Latur City	12 March 1986	26 June 1988	2 years, 106 days	Shankarrao Chavan	Indian National Congress
13		Vijaysinh Mohite–Patil	Malshiras	26 June 1988	4 March 1990	4 years, 253 days	Sharad Pawar	Indian National Congress
13		Vijaysinh Mohite–Patil	Malshiras	4 March 1990	25 June 1991	4 years, 253 days	Sharad Pawar	Indian National Congress
13		Vijaysinh Mohite–Patil	Malshiras	25 June 1991	6 March 1993	4 years, 253 days	Sudhakarrao Naik	Indian National Congress
14		Shivajirao Deshmukh	MLC	6 March 1993	14 March 1995	2 years, 8 days	Sharad Pawar	Indian National Congress
15		Nitin Gadkari	MLC	14 March 1995	1 February 1999	4 years, 218 days	Manohar Joshi	Bharatiya Janata Party
15		Nitin Gadkari	MLC	1 February 1999	18 October 1999	4 years, 218 days	Narayan Rane	Bharatiya Janata Party
(13)		Vijaysinh Mohite–Patil	Malshiras	18 October 1999	18 January 2003	3 years, 92 days	Vilasrao Deshmukh	Nationalist Congress Party
16		Chhagan Bhujbal	MLC	18 January 2003	1 November 2004	11 years, 253 days	Sushilkumar Shinde	Nationalist Congress Party
16		Chhagan Bhujbal	Yevla	1 November 2004	8 December 2008	11 years, 253 days	Vilasrao Deshmukh	Nationalist Congress Party
16		Chhagan Bhujbal	Yevla	8 December 2008	11 November 2010	11 years, 253 days	Ashok Chavan	Nationalist Congress Party
16		Chhagan Bhujbal	Yevla	11 November 2010	28 September 2014	11 years, 253 days	Prithviraj Chavan	Nationalist Congress Party
17		Chandrakant Patil	MLC	31 October 2014	12 November 2019	5 years, 12 days	Devendra Fadnavis	Bharatiya Janata Party
18		Nitin Raut	Nagpur North	28 November 2019	30 December 2019	32 days	Uddhav Thackeray	Indian National Congress
19		Ashok Chavan	Bhokar	30 December 2019	30 June 2022	2 years, 182 days	Uddhav Thackeray	Indian National Congress
20		Eknath Shinde	Kopri-Pachpakhadi	30 June 2022	9 August 2022	40 days	himself	Shiv Sena (2022–present)
21		Ravindra Chavan	Dombivli	9 August 2022	26 November 2024	2 years, 109 days	Eknath Shinde	Bharatiya Janata Party
22		Shivendra Raje Bhosale	Satara	15 December 2024	incumbent	1 year, 287 days	Devendra Fadnavis	Bharatiya Janata Party

== Ministers of State ==
No.	Portrait	Deputy Minister (Constituency)	Term of office			Political party	Ministry	Minister	Chief Minister
No.	Portrait	Deputy Minister (Constituency)	From	To	Period	Political party	Ministry	Minister	Chief Minister
Deputy Minister of Public Works (excluding Public Undertakings)
Vacant			23 November 2019	28 November 2019	5 days	NA	Fadnavis II	Devendra Fadnavis	Devendra Fadnavis
01		Dattatray Vithoba Bharne (MLA for Indapur Constituency No. 200- Pune District (Legislative Assembly)	30 December 2019	29 June 2022	2 years, 181 days	Nationalist Congress Party	Thackeray	Ashok Chavan	Uddhav Thackeray
Vacant			30 June 2022	26 November 2024	2 years, 149 days	NA	Eknath	Eknath Shinde (2022 - 2022); Ravindra Chavan (2022–2024)	Eknath Shinde
02		Indranil Naik (MLA for Pusad Constituency No. 81- Yavatmal District) (Legislative Assembly)	21 December 2024	Incumbent	1 year, 281 days	Nationalist Congress Party (Ajit Pawar Group)	Fadnavis III	Shivendra Raje Bhosale (2024 – Present)	Devendra Fadnavis

== List of Ministers For Buildings(1960 - 1977) ==
No.	Portrait	Minister (Constituency)	Term of office			Political party	Ministry	Chief Minister
No.	Portrait	Minister (Constituency)	From	To	Period	Political party	Ministry	Chief Minister
Minister of Buildings
Starting on 1 May 1960
01		Marotrao Kannamwar (MLA for Saoli Constituency No. 73- Chandrapur District) (Legislative Assembly)	01 May 1960	07 March 1962	1 year, 310 days	Indian National Congress	Yashwantrao I	Yashwantrao Chavan
02		Marotrao Kannamwar (MLA for Saoli Constituency No. 73- Chandrapur District) (Legislative Assembly)	08 March 1962	19 November 1962	256 days	Indian National Congress	Yashwantrao II	Yashwantrao Chavan
03		Marotrao Kannamwar (MLA for Saoli Constituency No. 73- Chandrapur District) (Legislative Assembly) (Chief Minister)	20 November 1962	24 November 1963	1 year, 4 days	Indian National Congress	Kannamwar l	Marotrao Kannamwar
04		P. K. Sawant (MLA for Chiplun Constituency No. 265- Ratnagiri District) (Legislative Assembly) (Interim Chief Minister)	25 November 1962	04 December 1963	9 days	Indian National Congress	Sawant I	P. K. Sawant
05		Madhukar Dhanaji Chaudhari (MLA for Raver Constituency No. 11- Jalgaon District) (Legislative Assembly)	05 December 1963	01 March 1967	3 years, 86 days	Indian National Congress	Vasantrao I	Vasantrao Naik
06		Madhukar Dhanaji Chaudhari (MLA for Raver Constituency No. 11- Jalgaon District) (Legislative Assembly)	01 March 1967	13 March 1972	5 years, 12 days	Indian National Congress	Vasantrao II	Vasantrao Naik
07		Yashwantrao Mohite (MLA for Raver Constituency No. 11- Jalgaon District) (Legislative Assembly)	13 March 1972	21 February 1975	2 years, 345 days	Indian National Congress	Vasantrao III	Vasantrao Naik
08		Abdul Rahman Antulay (MLA for Shrivardhan Constituency No. 193- Raigad District) (Legislative Assembly)	21 February 1975	17 May 1977	2 years, 85 days	Indian National Congress	Shankarrao I	Shankarrao Chavan
Ending on 16 April 1977
