= Pankaja Munde =

Indian politician (born 1979)

Pankaja Gopinath Munde

Cabinet Minister Government of Maharashtra
- Incumbent
- Assumed office 15 December 2024
- Minister: Environment and Climate Change; Animal Husbandry
- Chief Minister: Devendra Fadnavis
- Guardian Minister: Jalna District
- Preceded by: Eknath Shinde (Environment and Climate Change); Radhakrishna Vikhe Patil (Animal Husbandry)

Deputy Leader of the House, Maharashtra Legislative Council
- Incumbent
- Assumed office 21 December 2024
- Chief Minister: Devendra Fadnavis
- Leader of the House: Eknath Shinde
- Preceded by: Uday Samant
- In office 9 July 2016 – 12 November 2019
- Chief Minister: Devendra Fadnavis
- Leader of the House: Chandrakant Patil
- Preceded by: Chandrakant Patil
- Succeeded by: Subhash Desai

Member of Maharashtra Legislative Council
- Incumbent
- Assumed office 28 July 2024
- Governor: C. P. Radhakrishnan, Acharya Devvrat
- Chairperson of Council: Neelam Gorhe (additional charge)
- Preceded by: Nilay Naik
- Constituency: Elected by Members of Legislative Assembly

National Secretary of Bharatiya Janata Party
- Incumbent
- Assumed office 26 September 2020
- President: J. P. Nadda

Minister of Rural Development and Panchayat Raj Department, Government of Maharashtra
- In office 31 October 2014 – 12 November 2019
- Chief Minister: Devendra Fadnavis
- Guardian Ministers: Beed District
- Preceded by: Jayant Patil; R. R. Patil (Guardian Minister)
- Succeeded by: Devendra Fadnavis; Dhananjay Munde (Guardian Minister)

Minister of Women and Child Development, Government of Maharashtra
- In office 31 October 2014 – 12 November 2019
- Governor: C. Vidyasagar Rao; Bhagat Singh Koshyari
- Chief Minister: Devendra Fadnavis
- Preceded by: Varsha Gaikwad
- Succeeded by: Devendra Fadnavis

Minister of Earthquake Rehabilitation, Government of Maharashtra
- In office 8 July 2016 – 12 November 2019
- Governor: C. Vidyasagar Rao; Bhagat Singh Koshyari
- Chief Minister: Devendra Fadnavis
- Preceded by: Devendra Fadnavis
- Succeeded by: Devendra Fadnavis

Minister of Tourism, Government of Maharashtra
- Additional Charge
- In office 4 June 2016 – 8 July 2016
- Governor: C. Vidyasagar Rao
- Chief Minister: Devendra Fadnavis
- Preceded by: Devendra Fadnavis
- Succeeded by: Jayakumar Jitendrasinh Rawal

Minister of Animal Husbandry, Fisheries and Dairy Development, Government of Maharashtra
- Additional Charge
- In office 4 June 2016 – 8 July 2016
- Governor: C. Vidyasagar Rao
- Chief Minister: Devendra Fadnavis
- Preceded by: Eknath Khadse
- Succeeded by: Mahadev Jankar

Minister of Soil and Water Conservation, Government of Maharashtra
- In office 31 October 2014 – 8 July 2016
- Governor: C. Vidyasagar Rao
- Chief Minister: Devendra Fadnavis
- Preceded by: Shashikant Shinde
- Succeeded by: Ram Shinde

Minister of Employment Guarantee, Government of Maharashtra
- In office 31 October 2014 – 8 July 2016
- Governor: C. Vidyasagar Rao
- Chief Minister: Devendra Fadnavis
- Preceded by: Jitendra Awhad
- Succeeded by: Jayakumar Jitendrasinh Rawal

Minister of Public Health and Family Welfare, Government of Maharashtra
- In office 31 October 2014 – 5 December 2014
- Governor: C. Vidyasagar Rao
- Chief Minister: Devendra Fadnavis
- Preceded by: Suresh Shetty
- Succeeded by: Deepak Sawant

Member of Maharashtra Legislative Assembly
- In office 2009–2019
- Preceded by: constituency established
- Succeeded by: Dhananjay Munde
- Constituency: Parli

Personal details
- Born: 26 July 1979 (age 47) Parli Vaijnath, Maharashtra, India
- Spouse: Amit Palwe (m. 2001)
- Relations: Pritam Munde (sister); Pramod Mahajan (uncle); Poonam Mahajan (cousin)
- Parent: Gopinath Munde (father)
- Profession: Politician, Social Activist
- Website: www.pankajagopinathmunde.com

Pankaja Gopinathrao Munde (born 26 July 1979) is an Indian politician from Maharashtra. She is eldest daughter of the late Gopinath Munde, a former central cabinet minister of India and former Deputy Chief Minister of Maharashtra. She is the National Secretary of the Bharatiya Janata Party (BJP) and also serves as an MLC in the Maharashtra Legislative Council. She is currently serving as Cabinet Minister for Animal Husbandry, Environment and Climate change in the Third Fadnavis ministry.

== Early life ==
Pankaja Munde was born to Gopinath Munde and Pradnya Munde on 26 July 1979 as their eldest child. She has two younger sisters, Pritam Munde and Yashashari. She completed her graduation and also holds an MBA. from USA.

She is a niece of Pramod Mahajan, and a cousin to Rahul Mahajan and Poonam Mahajan. NCP Nationalist Congress Party leader Dhananjay Munde is also her cousin.

== Political career ==
Gopinath Munde, Pankaja Munde's father, served as the Deputy Chief Minister of Maharashtra in the 1990s. Pankaja Munde herself has held several significant positions in Maharashtra politics. She was the Minister of Rural Development, Women, and Child Welfare in the Devendra Fadnavis cabinet. Besides her political career, she is recognised as a sugar factory and banking businesswoman. In 2017, she received ‘The Powerful Politician’ award and was known as Maharashtra’s prominent and dynamic leader.

In 2012, Pankaja Munde served as the State President of the Bharatiya Janata Yuva Morcha (BJYM), the BJP’s youth wing. She was elected to the Maharashtra Legislative Assembly from the Parli constituency in 2009. She took oath as a Maharashtra Cabinet Minister on 31 October 2014, being allotted the Ministry of Rural Development, Women, and Child Welfare.

Pankaja Munde also established a memorial for her father, Gopinath Munde, in Parli, Beed district. The 20-foot-tall statue, called Gopinath Gad, is located on the premises of the Vaidyanath Cooperative Sugar Mill and was inaugurated by Amit Shah and Devendra Fadnavis. Through the Gopinath Gad Prathisthan, several social activities, such as drought relief, skill development, and education scholarships, have been initiated.'

On Gopinath Munde's seventh death anniversary, the Government of India unveiled a unique postal cover in his honour. The cover was inaugurated virtually by BJP National President JP Nadda and Union Telecom Minister Ravi Shankar Prasad, highlighting Gopinath Munde's efforts to bring the party closer to Dalits and deprived classes in Maharashtra.

In 2022, Pankaja Munde led the BJP to victory in the Nagar Panchayat elections in the Beed district. The BJP emerged as the top party by winning all four Nagar Panchayats, showcasing her effective leadership and the public's support for her.

In September 2023, she respectfully embarked on the 'Shivshakti Parikrama,' a sacred journey where she visited 11 revered temples of Jyotirlinga and Shaktipeethas located in 10 districts of the state. Throughout her pilgrimage, she was warmly welcomed and received enthusiastic support from the people.

Pankaja Munde contested the Beed constituency as the BJP candidate in the 2024 General Elections but lost to Bajrang Manohar Sonwane of the Nationalist Congress Party (NCP). On 12 July 2024, Pankaja Munde emerged victorious in the Maharashtra Legislative Council elections. She also holds the position of a national secretary (BJP) and incharge of the Madhya Pradesh.

== Controversy ==
In June 2015, the opposition party, Indian National Congress, accused Pankaja Munde of being involved in the chikki scam, alleging that she had flouted norms by clearing the purchase without floating tenders. Munde rejected the accusations of corruption, arguing that a policy for an online tendering system was not in place when she commissioned the purchase. Chief Minister Devendra Fadnavis also defended her, stating that the norm of inviting e-tenders was introduced by his government in April, two months after Munde cleared the contracts. Munde challenged the opposition, saying, "If proven guilty, I shall not just resign, but quit politics permanently if I’ve taken even a rupee from anyone."

After a few days, the Anti-Corruption Bureau of Maharashtra gave a clean chit to Pankaja Munde in connection with the 206 crore Chikki scandal alleged by the opposition. It said the tender was given in compliance with the court's rules, with no facts in this regard.

== Personal life ==
Pankaja is married to Amit Palwe. The couple has one son whose name is Aryaman. She has authored a photobiography of her father, titled Lokneta Gopinath Munde.

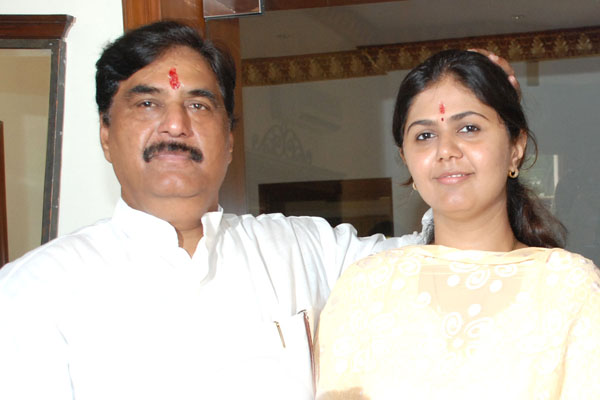
Pankaja Munde and Gopinath Munde 2009 Loksabha Result.

She is a political figure belonging to the dominant Vanjari community of Maharashtra and has held significant roles in Bharatiya Janata Party.

== Dasara (Dussehra) Melava ==
The tradition of Dasara (Dussehra) Melava is a testament to the unity and strength of the collective Hindu communities. It was initiated by Gopinath Munde twenty-five years ago at Bhagwangad, the 'Samadhi' and spiritual residence of the great Varkari Saint Bhagwan Baba. During this Melava, Gopinath Munde addressed the community, setting new directions and conditions, known as 'Shimoullanghan,' symbolising the start of something new.

After his death, his successor, daughter Pankaja Munde, took over the tradition. In 2016, due to a dispute with the Mahant of the Gad, Pankaja Munde decided to hold the Dasara Melava at Savargaon, the birthplace of Saint Bhagwan Baba. The Dassara Melava, held with large crowds and great enthusiasm, was successfully continued by Pankaja Munde in Savargaon.

Bhagwangad is a place of power for every hindu community who respect and follow the Varkari Sampraday. Over the years, many notable figures have attended the rally and addressed the gathering, including veterans like Sambhaji Raje, Amit Shah, Prakash Yashwant Ambedkar, Mahadev Jankar, Eknath Khadse and many other monks and saints.

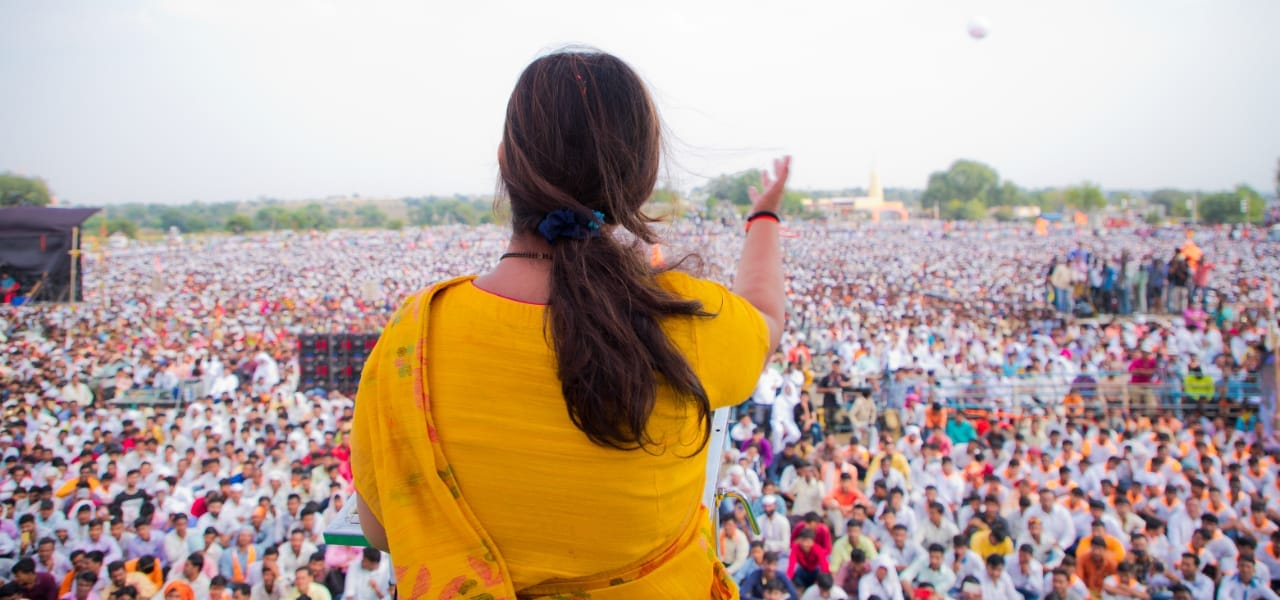
Dussera Meet in Beed (2024)

Political offices
Preceded by Jayant Patil	Cabinet Minister for Rural Development, Maharashtra State; December 2014– November 2019	Succeeded by Devendra Fadnavis
Preceded by Varsha Gaikwad	Cabinet Minister for Women and Child Development, Maharashtra State; December 2014– November 2019	Succeeded by Devendra Fadnavis
Preceded by Harshvardhan Patil	Maharashtra State Guardian Minister for Latur district December 2014– November 2019	Succeeded by Amit Deshmukh
Preceded by R. R. Patil	Maharashtra State Guardian Minister for Beed district December 2014– November 2019	Succeeded by Dhananjay Munde
