= N. S. Pharande =

Indian politician

Professor N. S. Pharande

Chairperson of the Maharashtra Legislative Council
- In office 24 July 1998 – 7 July 2004
- Preceded by: Jayant Shridhar Tilak
- Succeeded by: Shivajirao Deshmukh

Member of Maharashtra Legislative Council
- In office 8 July 1998 – 7 July 2004
- Constituency: elected by Members of Legislative Assembly

President of Bharatiya Janata Party, Maharashtra
- In office 1991–1994
- Preceded by: Gopinath Munde
- Succeeded by: Suryabhan Vahadane-Patil

Professor Narayana Sadashiv Pharande or popularly known as N. S. Pharande was an Indian politician. He was a leader of the Bharatiya Janata Party from Ahmednagar Constituency, Maharashtra.

He was a member of Maharashtra Legislative Council and served as its chairman. His Daughter-in-Law is Devayani Suhas Pharande.
