= Bharatiya Janata Party – Maharashtra =

Maharashtra state affiliate of the Bharatiya Janata Party

- Abbreviation: BJP
- Leader: Devendra Fadnavis (Chief Minister)
- President: Ravindra Chavan
- Headquarters: Dadar, Mumbai, Maharashtra
- Ideology: Integral humanism; Social conservatism; Welfarism; Cultural nationalism; Marathi regionalism
- Political position: Centre-right
- Colours: Saffron
- ECI Status: National Party
- Alliance: NDA
- Seats in Rajya Sabha: 8 / 19
- Seats in Lok Sabha: 9 / 48
- Seats in Maharashtra Legislative Council: 35 / 78
- Seats in Maharashtra Legislative Assembly: 132 / 288

Election symbol
- Lotus

Party flag

Website
- bjpmaharashtra.org

Bharatiya Janata Party – Maharashtra (BJP Maharashtra) is a state unit of the Bharatiya Janata Party in the Indian state of Maharashtra The headquarters is located in Mumbai.

The BJP came into being after a split from the Janata party. The prominent members of BJP had been the part of the Bharatiya Jana Sangh founded by Syama Prasad Mukherjee. Jana Sangh was the political arm of Rashtriya Swayamsevak Sangh and was dissolved in 1977. On 1 July 2025, Ravindra Chavan was appointed by the party leadership as the president of the BJP Maharashtra.

The BJP is aligned with right-wing politics, and its policies adhere to Hindutva, a Hindu nationalist ideology. It has close ideological and organisational links to the Rashtriya Swayamsevak Sangh (RSS). After the 2024 Maharashtra Legislative Assembly Elections held in November 2024 Bharatiya Janata Party is Maharashtra's Biggest Political Party in terms of representation in the Maharashtra Legislative Assembly , in Legislative Council of Maharashtra State and in Rajya Sabha members from Rajya Sabha of Maharashtra.

== Electoral History ==
=== Lok Sabha elections ===
Year	Seats won	+/-
1984	0 / 28	Steady
1989	11 / 48	▲11
1991	5 / 48	▼6
1996	18 / 48	▲2
1998	3 / 48	▼15
1999	13 / 48	▲10
2004	13 / 48	Steady
2009	9 / 48	▼4
2014	23 / 48	▲14
2019	23 / 48	Steady
2024	9 / 48	▼14

=== Vidhan Sabha elections ===
Year	Seats		+/-	Voteshare (%)	+/- (%)	Outcome
Year	Won	Contested	+/-	Voteshare (%)	+/- (%)	Outcome
1980	14 / 288	145	▲14	9.38%	▲9.38%	Opposition
1985	16 / 288	67	▲2	7.25%	▼2.13%	Opposition
1990	42 / 288	104	▲26	10.71%	▲3.46%	Opposition
1995	65 / 288	116	▲23	12.8%	▲2.09%	Government
1999	56 / 288	117	▼9	14.54%	▲1.74%	Opposition
2004	54 / 288	111	▼2	13.67%	▼0.87%	Opposition
2009	46 / 288	119	▼8	14.02%	▲0.35%	Opposition
2014	122 / 288	260	▲76	27.81%	▲13.79%	Government
2019	105 / 288	150	▼17	25.75%	▼2.06%	Opposition, later Government
2024	132 / 288	149	▲27	26.77%	▲1.02%	Government

== Leadership ==
=== Chief Minister ===
#	Portrait	Name	Constituency	Term of Office			Assembly
1		Devendra Fadnavis	Nagpur South West	31 October 2014	12 November 2019	5 years, 12 days	13th
1		Devendra Fadnavis	Nagpur South West	23 November 2019	28 November 2019	5 days	14th
1		Devendra Fadnavis	Nagpur South West	5 December 2024	Incumbent	1 year, 199 days	15th

=== Deputy Chief Ministers ===
#	Portrait	Name	Constituency	Term of Office			Chief Minister
1		Gopinath Munde	Renapur	14 March 1995	18 October 1999	4 years, 218 days	Manohar Joshi; Narayan Rane
2		Devendra Fadnavis	Nagpur South West	30 June 2022	26 November 2024	2 years, 149 days	Eknath Shinde

=== Leader of the Opposition Maharashtra Legislative Assembly ===
#	Portrait	Name	Constituency	Term of Office			Chief Minister
1		Gopinath Munde	Renapur	12 December 1991	14 March 1995	3 years, 92 days	Sudhakarrao Naik; Sharad Pawar
2		Eknath Khadse	Muktainagar	11 November 2009	31 October 2014	4 years, 354 days	Ashok Chavan; Prithviraj Chavan
3		Devendra Fadnavis	Nagpur South West	1 December 2019	29 June 2022	2 years, 210 days	Uddhav Thackeray

=== Leader of the Opposition Maharashtra Legislative Council ===
#	Portrait	Name	Constituency	Term of Office			Chief Minister
1		Anna Dange	MLA's	2 July 1992	30 July 1993	1 year, 255 days	Sudhakarrao Naik; Sharad Pawar
1		Anna Dange	MLA's	30 July 1994	14 March 1995	1 year, 255 days	Sharad Pawar
2		Nitin Gadkari	Nagpur Graduates	23 October 1999	11 April 2005	5 years, 170 days	Vilasrao Deshmukh; Sushilkumar Shinde
3		Pandurang Fundkar	MLA's	11 April 2005	22 December 2011	6 years, 255 days	Vilasrao Deshmukh; Ashok Chavan; Prithviraj Chavan
4		Vinod Tawde	MLA's	23 December 2011	20 October 2014	2 years, 301 days	Prithviraj Chavan
5		Pravin Darekar	MLA's	16 December 2019	29 June 2022	2 years, 195 days	Uddhav Thackeray

=== Party Presidents ===
#	Portrait	Name	Term of Office		
1		Uttamrao Patil	1980	1986	6 years
2		Gopinath Munde	1986	1991	5 years
3		N. S. Pharande	1991	1994	3 years
4		Suryabhan Vahadane	1994	2000	6 years
5		Pandurang Fundkar	2000	2004	4 years
6		Nitin Gadkari	18 November 2004	19 December 2009	5 years, 31 days
7		Sudhir Mungantiwar	3 April 2010	11 April 2013	3 years, 8 days
8		Devendra Fadnavis	11 April 2013	6 January 2015	1 year, 270 days
9		Raosaheb Danve	6 January 2015	16 July 2019	4 years, 191 days
10		Chandrakant Patil	16 July 2019	12 August 2022	3 years, 27 days
11		Chandrashekhar Bawankule	12 August 2022	1 July 2025	2 years, 323 days
12		Ravindra Chavan	1 July 2025 (Note: Worked as Working president from 11 January 2025 - 1 July 2025)	Incumbent	356 days

== Status in Municipal Corporations ==
Corporation	Seats won	Status
Brihanmumbai	89 / 227	Government
Pune	119 / 165	Government
Nagpur	102 / 151	Government
Nashik	72 / 122	Government
Thane	28 / 131	Government
Pimpri-Chinchwad	84 / 128	Government
Kalyan-Dombivli	50 / 122	Government
Vasai-Virar	43 / 115	Opposition
Chhatrapati Sambhajingar	57 / 115	Government
Navi Mumbai	65 / 111	Government
Solapur	87 / 102	Government
Mira-Bhayandar	78 / 95	Government
Bhiwandi-Nizampur	22 / 90	Opposition
Amravati	25 / 87	Government
Nanded-Waghala	45 / 81	Government
Kolhapur	26 / 81	Government
Akola	38 / 80	Government
Panvel	55 / 78	Government
Ulhasnagar	37 / 78	Government
Sangli, Miraj and Kupwad	39 / 78	Government
Malegaon	2 / 84	Opposition
Jalgaon	46 / 75	Government
Latur	22 / 70	Opposition
Dhule	50 / 74	Government
Ahilyanagar	25 / 68	Government
Chandrapur	23 / 66	Government
Parbhani	12 / 65	Opposition
Ichalkaranji	43 / 65	Government
Jalna	41 / 65	Government

== See also ==
- Bharatiya Janata Party
- National Democratic Alliance
- Shiv Sena
- Nationalist Congress Party
- Rashtriya Samaj Paksha
- Maharashtra Navnirman Sena
