= Vidhan Bhavan, Nagpur =

Maharashtra Legislature buikding in India

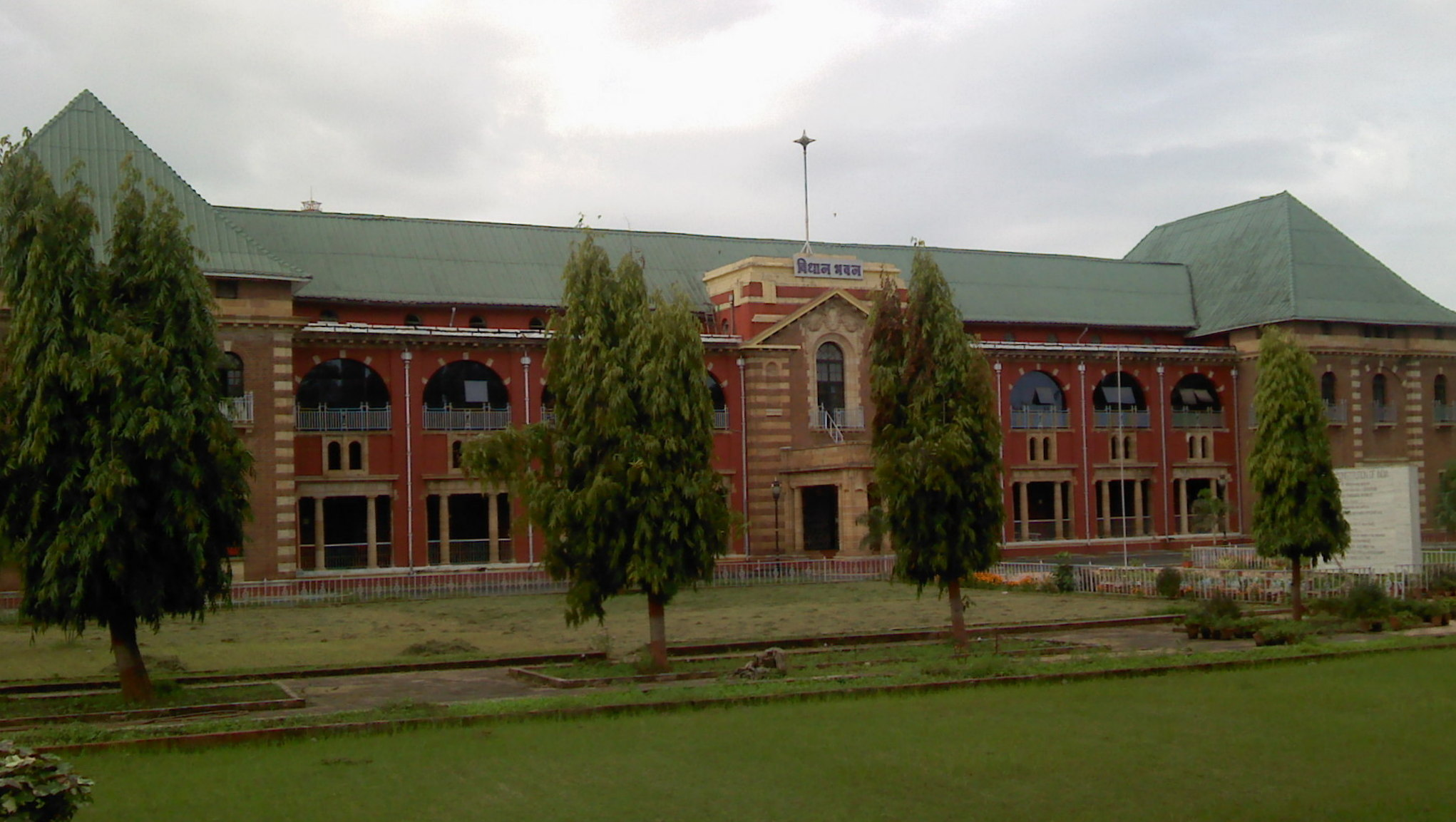
Vidhan Bhavan (State Legislative Assembly) Nagpur

Vidhan Bhavan, Nagpur is the building in the Civil lines locality of Nagpur, the second capital of Maharashtra, a state of India, where the winter session of Maharashtra Legislature is held. The foundation stone of the building was laid in 1912. It was constructed by the then British command to house the administration of the Central Provinces and Berar, of which Nagpur was the capital. Which later was renamed as Madhya Pradesh. Later, in 1952, the CP & Berar was divided into the large central Indian state of Madhya Pradesh which included the current Madhya Pradesh, Chhattisgarh and Vidarbha regions. Nagpur was the capital of this state. In 1956, this state was further divided, with the Vidarbha region going to Maharashtra state. Thus, Nagpur lost its capital status. But, a Nagpur Pact was signed by the Maharashtra state government headed by Yashwantrao Chavan to protect the interests and equal development of the Vidarbha region. Accordingly, Nagpur was made the second capital of the Maharashtra and the winter session of the state legislature was to be held at Nagpur.
