= Nilay Naik =

Nilay Madhukar Naik

Member of Legislative Council Maharashtra
- In office 27 July 2018 – 27 July 2024
- Preceded by: Jaidev Gaikwad, NCP
- Succeeded by: Pankaja Munde, BJP
- Constituency: Elected by Members of Legislative Assembly

Personal details
- Born: 24 March 1963 (age 63) At.Post Gahuli, Tq.Pusad, Dist.Yavatmal District
- Party: Bharatiya Janata Party
- Other political affiliations: Nationalist Congress Party
- Parent: Madhukar Rajusing Naik (Father)

Nilay Madhukar Naik is an Indian politician who is a part of the Bharatiya Janata Party. He is nephew of former Chief Minister of Maharashtra Sudhakarrao Naik & Manohar Naik. He is Grandson of former Chief Minister of Maharashtra Vasantrao Naik. On 10 July 2018, he was elected unopposed with 10 others to the Maharashtra Legislative Council.
