= Dhananjay Munde =

Indian politician

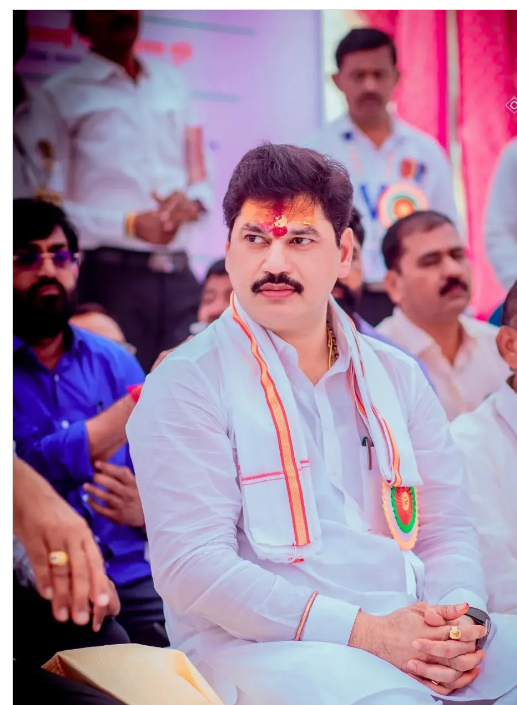

Cabinet Minister Government of Maharashtra
- In office 15 December 2024 – 4 March 2025
- Minister: Food, Civil Supplies & Consumer Protection
- Governor: C. P. Radhakrishnan
- Cabinet: Third Fadnavis ministry
- Chief Minister: Devendra Fadnavis
- Deputy CM: Eknath Shinde; Ajit Pawar
- Guardian Minister: NA
- Preceded by: Chhagan Bhujbal
- Succeeded by: Ajit Pawar

Cabinet Minister Government of Maharashtra
- In office 2 July 2023 – 26 November 2024
- Minister: Agriculture
- Governor: Ramesh Bais; C. P. Radhakrishnan
- Cabinet: Eknath Shinde ministry
- Chief Minister: Eknath Shinde
- Deputy CM: Devendra Fadnavis (First); Ajit Pawar (Second)
- Guardian Minister: Beed District (04 October 2023- 26 November 2024)
- Preceded by: Abdul Sattar Abdul Nabi
- Succeeded by: Manikrao Kokate

Cabinet Minister Government of Maharashtra
- In office 30 December 2019 – 29 June 2022
- Minister: Social Justice; Special Assistance
- Governor: Bhagat Singh Koshyari
- Chief Minister: Uddhav Thackeray
- Deputy CM: Ajit Pawar
- Preceded by: Suresh Khade
- Succeeded by: Eknath Shinde

Guardian Minister of Beed District
- In office 9 January 2020 – 29 June 2022
- Governor: Bhagat Singh Koshyari
- Chief Minister: Uddhav Thackeray
- Preceded by: Pankaja Munde
- Constituency: Parli

Leader of Opposition the Maharashtra Legislative Council
- In office 22 December 2014 – 24 October 2019
- Governor: C. Vidyasagar Rao; Bhagat Singh Koshyari
- Chief Minister: Devendra Fadnavis
- Preceded by: Vinod Tawde
- Succeeded by: Pravin Darekar
- Constituency: Elected by MLAs

Member of the Maharashtra Legislative Assembly
- Incumbent
- Assumed office 21 October 2019
- Preceded by: Pankaja Munde
- Constituency: Parli

Personal details
- Born: 15 July 1975 (age 51) Parli,
- Party: Nationalist Congress Party
- Other political affiliations: Bharatiya Janata Party
- Spouse(s): Karuna Munde, Rajshri Munde
- Relations: Gopinath Munde (Uncle)
- Occupation: Politician
- Website: www.dhananjaymunde.org

Dhananjay Panditrao Munde aka "Dhanu Bhau" (15 July 1975) is an Indian politician. He is currently a member of the Nationalist Congress Party. He was considered a close aide of the Maharashtra Deputy CM Late Sri Ajit Pawar. Before Dhananjay Munde was in Bharatiya Janata Party as President Youth Wing (BJYM) and He was a cabinet minister in Devendra Fadnavis government before 2025.

== Early life ==
Dhananjay Munde was born on 15 July 1975 in Nathra, Parli Vaijnath, Beed in a Vanjari family to parents Panditrao (Anna) Munde and Rukmini Munde. Munde's family consists of his wife Rajashri Munde and daughter Adishri Munde.

He is related to Central Cabinet Minister and former dy.CM of Maharashtra 'Gopinath Rao Munde' whose daughters Pankaja Munde, Pritam Munde and their younger sister Yashashari are his first cousins.

== Political career ==
Munde won the 2019, 2024 assembly elections from Parli constituency. He is the Guardian Minister of Beed District and the Minister of Social Justice and Special Assistance of the State of Maharashtra. On 24 December 2019, as the Minister for Social Justice and Special Assistance. Earlier, he had held the role of opposition leader in the Legislative Council of Maharashtra.

Munde is a candidate who has set history by winning Parli Legislative Assembly elections by a landslide. In 2024 he won the election with around 76% votes from his assembly; with more than 1,40,000 votes than the trailing candidate Rajesaheb Deshmukh.

== Personal life ==
Dhananjay Munde is married to Rajashri Munde.

=== Controversy ===
In January 2021, singer Renu Sharma rape allegations to blackmail Munde, which were subsequently withdrawn. In a press release, Munde claimed that he has been in a relationship with Renu Sharma's sister, Karuna Sharma and even had two children out of that relationship which was known to his wife and family.

In early 2025, Dhananjay Munde faced significant political scrutiny following the arrest of his close associate, Walmik Anna Karad (Beed Mafia Crime Boss), in connection with the murder of Santosh Deshmukh, a sarpanch from Beed district. Deshmukh was allegedly abducted, tortured, and killed in December 2024 for opposing an extortion attempt. The escalating controversy led to widespread demands for Munde's resignation from his ministerial position. On March 4, 2025, Munde resigned from the Maharashtra cabinet, stepping down as the Minister for Food and Civil Supplies.

Anti-corruption activist Anjali Damania demanded immediate resignation of Maharashtra Food and Civil Supplies Minister Dhananjay Munde of the Ajit Pawar-led NCP on in Beed district, claiming that Munde holds “a position of financial gain”. Mahagenco is a company wholly owned by the Maharashtra State Electricity Board (MSEB). “Munde was granted pre-arrest bail last Friday after we argued that he was not absconding and custodial interrogation was not necessary in the case,” his lawyer Aniket Nikam said.

== See also ==
- Sundarrao Solanke
- Gopinath Munde
- Pankaja Munde
- Pritam Munde
