= Shivendra Raje Bhosale =

Indian politician

Minister of Public Works Government of Maharashtra
- Incumbent
- Assumed office 15 December 2024
- Chief Minister: Devendra Fadnavis
- Guardian minister: Latur district
- Preceded by: Ravindra Chavan

Member of the Maharashtra Legislative Assembly
- Incumbent
- Assumed office 2004
- Preceded by: Abhaysinh Raje Bhosale
- Constituency: Satara

Personal details
- Born: Shivendrasinh Raje Bhosale
- Party: Bhartiya Janata Party (2019-present)
- Other political affiliations: Nationalist Congress Party (till 2019)
- Relations: Udayanraje Bhosale (cousin)
- Parents: Abhaysinh Raje Bhosale (father); Arunaraje Bhosale (mother)
- Profession: Politician
- Website: https://babaraje.in

Shivendrasinh Abhaysinhraje Bhosale is an Indian politician and a member of Bharatiya Janata Party. He is a descendant of Chhatrapati Shivaji Maharaj, founder of the Maratha Empire. He is heir to the Satara State royal family.

He was elected to Maharashtra Legislative Assembly from Satara Assembly constituency from 2004 to 2019 as a member of the Nationalist Congress Party. He joined Bharatiya Janata Party ahead of 2019 Maharashtra Legislative Assembly election. He Ssc passed from Annasaheb Kalyani Vidyalaya Satara.

== Personal life ==
He is son of Abhaysinh Raje Bhosale who was also MLA in the Maharashtra Legislative Assembly from Satara Assembly constituency. Udayanraje Bhosale is his cousin.

== Positions held ==
- 2004: Elected to Maharashtra Legislative Assembly (1st term)
- 2009: Re-Elected to Maharashtra Legislative Assembly (2nd term)
- 2014: Re-Elected to Maharashtra Legislative Assembly (3rd term)
- 2019: Re-Elected to Maharashtra Legislative Assembly (4th term)
- 2024: Re-Elected to Maharashtra Legislative Assembly (5th term)
- 15 December 2024. Minister for Public Works
