= Suryabhan Vahadane-Patil =

Indian politician (1930–2008/9)

Member of Parliament, Rajya Sabha
- In office 3 April 1996 – 2 April 2002
- Preceded by: Viren J. Shah
- Succeeded by: Ved Prakash Goyal
- Constituency: Maharashtra

President of Bharatiya Janata Party – Maharashtra
- In office 1994–2000
- Preceded by: N. S. Pharande
- Succeeded by: Pandurang Fundkar

Member of Maharashtra Legislative Council
- In office 28 July 1982 – 27 July 1994
- Constituency: elected by Members of Legislative Assembly

Personal details
- Born: 5 March 1930 (age 96) Puntamba, Kopargaon, Ahmednagar district
- Party: Bharatiya Janata Party
- Spouse: Susheela Vahadane (m. 1951)
- Children: 3 sons, 1 daughter
- Parents: Raghunath Vahadane (father); Sitabai Vahadane (mother)
- Education: Secondary School Certificate
- Profession: Agriculturist, Politician

Suryabhan Vahadane (1930–2008/9) was an Indian politician who is a leader of Bharatiya Janata Party from Maharashtra. He was a member of the Rajya Sabha from 1996 to 2002. Earlier he was a member of the Maharashtra Legislative Council from 1982 to 1994 and served as its Deputy Chairman of Vidhan Parishad from 1988 to 1994. Patil was the president of state unit of the party in 1994. He died in 2008 or 2009.
