= Thakurli =

Village in Maharashtra

- village
- Location within Maharashtra Location within India
- Coordinates: 19.225507°N 73.096730°E
- Country: India
- State: Maharashtra

Languages
  - Official: Marathi
- Time zone: UTC+5:30 (IST)

Thakurli is a neighborhood of Dombivli, Maharashtra, India.

The official language is Marathi. It operates under the Indian Standard Time (UTC+5:30).

It has its own Thakurli railway station on the Central Line of the Mumbai Suburban Railway, with two platforms and full electrification.

Colonial-Era Heritage:

Thakurli was originally established as a British-era railway colony, and remnants like old railway bungalows and the steam-based “Chola Power House” (a power plant for the railway substation) still exist.

The coal-based Thakurli power station was built in 1932 to power suburban rail; it was shut in 1988 after a boiler blast and remained unused for decades.
