= Parli Assembly constituency =

Constituency of the Maharashtra Vidhansabha (legislative assembly) in India

Coordinates: 18°51′21.27″N 76°30′10.30″E

Parli
- Constituency No. 233 for the Maharashtra Legislative Assembly

Constituency details
- Country: India
- Region: Western India
- State: Maharashtra
- District: Beed
- Lok Sabha constituency: Beed
- Established: 2008
- Total electors: 338,441
- Reservation: None

Member of Legislative Assembly
- 15th Maharashtra Legislative Assembly
- Incumbent Dhananjay Munde
- Party: NCP
- Alliance: NDA
- Elected year: 2024

Parli Assembly constituency is a constituency of Maharashtra Vidhan Sabha (legislative assembly) of Maharashtra state in western India. and a segment of Beed Lok Sabha constituency located in Beed district.

== Overview ==
The constituency covers entire Parli (परळी) tehsil and part of Ambajogai tehsil. The number of electors in 2009 were 254,178 (male 133,886, female 120,292). It came into existence in 2008, following the implementation of the delimitation of the legislative assembly constituencies. This constituency covers part of the erstwhile Renapur constituency abolished in 2008.

== Members of the Legislative Assembly ==
Year	Member	Party
Until 2008: Constituency did not exist
2009	Pankaja Munde	Bharatiya Janata Party
2014	Pankaja Munde	Bharatiya Janata Party
2019	Dhananjay Munde	Nationalist Congress Party
2024	Dhananjay Munde	Nationalist Congress Party

== Election results ==
=== Assembly Election 2024 ===
2024 Maharashtra Legislative Assembly election : Parli
Party	Candidate	Votes	%	±%
NCP	Dhananjay Panditrao Munde	194,889	76.24	New
NCP-SP	Rajesaheb Shrikishan Deshmukh	54,665	21.38	New
MMM	Sahas Pandharinath Adode	2,573	1.01	New
NOTA	None of the Above	912	0.36	▲0.11
Margin of victory		140,224	54.85	▲41.13
Turnout		256,550	75.80	▲2.60
Total valid votes		255,638		
Registered electors		338,441		▲10.35
NCP gain from NCP		Swing	▲21.65	

=== Assembly Election 2019 ===
2019 Maharashtra Legislative Assembly election : Parli
Party	Candidate	Votes	%	±%
NCP	Dhananjay Panditrao Munde	122,114	54.59	▲18.03
BJP	Pankaja Gopinathrao Munde	91,413	40.86	▼9.03
VBA	Bhimrao Munja Satpute	4,713	2.11	New
Independent	Raisoddin Jakiyoddin Pathan	1,365	0.61	New
NOTA	None of the Above	561	0.25	▼0.42
Margin of victory		30,701	13.72	▲0.39
Turnout		224,368	73.15	▲2.17
Total valid votes		223,711		
Registered electors		306,710		▲11.76
NCP gain from BJP		Swing	▲4.69	

=== Assembly Election 2014 ===
2014 Maharashtra Legislative Assembly election : Parli
Party	Candidate	Votes	%	±%
BJP	Pankaja Gopinathrao Munde	96,904	49.89	▼7.67
NCP	Dhananjay Panditrao Munde	71,009	36.56	New
INC	Prof. T.P.Munde	14,946	7.70	▼28.29
CPI(M)	Mane Uttam Yashwantrao	3,053	1.57	New
BSP	Gaikwad Anant Vaijnath	1,699	0.87	▼1.32
NOTA	None of the Above	1,304	0.67	New
Margin of victory		25,895	13.33	▼8.24
Turnout		195,544	71.25	▲5.00
Total valid votes		194,230		
Registered electors		274,439		▲7.97
BJP hold		Swing	▼7.67	

=== Assembly Election 2009 ===
2009 Maharashtra Legislative Assembly election : Parli
Party	Candidate	Votes	%	±%
BJP	Pankaja Gopinathrao Munde	96,222	57.56	New
INC	Munde Trimbak Patloba	60,160	35.99	New
BSP	Vahvale Sanjay Santram	3,662	2.19	New
Shivrajya Party	Jadhav Madhav Limbrao	1,915	1.15	New
Independent	Shaikh Lal Shaikh Miskin	1,683	1.01	New
RPI(A)	Nagargoje Ramrao Shesherao	1,144	0.68	New
Margin of victory		36,062	21.57	
Turnout		167,179	65.77	
Total valid votes		167,177		
Registered electors		254,178		
BJP win (new seat)				

== See also ==
- Parli, Maharashtra
- Beed (Lok Sabha constituency)
- Beed District
- List of constituencies of Maharashtra Legislative Assembly
