= Sakharam Narayan Kamat Wagh =

Sakharam Narayan Kamat Wagh was an interpreter for the Portuguese government and the final interpreter from the Wagh family in Portuguese Goa. Because of his fluency in multiple languages, he was known as the State Linguist (Lingvistad) of his lineage.

== Lineage and career ==
Sakharam belonged to the Kamat Wagh family. He was the son of Anant Kamat and the grandson of Bahugun Kamat (also recorded as Bahugun Sadashiv Kamat Wagh), who was the first interpreter from the Kamat Wagh family to serve the Portuguese administration.

Sakharam's career as an interpreter commenced after the death of Bahugun Sadashiv Kamat Wagh in 1807.

== Linguistic abilities ==
Sakharam was fluent in six languages: Marathi, Sanskrit, Portuguese, Latin, French, and English. Because of his language proficiency, he earned the designation of Lingvistad (State Linguist) within the Wagh family. No other interpreter of his time possessed knowledge of as many languages, leading to his recognition as a linguist.
