= Bahugun Sadashiv Kamat Wagh =

Bahugun Sadashiv Kamat Wagh was an official government interpreter during the Portuguese colonial period in Goa. He served the Portuguese administration in this capacity from 1794 to 1807.

== Career ==
In addition to his duties as a translator, Wagh carried out diplomatic and political assignments for the Portuguese government. During his tenure, he established and maintained political relations with the Wadikar Bhonsles and the Soundekars.

== Historical contribution ==
Wagh made a significant contribution to the historical record of Goa by authoring Gomantakachi Barvar, a work dedicated to the history of Goa.
