= Dombivli railway station =

Railway Station in Maharashtra, India

Dombivli
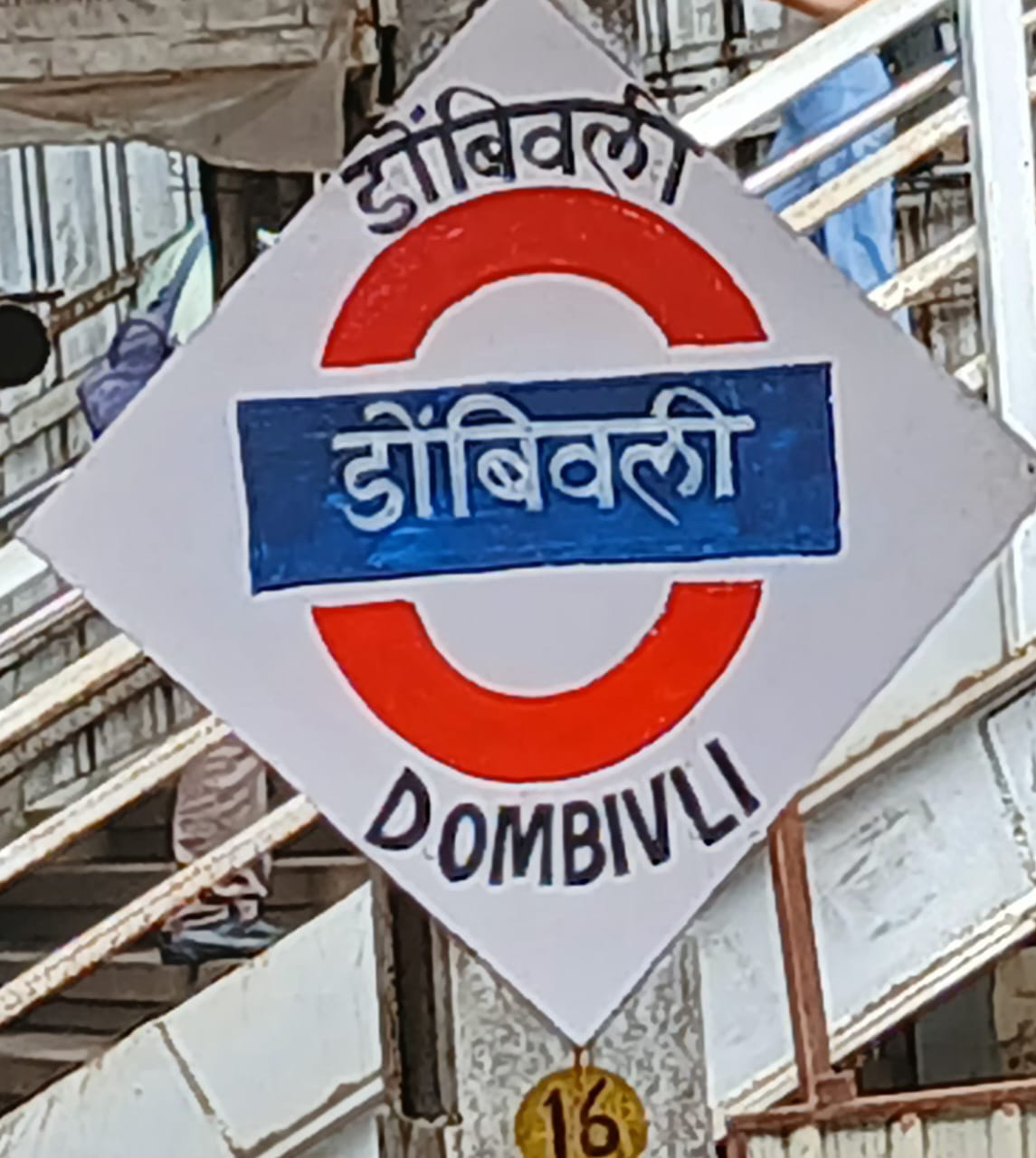
- Dombivli railway station board

General information
- Location: Mahatma Gandhi Rd, Vishnu Nagar, Dombivli West, Dombivli - 421202 / Ramnagar, Dombivli East, Dombivli - 421201 State: Maharashtra
- Coordinates: 19.218433°N 73.086718°E
- System: Indian Railways and Mumbai Suburban Railway station
- Owner: Ministry of Railways, Indian Railways
- Line: Central Line
- Platforms: 5 (1A, 1, 2, 3, 4 and 5)
- Tracks: 7
- Connections: Sharing Rickshaws

Construction
- Structure type: On ground structure
- Parking: Yes
- Cycle facilities: No

Other information
- Status: Active
- Station code: DI
- Fare zone: Central Railway zone

History
- Opened: 1886
- Electrified: 1953

Passengers
- 2012-13: 2,83,362

Services
Preceding station	Mumbai Suburban Railway	Following station
Kopar towards Chhatrapati Shivaji Terminus	Central line	Thakurli towards Kasara or Khopoli
Route map
Location
- Location within India Location within Maharashtra Location within Mumbai

Dombivli railway station (station code: DI), which serves the satellite city of Dombivli, is one of the busiest railway stations on the Central Line of the Mumbai Suburban Railway Network. It consists of five platforms. Both fast and slow local trains halt here, however, no express/long-distance trains halt here.

Platforms 1 and 2 serve slow locals, platform 3 serves slow and as well as semi-fast locals, while platforms 4 and 5, exclusively serve fast locals.

In 2023, Rs.120 crore were sanctioned to beautify the station and some of the works were completed by October 2024.
