= Thakurli railway station =

Railway Station in Maharashtra, India

Thakurli
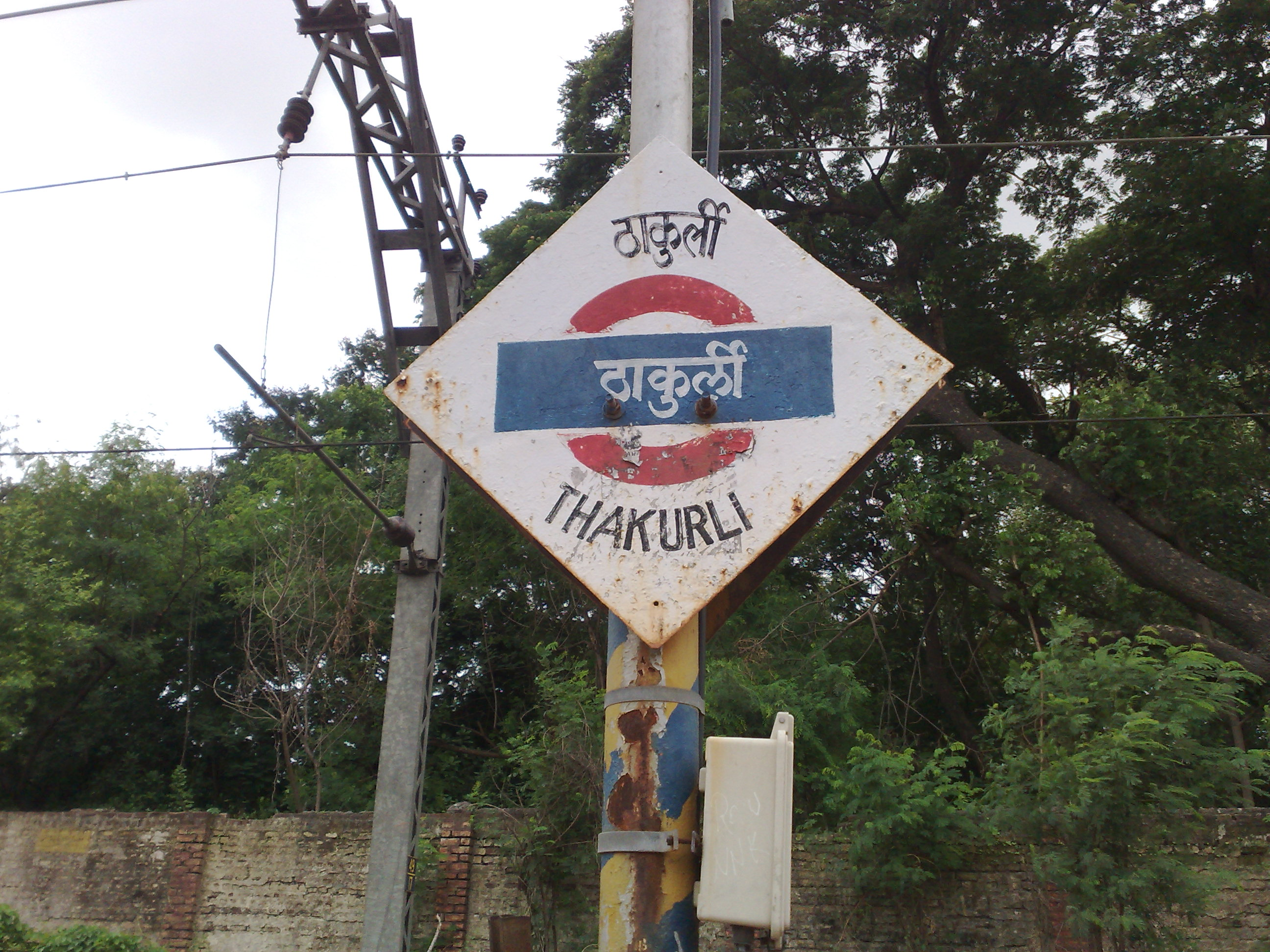

General information
- Location: Thakurli, Kalyan-Dombivali
- Coordinates: 19.225507°N 73.09673°E
- System: Indian Railways and Mumbai Suburban Railway station
- Owner: Ministry of Railways, Indian Railways
- Line: Central Line
- Platforms: 2

Other information
- Status: Active
- Station code: THK
- Fare zone: Central Railways

Services
Preceding station	Mumbai Suburban Railway	Following station
Dombivli towards Chhatrapati Shivaji Terminus	Central line	Kalyan Junction towards Kasara or Khopoli
Route map
Location
- Location within Mumbai

Thakurli (station code: THK) is a railway station on the Central line of the Mumbai Suburban Railway network of the Central Railway. It serves the city of Thakurli. Thakurli is at a distance of 49 km from the Mumbai CST station.

In March 2016, it was announced that India's first elevated train terminus for long-distance trains would come up at Thakurli station at a cost of Rs.1,250 crore.
