= Shridhar Balwant Tilak =

Indian writer (1896–1928)

- Born: 1896
- Died: 25 May 1928 (aged 31–32); Pune, India
- Movement: Non-brahman movement, Samata Sainik Dal
- Children: Shrikant Shridhar Tilak; Jayant Shridhar Tilak
- Parents: Bal Gangadhar Tilak (father); Satyabhamabai Tilak (mother)

Shridhar Balwant Tilak (1896–1928) also known as Shridharpant was a social activist and Marathi writer from Pune. He was the youngest son of Bal Gangadhar Tilak.

== Early life and family ==
Shridhar Balwant Tilak is the third son of Indian independence activist Bal Gangadhar Tilak. Sridhar had two sons; Shrikant, and Jayant Tilak. Jayant was a politician from Indian National Congress and served as a member of the Rajya Sabha, the upper chamber of the Indian Parliament.

== Activism and career ==
=== Fight against casteism ===
Shridhar Tilak campaigned for removal of untouchability in 1920's with national leader Dr. Ambedkar. He was inspired by his philosophy and social reforms and communicated and discuss with him in methods to get rid of upper-cast hegemony. He was also against child marriages and tonsuring of widows. His works were also supported by another social reformer Prabodhankar Thackeray.

On 8 April 1928 in Pune, he established a branch of the multi-cast Samaaj Samata Sang (now known as Samata Sainik Dal) a social organization founded by Dr. Ambedkar. Keshavrao Jedhe who was a friend of Shridar Tilak from Pune was a freedom fighter who was also member of this organization. On 10 May 1928 he organized a community dinner (sahabhojan) at Gaekwad Wada, in Pune, for people from various casts and religions. Dr. Ambedkar himself attended that dinner.

=== Writing ===
Shridhar Tilak published several articles in Marathi magazines like Jnanprakash and Vividhavritta. His collection of articles were published in a book titled Maza Vyasang.

== Death ==
Given his liberal and rational thoughts, Shridhar Tilak was subjected to a lot of harassment by conservatives in Maharashtra region of that period. Unable to tolerate it, he committed suicide on 25 May 1928. Before that he sent three suicide notes: one to the collector of Pune, another to newspapers and a third one to Dr. Ambedkar. Later Dr. Ambedkar wrote – "If anyone who is worthy of the title Lokamanya, it is Shridharpant Tilak."
