= Vitthal Sakharam Page =

Indian politician

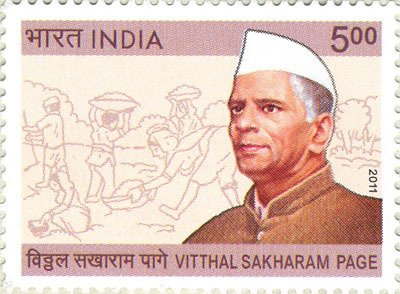

1st Chairmen of the Maharashtra Legislative Council
- In office 21 November 1956 – 10 July 1960

Personal details
- Born: 21 July 1910 Satara district, Maharastra
- Died: 16 March 1990 (aged 79)
- Occupation: Freedom Fighter

Vitthal Sakharam Page was an Indian freedom fighter and politician who served as 1st Chairman of the Maharashtra Legislative Council from 11 July 1960 to 24 April 1978.

== Biography ==
He was born on 21 July 1910 in Satara district and he completed a Bachelor of Laws from Mumbai University.

On 16 March 1990, he died.

== Honors ==
- 2011, The president of India, Pratibha Patil, and India Post released a commemorative stamp on him.
- 2020: MP Sanjaykaka Patil, laid a statement in Indian parliament to honor him with Padma Award posthumously.
