= Dombivli Assembly constituency =

Constituency of the Maharashtra legislative assembly in India

Coordinates: 19.21°N 73.09°E

Dombivli
- Constituency No. 143 for the Maharashtra Legislative Assembly

Constituency details
- Country: India
- Region: Western India
- State: Maharashtra
- District: Thane
- Lok Sabha constituency: Kalyan
- Established: 2008
- Total electors: 313,180
- Reservation: None

Member of Legislative Assembly
- 15th Maharashtra Legislative Assembly
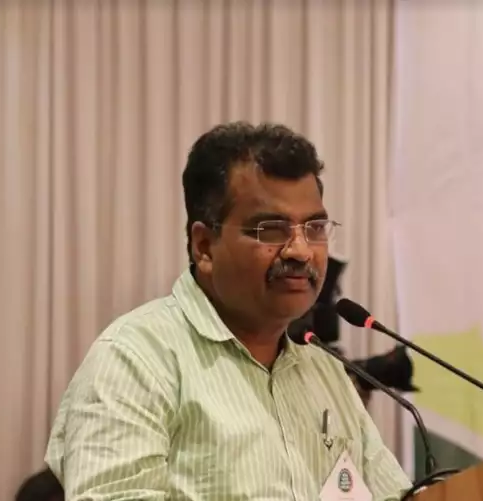
- Incumbent Ravindra Chavan
- Party: BJP
- Alliance: NDA
- Elected year: 2024

Dombivli Assembly constituency is one of the 288 Vidhan Sabha (legislative assembly) constituencies of Maharashtra state, western India. This constituency is located in Thane district.

== Geographical scope ==
The constituency comprises parts of Kalyan taluka that is Ward Nos. 57 to 65, 68 and 78 to 96 of Kalyan-Dombivli Municipal Corporation.

== List of Members of Legislative Assembly ==
| Year | Member | Party |
|---|---|---|
Until 2008: Constituency did not exist
| 2009 | Ravindra Chavan | Bharatiya Janata Party |
| 2014 | Ravindra Chavan | Bharatiya Janata Party |
| 2019 | Ravindra Chavan | Bharatiya Janata Party |
| 2024 | Ravindra Chavan | Bharatiya Janata Party |

== Election results ==
=== Assembly Election 2024 ===
2024 Maharashtra Legislative Assembly election : Dombivli
| Party | Candidate | Votes | % | ±% |
|---|---|---|---|---|
| BJP | Ravindra Dattatray Chavan | 123,815 | 71.24% | ▲10.18 |
| SS(UBT) | Dipesh Pundlik Mhatre | 46,709 | 26.88% | New |
| NOTA | None of the Above | 2,745 | 1.58% | ▼1.35 |
| VBA | Soniya Sanjay Ingole | 1,574 | 0.91% | New |
| Margin of victory | | 77,106 | 44.37% | ▲15.11 |
| Turnout | | 176,534 | 56.37% | ▲15.84 |
| Total valid votes | | 173,789 | | |
| Registered electors | | 313,180 | | ▼12.05 |
| BJP hold | | Swing | ▲10.18 | |

=== Assembly Election 2019 ===
2019 Maharashtra Legislative Assembly election : Dombivli
| Party | Candidate | Votes | % | ±% |
|---|---|---|---|---|
| BJP | Ravindra Dattatray Chavan | 86,227 | 61.07% | ▲4.88 |
| MNS | Mandar Shrikant Halbe | 44,916 | 31.81% | ▲23.79 |
| INC | Radhika Milind Gupte (Ketkar) | 6,613 | 4.68% | ▼0.04 |
| NOTA | None of the Above | 4,134 | 2.93% | ▲1.58 |
| BSP | Damodar Dnyanba Kakde | 2,311 | 1.64% | ▲0.64 |
| Margin of victory | | 41,311 | 29.26% | ▼1.71 |
| Turnout | | 145,351 | 40.82% | ▼4.47 |
| Total valid votes | | 141,198 | | |
| Registered electors | | 356,082 | | ▲5.25 |
| BJP hold | | Swing | ▲4.88 | |

=== Assembly Election 2014 ===
2014 Maharashtra Legislative Assembly election : Dombivli
| Party | Candidate | Votes | % | ±% |
|---|---|---|---|---|
| BJP | Ravindra Dattatray Chavan | 83,872 | 56.19% | ▲8.59 |
| SS | Dipesh Pundlik Mhatre | 37,647 | 25.22% | New |
| MNS | Harishchandra Kacharu Patil | 11,978 | 8.02% | ▼29.97 |
| INC | Kene Santosh Arjun | 7,048 | 4.72% | New |
| NCP | Vikas Gajanan Mhatre | 6,346 | 4.25% | New |
| NOTA | None of the Above | 2,013 | 1.35% | New |
| BSP | Kiratkar Dayanand Tulshiram | 1,495 | 1.00% | ▼0.84 |
| Margin of victory | | 46,225 | 30.97% | ▲21.36 |
| Turnout | | 151,316 | 44.72% | ▲0.52 |
| Total valid votes | | 149,270 | | |
| Registered electors | | 338,330 | | ▲14.91 |
| BJP hold | | Swing | ▲8.59 | |

=== Assembly Election 2009 ===
2009 Maharashtra Legislative Assembly election : Dombivli
| Party | Candidate | Votes | % | ±% |
|---|---|---|---|---|
| BJP | Ravindra Dattatray Chavan | 61,104 | 47.60% | New |
| MNS | Rajesh Shantaram Kadam | 48,777 | 38.00% | New |
| RPI | Shankarlal Motilal Patel | 9,064 | 7.06% | New |
| CPI | Comred Kalu Komaskar | 4,607 | 3.59% | New |
| Independent | Mangala Deepak Sule | 2,450 | 1.91% | New |
| BSP | Kiratkar Dayanand Tulshiram | 2,370 | 1.85% | New |
| Margin of victory | | 12,327 | 9.60% | |
| Turnout | | 128,374 | 43.60% | |
| Total valid votes | | 128,372 | | |
| Registered electors | | 294,420 | | |
| BJP win (new seat) | | | | |
