= Ram Shinde =

7th Chairperson of the Maharashtra Legislative Council since 2024

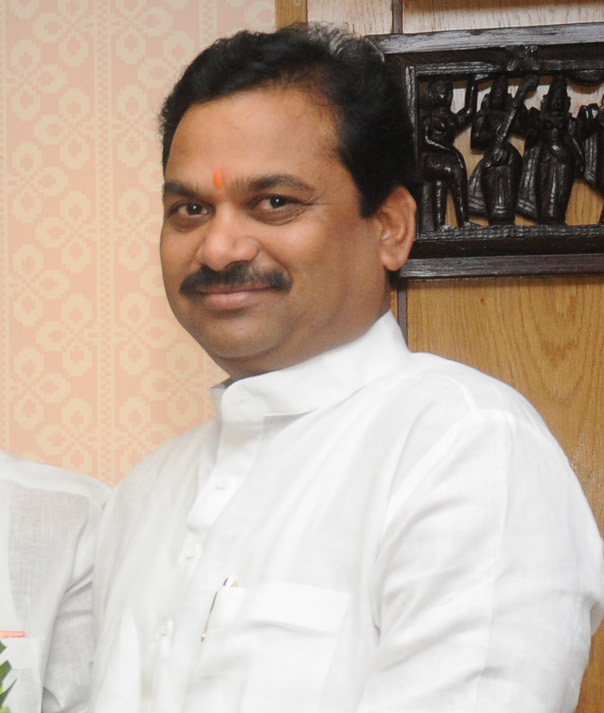
- Shinde in February 2015

7th Chairperson of the Maharashtra Legislative Council
- Incumbent
- Assumed office 15 December 2024
- Governor: C. P. Radhakrishnan; Acharya Devvrat; Jishnu Dev Varma
- Deputy: Neelam Gorhe; Sachin Ahir
- Preceded by: Ramraje Naik Nimbalkar

Minister of Water Conservation of Maharashtra
- In office 8 July 2016 – 8 November 2019
- Chief Minister: Devendra Fadnavis
- Preceded by: Pankaja Munde
- Succeeded by: Shankarrao Gadakh

Minister of State in Maharashtra
- In office 5 December 2014 – 8 July 2016
- Chief Minister: Devendra Fadnavis
- Ministry & Departments: Home Affairs; Marketing; Tourism; Health & Family Welfare

Member of Maharashtra Legislative Council
- Incumbent
- Assumed office 8 July 2022
- Constituency: Elected by the MLAs

Member of Maharashtra Legislative Assembly
- In office 2009–2019
- Preceded by: Sadashiv Lokhande
- Succeeded by: Rohit Pawar
- Constituency: Karjat Jamkhed

Personal details
- Born: Ram Shankarrao Shinde; 1 January 1969 (age 57) Karjat, Maharashtra, India
- Party: Bharatiya Janata Party
- Spouse: Aasha Shinde
- Occupation: Politician

Professor Ram Shankarrao Shinde (born 1 January 1969) is an Indian politician, who is serving as the 7th and current chairperson of the Maharashtra Legislative Council since 19 December 2024. He also serves as a member of the Maharashtra Legislative Council.

== Political career ==
He has previously served as a member of the 13th Maharashtra Legislative Assembly. He represented the Karjat Jamkhed Assembly Constituency. He belongs to the Bharatiya Janata Party. He was appointed Maharashtra's minister of state in December, 2014 and was given responsibility of the home portfolio as well as for public health, agriculture, horticulture, marketing and tourism On 8 July 2016 in cabinet expansion he was promoted to cabinet rank and given charge of the water-conservation ministry.

Political offices
Preceded by Neelam Gorhe (acting)	Chairman of Maharashtra Legislative Council; 15 December 2024- Present
Preceded by	Minister of State for Home (Rural), Health, Agriculture, Horticulture, Marketing and Tourism; Maharashtra State; December 2014–8 July 2016
Preceded by	Cabinet Minister of Water Conservation and Protocol; 8 July 2016 – 2019
Preceded by	Maharashtra State Guardian Minister for Ahmednagar district December 2014–2019
