= Chairperson of the Maharashtra Legislative Council =

Highest authority of the Legislative Council of Maharashtra

Chairperson of Maharashtra Legislative Council
- सभापती, महाराष्ट्र विधानपरिषद
- Seal of the state of Maharashtra

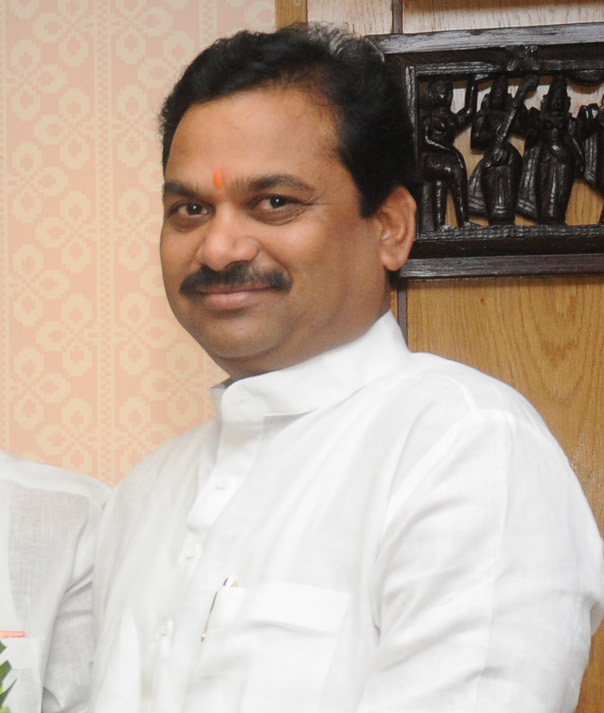
- Incumbent; Ram Shinde since 19 December 2024
- Style: The Honourable (formal); Mr. Chairperson (informal)
- Type: Chairperson
- Status: Highest authority and presiding officer of the Legislative Council
- Member of: Maharashtra Legislative Council
- Reports to: Government of Maharashtra
- Residence: Mumbai
- Seat: Vidhan Bhavan, Mumbai
- Nominator: Members of the Legislative Council
- Term length: No limit
- Constituting instrument: Article 93 of the Constitution of India
- Precursor: Chairperson of The Bombay Legislative Council (1947-60)
- Inaugural holder: Vitthal Sakharam (Bombay); Vitthal Sakharam Page (Maharashtra)
- Formation: 1 May 1960
- Deputy: Deputy Chairperson of the Legislative Council
- Salary: ₹ - approximately

The Chairperson of the Maharashtra Legislative Council presides over the proceedings of the Maharashtra Legislative Council. The chairman is elected internally by the Maharashtra Legislative Council. The deputy chairperson presides in his absence.

== Eligibility ==
The chairman of the Maharashtra Legislative Council:

1. Must be a citizen of India;
2. Must not be less than 25 years of age; and
3. Should not hold any office of profit under the Government of Maharashtra.

== List of Chairpersons ==
The Maharashtra Legislative Council is headed by a chairperson, elected by members in a simple majority vote. The following is the list of chairpersons of the council.

°	Denotes acting chairperson

#	Portrait	Name	Tenure			Party
Pre-Independence Bombay Legislative Council (1937–47)
1		Mangal Das Pakvasa	22 July 1937	16 August 1947	10 years, 25 days	Indian National Congress
Post-Independence Bombay Legislative Council (1947–60)
2		Ramchandra Soman	18 August 1947	5 May 1952	4 years, 261 days	Indian National Congress
3		Ramarao Srinivasrao Hukkerikar	5 May 1952	20 November 1956	4 years, 199 days	Indian National Congress
4		Bhogilal Dhirajlal Lala	21 November 1956	10 July 1960	3 years, 232 days	Indian National Congress
Maharashtra Legislative Council (born 1960)
1		Vitthal Sakharam Page	11 July 1960	24 April 1978	17 years, 287 days	Indian National Congress
°		Ram Meghe	13 June 1978	15 June 1978	2 days	Indian National Congress
2		R. S. Gavai	15 June 1978	22 September 1982	4 years, 99 days	Republican Party of India
3		Jayant Shridhar Tilak	23 September 1982	7 July 1998	15 years, 287 days	Indian National Congress
°		B. T. Deshmukh	20 July 1998	24 July 1998	4 days	Bharatiya Janata Party
4		N. S. Pharande	24 July 1998	7 July 2004	5 years, 349 days	Bharatiya Janata Party
°		Vasant Davkhare	9 July 2004	13 August 2004	35 days	Nationalist Congress Party
5		Shivajirao Deshmukh	13 August 2004	16 March 2015	10 years, 215 days	Indian National Congress
6		Ramraje Naik Nimbalkar	20 March 2015	7 July 2016	7 years, 109 days	Nationalist Congress Party
6		Ramraje Naik Nimbalkar	8 July 2016	7 July 2022	7 years, 109 days	Nationalist Congress Party
°		Neelam Gorhe	7 July 2022	19 December 2024	2 years, 165 days	Shiv Sena
7	The_Minister_of_State_for_Home_(Rural),_Public_Health,_Tourism_and_Marketing_of_Maharashtra,_Prof._Ram_Shinde_meeting_the_Union_Minister_for_Human_Resource_Development,_Smt._Smriti_Irani,_in_New_Delhi_on_February_23,_2015_(cropped)	Ram Shinde	19 December 2024	Incumbent	1 year, 262 days	Bharatiya Janata Party

== List of Deputy Chairpersons ==
№	Portrait	Name	Term of office			Chairmen of the House	Party
1	.	Manikrao Thakre	05 August 2016	19 July 2018	1 year, 348 days	Ramraje Naik Nimbalkar	Indian National Congress
2		Neelam Gorhe	24 June 2019	24 April 2020	305 days	Ramraje Naik Nimbalkar	Shiv Sena
		Neelam Gorhe	08 September 2020	01 July 2026	5 years, 364 days	Ramraje Naik Nimbalkar; Herself (acting); Ram Shinde	Shiv Sena
3		Sachin Ahir	01 July 2026	Incumbent	68 days	Ram Shinde	

== See also ==
- List of governors of Maharashtra
- List of chief ministers of Maharashtra
- List of deputy chief ministers of Maharashtra
- List of speakers of the Maharashtra Legislative Assembly
- List of deputy speakers of the Maharashtra Legislative Assembly
- List of leaders of the house in the Maharashtra Legislative Assembly
- List of leaders of the house in the Maharashtra Legislative Council
- List of deputy leaders of the House in the Maharashtra Legislative Assembly
- List of deputy leaders of the House in the Maharashtra Legislative Council
- List of leaders of the opposition in the Maharashtra Legislative Assembly
- List of leaders of the opposition in the Maharashtra Legislative Council
- List of deputy leaders of the opposition in the Maharashtra Legislative Assembly
- List of deputy leaders of the opposition in the Maharashtra Legislative Council
