= Ramraje Naik Nimbalkar =

Indian politician

Chairman of Maharashtra Legislative Council
- In office 8 July 2016 – 7 July 2022
- Governor: C. Vidyasagar Rao; Bhagat Singh Koshyari
- Chief Minister: Devendra Fadnavis; Uddhav Thackeray
- Deputy Chairman: Neelam Gorhe
- Leader of the House: Chandrakant Patil; Subhash Desai; Ajit Pawar
- Preceded by: Himself
- Succeeded by: Neelam Gorhe Acting
- In office 20 March 2015 – 7 July 2016
- Governor: C. Vidyasagar Rao
- Chief Minister: Devendra Fadnavis
- Deputy Chairman: Manikrao Thakare
- Leader of the House: Eknath Khadse; Chandrakant Patil
- Preceded by: Shivajirao Deshmukh
- Succeeded by: Himself

Member of Legislative Council Maharashtra
- Incumbent
- Assumed office 2010
- Constituency: Elected by MLAs

Cabinet Minister Government of Maharashtra
- In office 11 November 2010 – 7 June 2013
- Governor: K. Sankaranarayanan
- Department & Ministry: Water Resources (Krishna Valley Development); Soil and Water Conservation
- Chief Minister: Prithviraj Chavan
- Preceded by: Ajit Pawar - Water Resources; Balasaheb Thorat - Soil and Water Conservation
- Succeeded by: Shashikant Shinde
- In office 7 November 2009 – 10 November 2010
- Governor: S. C. Jamir; K. Sankaranarayanan
- Department & Ministry: Krishna Valley Irrigation; Corporation
- Chief Minister: Ashok Chavan
- Preceded by: Himself
- Succeeded by: Narayan Rane -Corporation; Himself - Water Resources
- In office 8 December 2008 – 6 November 2009
- Governor: S. C. Jamir
- Department & Ministry: Krishna Valley Irrigation; Corporation; Disaster Management; Relief & Rehabilitation
- Chief Minister: Ashok Chavan
- Preceded by: Himself
- Succeeded by: Narayan Rane -Relief & Rehabilitation; Laxmanrao Dhobale- Disaster Management
- In office 9 November 2004 – 1 December 2008
- Governor: P. C. Alexander; Mohammed Fazal
- Department & Ministry: Krishna Valley; Corporation; Woman and Child Development
- Chief Minister: Vilasrao Deshmukh

Ministers of state Government of Maharashtra
- In office 27 October 1999 – 16 January 2003
- Governor: S. C. Jamir
- Department & Ministry: Revenue; Rehabilitation
- Chief Minister: Vilasrao Deshmukh

Member of Maharashtra Legislative Assembly
- In office 1995–2009
- Preceded by: Suryajirao Kadam
- Succeeded by: Dipak Pralhad Chavan
- Constituency: Phaltan

Personal details
- Born: 8 April 1948 (age 78)
- Party: Nationalist Congress Party
- Occupation: Politician

Ramraje Naik is a senior leader of the Nationalist Congress Party. He was 13th Chairman of the Maharashtra Legislative Council 2015 to 2016 and 2016 to 7 July 2022.

His term in the Council expired on 7 July 2016 and he was re-elected unopposed on 3 June.
