= Jayant Shridhar Tilak =

Indian politician (1921–2001)

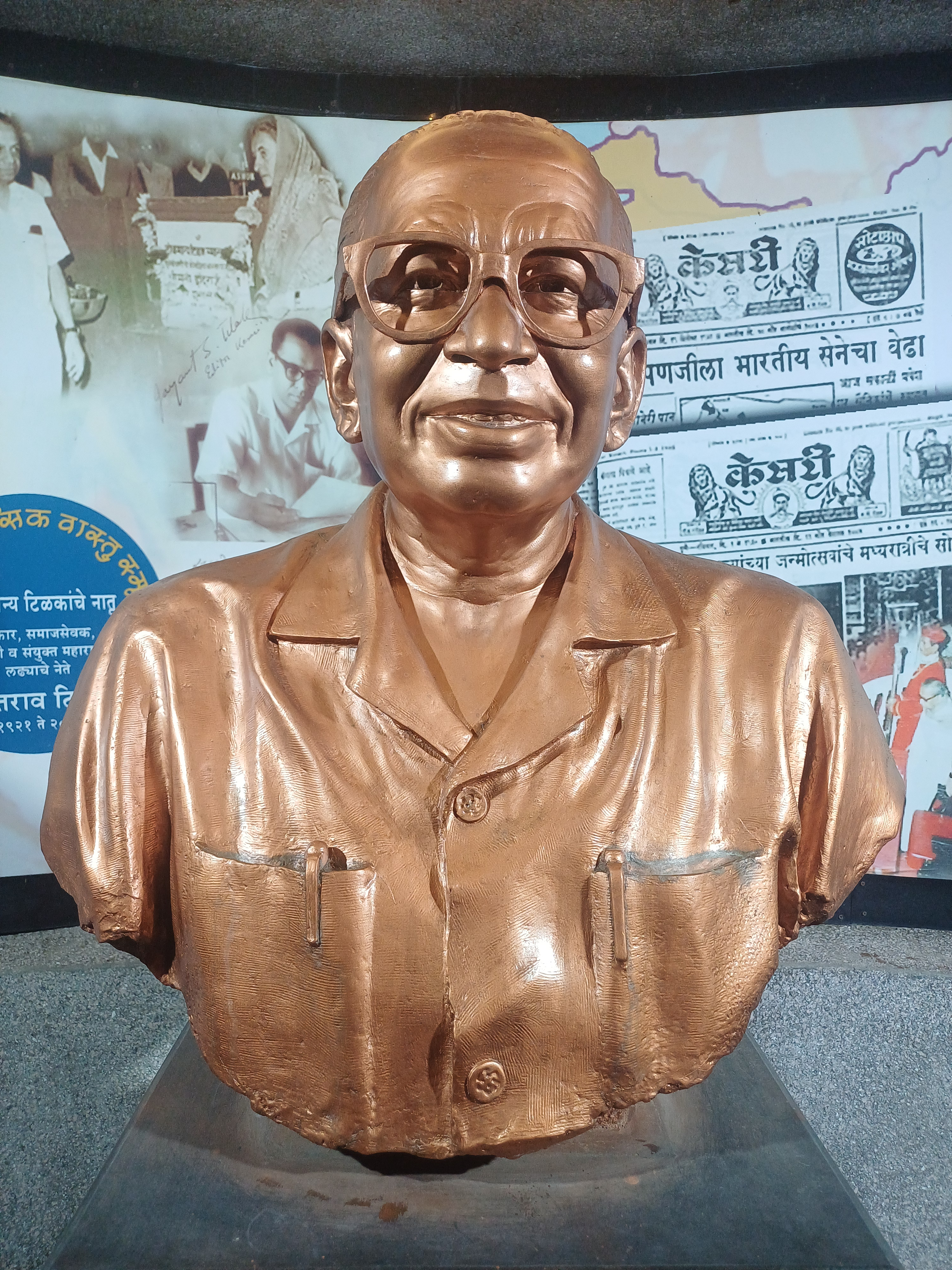
- Bust of Tilak in Pune

Chairman of the Maharashtra Legislative Council
- In office 23 September 1982 – 7 July 1998
- Preceded by: R. S. Gavai
- Succeeded by: Bhaurao Tulshiram Deshmukh

Member of Maharashtra Legislative Council
- In office 23 September 1982 – 7 July 1998

Member of Parliament, Rajya Sabha
- In office 03 April 1974 – 02 April 1980
- In office 03 April 1968 – 02 April 1974
- Constituency: Maharashtra

Personal details
- Born: Jayant Shridhar Tilak; 12 October 1921
- Died: 23 April 2001 (aged 79)
- Party: Indian National Congress
- Parent: Shridhar Balwant Tilak (father)
- Relatives: Bal Gangadhar Tilak (grandfather)
- Occupation: Politician

Jayant Shridhar Tilak (12 October 1921 – 23 April 2001), generally referred to as Jayantrao Tilak, was a politician from Indian National Congress and was a member of the Parliament of India representing Maharashtra in the Rajya Sabha, the upper house of the Indian Parliament. He was also a Member of the Maharashtra Legislative Council. He was the chairman of the house for 16 years.

== Personal life and family ==
Jayant Tilak was a grandson of Lokmanya Tilak, a self-rule activist in the Indian independence movement. Jayant's father, Shridhar Balwant Tilak, was a campaigner for social reforms in India. He worked with B.R. Ambedkar to eradicate untouchability in the 1920s. Dispute with family members and trustees of Kesari led Shridhar to commit suicide in 1928. Jayant Shridhar Tilak died on 23 April 2001.

Jayant Tilak's grandson, Rohit Tilak, is the president of the Tilak Maharashtra University and the general manager of the Kesari Mahratta Trust, which owns and publishes the newspapers Kesari and Mahratta. Rohit was accused of rape in 2017. The case is pending in the court of law. Jayant Tilak's nephew Shailesh is associated with the Bharatiya Janata Party (BJP). Mukta Tilak, Shailesh Tilak's wife and Jayant Tilak's niece-in-law, was the first mayor from BJP in Pune Corporation in 2017. In 2019, Mukta Tilak was elected to Maharashtra assembly as a BJP candidate from Kasba Peth.
