= Shivajirao Deshmukh =

Indian politician (1935–2019)

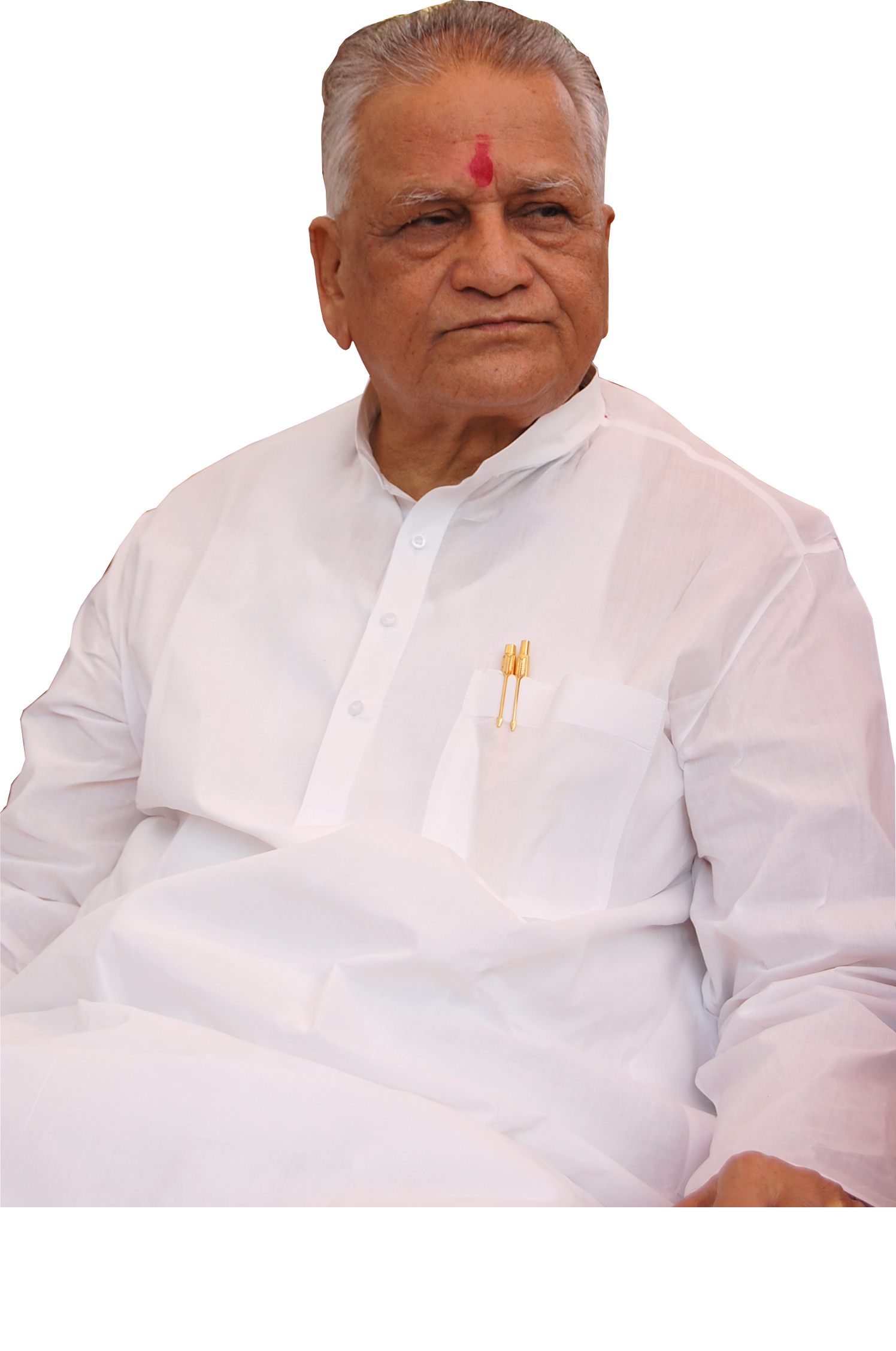

Chairman of Maharashtra Legislative Council
- In office 13 August 2004 – 16 March 2015
- Preceded by: Vasant Davkhare
- Succeeded by: Ramraje Naik Nimbalkar

Member of Maharashtra Legislative Assembly
- In office (1978-1980), (1980-1985), (1985-1990), (1990 – 1995)
- Preceded by: Bhagwanrao Patil
- Succeeded by: Shivajirao Yashwantrao Naik
- Constituency: Shirala

Member of Maharashtra Legislative Council
- In office (1996-2002), (2002-2008), (2008-2014), (2014 – 2019)
- Constituency: Elected by MLAs

Personal details
- Born: 1 September 1935 Sangli
- Died: 14 January 2019 (aged 83)
- Party: Indian National Congress
- Spouse: Sarojini Bandal
- Children: Satyajit Shivajirao Deshmukh, Shilpa Deshmukh
- As of November 16, 2009

Shri Shivajirao Bapusaheb Deshmukh (1 September 1935 – 14 January 2019) was the Chairman of the state of Maharashtra's Legislative Council in India.

He was elected to Maharashtra Legislative Council in 1996, 2002, 2008 and 2014.

He was earlier elected to Maharashtra Assembly in 1978, 1980, 1985 and 1990.

His son Shri Satyajit Shivajirao Deshmukh is an elected Director of Sangli District Central Co-operative Bank and former Vice president of District Council Sangli and MLA Shirala VidhanSabha.
