= Neelam Gorhe =

Indian politician (born 1954)

Dr.Neelam Gorhe
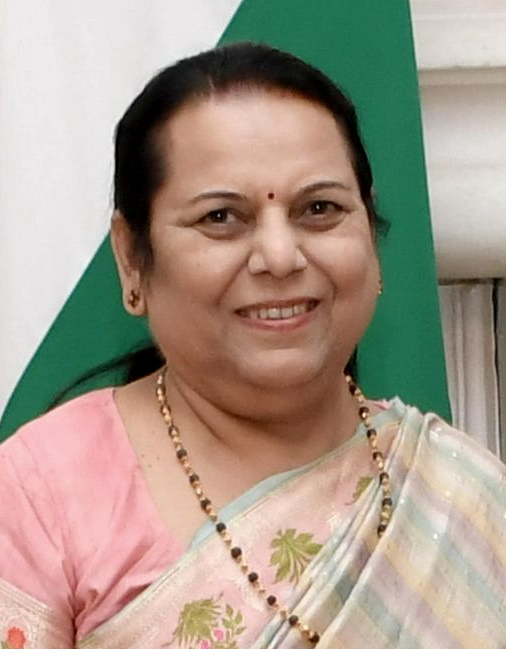
- Official portrait, 2023

Deputy Chairperson of the Maharashtra Legislative Council
- In office 8 September 2020 – 1 July 2026
- Governor: Bhagat Singh Koshyari; Ramesh Bais; C. P. Radhakrishnan; Acharya Devvrat; Jishnu Dev Varma
- Chairperson: Ramraje Naik Nimbalkar; Herself; Ram Shinde
- Preceded by: Herself
- Succeeded by: Sachin Ahir
- In office 24 June 2019 – 24 April 2020
- Governor: C. Vidyasagar Rao; Bhagat Singh Koshyari
- Chairperson: Ramraje Naik Nimbalkar
- Preceded by: Manikrao Thakre
- Succeeded by: Herself

Chairperson of the Maharashtra Legislative Council
- Acting; 7 July 2022 – 19 December 2024
- Governor: Bhagat Singh Koshyari; Ramesh Bais; C. P. Radhakrishnan
- Deputy: Herself
- Preceded by: Ramraje Naik Nimbalkar
- Succeeded by: Ram Shinde

Member of Maharashtra Legislative Council
- Incumbent
- Assumed office 25 April 2002
- Constituency: Elected by the MLAs

Personal details
- Born: 12 September 1954 (age 71) Pandharpur, Bombay State, India
- Party: Shiv Sena
- Occupation: Politician
- Website: neelamgorheshivsena.com

Dr.Neelam Gorhe (born 12 September 1954) is an Indian politician and deputy leader of Shiv Sena from Maharashtra. She was the Deputy Chairperson of Maharashtra Legislative Council. She had been elected to the Legislative Council for four consecutive terms in 2002, 2008, 2014 and 2020. She was acting Chair of Maharashtra Legislative Council from 7 July 2022 to 16 December 2024.

== Early life and career ==
Born on 12 September 1954, Dr. Neelam Diwakar Gorhe holds an Ayurvedic Medical Degree from Mumbai University (1977). After practicing as a medical professional for 10 years (1977-1987) in rural and urban Maharashtra, Neelam Gorhe decided to work across social and political sectors. She also undertook writing on social and women's issues.

== Membership of various Government Committees ==
- Film Censor Board, Maharashtra (Member 1989-91)
- Theater Censor Board of Maharashtra (Member 1993-94)
- Active member of State Women's Policy Drafting Committee, Maharashtra (1994, 1998, and 2001)
- People's Action for Development, India (PADI) (Member 1992-1993)
- Maharashtra State Women's Commission (Member 1993-1995)
- Women's Role and participation in Joint Forest Program, Environment Ministry, Government of India (Member 1994-1995)
- Dowry Eradication Committee, Maharashtra (Legal Support) (Member 1994-1995)
- Women's Forum, Yashwantrao Chavan Center, Mumbai, Maharashtra (Convener -1992-1998)
- Women's Welfare and Rights Committee, Government of Maharashtra (Member)
- Women's Economic Development Corporation, Maharashtra (President, 1998-2000)

Neelam Gorhe actively participates in Print and Electronic Media and shares her views on various issues in the state and the country.

== Positions held ==
- 2002: Elected to Maharashtra Legislative Council (1st term)
- 2008: Re-Elected to Maharashtra Legislative Council (2nd term)
- 2010: Spokesperson of Shiv Sena
- 2011 Onwards: Deputy Leader, Shiv Sena
- 2014: Re-Elected to Maharashtra Legislative Council (3rd term)
- 2015: Special Rights Committee (विशेष हक्क समिती) Pramukh Maharashtra Vidhan Mandal.
- 2019: Elected as Deputy Chairman of Maharashtra Legislative Council
- 2020: Re-Elected to Maharashtra Legislative Council (4th term)
- 2020: Re-Elected as Deputy Chairman of Maharashtra Legislative Council
- 2022-2024: Acting chairman of Maharashtra Legislative Council from 7 July 2022 till 19 December 2024 (Additional Charge)
- 2026: Elected to Maharashtra Legislative Council (5th term)

== Awards ==
- Neelam Gorhe received Newsmakers Achievers Awards in 2021.

== See also ==
- List of members of the Maharashtra Legislative Council
