= List of members of the Bihar Legislative Council =

The Bihar Legislative Council, (officially in Hindi, Bihar Vidhana Parishad) is the upper house of the bicameral legislature of Bihar state in eastern India.

== Chronological list of members of Bihar Legislative Council ==
This is a chronological list of current and past members of the Bihar Legislative Council by the date of appointment. The state elects members for a term of 6 years. 27 members are indirectly elected by the state legislators, 24 members are elected by Local Authorities, 6 from Graduates constituencies and 6 from teachers constituencies. The Governor of Bihar nominates up to 12 eminent people as members from various fields.

- * represents current members
- MLA - elected by Members of Bihar Legislative Assembly
- LA - Local Authorities
- GR - Graduates
- TR - Teachers
- NOM - Nominated

Member	Party	Constituency	Term start	Term end	Term(s)	Notes
Pawan Singh	BJP	MLA	29-Jun-2026	28-Jun-2032	1	
Sanjay Mayukh	BJP	MLA	29-Jun-2026	28-Jun-2032	2	
Anil Thakur	BJP	MLA	29-Jun-2026	28-Jun-2032	1	
Sheela Pandit	BJP	MLA	29-Jun-2026	28-Jun-2032	1	
Nishant Kumar	JDU	MLA	29-Jun-2026	28-Jun-2032	1	
Bharti Mehta	JDU	MLA	29-Jun-2026	28-Jun-2032	1	
Shivrani Devi Prajapati	JDU	MLA	29-Jun-2026	28-Jun-2032	1	
Ashraf Ansari	LJP(RV)	MLA	29-Jun-2026	28-Jun-2032	1	
Sunil Singh	RJD	MLA	29-Jun-2026	28-Jun-2032	2	
Lalan Prasad	JDU	MLA	11-Jun-2026	06-May-2030	1	bye - resignation of Nitish Kumar
Surya Kumar Sharma	BJP	MLA	04-May-2026	06-May-2030	1	bye - resignation of Mangal Pandey
Shri Bhagwan Singh Kushwaha	JDU	MLA	05-Jul-2024	16-Nov-2025	1	elected to Jagdishpur Assembly bye - disqualification of Rambali Chandravanshi
Mangal Pandey	BJP	MLA	07-May-2024	16-Nov-2025	3	elected to Siwan Assembly
Anamika Singh Patel	BJP	MLA	07-May-2024	06-May-2030	1	
Lal Mohan Gupta	BJP	MLA	07-May-2024	06-May-2030	1	
Nitish Kumar	JDU	MLA	07-May-2024	30-Mar-2026	4	elected to Rajya Sabha
Khalid Anwar	JDU	MLA	07-May-2024	06-May-2030	2	
Santosh Suman	HAM	MLA	07-May-2024	06-May-2030	2	
Rabri Devi	RJD	MLA	07-May-2024	06-May-2030	3	
Abdul Bari Siddiqui	RJD	MLA	07-May-2024	06-May-2030		
Syed Faisal Ali	RJD	MLA	07-May-2024	06-May-2030		
Urmila Thakur	RJD	MLA	07-May-2024	06-May-2030	1	
Shashi Yadav	CPI-ML	MLA	07-May-2024	06-May-2030	1	
Raj Vardhan Azad	JDU	NOM	13-Oct-2023	16-Mar-2027	1	bye - resignation of Upendra Kushwaha
Virendra Narayan Yadav	JDU	Saran GR	09-May-2023	08-May-2029		
Awadhesh Narain Singh	BJP	Gaya GR	09-May-2023	08-May-2029		
Sanjeev Kumar Singh	JDU	Koshi TR	09-May-2023	08-May-2029		
Jeevan Kumar	BJP	Gaya TR	09-May-2023	08-May-2029		
Afaque Ahmad	Ind	Saran TR	06-Apr-2023	16-Nov-2026		bye- death of Kedar Nath Pandey
Munni Rajak	RJD	MLA	22-Jul-2022	21-Jul-2028		
Ashok Kumar Pandey	RJD	MLA	22-Jul-2022	21-Jul-2028		
Qari Sohaib	RJD	MLA	22-Jul-2022	21-Jul-2028		
Anil Sharma	BJP	MLA	22-Jul-2022	21-Jul-2028		
Hari Sahni	BJP	MLA	22-Jul-2022	21-Jul-2028		
Rabindra Prasad Singh	JDU	MLA	22-Jul-2022	21-Jul-2028		
Afaque Ahmad Khan	JDU	MLA	22-Jul-2022	21-Jul-2028		
Kartikey Singh	RJD	Patna LA	08-Apr-2022	07-Apr-2028		
Radha Charan Sah	JDU	Bhojpur-Buxar LA	08-Apr-2022	07-Apr-2028		
Rinku Yadav	RJD	Gaya-Jehanabad-Arwal LA	08-Apr-2022	07-Apr-2028		
Reena Yadav	JDU	Nalanda LA	08-Apr-2022	07-Apr-2028		
Santosh Singh	BJP	Rohtas-Kaimur LA	08-Apr-2022	07-Apr-2028		
Ashok Yadav	Ind	Nawada LA	08-Apr-2022	07-Apr-2028		
Dilip Singh	BJP	Aurangabad LA	08-Apr-2022	07-Apr-2028		
Sachchidanand Rai	Ind	Saran LA	08-Apr-2022	07-Apr-2028		
Vinod Jaiswal	RJD	Siwan LA	08-Apr-2022	07-Apr-2028		
Sunil Chaudhary	BJP	Darbhanga LA	08-Apr-2022	07-Apr-2028		
Maheshwar Singh	Ind	East Champaran LA	08-Apr-2022	07-Apr-2028		
Dinesh Prasad Singh	JDU	Muzaffarpur LA	08-Apr-2022	07-Apr-2028		
Bhushan Ray	RLJP	Vaishali LA	08-Apr-2022	07-Apr-2028		
Tarun Kumar	BJP	Samastipur LA	08-Apr-2022	07-Apr-2028		
Saurabh Kumar	RJD	West Champaran LA	08-Apr-2022	07-Apr-2028		
Rekha Devi	JDU	Sitamarhi-Sheohar LA	08-Apr-2022	07-Apr-2028		
Dilip Jaiswal	BJP	Purnia-Araria-Kishanganj LA	08-Apr-2022	07-Apr-2028		
Vijay Singh	JDU	Bhagalpur-Banka LA	08-Apr-2022	07-Apr-2028		
Ajay Kumar Singh	RJD	Munger-Jamui-Lakhisarai- Sheikhpura LA	08-Apr-2022	07-Apr-2028		
Ashok Agrawal	BJP	Katihar LA	08-Apr-2022	07-Apr-2028		
Ajay Singh	RJD	Saharsa-Madhepura-Supaul LA	08-Apr-2022	07-Apr-2028		
Ambika Gulab Yadav	Ind	Madhubani LA	08-Apr-2022	07-Apr-2028		
Rajeev Singh	BJP	Gopalganj LA	08-Apr-2022	07-Apr-2028		
Rajeev Kumar	INC	Begusarai-Khagaria LA	08-Apr-2022	07-Apr-2028		
Rozina Nazish	JDU	MLA	27-Sep-2021	21-Jul-2022		bye - death of Tanveer Akhtar
Janak Ram	BJP	NOM	17-Mar-2021	16-Mar-2027		
Devesh Kumar	BJP	NOM	17-Mar-2021	16-Mar-2027		
Rajendra Prasad Gupta	BJP	NOM	17-Mar-2021	16-Mar-2027		
Pramod Kumar Chandravanshi	BJP	NOM	17-Mar-2021	16-Mar-2027		
Ghanshyam Thakur	BJP	NOM	17-Mar-2021	16-Mar-2027		
Nivedita Singh	BJP	NOM	17-Mar-2021	16-Mar-2027		
Upendra Kushwaha	JDU	NOM	17-Mar-2021	24-Feb-2023		resigned
Ashok Choudhary	JDU	NOM	17-Mar-2021	16-Mar-2027		
Ram Bachan Rai	JDU	NOM	17-Mar-2021	16-Mar-2027		
Sanjay Kumar Singh	JDU	NOM	17-Mar-2021	16-Mar-2027		
Lallan Kumar Saraf	JDU	NOM	17-Mar-2021	16-Mar-2027		
Sanjay Singh	JDU	NOM	17-Mar-2021	16-Mar-2027		
Shahnawaz Hussain	BJP	MLA	21-Jan-2021	06-May-2024		bye - res of Sushil Modi
Mukesh Sahani	VIP	MLA	21-Jan-2021	21-Jul-2022		bye - res of Vinod Narayan Jha
Devesh Chandra Thakur	JDU	Tirhut GR	17-Nov-2020	14-Jun-2024		elected to Sitamarhi Lok Sabha
Neeraj Kumar	JDU	Patna GR	17-Nov-2020	16-Nov-2026		
Narendra Kumar Yadav	BJP	Koshi GR	17-Nov-2020	16-Nov-2026		
Sarvesh Kumar	Ind	Darbhanga GR	17-Nov-2020	16-Nov-2026		
Nawal Kishore Yadav	BJP	Patna TR	17-Nov-2020	16-Nov-2026		
Madan Mohan Jha	INC	Darbhanga TR	17-Nov-2020	16-Nov-2026		
Kedar Nath Pandey	CPI	Saran TR	17-Nov-2020	24-Oct-2022		expired on 24-Oct-2022
Sanjay Kumar Singh	CPI	Tirhut TR	17-Nov-2020	16-Nov-2026		
Ghulam Ghaus	JDU	MLA	29-Jun-2020	28-Jun-2026		
Bhishm Sahni	JDU	MLA	29-Jun-2020	28-Jun-2026		
Kumud Verma	JDU	MLA	29-Jun-2020	28-Jun-2026		
Rambali Singh Chandravanshi	RJD	MLA	29-Jun-2020	28-Jun-2026		
Sunil Singh	RJD	MLA	29-Jun-2020	28-Jun-2026		
Farooq Shaikh	RJD	MLA	29-Jun-2020	28-Jun-2026		
Samrat Chaudhary	BJP	MLA	29-Jun-2020	16-Nov-2025	1	elected to Tarapur Assembly
Sanjay Mayukh	BJP	MLA	29-Jun-2020	28-Jun-2026		
Samir Kumar Singh	INC	MLA	29-Jun-2020	28-Jun-2026		
Qamar Alam	JDU	MLA	23-Jun-2020	21-Jul-2022		defected from RJD
Ranvijay Kumar Singh	JDU	MLA	23-Jun-2020	21-Jul-2022		defected from RJD
Radhacharan Sah	JDU	Bhojpur-Buxar LA	23-Jun-2020	16-Jul-2021		defected from RJD
Dilip Rai	JDU	Sitamarhi-Sheohar LA	23-Jun-2020	16-Jul-2021		defected from RJD
Sanjay Prasad	JDU	Munger-Jamui-Lakhisarai- Sheikhpura LA	23-Jun-2020	16-Jul-2021		defected from RJD
Sanjay Jha	JDU	MLA	31-May-2019	06-May-2024		bye - death of Khurshid Mohsin
Radha Mohan Sharma	BJP	MLA	31-May-2019	06-May-2020		bye- death of Suraj Nandan Kushwaha
Sanjeev Shyam Singh	JDU	Gaya TR	26-May-2019	08-May-2023		defected from RLSP on 26-May-2019
Nitish Kumar	JDU	MLA	07-May-2018	06-May-2024		
Rameshwar Mahto	JDU	MLA	07-May-2018	06-May-2024		
Khalid Anwar	JDU	MLA	07-May-2018	06-May-2024	1	
Sushil Modi	BJP	MLA	07-May-2018	09-Dec-2020		elected to Rajya Sabha
Mangal Pandey	BJP	MLA	07-May-2018	06-May-2024		
Sanjay Paswan	BJP	MLA	07-May-2018	06-May-2024		
Rabri Devi	RJD	MLA	07-May-2018	06-May-2024	2	
Ram Chandra Purve	RJD	MLA	07-May-2018	06-May-2024		
Khurshid Mohsin	RJD	MLA	07-May-2018	12-Jan-2019		expired on 12-Jan-2019
Prem Chandra Mishra	INC	MLA	07-May-2018	06-May-2024		
Santosh Kumar Suman	HAM	MLA	07-May-2018	06-May-2024		
Tanveer Akhtar	JDU	MLA	28-Feb-2018	08-May-2021		defected from INC on 28-Feb-2018 expired on 8-May-2021
Ashok Choudhary	JDU	MLA	28-Feb-2018	06-May-2020		defected from INC on 28-Feb-2018
Virendra Narayan Yadav	JDU	Saran GR	09-May-2017	08-May-2023		
Awadhesh Narain Singh	BJP	Gaya GR	09-May-2017	08-May-2023		
Sanjeev Kumar Singh	JDU	Koshi TR	09-May-2017	08-May-2023		
Sanjeev Shyam Singh	RLSP	Gaya TR	09-May-2017	26-May-2019		defected to JDU on 26-May-2019
Qamar Alam	RJD	MLA	22-Jul-2016	23-Jun-2020		defected to JDU on 23-Jun-2020
Ranvijay Kumar Singh	RJD	MLA	22-Jul-2016	23-Jun-2020		defected to JDU on 23-Jun-2020
C. P. Sinha	JDU	MLA	22-Jul-2016	21-Jul-2022		
Gulam Rasool Balyawi	JDU	MLA	22-Jul-2016	21-Jul-2022		
Vinod Narayan Jha	BJP	MLA	22-Jul-2016	11-Nov-2020		elected to Benipatti on 11-Nov-2020
Arjun Sahani	BJP	MLA	22-Jul-2016	21-Jul-2022		
Tanveer Akhtar	INC	MLA	22-Jul-2016	28-Feb-2018		defected to JDU on 28-Feb-2018
Chandeshwar Prasad	JDU	MLA	04-Feb-2016	06-May-2018		bye - res of Bhim Singh
Rajesh Ram	INC	West Champaran LA	17-Jul-2015	16-Jul-2021		
Rajesh Gupta	BJP	East Champaran LA	17-Jul-2015	16-Jul-2021		
Dilip Rai	RJD	Sitamarhi-Sheohar LA	17-Jul-2015	23-Jun-2020		joined JDU on 23-Jun-2020
Suman Kumar Mahaseth	BJP	Madhubani LA	17-Jul-2015	16-Jul-2021		
Dilip Jaiswal	BJP	Purnia-Araria-Kishanganj LA	17-Jul-2015	16-Jul-2021		
Ashok Agrawal	Ind	Katihar LA	17-Jul-2015	16-Jul-2021		
Nutan Singh	LJP	Saharsa-Madhepura-Supaul LA	17-Jul-2015	16-Jul-2021		
Sunil Kumar Singh	BJP	Darbhanga LA	17-Jul-2015	21-Jul-2020		expired on 22-Jul-2020
Dinesh Prasad Singh	JDU	Muzaffarpur LA	17-Jul-2015	16-Jul-2021		
Aditya Narayan Pandey	BJP	Gopalganj LA	17-Jul-2015	16-Jul-2021		
Tunna Pandey	BJP	Siwan LA	17-Jul-2015	16-Jul-2021		
Sachchidanand Rai	BJP	Saran LA	17-Jul-2015	16-Jul-2021		
Subodh Kumar	RJD	Vaishali LA	17-Jul-2015	16-Jul-2021		
Hari Narayan Chaudhary	BJP	Samastipur LA	17-Jul-2015	30-Apr-2021		expired on 30-Apr-2021
Rajnish Kumar Singh	BJP	Begusarai-Khagaria LA	17-Jul-2015	16-Jul-2021		
Manoj Yadav	JDU	Bhagalpur-Banka LA	17-Jul-2015	11-Nov-2020		elected to Belhar on 11-Nov-2020
Sanjay Prasad	RJD	Munger-Jamui-Lakhisarai- Sheikhpura LA	17-Jul-2015	23-Jun-2020		joined JDU on 23-Jun-2020
Reena Yadav	JDU	Nalanda LA	17-Jul-2015	16-Jul-2021		
Ritlal Yadav	Ind	Patna LA	17-Jul-2015	11-Nov-2020		elected to Danapur on 11-Nov-2020
Radhacharan Sah	RJD	Bhojpur-Buxar LA	17-Jul-2015	23-Jun-2020		joined JDU on 23-Jun-2020
Santosh Singh	BJP	Rohtas-Kaimur LA	17-Jul-2015	16-Jul-2021		
Rajan Singh	BJP	Aurangabad LA	17-Jul-2015	16-Jul-2021		
Manorama Devi	JDU	Gaya-Jehanabad-Arwal LA	17-Jul-2015	16-Jul-2021		
Salman Raghib	JDU	Nawada LA	17-Jul-2015	16-Jul-2021		
Ram Lakhan Ram Raman	JDU	NOM	24-May-2014	23-May-2020		
Samrat Chaudhary	JDU	NOM	24-May-2014	06-Jan-2016		disqualified
Javed Iqbal Ansari	JDU	NOM	24-May-2014	23-May-2020		
Vijay Kumar Mishra	JDU	NOM	24-May-2014	23-May-2020		
Rana Gangeshwar Singh	JDU	NOM	24-May-2014	23-May-2020		
Lalan Singh	JDU	NOM	24-May-2014	23-May-2019		elected to Munger on 23-May-2019
Sanjay Kumar Singh	JDU	NOM	24-May-2014	23-May-2020		
Ramvachan Rai	JDU	NOM	24-May-2014	23-May-2020		
Lallan Kumar Saraf	JDU	NOM	24-May-2014	23-May-2020		
Ranbir Nandan Prasad	JDU	NOM	24-May-2014	23-May-2020		
Ramchandra Bharti	JDU	NOM	24-May-2014	23-May-2020		
Shiv Prasann Yadav	JDU	NOM	24-May-2014	23-May-2020		
Prashant Kumar Shahi	JDU	MLA	07-May-2014	06-May-2020		
Satish Kumar	JDU	MLA	07-May-2014	06-May-2020		
Haroon Rashid	JDU	MLA	07-May-2014	06-May-2020		
Hira Prasad Bind	JDU	MLA	07-May-2014	06-May-2020		
Sonelal Mehta	JDU	MLA	07-May-2014	06-May-2020		
Krishan Kumar Singh	BJP	MLA	07-May-2014	06-May-2020		
Sanjay Mayukh	BJP	MLA	07-May-2014	06-May-2020		
Suraj Nandan Kushwaha	BJP	MLA	07-May-2014	28-Dec-2018		expired on 28-Dec-2018
Dilip Kumar Choudhary	INC	Darbhanga GR	07-May-2014	06-May-2020		
Neeraj Kumar	JDU	Patna GR	07-May-2014	06-May-2020		
Devesh Chandra Thakur	Ind	Tirhut GR	07-May-2014	06-May-2020		
Narendra Kumar Yadav	BJP	Koshi GR	07-May-2014	06-May-2020		
Kedar Nath Pandey	CPI	Saran TR	07-May-2014	06-May-2020		
Nawal Kishore Yadav	BJP	Patna TR	07-May-2014	06-May-2020		
Sanjay Kumar Singh	CPI	Tirhut TR	07-May-2014	06-May-2020		
Madan Mohan Jha	INC	Darbhanga TR	07-May-2014	06-May-2020		
Ashok Choudhary	INC	MLA	07-May-2014	28-Feb-2018		defected to JDU on 28-Feb-2018
Raj Kishore Kushwaha	JDU	MLA	02-May-2013	06-May-2018		bye- death of Ramashray Prasad Singh
Manzar Alam	JDU	MLA	02-May-2013	21-Jul-2016		bye - death of Ramchandra Prasad
Vivek Thakur	BJP	MLA	02-May-2013	06-May-2014		bye - death of Badshah Prasad Azad
Nitish Kumar	JDU	MLA	07-May-2012	06-May-2018		
Upendra Prasad	JDU	MLA	07-May-2012	06-May-2018		
Narendra Singh	JDU	MLA	07-May-2012	06-Jan-2016		disqualified
Bhim Singh	JDU	MLA	07-May-2012	23-Oct-2015		resigned on 23-Oct-2015
Ramashray Prasad Singh	JDU	MLA	07-May-2012	19-Jan-2013		expired on 19-Jan-2013
Sanjay Singh	JDU	MLA	07-May-2012	06-May-2018		
Sushil Modi	BJP	MLA	07-May-2012	06-May-2018		
Mangal Pandey	BJP	MLA	07-May-2012	06-May-2018		
Lal Babu Prasad	BJP	MLA	07-May-2012	06-May-2018		
Satyendra Narayan Kushwaha	BJP	MLA	07-May-2012	10-Jan-2018		expired on 10-Jan-2018
Rabri Devi	RJD	MLA	07-May-2012	06-May-2018	1	
Mahachandra Prasad Singh	JDU	Saran GR	09-May-2011	02-Dec-2015		disqualified on 02-Dec-2015
Awadhesh Narain Singh	BJP	Gaya GR	09-May-2011	08-May-2017		
Sanjeev Kumar Singh	JDU	Koshi TR	09-May-2011	08-May-2017		
Sanjeev Shyam Singh	Ind	Gaya TR	09-May-2011	08-May-2017		
Prashant Kumar Shahi	JDU	MLA	10-Mar-2011	06-May-2014		bye - res of Ramdhani Singh
Udaykant Choudhary	JDU	MLA	22-Jul-2010	21-Jul-2016		
Rudal Rai	JDU	MLA	22-Jul-2010	21-Jul-2016		
Vijay Kumar Verma	JDU	MLA	22-Jul-2010	21-Jul-2016		
Harendra Pratap Pandey	BJP	MLA	22-Jul-2010	21-Jul-2016		
Kiran Ghai Sinha	BJP	MLA	22-Jul-2010	21-Jul-2016		
Ghulam Ghaus	RJD	MLA	22-Jul-2010	21-Jul-2016		
Ramchandra Prasad	RJD	MLA	22-Jul-2010	30-Jan-2013		expired on 30-Jan-2013
Bhim Singh	JDU	MLA	05-Aug-2009	06-May-2012		defected from RJD
Upendra Prasad	JDU	MLA	05-Aug-2009	06-May-2012		bye - res of Nagmani
Bhumipal Rai	JDU	MLA	05-Aug-2009	21-Jul-2010		bye - res of Ram Badan Rai
Rajesh Ram	JDU	West Champaran LA	17-Jul-2009	16-Jul-2015		
Renu Singh	Ind	East Champaran LA	17-Jul-2009	16-Jul-2015		
Baidyanath Prasad	BJP	Sitamarhi-Sheohar LA	17-Jul-2009	16-Jul-2015		
Binod Kumar Singh	JDU	Madhubani LA	17-Jul-2009	16-Jul-2015		
Dilip Jaiswal	BJP	Purnia-Araria-Kishanganj LA	17-Jul-2009	16-Jul-2015		
Ashok Agrawal	BJP	Katihar LA	17-Jul-2009	16-Jul-2015		
Md. Israil Rain	JDU	Saharsa-Madhepura-Supaul LA	17-Jul-2009	16-Jul-2015		
Mishri Lal Yadav	RJD	Darbhanga LA	17-Jul-2009	16-Jul-2015		
Dinesh Prasad Singh		Muzaffarpur LA	17-Jul-2009	16-Jul-2015		
Sunil Kumar Singh	JDU	Gopalganj LA	17-Jul-2009	16-Jul-2015		
Manoj Kumar Singh	Ind	Siwan LA	17-Jul-2009	16-Jul-2015		
Saleem Perwez	JDU	Saran LA	17-Jul-2009	16-Jul-2015		
Rajendra Rai		Vaishali LA	17-Jul-2009	16-Jul-2015		
Roma Bharti	RJD	Samastipur LA	17-Jul-2009	16-Jul-2015		
Rajnish Kumar Singh	BJP	Begusarai-Khagaria LA	17-Jul-2009	16-Jul-2015		
Manoj Yadav		Bhagalpur-Banka LA	17-Jul-2009	16-Jul-2015		
Sanjay Prasad		Munger-Jamui-Lakhisarai- Sheikhpura LA	17-Jul-2009	16-Jul-2015		
Raju Yadav	LJP	Nalanda LA	17-Jul-2009	16-Jul-2015		
Balmiki Singh	Ind	Patna LA	17-Jul-2009	16-Jul-2015		
Hulas Pandey	Ind	Bhojpur-Buxar LA	17-Jul-2009	16-Jul-2015		
Krishna Kumar Singh		Rohtas-Kaimur LA	17-Jul-2009	16-Jul-2015		
Ranjan Kumar Singh		Aurangabad LA	17-Jul-2009	16-Jul-2015		
Anuj Kumar Singh	BJP	Gaya-Jehanabad-Arwal LA	17-Jul-2009	16-Jul-2015		
Salman Raghib		Nawada LA	17-Jul-2009	16-Jul-2015		
Sanjay Singh	JDU	MLA	05-Jun-2009	06-May-2012		defected from LJP
Ramdhani Singh	JDU	MLA	07-May-2008	01-Oct-2010		resigned
Haroon Rashid	JDU	MLA	07-May-2008	06-May-2014		
Satish Kumar	JDU	MLA	07-May-2008	06-May-2014		
Hira Prasad Bind	JDU	MLA	07-May-2008	06-May-2014		
Giriraj Singh	BJP	MLA	07-May-2008	06-May-2014		
Kameshwar Choupal	BJP	MLA	07-May-2008	06-May-2014		
Tanweer Hassan	RJD	MLA	07-May-2008	06-May-2014		
Badshah Prasad Azad	RJD	MLA	07-May-2008	20-Jan-2013		expired
Jyoti Devi	INC	MLA	07-May-2008	06-May-2014		
Vinod Choudhary	JDU	Darbhanga GR	07-May-2008	06-May-2014		
Neeraj Kumar	JDU	Patna GR	07-May-2008	06-May-2014		
Devesh Chandra Thakur	JDU	Tirhut GR	07-May-2008	06-May-2014		
Virkeshwar Prasad Singh	BJP	Koshi GR	07-May-2008	06-May-2014		
Kedar Nath Pandey	CPI	Saran TR	07-May-2008	06-May-2014		
Nawal Kishore Yadav	RJD	Patna TR	07-May-2008	06-May-2014		
Narendra Prasad Singh	BJP	Tirhut TR	07-May-2008	06-May-2014		
Basudev Singh	CPM	Darbhanga TR	07-May-2008	06-May-2014		
Prem Kumar Mani	JDU	NOM	11-May-2006	12-Sep-2011		disqualified
Shambhu Sharan Shrivastava	JDU	NOM	11-May-2006	11-Aug-2011		resigned
Sanjay Kumar Singh	JDU	NOM	11-May-2006	10-May-2012		
Shiv Prasann Yadav	JDU	NOM	11-May-2006	10-May-2012		
Aslam Azad	JDU	NOM	11-May-2006	10-May-2012		
Ganesh Bharti	JDU	NOM	11-May-2006	10-May-2012		
Brahmadev Narayan Singh	JDU	NOM	11-May-2006	10-May-2012		
Sanjay Kumar Jha	BJP	NOM	11-May-2006	10-May-2012		
Rajvanshi Singh	BJP	NOM	11-May-2006	10-May-2012		
Ramkishore Singh	BJP	NOM	11-May-2006	10-May-2012		
Rajendra Prasad Gupta	BJP	NOM	11-May-2006	10-May-2012		
Ganga Prasad Chaurasiya	BJP	NOM	11-May-2006	10-May-2012		
Nitish Kumar	JDU	MLA	07-May-2006	06-May-2012		
Nagmani	JDU	MLA	07-May-2006	25-Mar-2009		resigned
Narendra Singh	JDU	MLA	07-May-2006	06-May-2012		
Ramashray Prasad Singh	JDU	MLA	07-May-2006	06-May-2012		
Sushil Modi	BJP	MLA	07-May-2006	06-May-2012		
Tarakant Jha	BJP	MLA	07-May-2006	06-May-2012		
Baleshwar Singh Bharti	BJP	MLA	07-May-2006	06-May-2012		
Uday Narayan Rai	RJD	MLA	07-May-2006	06-May-2012		
Bhim Singh	RJD	MLA	07-May-2006	02-Jun-2009		defected to JDU
Chandan Bagchi	INC	MLA	07-May-2006	06-May-2012		
Sanjay Singh	LJP	MLA	07-May-2006	05-Jun-2009		defected to JDU on 5-Jun-2009
Ramchandra Prasad	RJD	MLA	22-Jul-2004	21-Jul-2010		
Mudrika Singh Yadav	RJD	MLA	22-Jul-2004	21-Jul-2010		
Ghulam Ghaus	RJD	MLA	22-Jul-2004	21-Jul-2010		
Ramvachan Rai	RJD	MLA	22-Jul-2004	21-Jul-2010		
Rambadan Roy	JDU	MLA	22-Jul-2004	17-Mar-2009		resigned
Birendra Kumar Chaudhary	JDU	MLA	22-Jul-2004	21-Jul-2010		
Kiran Ghai Sinha	BJP	MLA	22-Jul-2004	21-Jul-2010		
Rajesh Ram	Ind	West Champaran LA	17-Jul-2003	16-Jul-2009		
Kalavati Devi	Ind	East Champaran LA	17-Jul-2003	16-Jul-2009		
Dilip Kumar Yadav	Ind	Sitamarhi-Sheohar LA	17-Jul-2003	16-Jul-2009		
Samir Kumar Mahaseth	Ind	Madhubani LA	17-Jul-2003	16-Jul-2009		
Mohammed Azimuddin	Ind	Purnia-Araria-Kishanganj LA	17-Jul-2003	16-Jul-2009		
Mohan Lal Agrawal	Ind	Katihar LA	17-Jul-2003	16-Jul-2009		
Balram Singh Yadav	CPM	Saharsa-Madhepura-Supaul LA	17-Jul-2003	16-Jul-2009		
Mishri Lal Yadav	Ind	Darbhanga LA	17-Jul-2003	16-Jul-2009		
Dinesh Prasad Singh	Ind	Muzaffarpur LA	17-Jul-2003	16-Jul-2009		
Sunil Singh	Ind	Gopalganj LA	17-Jul-2003	16-Jul-2009		
Paramatma Ram	Ind	Siwan LA	17-Jul-2003	16-Jul-2009		
Raghuvansh Prasad Yadav	Ind	Saran LA	17-Jul-2003	16-Jul-2009		
Jagannath Rai	Ind	Vaishali LA	17-Jul-2003	16-Jul-2009		
Hari Narayan Choudhary	Ind	Samastipur LA	17-Jul-2003	16-Jul-2009		
Usha Sahani	CPI	Begusarai-Khagaria LA	17-Jul-2003	16-Jul-2009		
Sanjay Kumar	CPI	Bhagalpur-Banka LA	17-Jul-2003	16-Jul-2009		
Ravindra Yadav	Ind	Munger-Jamui-Lakhisarai- Sheikhpura LA	17-Jul-2003	16-Jul-2009		
Kapildev Singh	Ind	Nalanda LA	17-Jul-2003	16-Jul-2009		
Dilip Singh	Ind	Patna LA	17-Jul-2003	01-Oct-2006		expired
Laldas Rai	Ind	Bhojpur-Buxar LA	17-Jul-2003	16-Jul-2009		
Krishna Kumar Singh	Ind	Rohtas-Kaimur LA	17-Jul-2003	16-Jul-2009		
Ranjan Kumar Singh	Ind	Aurangabad LA	17-Jul-2003	16-Jul-2009		
Manorama Devi	Ind	Gaya-Jehanabad-Arwal LA	17-Jul-2003	16-Jul-2009		
Salman Raghib	Ind	Nawada LA	17-Jul-2003	16-Jul-2009		
Nagendra Prasad Singh	RJD	MLA	07-May-2002	06-May-2008		
Geeta Kumari	RJD	MLA	07-May-2002	06-May-2008		
Yunus Lohia	RJD	MLA	07-May-2002	06-May-2008		
Badshah Prasad Azad	RJD	MLA	07-May-2002	06-May-2008		
Giriraj Singh	BJP	MLA	07-May-2002	06-May-2008		
Kameshwar Choupal	BJP	MLA	07-May-2002	06-May-2008		
Vinay Kumar Sinha	SAP	MLA	07-May-2002	06-May-2008		
Tanweer Hassan	JDU	MLA	07-May-2002	06-May-2008		
Jyoti Devi	INC	MLA	07-May-2002	06-May-2008		
Nilamber Choudhary	INC	Darbhanga GR	07-May-2002	09-Sep-2006		expired
Azad Gandhi	RJD	Patna GR	07-May-2002	06-May-2008		
Devesh Chandra Thakur	Ind	Tirhut GR	07-May-2002	06-May-2008		
Virkeshwar Prasad Singh	BJP	Koshi GR	07-May-2002	06-May-2008		
Kedar Nath Pandey	CPI	Saran TR	07-May-2002	06-May-2008		
Nawal Kishore Yadav	RJD	Patna TR	07-May-2002	06-May-2008		
Narendra Prasad Singh	BJP	Tirhut TR	07-May-2002	06-May-2008		
Basudev Singh	CPM	Darbhanga TR	07-May-2002	06-May-2008		
Jabir Husain	RJD	MLA	07-May-2000	06-May-2006		
Ram Nandan Singh	RJD	MLA	07-May-2000	06-May-2006		
Kumar Rakesh Ranjan	RJD	MLA	07-May-2000	06-May-2006		
Upendra Kumar Singh						
Ram Karan Sahani						
Ganga Prasad Chaurasiya	BJP	MLA	07-May-2000	06-May-2006		
Baleshwar Singh Bharti	BJP	MLA	07-May-2000	06-May-2006		
Vijay Kumar Verma	JDU	MLA	07-May-2000	06-May-2006		
P. K. Sinha	SAP	MLA	07-May-2000	06-May-2006		
Chandan Bagchi	INC	MLA	07-May-2000	06-May-2006		
		MLA	12-Feb-1999	06-May-2000	1	bye - death of Ramanand Yadav
Subhash Prasad Yadav	RJD	MLA	22-Jul-1998	21-Jul-2004		
Ram Kripal Yadav	RJD	MLA	22-Jul-1998	21-Jul-2004		
Mangani Lal Mandal	RJD	MLA	22-Jul-1998	21-Jul-2004		
Ghulam Ghaus	RJD	MLA	22-Jul-1998	21-Jul-2004		
Khalid Anwar Ansari	RJD	MLA	22-Jul-1998	21-Jul-2004		
Bishun Deo Rai		MLA	22-Jul-1998	21-Jul-2004		
Ramdeo Sahu		MLA	22-Jul-1998	21-Jul-2004		
Saryu Roy	BJP	MLA	22-Jul-1998	21-Jul-2004		
Ram Nath Thakur	JD	MLA	07-May-1994	06-May-2000		
Indu Singh	JD	MLA	07-May-1994	06-May-2000		
Pramila Devi	JD	MLA	07-May-1994	06-May-2000		
Mahendra Sahni	JD	MLA	07-May-1994	06-May-2000		
Vishwa Mohan Chaudhary	JD	MLA	07-May-1994	06-May-2000		
Ramanand Yadav	INC	MLA	07-May-1994	29-Jul-1998		death
Umeshwar Prasad Verma	INC	MLA	07-May-1994	06-May-2000		
Thomas Hansda	INC	MLA	07-May-1994	06-May-2000		
Uma Shankar Shukla	MCC	MLA	07-May-1994	06-May-2000		
Subodh Roy	CPI	MLA	07-May-1994	06-May-2000		
Ganga Prasad Chaurasia	BJP	MLA	07-May-1994	06-May-2000		
Arun Kumar	INC	Gaya TR	18-Mar-1993	17-Mar-1999		
Awadhesh Narain Singh	BJP	South Chota Nagpur GR	18-Mar-1993	17-Mar-1999	1	
Ajay Almast	JD	MLA	21-Jul-1992	20-Jul-1998		
Gautam Sagar Rana	JD	MLA	21-Jul-1992	20-Jul-1998		
Mangani Lal Mandal	JD	MLA	21-Jul-1992	20-Jul-1998		
Ram Kripal Yadav	JD	MLA	21-Jul-1992	1993		elected to Patna Lok Sabha constituency
Ram Chandra Purve	JD	MLA	21-Jul-1992	20-Jul-1998		
Vijay Shankar Mishra	INC	MLA	21-Jul-1992	20-Jul-1998		
Laxmi Devi	INC	MLA	21-Jul-1992	20-Jul-1998		
Sylvia Bage	INC	MLA	21-Jul-1992	20-Jul-1998		
Raj Mangal Mishra	SJP	MLA	21-Jul-1992	20-Jul-1998		
Badri Narayan	CPI	MLA	21-Jul-1992	20-Jul-1998		
Tarakant Jha	BJP	MLA	21-Jul-1992	20-Jul-1998		
Bhagwat Jha Azad	INC	MLA	28-Apr-1988	27-Apr-1994		
Ramanand Yadav	INC	MLA	28-Apr-1988	27-Apr-1994		
Umeshwar Prasad Verma	INC	MLA	28-Apr-1988	27-Apr-1994		
Laliteshwar Jha	INC	MLA	28-Apr-1988	27-Apr-1994		
Fida Hussain Ansari	INC	MLA	28-Apr-1988	27-Apr-1994		
Stensila Hembrom	INC	MLA	28-Apr-1988	27-Apr-1994		
Vibhuti Kavi	INC	MLA	28-Apr-1988	27-Apr-1994		
Indu Devi	JP	MLA	28-Apr-1988	27-Apr-1994		
Ram Nath Thakur	LKD	MLA	28-Apr-1988	27-Apr-1994		
Chatrapati Sahi Munda	JMM	MLA	28-Apr-1988	27-Apr-1994		
Jagbandhu Adhikari	BJP	MLA	28-Apr-1988	27-Apr-1994		
Khalid Rashid Saba	INC	MLA	21-Jul-1986	20-Jul-1992		
Vijay Shankar Mishra	INC	MLA	21-Jul-1986	20-Jul-1992		
Nageshwar Prasad Singh	INC	MLA	21-Jul-1986	20-Jul-1992		
Brij Kishore Singh	INC	MLA	21-Jul-1986	20-Jul-1992		
Raj Kishore Prasad	INC	MLA	21-Jul-1986	20-Jul-1992		
Laxmi Devi	INC	MLA	21-Jul-1986	20-Jul-1992		
Sylvia Bage	INC	MLA	21-Jul-1986	20-Jul-1992		
Mangani Lal Mandal	LKD	MLA	21-Jul-1986	20-Jul-1992		
Ram Chandra Purve	LKD	MLA	21-Jul-1986	20-Jul-1992		
Tripurari Prasad Singh	JP	MLA	21-Jul-1986	20-Jul-1992		
