= Ashraf Asthanvi =

Indian activist and writer (1967–2022)

- اشرف استھانوی
- Born: Ziaul Ashraf; 2 February 1967; Asthawan, Nalanda district, Bihar
- Died: 15 November 2022 (aged 55); Fakirbara, Patna district, Bihar
- Education: Bachelor of Arts (Patna University)

Ashraf Asthanvi (2 February 1967 – 15 November 2022) was an Indian Social Activist, Journalist, Columnist and Writer of Urdu-language. He is the author of Adhyatmak Evam Manavta Ke Prateek Shaikh Sharfuddin Ahmad Yahya Maneri (2013), a biographical book on Sharfuddin Yahya Maneri and Professor Abdul Bari: Azeem Mujahid-e-Azadi Aur Bihar Ke Memar (2012), a biographical book on Professor Abdul Bari.

He was a regular contributor to Qaumi Awaaz, Qaumi Tanzeem, Inquilab-e-Jadeed, Mahnama Secular Bihar, Roznama Inquilab, Pindaar and Urdu Times. He has served as the Bihar State President of Awaami Urdu Nefaz Committee, and co-ordinator of All-India Urdu Forum.

== Early life and education ==
Ashraf Astanvi was born as Ziaul Ashraf on 2 February 1967 at Asthanwan, Nalanda district of Bihar.

He received his early education at local Maktab and completed Bachelor of Arts from Patna University in 1984.

== Literary works ==
- Asthanvi, Ashraf (2012). Professor Abdul Bari: Azeem Mujahid-e-Azadi Aur Bihar Ke Memar (in Urdu). Patna: Better World Mission.
- Asthanvi, Ashraf (2013). Adhyatmak Evam Manavta Ke Prateek Shaikh Sharfuddin Ahmad Yahya Maneri (in Hindi) (1st ed.). Patna: Alankar Printers.
- Asthanvi, Ashraf (2014). Tooti Slate, Aadhi Pencil Se Mukhya Mantri Ki Kursi Tak: Jitan Ram Manjhi (in Hindi). Patna: Alankar Printers.
- Asthanvi, Ashraf (2016). Sada-e-Jaras: Bihar Ke Anmol Ratn (in Hindi). Patna: Book Imporium. ISBN 978-81-925836-7-9.
- Forbesganj Ka Sach

== Awards ==
- Haroon Rashid Award (2011)

== Death ==
Ashraf Asthanvi died on 15 November 2022 at his residence in Fakirbara, Patna. He was laid to rest at Dhabri Qabristan on 17 November 2022. His Namaz-e-Janaza was held at Madrasa Muhammadia Asthawan and it was led by Maulana Atiqullah Qasmi. His death was condoled by Nitish Kumar, Tejashwi Yadav, Afaque Ahmed Khan, Khalid Anwar, Qari Sohaib and others.
