= Qamar Alam =

Indian politician

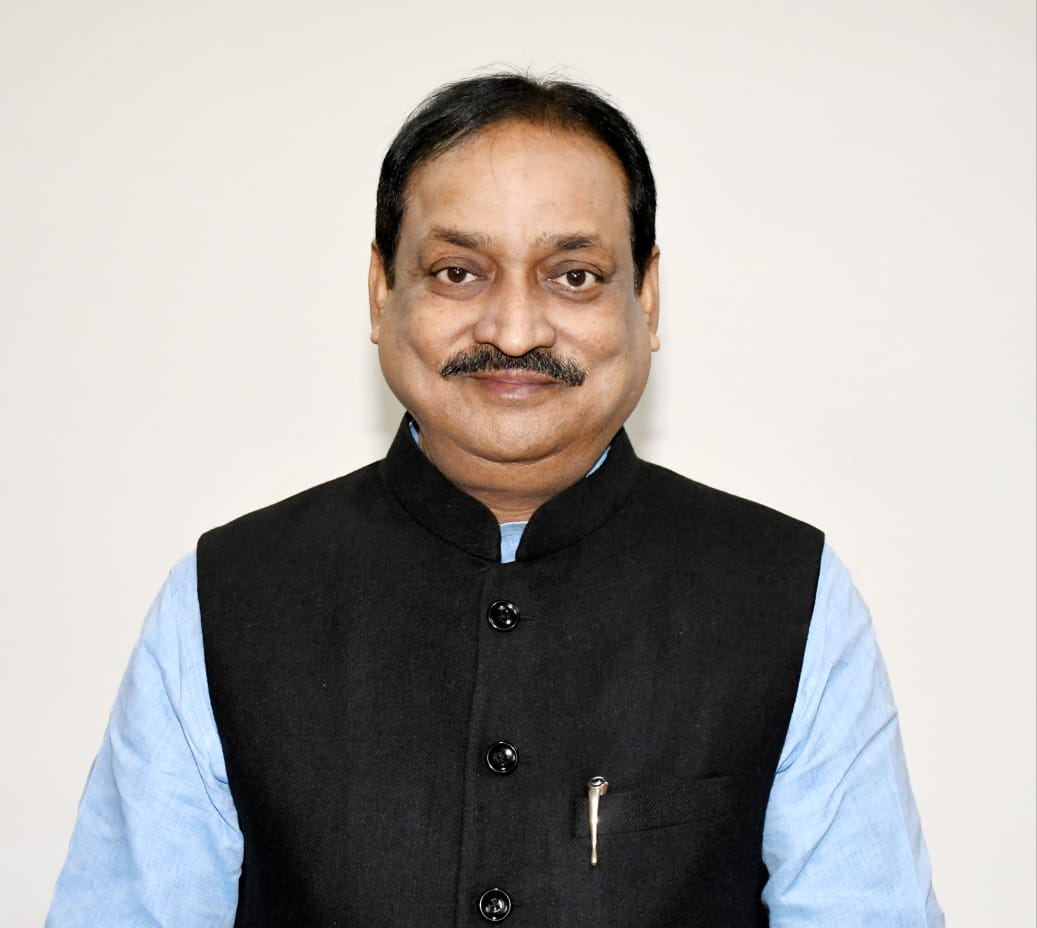

Member of the Bihar Legislative Council
- In office July 2016 – July 2022
- Constituency: elected by members of legislative assembly

Personal details
- Born: 2 October 1968 (age 57)
- Party: Janata Dal (United)
- Other political affiliations: Rashtriya Janata Dal

Qamar Alam (born 10 February 1968) is an Indian politician who served as a Member of the Bihar Legislative Council representing the Rashtriya Janata Dal and later joined Janata Dal (United). He along with Sanjay Prasad, Radha Charan Seth, Ranvijay Kumar Singh and Dilip Rai -met acting chairman of the legislative council Awadhesh Narain Singh and handed over their Merging Letter. He was elected unopposed to the Bihar Legislative Council on 3 June 2016. On 24 June 2020, they requested Awadhesh Narain Singh to allow their group to merge with JD(U).
