= Gaurishankar Dalmia =

Indian freedom fighter and politician

Member of the Bihar Legislative Assembly
- In office 1937–1952

Member of the Bihar Legislative Council
- In office 1952–1972

President of Bihar Chamber of Commerce & Industries
- In office 26 September 1977 – 17 September 1979

Personal details
- Born: November 12, 1910 Lakhisarai, Munger district, Bihar, British India
- Died: June 16, 1988 (aged 77)
- Party: Indian National Congress
- Occupation: Politician, freedom fighter, social reformer, philanthropist, journalist
- Known for: Role in Indian independence movement, promotion of the Santhali language, social service

Gaurishankar Dalmia was an Indian freedom fighter, politician, social reformer, philanthropist, and journalist. He was recognized for his contributions to India's independence movement and extensive charitable work.

== Early life ==
Gaurishankar Dalmia was born on November 12, 1910, in the village of Lakhisarai, in the Munger district of Bihar. He received his education in Kolkata. After the death of his father when he was 17 years old, Dalmia took charge of the family business.

== Career ==
Dalmia left his family business to engage in the Indian independence movement and moved to the village of Jasidih in the Santhal Pargana region. In 1926, influenced by Gandhian principles, he entered public life and took a vow to wear only Khadi (hand-spun cloth). He participated in the war for liberation and was jailed in 1931 as a result of his involvement in the Salt Satyagraha campaign.

He served as a member of the Bihar Legislative Assembly from 1937 to 1952 and as a member of the Bihar Legislative Council from 1952 to 1972.

He published a weekly magazine titled Prakash in Hindi and The Spark in English for approximately twenty years. In 1950s, he published several works in the Santhali language using the Nāgarī script. He advocated for the official government recognition of the Santhali language using the Nagri Script.

Dalmia served as the first General Secretary of the Santhal Paharia Seva Mandal, Deoghar. In 1936, he was selected as the president of the Santhal Pargana District Congress Committee. He also served as the President of the Bihar Chamber of Commerce & Industries from 26 September 1977 to 17 September 1979. He also founded the South Bihar Chamber of Commerce and served as its president for about two decades. Throughout his life, Dalmia was involved in various charitable activities. He did work in the areas of education, public health, leprosy eradication, rehabilitation of the disabled, upliftment of Adivasis, and promotion of naturopathy.

He died on 16 June 1988.

== Recognition ==
The Department of Posts in India issued a five-rupee commemorative stamp and a first day cover on November 12, 2009, in honor of Gaurishankar Dalmia.

== See also ==
- List of members of the Bihar Legislative Council
