= Binod Jaiswal =

Indian politician

Binod Kumar Jaishwal

MLC in Bihar Legislative Council
- Incumbent
- Assumed office 8 April 2022
- Constituency: Siwan

Personal details
- Party: Rashtriya Janata Dal
- Parent: Saligram prasad (father)

Binod Jaiswal is an Indian politician from Bihar. He has been a member of Bihar Legislative Council since 10 March 2022, representing Siwan. He is a member Rashtriya Janata Dal.
