= Khurshid Mohsin =

Indian politician

Syed Khurshid Muhammad Mohsin

Member of the Bihar Legislative Council
- In office 7 May 2018 – 12 January 2019
- Succeeded by: Sanjay Kumar Jha

Personal details
- Died: 12 January 2019
- Party: Rashtriya Janata Dal (1997-2019)
- Other political affiliations: Janata Party (1977-1997)
- Parent: Syed Wasiuddin Ahmad (father)
- Education: Bachelor of Arts
- Alma mater: Mirza Ghalib College, Magadh University

Syed Khurshid Mohammad Mohsin (1952-12 January 2019) was an Indian politician who had served as a Member of the Bihar Legislative Council from May 7, 2018 till his death on January 12, 2019. He was elected by the Members of the Bihar Legislative Assembly with 11 other candidates including Ramchandra Purve.

== Early life and education ==
Syed Khurshid Muhammad Mohsin was born to former Member of the Bihar Legislative Assembly from the Biharsharif Assembly constituency, Syed Wasiuddin Ahmad who got elected in 1960 by-election when Syed Aquil died and again in 1962 in Mirdad, Bihar Sharif Nalanda district, Bihar in 1952.

He had completed his study in Bachelor of Arts from the Mirza Ghalib College, Gaya under Magadh University in year 1978.

== Personal life ==
Syed Khurshid Muhammad Mohsin was married to Shahla Khurshid and they had two sons and one daughter together.
