= Ghulam Ghaus (Indian politician) =

Indian politician

Ghulam Ghaus is an Indian politician. He was elected to the Bihar Legislative Council as the Nominated member from Rashtriya Janata Dal. He was the leader of Bihar Legislative Council from 2005 to 2010. He is the nephew of late freedom fighter and Minister and Speaker of Bihar Assembly Ghulam Sarwar.
