= Rambali Singh Chandravanshi =

Member of Legislative Council Ram Bali Singh Chandravanshi
- Born: 15 October 1963 (age 62); Ojha Bigha, Baidrabad
- Citizenship: India
- Education: I.Sc, B.Sc, M.Sc, LLB, Ph.D From Patna University
- Occupations: Professor, Politician
- Political party: Rashtriya Janata Dal
- Spouse: Gita Devi
- Father: Ramanand Singh

Ram Bali Singh Chandravanshi (born 15 October 1963) is an Indian politician from the state of Bihar. Since the elections on June 29, 2020, he has been a member of the Bihar Legislative Council. He is also the President of Rashtriya Janata Dal Extremely Backward Cell. He currently also serves as an associate prof in Bihar National College of Patna University.

== Early life and career ==
He was born in a poor family of Village Ojha Bigha, Post Baidrabad, District Arwal on 15 October 1963. His father was Ramanand Singh. He is currently designated as HOD and Assistant Professor in Geology Department of BN College, Patna University. He also serves as an associate professor in Bihar National College of Patna University.

== Education ==
He Post Graduated in M.Sc. from Patna Science College (Department of Geology) from Patna University in 1987. He later completed his LLB and got a degree in 1991 from Patna Law College under Patna University. Then he completed his PhD degree from Patna University in the year 2002.

== Political career ==
He started his political career with the Rashtriya Janata Dal Party, He has made many movements at the district level and state level for the upliftment of the poor, dalit, backward and extremely backward society. Rashtriya Janata Dal Party delegated him the state president of the Extremely Backward Cell, later [] as a member of Bihar Legislative Council on 29 June 2020.
