= Tunna (name) =

Tunna is both a given name and a surname, also a nickname. Notable people with the name include:

- Tunna Pandey, Indian politician
- Norman Tunna (1908–1970), British railway worker
- Tuomas "Tunna" Milonoff, Finnish media person, TV-show host, and writer
