= Rannvijay Singh =

Rannvijay Singh may refer to:

- Rannvijay Singha, Indian actor and television personality
- Rannvijay Singh (politician), member of Bihar Legislative Council

== See also ==
- Rannvijay Singh Gonda, member of Uttar Pradesh Legislative Council
