= Shweta Maurya =

Indian woman athlete

- Born: 27 September 1999 (age 26); New Delhi, India
- Education: .
- Organization: Ambassador of Fit India Movement
- Children: 2
- Awards: Nari Shakti Samman (2020); The WOW! Awards (2021)

Shweta Maurya (born 27 September 1999) is an Indian marathoner and model. She is the Ambassador of FIT India Movement. She is felicitated with the Guinness Book of World Records.

== Awards and honors ==
She has been mentioned in Guinness Book of World Records, felicitated by CPWA Awards 2021 and The WOW! Awards.

Nari Shakti Samman 2020. She had been a participant of Hyderabad Marathon and World 10K Bangalore. She is brand ambassador of IPA Neerathon 2023 held in April 2023.
