= Ashok Pandey (disambiguation) =

Ashok Pandey may refer to:

- Ashok Kumar Pandey, an Indian politician from Bihar
- Ashok Pandey, an Indian biotechnologist from Kanpur
