= Hyderabad Marathon =

Annual marathon held in Hyderabad, India

- Date: Last sunday of August
- Location: Hyderabad, Telangana, India
- Distance: Marathon, half marathon, 10K, 5K
- Primary sponsor: NMDC
- Established: 2011
- Course records: Men's: 2:17:27 (2025); Francis Cheruiyot; Women's: 2:39:27 (2025); Millicent Jemutai Kibet
- Website: Official website

The NMDC Hyderabad Marathon, is an annual marathon competition held in Hyderabad every year. It is the second largest marathon in India after the Mumbai Marathon

== History ==
The culture of marathon running was begun as a non-profit organization in 2007. Airtel was the title sponsor of the race for more than a decade, starting from the 2011 edition. In 2022, a Hyderabad based public sector unit NMDC became the title sponsor.

== Past winners ==
Key: Course record

Edition	Year	Men's winner	Time (h:m:s)	Women's winner	Time (h:m:s)
1st	2011	Harun Ali (IND)	2:42:58	Sudha M (IND)	3:13:15
2nd	2012	Anil Thakur (IND)	2:52:40	Sudha More (IND)	3:17:27
3rd	2013	Ram Singh Yadav (IND)	2:31:31	Jyoti Singh (IND)	3:23:56
4th	2014	Karan Singh (IND)	2:24:54	Shyamili Sing (IND)	3:23:37
5th	2015	Titus Kariuki (KEN)	2:32:17	Jyoti Gawate (IND)	3:05:53
6th	2016	Meswin Balcha (ETH)	2:32:14	Jyoti Gawate (IND)	2:59:07
7th	2017	Indrajeet Yadav (IND)	2:31:05	Jyoti Gawate (IND)	3:07:59
8th	2018	Karan Singh (IND)	2:30:16	Pascalia Chepkoech (KEN)	2:51:45
9th	2019	Berhanu Heye (ETH)	2:26:10	Rosina Kiboino (KEN)	2:55:26
	2020	Canceled due to the COVID-19 pandemic			
10th	2021	Stephen Kibet (KEN)	2:23:52	Sonika Sonika (IND)	2:56:07
11th	2022	Pradeep Singh (IND)	2:31:22	Monica Cheruto (KEN)	2:50:25
12th	2023	Thonakal Gopi (IND)	2:23:38	Tamsi Singh (IND)	3:06:24
13th	2024	Hammington Kimaiyo (KEN)	2:26:06	Sheila Chebet (KEN)	2:39:24
14th	2025	Francis Cheruiyot (KEN)	2:17:27	Millicent Jemutai Kibet (KEN)	2:39:27
15th	2026	Seboka Negusse (ETH)	2:20:57	Emanu Seifu (ETH)	2:46:29
