= Ashok Kumar Pandey =

Indian politician

Ashok Kumar Pandey is an Indian politician, and a member of the Rashtriya Janata Dal (RJD) party. He is a member of the Bihar Legislative Council.

== See also ==
- List of members of the Bihar Legislative Council
