= Sanjeev Kumar Singh =

Indian politician (born 1965)

- Incumbent
- Assumed office 9 May 2023

Member of Bihar Legislative Council
- Constituency: Koshi elected from the Teachers Constituency

Personal details
- Born: 1 November 1965 (age 60) Madrauni Pachhiarital, Rangra chouk, Bhagalpur, Bihar, India
- Party: Janata Dal (United)
- Children: 1 son 1 daughter
- Parent: Sharda Prasad Singh (father)
- Education: BSEP (Matriculation); TMBU (Intermediate, B.A. Hons., M.A., Ph.D.)
- Occupation: Teacher; Politician

Sanjeev Kumar Singh (born 1 November 1965) is an Indian politician, currently affiliated with the Janata Dal (United) party and serving as a member of the Bihar Legislative Council since 2023. He was elected as MLC from the Teachers Constituency.

== Early life ==
Singh was born to Sharda Prasad Singh in 1965 in a prominent Rajput family of Madrauni Village of Rangra in Bhagalpur, Bihar. His father was highly respected teacher and prominent MLC .

== Education ==
During his early years, Singh studied under the BSEB curriculum. After his matriculation exams in 1981, he obtained a Bachelor of Arts in 1984 from Bhagalpur University and then subsequently received a Master of Arts degree in 1986 from the same university.

== Personal life ==
Singh has one son and one daughter.

== Political career ==
Singh previously won three MLC elections from the Teachers constituency. His father Sharda Prasad Singh was also prominent leader and 6 Times MLC from Kosi Teachers' Constituency.
