= Rozina Nazish =

Member of Bihar Legislative Council

Member of the Bihar Legislative Council
- Incumbent
- Assumed office 27 September 2021
- Preceded by: Tanveer Akhtar
- Constituency: Elected by MLAs

Personal details
- Party: Janata Dal (United)
- Spouse: Tanveer Akhtar

Rozina Nazish is an Indian Politician from the State of Bihar. She is elected by MLAs as Member of Bihar Legislative Council from Janata Dal (United) since 27 September 2021.

== Personal life ==
Tanveer Akhtar was husband of Rozina, after Akhtar's death Rozina became a member of Bihar Legislative Council.
