= Bharti Mehta =

Indian politician

Bharti Mehta is an Indian politician who is serving as a Member of the Bihar Legislative Council since June 2026. She is associated with the Janata Dal (United), a regional political party based in Bihar as the State President of Party's Women's Wing. She was elected unopposed with 9 other people. She was the Chairman of Sanskrit Education Board.
