= Prem Kumar Mani =

Indian writer, thinker (born 1953)

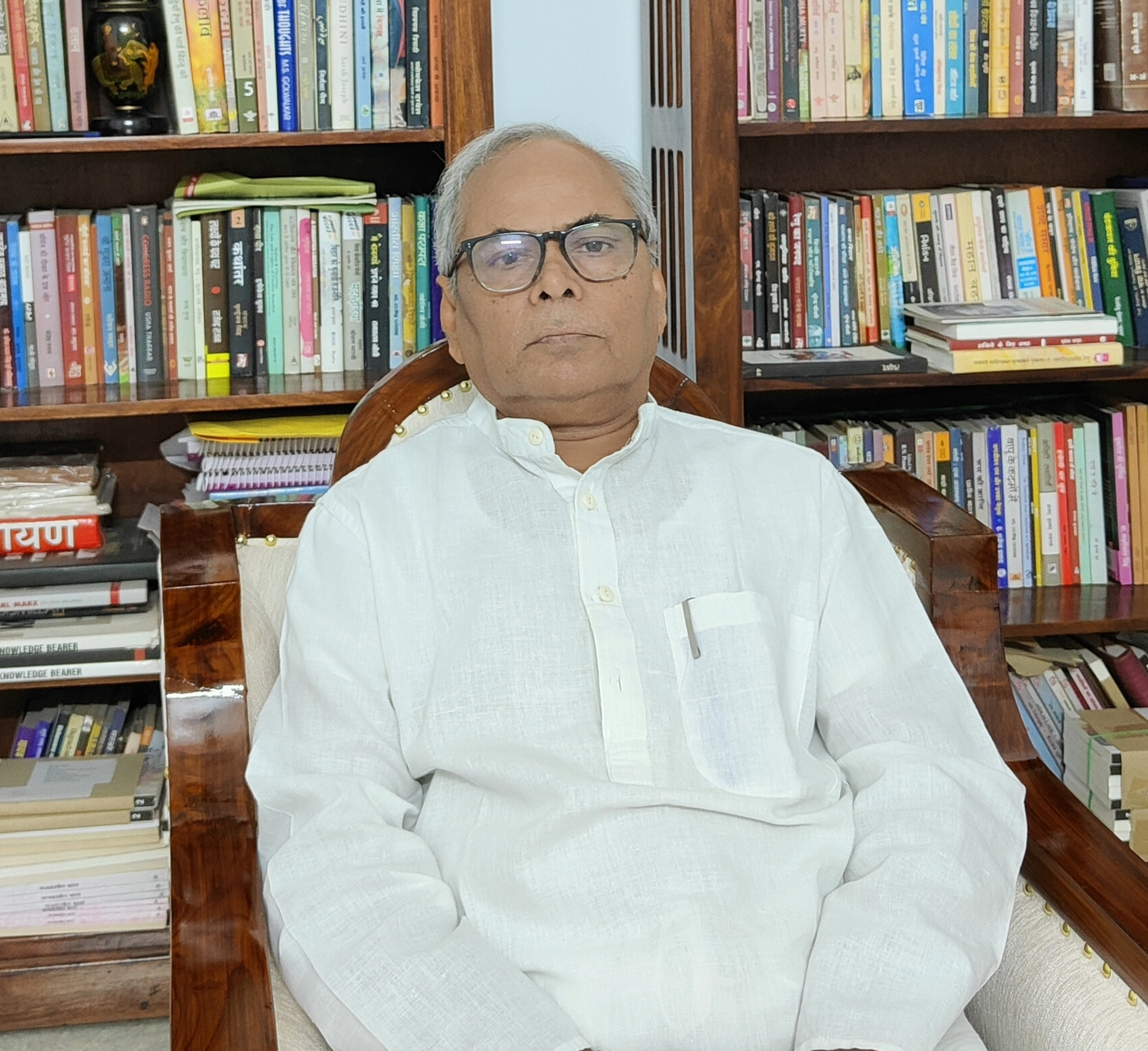

Member of the Bihar Legislative Council
- In office 2006–2011

Personal details
- Born: 25 July 1953 (age 73) Bihar, India
- Party: Rashtriya Janata Dal (2011–present); Janata Dal (United) (till 2011)

Prem Kumar Mani (born 25 July 1953) is a writer, thinker and a political activist from Bihar India. He is well-known for his writings, both fiction and non-fiction, meant for the upliftment of the lower strata of society. He also worked as a journalist in the past.

== Early life ==
Mani was born to Valmiki Mani, a freedom fighter of Bihar. During the initial part of his life, he came in the contact of Buddhist monk Jagdish Kashyap and spent some time getting baptism at Nalanda Mahavihar, a notable Budhhist site. Later, he started his career as a journalist with his first work as Manusmriti, ek pratikriya. Mani is married to Mamta Mani and is a father of three children.

== Writer ==
Prem Kumar Mani started writing short stories from 1977. His four short story collections are Andhere Me Akele (1990), Ghas Ke Gehne (1993), Khos Thatha Anya Kahaniyan (2000), and Upsanhar (2000). He also wrote a novel titled Dhalan in 2000.

== Thinker ==
As a social and political thinker Mani has written more than 500 articles on contemporary issues with a deep sense of commitment to social justice. His writings have influenced the people at large in society.

One of his articles titled Why this celebration of Death published in an online magazine named Countercurrents became a topic of intense debate in the Indian Parliament.

He has compiled a work on the life and time of social reformer Jyotiba Phule.

== Awards ==
Mani has been awarded with Srikant verma smriti puruskar for his essays as well as with Vishesh Sahitya Seva Samman (in 1993) by Government of Bihar. He received the first Satrachi Puraskar in 2021 for his writings dedicated to social justice by Satrachi Foundation.

== Political career ==
Mani was nominated to the Bihar legislative council as a member of Janata Dal (United) in 2006 and was ousted from the party for anti-party activities in 2011. In the meantime, he was suspended from the Bihar legislative council by the sitting chairman. Mani however filed a suit challenging the council chairman's jurisdiction over his suspension order. Mani was ousted from the party following the complaint from JD (U) chief whip on the charge of collusion with Upendra Kushwaha, a rebel leader of JD (U) who assumed several high positions in the party. Following Mani's suspension the party suspended him along with other senior leaders such as Lalan Singh for criticising the policy of chief minister Nitish Kumar. Mani was close to Nitish Kumar since the formation of Samata Party and was among the policy formulators of the party until he was ousted in 2011. After joining Rashtriya Janata Dal he was elevated to the position of vice president of the party in 2021 as a part of RJD's Luv-Kush response to those of JD (U)'s.

Mani resigned from all the offices of the Rashtriya Janata Dal (RJD) in 2022, accusing Lalu Prasad Yadav of weakening the organizational structure of the party on various occasions. Prior to his resignation, he was also the editor of the official mouthpiece of RJD.
