= Lal Babu Prasad =

Indian politician from Bihar

Member of Bihar Legislative Council
- In office 7 May 2012 – 6 May 2018
- Succeeded by: Sanjay Paswan
- Constituency: elected by the members of Legislative Assembly

Personal details
- Born: 16 March 1962 (age 63) Narkatiaganj, West Champaran, Bihar
- Party: Bharatiya Janata Party
- Spouse: Mala Devi
- Children: 2 sons, 1 daughter
- Occupation: Politician

Lal Babu Prasad is an Indian politician from the Bharatiya Janata Party, Bihar who served as the member of Bihar Legislative Council from 2012 till 2018. He has served in various capacities in the organization of the BJP as the President of the BJYM, Bihar from 1995 till 1997, Vice President of the Bharatiya Janata Party, Bihar in 2004. He had contested 1990 Bihar Legislative Assembly election from Chanpatia but had lost to Krishna Kumar Mishra of the Janata Dal.

== Controversy ==
Prasad was suspended from the primary membership of the BJP on 31-Mar-2017 for misbehaving with female legislator Nutan Singh, who is the wife of BJP's Chhatapur MLA Neeraj Kumar Singh Bablu. Singh, who was then a LJP MLC, had accused Prasad of “improper behaviour” while they were walking up a flight of stairs inside the Council building on Wednesday. Her husband reportedly hit Prasad in the council.
