= Lalan Prasad =

- ललन प्रसाद

Member of the Bihar Legislative Council
- Incumbent
- Assumed office June 2026
- Preceded by: Nitish Kumar

Personal details
- Born: Sujawalpur, Sheikhpura district, Bihar
- Party: Janata Dal (United)

Lalan Prasad is an Indian politician who is serving as a Member of the Bihar Legislative Council since June 2026. He is associated with the Janata Dal (United), a regional political party based in Bihar. He was elected unopposed on the vacant seat of Nitish Kumar, former Chief Minister of Bihar with 9 other people.

== Early life ==
Lalan Prasad is from the Sujawalpur village under Ghat Kosumbha Block of Sheikhpura district in Bihar.
