= Kiran Ghai =

Indian politician

Member of Bihar Legislative Council
- In office 22 July 2004 – 21 July 2016
- Constituency: elected by members of Legislative Assembly

Personal details
- Born: 23 August 1949 (age 77) Digha, Patna, Bihar
- Party: Bharatiya Janata Party
- Parent: Ramprakash Ghai (father)
- Education: Patna University (M.A.)
- Profession: Professor, Politician

Kiran Ghai (born 23 August 1949) is a national vice president of the Bharatiya Janata Party. She is an MLC in Bihar state in India, and Chairperson of Child Protection and Women empowerment committee of Bihar Legislative Council.

Earlier she was the national secretary of BJP. She is also a reader in the department of Hindi Patna Women's College, a constituent unit of Patna University, Patna. She has been a jury member for the 48th and 50th Indian Nation Film Awards, in the categories of feature and non-feature films. She has been a local board member (Eastern Zone, Reserve Bank of India). Mrs. Kiran Ghai is also a poet and a playwright. She is resident of Mainpuri, Patna.
