= Ajay Kumar Singh (Bihar politician, Rashtriya Janata Dal) =

Indian politician

Member of the Bihar Legislative Council
- Incumbent
- Assumed office April 2022
- Constituency: Local Bodies, Munger, Lakhisarai, Jamui & Sheikhpura

Personal details
- Political party: Rashtriya Janata Dal
- Parent: Nathuni Prasad Singh
- Profession: Social Work, Business

Ajay Kumar Singh is an Indian politician, currently a member of Rashtriya Janata Dal and a Member of Legislative Council in the Bihar Legislative Council.
