= Rajan Singh =

Indian politician

Member of Bihar Legislative Council
- In office 17 July 2015 – 16 July 2021
- Preceded by: Ranjan Kumar Singh
- Succeeded by: Dilip Singh
- Constituency: Aurangabad Local Authorities

Personal details
- Born: Deo Aurangabad, Bihar
- Party: Bharatiya Janata Party
- Spouse: Nilam Singh
- Education: Magadh University
- Profession: Politician

Rajan Singh also known as a Rajan Kumar Singh is a politician and leader of Bharatiya Janata Party and former member of the Bihar Legislative Council from Aurangabad district, Bihar.
