= Harendra Pratap Pandey =

Indian politician

Member of Bihar Legislative Council
- In office 22 July 2010 – 21 July 2016
- Succeeded by: Vinod Narayan Jha
- Constituency: elected by the members of Legislative Assembly

Personal details
- Born: 8 November 1950 (age 74); Nawanagar, Buxar, Bihar
- Political party: Bharatiya Janata Party
- Parent: Shiv Vilas Pandey (father)
- Occupation: Politician

Harendra Pratap Pandey is an Indian politician from the Bharatiya Janata Party, Bihar who served as the member of Bihar Legislative Council from 2010 till 2016. He has served in various capacities in the organization of the BJP as the Bihar State General Secretary (Organization) from 2001 to 2006, prabhari of BJP Assam & BJP Sikkim from 2007 to 2010, BJP Jharkhand from 2010 to 2014.
