= Md Sohaib =

Indian politician

Md Sohaib commonly known as Qari Sohaib is an Indian politician Member of the Bihar Legislative Council since 2022 representing party Rashtriya Janata Dal (RJD). He is the President of Youth Wing of Rashtriya Janata Dal, BIhar.
