= Ashraf Ansari =

Indian politician

Ashraf Ansari is an Indian politician who is serving as a Member of the Bihar Legislative Council since June 2026. He is associated with the Lok Janshakti Party (Ram Vilas), a regional political party based in Bihar. He was elected unopposed with 9 other people.
