= Tanveer Akhtar =

Indian politician (died 2021)

Member of Bihar Legislative Council
- Incumbent
- Assumed office 2016-2021
- Preceded by: Vijay Kumar Verma
- Succeeded by: Rozina Nazish

Personal details
- Died: 8 May 2021
- Party: Janata Dal (United)
- Spouse: Rozina Nazish

Tanveer Akhtar (died 8 May 2021) was an Indian politician from Janata Dal (United) and was member of Bihar Legislative Council.

== Biography ==
He previously served as vice-president of the Bihar unit of the Indian National Congress. He was also Jawaharlal Nehru University Students' Union President and Bihar Pradesh Youth Congress President earlier. He later joined Janata Dal (United) in Bihar. He died due to COVID-19 on 8 May 2021.
