= Sanjay Kumar Singh (CPI politician) =

Indian politician

Sanjay Kumar Singh is an Indian politician and leader of Communist Party of India from Bihar. He was a former Member of Bihar Legislative Council elected from Teachers Constituency.

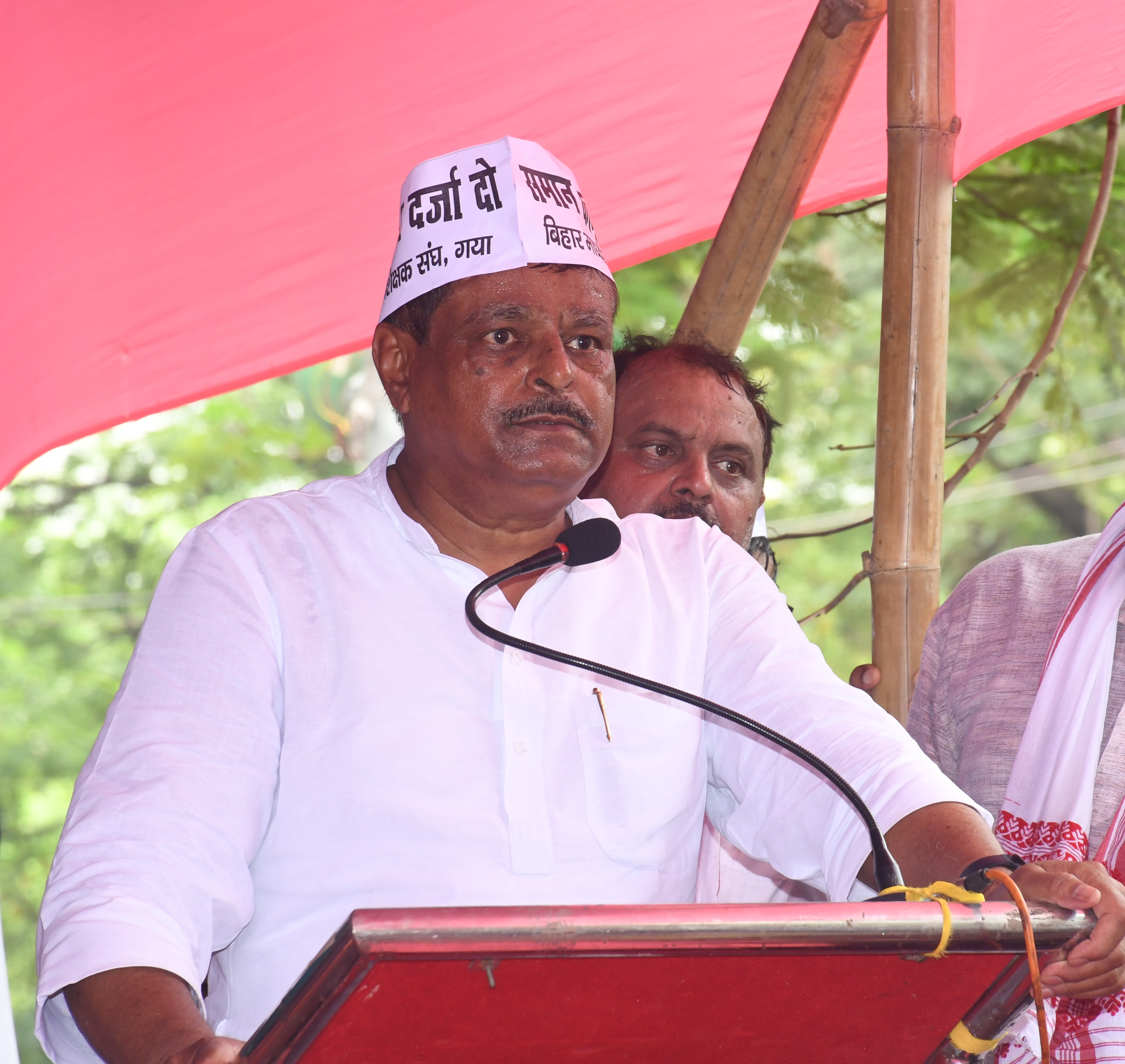
Sanjay Kumar Singh, member of the Bihar Legislative Council, addressing a protest by Nyojit teachers at Gardnibag, Patna, India. Date: 11 July 2023

He has served as professor of psychology for more than 40 years. He was first elected in 2014 and re-elected in 2020. He is also the General secretary of Bihar University Teachers association (BUTA) since 1992 and General secretary of Federation of University Teachers association of Bihar (FUTAB) since 2006. He has also served in past as National Secretary of All Indian Federation of University and College teachers association (AIFUCTO). He is active in politics from his student life only and served as the President of the Student union at Bihar University. In past he was also the member of the senate and Syndicate body of the Bihar University. He was defeated in 2026 by BJP nominee Narendra Singh, where he came third..
