= Rudal Rai =

Indian politician

Rudal Rai is an Indian politician. He was elected to the Bihar Legislative Council in Bihar in the Elected by Legislative Assembly Members as a member of the Janata Dal (United).
