= Suraj Nandan Kushwaha =

Indian politician

Member of Bihar Legislative Council
- In office 7 May 2014 – 28 December 2018
- Succeeded by: Radha Mohan Sharma
- Constituency: elected by Members of Legislative Assembly

Personal details
- Born: 6 May 1957
- Died: 28 December 2018 (aged 61) Patna, Bihar
- Political party: Bharatiya Janata Party
- Parent: Ramdev Kushwaha (father)
- Education: M.A., PhD
- Occupation: Professor, Politician

Suraj Nandan Kushwaha was an Indian politician from Bharatiya Janata Party, Bihar who served as the member of Bihar Legislative Council from 2014 till his death in 2018. He had served as the General Secretary of the Bharatiya Janata Party, Bihar. He also served as the National President of the Rashtrawadi Kushwaha Parishad.

== Life and political career ==
Kushwaha was the president of an organisation called "Rashtravadi Kushwaha Parishad", which was working for the identification of Koeri caste with the Mauryan Emperors. He organised several programs to support this claim, which was also supported by Bhartiya Janata Party. Earlier, he used to carry "Mehta" surname, but latter chose "Kushwaha" as the surname to make his identity more specific to the Koeri or Kushwaha caste. Kushwaha died on 28 December 2018 late night after a cardiac arrest.
