= Urmila Thakur =

Indian politician

Member of Bihar Legislative Council
- Incumbent
- Assumed office 7 May 2024
- Constituency: elected by legislative members

Personal details
- Born: 1968 (age 57–58) Dunhi, Garhpura, Begusarai, Bihar, India
- Party: Rashtriya Janata Dal
- Spouse: Ashok Kumar
- Parent: Awadhesh Thakur (father)
- Education: B.N.M.U (M.Sc. (Chemistry), Ph.D., LLB, B.T.)
- Profession: Politician, Social worker

Urmila Thakur is an Indian politician currently serving as the member of the Bihar Legislative Council and the member of the Rashtriya Janata Dal.

== Early life ==
Thakur was born in 1968 to Awadhesh Thakur.

== Personal life ==
She is married to Ashok Kumar.

== Education ==
Thakur completed her master's degree in (M.Sc. (Chemistry), Ph.D., LLB, B.T.) from B.N.M.U, Madhepura, Bihar, India.
