= Dilip Kumar Choudhary =

Indian politician

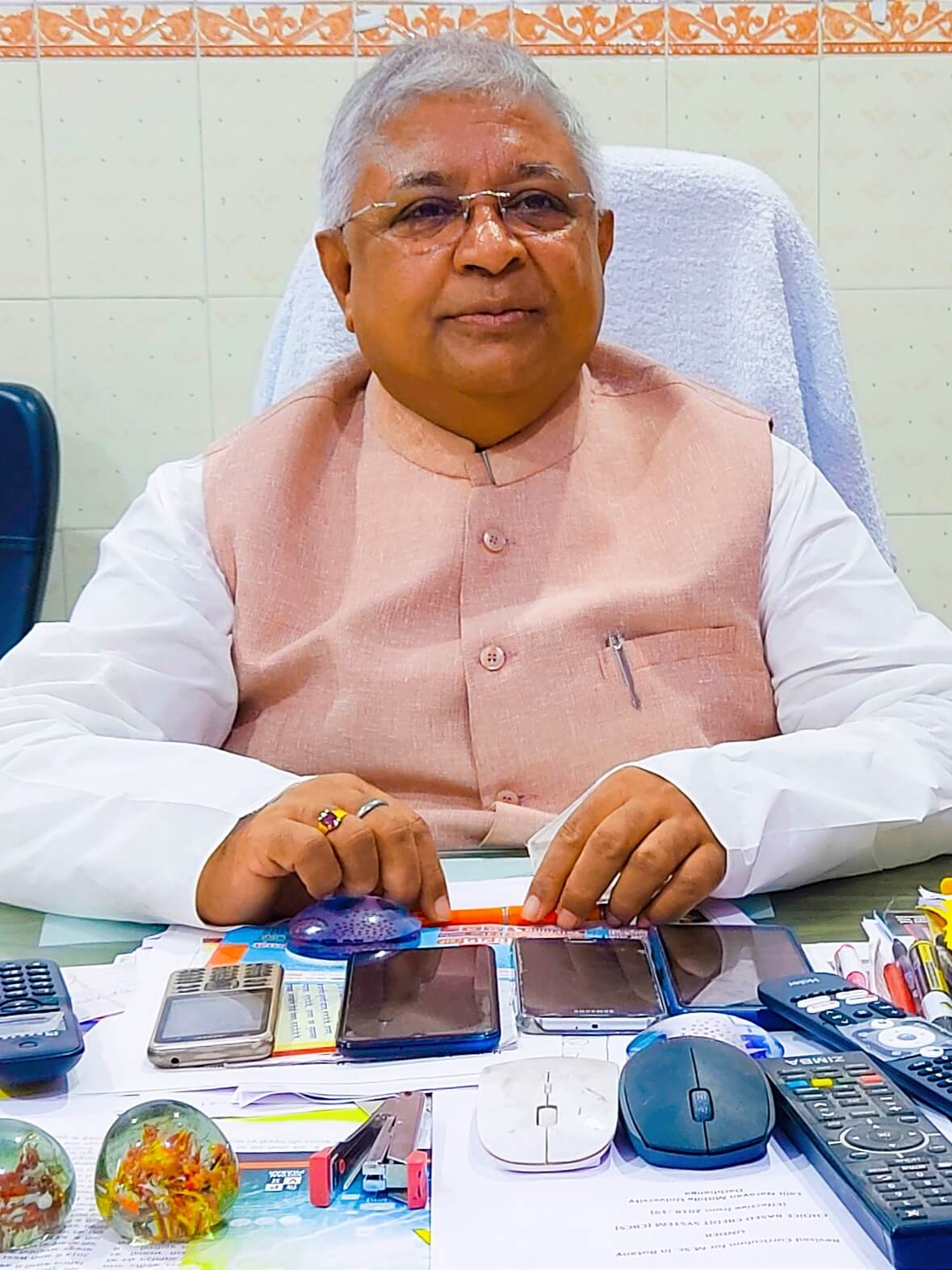

Ex Member of Bihar Legislative Council
- Constituency: Darbhanga

Personal details
- Born: 6 September 1964 (age 61) Darbhanga, Bihar, India
- Party: Janata Dal (United)
- Other political affiliations: Indian National Congress
- Spouse: Dr. Seema Choudhary

Dilip Kumar Choudhary is an Indian politician from Darbhanga Graduate Constituency in Bihar. He was a Member of the Bihar Legislative Council two times, since 2007 and 2014. From the year 1990 to 2002, he was a councillor of Darbhanga Municipal Corporation. He completed his master's degree in chemistry subject from Lalit Narayan Mithila University and Ph.D. from Allahabad University. Choudhary is a professor of chemistry in Chandradhari Mithila Vigyan Mahavidyalaya at Lalit Narayan Mithila University, Darbhanga. Since February 2022, he is also principal of C.M. Science College along with the charge of C. M. Law College, Darbhanga. His father, Late Dr. Nilambar Chaudhary was also a Senior Leader of the Indian National Congress and a member of the Bihar Legislative Council multiple times from Darbhanga Graduate Constituency.

== Political career ==
Choudhary was elected for Darbhanga (Graduate Constituency) as an Indian National Congress Supported candidate in 2007 and 2014. From the year 1990 to 2002, he was a councillor for Darbhanga Municipal Corporation.

He worked as General Secretary in Lalit Narayan Mithila University (Sangh) Shikshak Sangh and Bihar State University (Sangh) Shikshak Mahasangh, as well as in Lalit Narayan Mithila University and Kameshwar Singh Darbhanga Sanskrit University.

For ten years he was the elected unopposed member in the Syndicate and a lifetime Senate Member of both Varsities.

In student life, he was active in student politics and Student union elections under the banner of NSUI.

In 2018, he left the Indian National Congress and joined Janta Dal United. He is now a member of Janata Dal (United).
