= Kedar Nath Pandey =

Indian politician (1943–2022)

Kedar Nath Pandey (1 January 1943 – 24 October 2022) was an Indian politician and leader of Communist Party of India from Bihar. He was a Member of Bihar Legislative Council Elected from Teachers Constituency.

== Social and political activities ==
- On the post of Secretary of Hindi Sahitya Sammelan, Siwan
- On the post of Secretary of Bhojpuri Sahitya Sammelan, Siwan
- From 1973 to 77 and from 1981 to 85 on the post of General Secretary of Bihar Secondary Teacher Association, Jamal Road, Patna.
- From 1992 onwards as General Secretary of Bihar Secondary Teachers Association, Jamal Road, Patna.
- Member of Indo-Soviet Friendship Alliance, Indo-German Friendship Alliance
- Patron Member of the Society for Science
- Officers in All India Secondary Teachers Federation and many other socio-cultural institutions
- Working President, All India Bhojpuri Sahitya Sammelan, Patna.
- Former State Vice President of Indian People's Theatre Association (IPTA)
- Officer in Bihar Progressive Writers Association
- Presently a new member of the Bihar Legislative Council from 7 May 2002 and the chairman of the request committee of the council.

== Career ==
Part time Professor of Education in Vidya Bhawan College, Siwan from 1973–75.
