= Jeevan Kumar =

Indian politician

Member of Bihar Legislative Council
- Incumbent
- Assumed office 9 May 2023
- Preceded by: Sanjeev Shyam Singh
- Constituency: Gaya Teachers

Personal details
- Born: 2 February 1979 (age 47) Pareo Bihta, Patna district, Bihar
- Party: Bharatiya Janata Party
- Spouse: Jyoti Soni
- Children: 2 sons
- Parent: Ashok Kumar (father)
- Education: Graduate
- Profession: Politician

Jeevan Kumar is an Indian politician from Bharatiya Janata Party, Bihar and a member of Bihar Legislative Council representing Gaya Teachers constituency since 9 May 2023.
