= Shivrani Devi Prajapati =

Indian politician

Shivrani Devi Prajapati is an Indian politician who has served as a member of the Bihar Legislative Council since June 2026. She is associated with the Janata Dal (United), a regional political party based in Bihar. She was elected unopposed with 9 other people.
