= Rannvijay Singh (politician) =

Indian politician

Member of Bihar Legislative Council
- Incumbent
- Assumed office 2016-
- Preceded by: Rudal Roy, Janata Dal (United)

Personal details
- Party: Janata Dal (United)
- Other political affiliations: Rashtriya Janata Dal
- As of June 7, 2016

Rannvijay Singh was elected unopposed to the Bihar Legislative Council on 3 June 2016. He is a member of Janata Dal (United). He is a former member of Rashtriya Janata Dal. On 23 June 2020 he along with four other MLCS merged with JD(U). He was again elected as a Member of Bihar Legislative Council on MLA quota in 2022.

He was in talks of fighting the Bihar Legislative Assembly election from Barhara, but it could not materialize.
