= Radha Mohan Sharma =

Indian politician

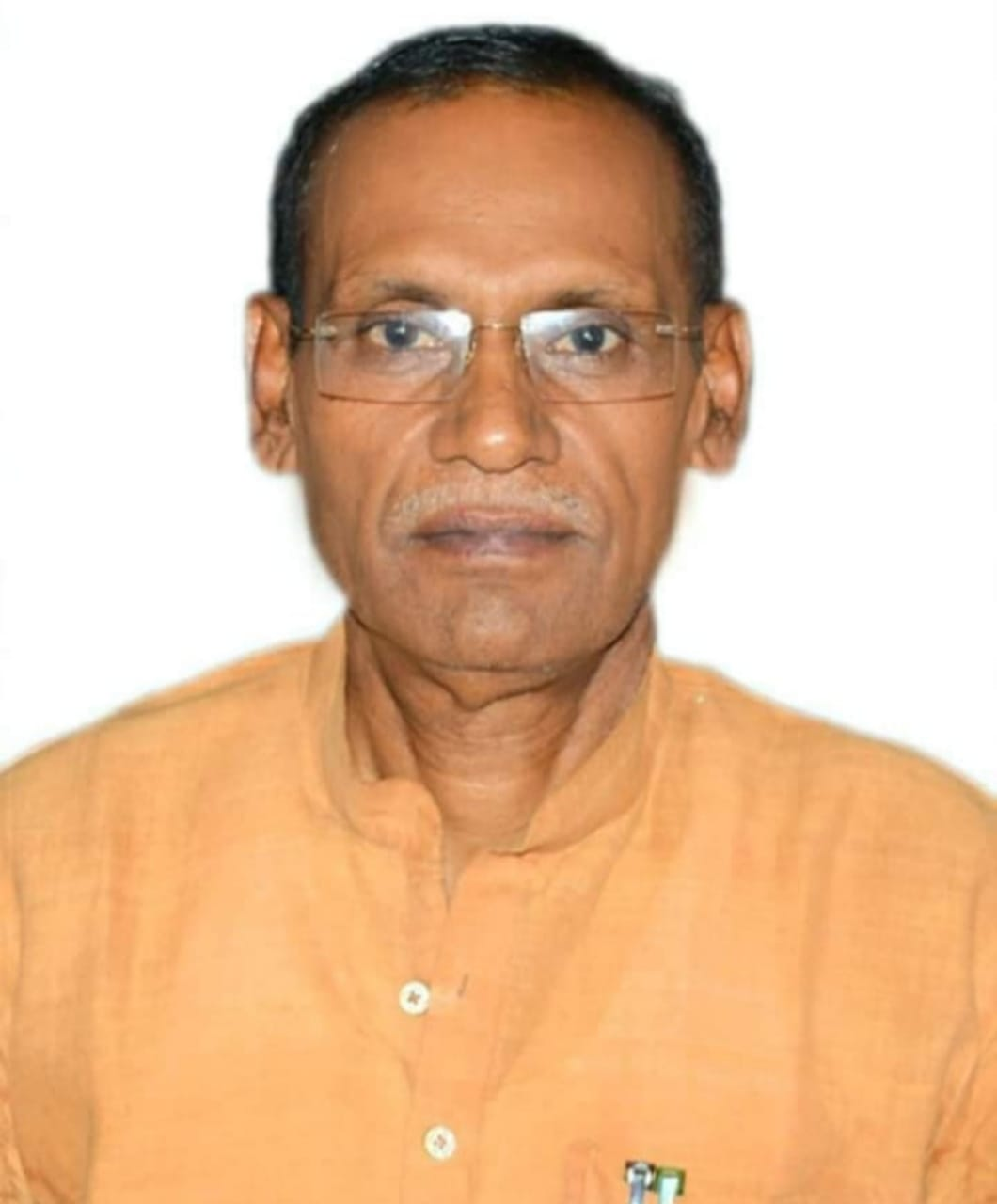

Member of Bihar Legislative Council
- In office 31 May 2019 – 6 May 2020
- Preceded by: Suraj Nandan Kushwaha
- Succeeded by: Samrat Chaudhary
- Constituency: elected by Members of Legislative Assembly

Personal details
- Born: 29 October 1961 (age 64)
- Party: Bharatiya Janata Party
- Children: 2 sons
- Education: B.A.
- Alma mater: Patna University

Radha Mohan Sharma (born 29 October 1961) is an Indian politician belonging to the Bharatiya Janata Party. He is currently serving as vice-president of BJP Bihar unit and was a member of the Bihar Legislative Council for (2019–20).

== Political background ==
Radha Mohan Sharma joined Akhil Bharatiya Vidyarthi Parishad in 1980. and appointed as Jehanabad secretary of Akhil Bharatiya Vidyarthi Parishad in 1981. Later in 1989 He took BJP Membership in-charge Mandal and served as the Jehanabad District President of the Bharatiya Janata Party (BJP) from 2003 to 2006.

In 2005 Radha Mohan Sharma contested Bihar Legislative Assembly as a BJP candidate from Jehanabad constituency. Later He served as BJP Regional in-charge from 2009 to 2013 and from 2014 to 2017 as a State In-charge for Scheduled front, Trible front, Mahadalit front.

In 2017 Radha Mohan Sharma became as General Secretary of Bihar BJP and in 2019 He worked as a BJP Membership in-charge in Bihar State and From 2020 He has been serving as a Vice-president of BJP Bihar.
