= Baleshwar Singh Bharti =

Indian politician

Member of Bihar Legislative Council
- In office 7 May 2000 – 6 May 2012
- Constituency: elected by Members of Legislative Assembly

Personal details
- Born: 8 November 1943 (age 81); Khajauli, Madhubani district
- Political party: Bharatiya Janata Party
- Parent: Girdhari Bharti (father)
- Education: M. A. (History)
- Alma mater: Babasaheb Bhimrao Ambedkar Bihar University

Baleshwar Singh Bharti is an Indian politician from Bharatiya Janata Party. Bihar served as the member of Bihar Legislative Council for 2 terms from 2000 - 2012.

== Political career ==
Bharti had contested Assembly elections in 1980 & 1985 from Babubarhi but lost both the times. In 2000 he was nominated by the BJP to the Bihar Legislative Council. He was renominated again in 2006 by the party after his tenure was expired. In April 2008, Baleshwar Bharti along with Gopal Narayan Singh, Rameshwar Chaurasiya, Nand Kishore Yadav & Nityanand Rai had revolted against the leadership of Sushil Modi & Radha Mohan Singh. In April 2012 he was denied renomination to the Legislative Council. He was a contender for the Jhanjharpur Lok Sabha constituency in 2014 Indian general election but his candidature was not considered after which he expressed his dissatisfaction.
