= Lallan Kumar Saraf =

Indian politician

Lallan Kumar Saraf is an Indian politician. He was elected to the Bihar Legislative Council as nominated member from Janata Dal (United). He is son of former member of the Bihar Legislative Council, Lakhi Prasad Saraf.
