= Sanjeev Shyam Singh =

Indian politician

Member of the Bihar Legislative Council
- In office 1 May 2011 – 30 May 2023
- Constituency: Teachers-Gaya

Personal details
- Party: Jan Suraaj
- Profession: Teacher

Sanjeev Shyam Singh is an Indian politician, currently a member of Jan Suraaj, formerly a member of the Janata Dal (United) and formerly a member of Bihar Legislative Council. He has been raising various issues like air pollution in Bihar cities, raised voice against prohibition and delay in land mutation.
