= Sachchidanand Rai =

Indian Politician

Member of Bihar Legislative Council
- Incumbent
- Assumed office 2022
- Preceded by: Sachchidanand Rai
- Constituency: Saran
- In office 2015–2021
- Succeeded by: Sachchidanand Rai
- Constituency: Saran

Personal details
- Born: 15 July 1963 (age 63) Bihar, India
- Party: Independent
- Education: IIT Kharagpur (Mechanical Engineering)
- Occupation: Politician

Sachchidanand Rai is an Indian politician and a Member of the Bihar Legislative Council from Bihar. Rai has won Member of the Bihar Legislative Council in 2022 as Independent Candidate and in 2015 as Bharatiya Janata Party Candidate.
