= Afaque Ahmad Khan =

Indian politician

Member of Bihar Legislative Council
- Incumbent
- Assumed office 22 July 2022 - Present

Personal details
- Born: 3 February 1966 (age 60) Saran District, Bihar
- Party: Janata Dal (United)
- Parent: Riyaz Ahmad Khan
- Occupation: Businessman

Afaque Ahmad Khan is an Indian politician member of the Bihar Legislative Council. He is a member of the party Janata Dal (United).
