= Santosh Kumar Singh =

Indian Politician

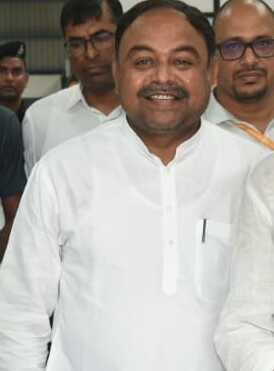

Minister of Labour Resources Government of Bihar
- In office 15 March 2024 – 20 November 2025
- Chief Minister: Nitish Kumar
- Preceded by: Surendra Ram
- Succeeded by: Sanjay Singh Tiger

Member of Bihar Legislative Council
- Incumbent
- Assumed office 8 April 2022
- Preceded by: himself
- Constituency: Rohtas & Kaimur Local Bodies
- In office 17 July 2015 – 16 July 2021
- Preceded by: Krishna Kumar Singh
- Succeeded by: himself
- Constituency: Rohtas & Kaimur Local Bodies

Personal details
- Political party: Bhartiya Janata Party
- Parent: Rameshwar Singh (father)
- Profession: Agriculture

Santosh Kumar Singh is an Indian politician, currently a member of Bharatiya Janata Party and two times Member of Legislative Council from Rohtas.

Recently he inaugurated the Gramin Payjal Yojana in Haudih village of Rohtas district and lauded the Bihar Government for their resolve of village development.
