= Koshi Teachers constituency =

Koshi Teachers constituency is one of 75 Legislative Council seats in Bihar. This constituency covers the teachers from the 14 districts of Bhagalpur, Banka, Munger, Jamui, Lakhisarai, Sheikhpura, Khagaria, Saharsa, Supaul, Madhepura, Purnia, Araria, Kishanganj and Katihar.

== Members of Legislative Council ==
Year	Member	Party
2011	Sanjeev Kumar Singh	Janata Dal
2017	Sanjeev Kumar Singh	Janata Dal
2023	Sanjeev Kumar Singh	Janata Dal

== Term of tenure ==
The members elected have a tenure of 6 years.

== Election ==
The last election was conducted in 2023. The next election is scheduled in April-May 2029.
