= Anil Sharma (Bihar politician) =

Indian politician

Member of Bihar Legislative Council
- Incumbent
- Assumed office 22 July 2022
- Constituency: elected by Members of Legislative Assembly

Personal details
- Born: 6 April 1962 (age 63) Jehanabad, Jehanabad district, Bihar, India
- Party: Bharatiya Janata Party
- Spouse: Renuka Sharma
- Parent: Naresh Prasad Sharma (father)
- Education: B.Sc (Civil Engineering)
- Alma mater: Magadh University
- Profession: Politician

Anil Sharma is an Indian politician from Bharatiya Janata Party, Bihar and a member of Bihar Legislative Council since 2022.

He had been the President of Bharatiya Janata Yuva Morcha, Bihar and had also been the Vice President of Bharatiya Janata Party, Bihar.
