= Sunil Kumar Singh (Bihar politician) =

Indian politician (died 2020)

Member of the Bihar Legislative Council
- Incumbent
- Assumed office 2020
- In office 14 June 2017 – 22 July 2020

Personal details
- Party: Rashtriya Janata Dal
- Parent: Maharana Pratap Singh
- Profession: Social Work and Agriculture

Sunil Kumar Singh was an Indian politician. He was a member of Rashtriya Janata Dal and a Member of the Legislative Council in Bihar Legislative Council.
