= Tunna Pandey =

Indian politician

Member of Legislative Council
- In office 17 July 2015 – 16 July 2021
- Constituency: Local Authorities Siwan

Personal details
- Party: Bharatiya Janata Party

Tunna Pandey was a member of the Bihar Legislative Council from Local Authorities Siwan constituency.

His name is variously spelled as Tun Jee Pandey or Tunjee Pandey in his election affidavits, and as Tunji Pandey on Bihar Legislative Council website.

In July 2016, Tunna was accused of sexually harassing a minor girl in the Purvanchal Express train. He was suspended by his party and issued a show-cause notice to explain his misconduct. A few days later the girl and her father retracted their accusation against Tunna.
