= Virendra Narayan Yadav =

Indian politician

Professor, Doctor Virendra Narayan Yadav
- वीरेंद्र नारायण यादव

Member of the Bihar Legislative Council
- Incumbent
- Assumed office 10 May 2017

Personal details
- Born: 13 March 1955 (age 71) Shivpur, Siwan district, Bihar
- Party: Janata Dal (United)
- Education: Banaras Hindu University
- Occupation: Politician
- Profession: Professor

Virendra Narayan Yadav is an Indian academician and politician related to the Janata Dal (United). He is serving as the member of the Bihar Legislative Council from Saran Graduate constituency since 10 May 2017. His second term started from 9 May 2023.

== Early life and education ==
Virendra Narayan Yadav was born on 13 March 1955 at Shivpur village of Siwan district, Bihar to Lakshmi Narayan. He holds a Masters of Arts degree from Kashi Hindu University, completed in 1975 and a PhD from Kashi Hindu University, completed in 1978.
