= Sheela Pandit =

Indian politician

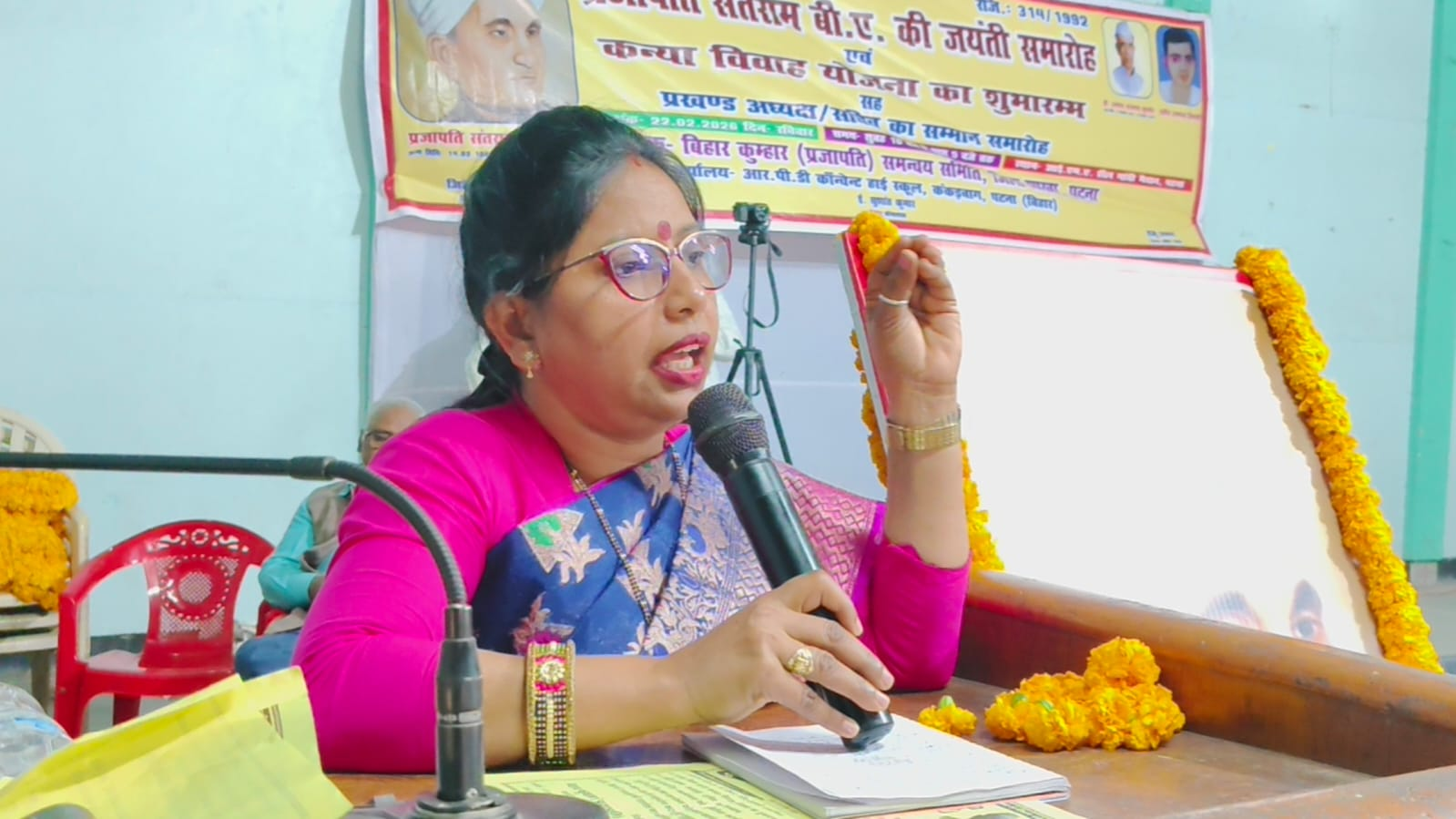

Member of Bihar Legislative Council
- Incumbent
- Assumed office 29 June 2026
- Constituency: Elected by members of Legislative Assembly

Personal details
- Party: BJP
- Education: Mba
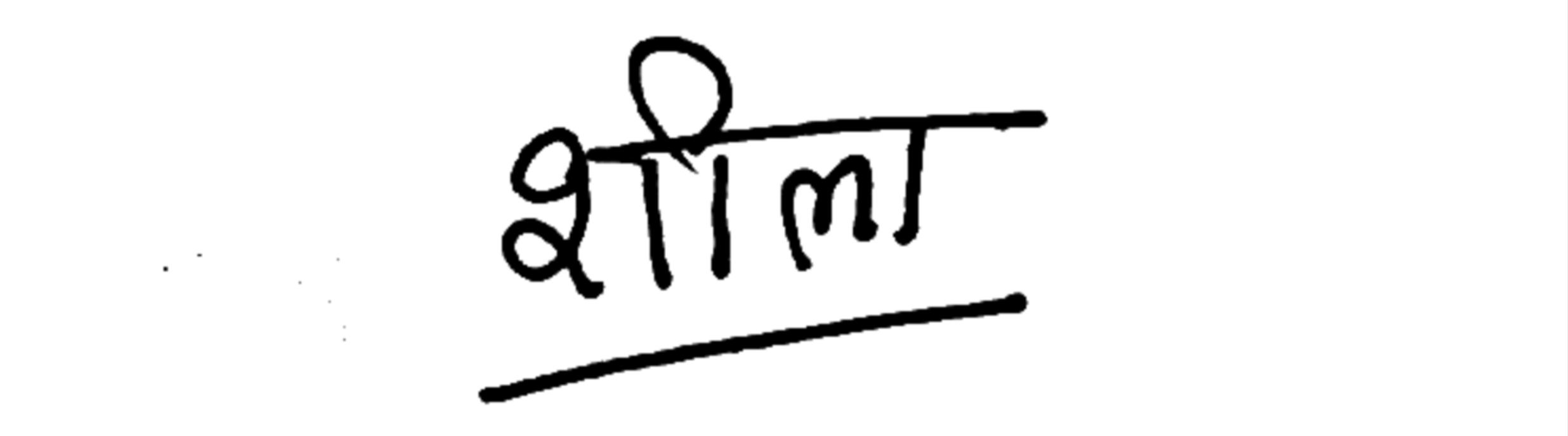
- Signature

Sheela Pandit is an Indian politician from Bharatiya Janata Party. She was elected unopposed to the Bihar Legislative Council on 11 June 2026.

== Political career ==
Sheela Pandit began her political career through local self-government institutions in Bihar. She was elected as a member of the Patna Zila Parishad and later served in the District Board, Patna. She has held various organizational responsibilities within the Bharatiya Janata Party in Bihar, including positions in the BJP Mahila Morcha and the state organization. She also served as an Independent Director of the Indian Railway Finance Corporation (IRFC) from November 2021. In 2026, she was elected as a Member of the Bihar Legislative Council (MLC) as a Bharatiya Janata Party candidate. She currently serves as a member of the Bihar Legislative Council.
