= Nivedita Singh =

Indian politician

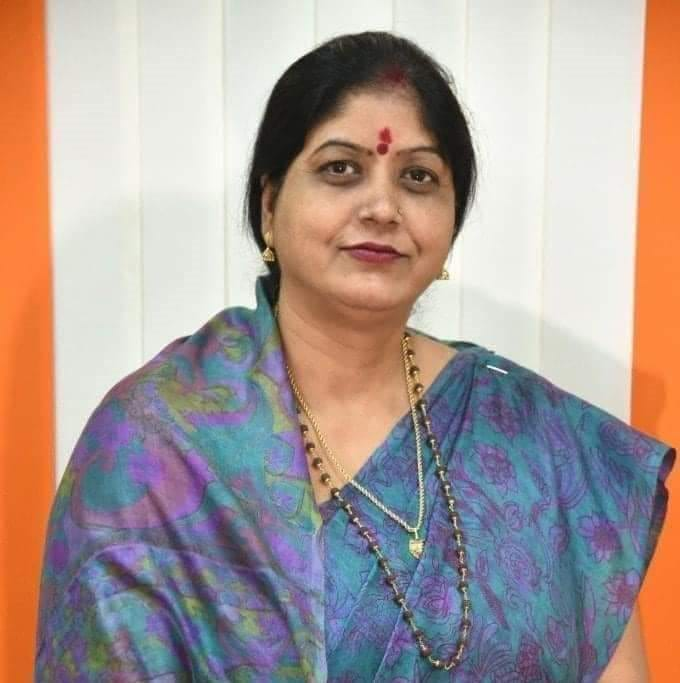

Member of Bihar Legislative Council
- Incumbent
- Assumed office 17 March 2021
- Constituency: Nominated

Personal details
- Born: 14 January 1970 (age 55)
- Political party: Bharatiya Janata Party
- Spouse: Sunil Kumar
- Children: 1 daughter
- Education: MA PHD
- Alma mater: Magadh University MA Veer Kunwar Singh University PHD
- Occupation: Politician

Nivedita Singh (born 14 January 1970 in Patna) is an Indian politician belonging to the Bharatiya Janata Party. She is currently a member of Bihar Legislative Council since March 2021.

== Political background ==
Nivedita Singh joined BJP in 2000 as a primary member from Rohtas and was made District Vice President in BJP Mahila Morcha in 2003. In 2006, she was appointed District Vice President for Rohtas District.
