= Anamika Singh Patel =

Indian politician

Member of Bihar Legislative Council
- Incumbent
- Assumed office 7 May 2024
- Constituency: elected by Legislative Assembly members

Personal details
- Born: 1975 or 1976 (age 49–50) Rasulpur Village, Parasbigha, Jehanabad, Bihar, India
- Party: Bharatiya Janata Party
- Spouse: Praveen Kumar Sinha
- Education: (B.A. program) Barkatullah University

Anamika Singh Patel is an Indian politician who has been serving as a member of the Bihar Legislative Council since 2024. She is a member of the Bharatiya Janata Party.

== Education ==
Patel completed her B.A. at her alma mater Barkatullah University, Bhopal.

== Personal life ==
After completing her education, Patel married Praveen Kumar Sinha.
