= Mohammad Haroon Rashid =

Politician from Bihar, India

Mohammad Haroon Rashid is a Janata Dal (United) politician from Bihar. He is Deputy Chairman of Bihar Legislative Council. He was elected unanimously after post fell vacant after incumbent Deputy Chairman Salim Parvez lost the council election. Rashid was part of 1974 JP Movement.
