= Rajendra Prasad Gupta =

Indian politician

Member of Bihar Legislative Council
- Incumbent
- Assumed office 17 March 2021
- Constituency: Nominated
- In office 11 May 2006 – 10 May 2012
- Constituency: Nominated

Personal details
- Born: 9 August 1959 (age 67) Forbesganj, Araria district, Bihar
- Party: Bharatiya Janata Party
- Parent: Harikrishna Prasad (father)
- Education: M.Com, MBA, PhD
- Alma mater: Patna University
- Profession: Professor, Politician

Rajendra Prasad Gupta is an Indian politician and current member of the Bihar Legislative Council from the Bharatiya Janata Party. He was first nominated as a member of the Bihar Legislative Council on 11 May 2006. He had been re-nominated as a member starting 17 March 2021.
