= Lal Mohan Gupta =

Indian politician

Member of Bihar Legislative Council
- Incumbent
- Assumed office 7 May 2024
- Constituency: elected by Legislative Assembly members

Personal details
- Born: 5 January 1963 (age 63) Munger, Bihar, India
- Party: Bharatiya Janata Party
- Education: Bhagalpur University B.A., LLB; BSEB (Matric.)

Lal Mohan Gupta (born 5 January 1963) is an Indian politician, currently serving as a member of the Bihar Legislative Council since 2024. He is a member of the Bharatiya Janata Party.

== Early life ==
Lal Mohan Gupta was born to Ram Prasad on 5 January 1963 in Munger, Bihar. He has a bachelor's degree in law.

== Education ==
During his early years, Gupta studied under BSEB curriculum. After his matriculation exams in 1978, he studied law at Bhagalpur University and graduated from the same university with a Bachelor of Laws degree in 1992.

== See also ==
- Mangal Pandey
- Bihar Legislative Council
- Government of Bihar
