= Dilip Kumar Singh =

Indian politician

Member of the Bihar Legislative Council
- Incumbent
- Assumed office 8 April 2022
- Preceded by: Rajan Singh
- Constituency: Aurangabad Local Authorities

Personal details
- Born: 25 April 1964 (age 62)
- Party: Bhartiya Janata Party
- Parent: Rajdev Singh
- Profession: Agriculture and Business

Dilip Kumar Singh is an Indian politician, currently a member of Bharatiya Janata Party and a Member of Legislative Council from Aurangabad, Bihar.
