= Sanjay Mayukh =

Indian politician

National Media Co-Incharge Bharatiya Janata Party
- Incumbent
- Assumed office 26 September 2020
- President: Jagat Prakash Nadda
- Media In-charge: Anil Baluni

Member of Bihar Legislative Council
- Incumbent
- Assumed office 29 June 2020
- Constituency: Elected by members of Legislative Assembly
- In office 7 May 2014 – 6 May 2020
- Constituency: Elected by members of Legislative Assembly

Personal details
- Born: 1 January 1974 (age 52)
- Party: Bharatiya Janata Party
- Education: Patna University (PhD, M.A., P.G Diploma Rural Management); Magadh University (BA)

Sanjay Mayukh is an Indian politician from Bharatiya Janata Party. Mayukh was elected unopposed to the Bihar Legislative Council on 29 June 2020. He is also the Bharatiya Janata Party National Spokesperson and Media Co-head in charge along with Anil Baluni.
