= Ashok Kumar Agrawal =

Indian politician

Member of Bihar Legislative Council
- Incumbent
- Assumed office 8 April 2022
- Preceded by: himself
- Constituency: Katihar Local Authorities
- In office 17 July 2009 – 16 July 2021
- Preceded by: Mohan Lal Agrawal
- Succeeded by: himself
- Constituency: Katihar Local Authorities

Personal details
- Born: 8 October 1962 (age 62); Katihar, Bihar
- Political party: Bharatiya Janata Party
- Children: 2 sons
- Parent: Sanwarmal Agrawal (father)

Ashok Kumar Agrawal is an Indian politician from Bihar belonging to the Bharatiya Janata Party. He is a member of the Bihar Legislative Council since 2009 representing Katihar Local Authorities constituency. He was an aspirant for Katihar Lok Sabha constituency in 2019 election and had even filed nomination as Independent candidate. However he later withdrew his nomination.
