= Ram Chandra Purve =

Indian politician

Vice Chairman Bihar Vidhan Parishad
- In office 26 August 2022 – 24 July 2024
- Preceded by: Maheshwar Hazari
- Succeeded by: Ram Bachan Rai

Member of the Bihar Legislative Council
- In office 7 May 2018 – 6 May 2024

Personal details
- Political party: Rashtriya Janata Dal

Ram Chandra Purve is a member of the Bihar Legislative Council. In the elections on March 23, 11 candidates were elected unopposed. Shri Purve is former state president of Rashtriya Janata Dal Bihar.
