= Anil Thakur =

Indian Politician

Member of Bihar Legislative Council
- Incumbent
- Assumed office 11 June 2026
- Constituency: elected by MLA's

Personal details
- Party: Bharatiya Janata Party

Anil Thakur is an Indian politician from Bharatiya Janata Party. He was elected unopposed to the Bihar Legislative Council on 11 June 2026.
