= Khalid Anwar =

Indian politician

Member of the Bihar Legislative Council
- Incumbent
- Assumed office 7 May 2018

Personal details
- Political party: Janata Dal (United)
- Parent: Shaikh Barkatullah

Khalid Anwar is an Indian politician who is serving as a Member of the Bihar Legislative Council since 23 June 2018 representing the Janata Dal (United) when 11 candidates were elected unopposed.
