= Rashtriya Janata Dal =

Political party in India

- Abbreviation: RJD
- President: Lalu Prasad Yadav (as president); Tejashwi Yadav (as working president)
- Rajya Sabha Leader: Prem Chand Gupta
- Lok Sabha Leader: Abhay Kushwaha
- Founder: Lalu Prasad Yadav; Raghuvansh Prasad Singh; Jagada Nand Singh; Tulsidas Mehta; Abdul Bari Siddiqui; Mohammad Shahabuddin; Mohammed Taslimuddin; Mohammad Ali Ashraf Fatmi
- Founded: 5 July 1997 (29 years ago)
- Split from: Janata Dal
- Headquarters: 13, V. P. House, Rafi Marg, New Delhi, India-110001
- Student wing: Yuva RJD
- Youth wing: Yuva RJD
- Women's wing: Mahila RJD
- Ideology: Democratic socialism; Left-wing populism
- Political position: Centre-left to left-wing
- Colours: Green
- Slogan: Samaj Ka Bal, Rashtriya Janata Dal; Bihar Ka Vishwas, Lalten Ka Prakash
- ECI status: State party in Bihar
- Alliance: National Alliance: INDIA (since 2023); Regional Alliances: MGB (Bihar) (since 2015); MGB (Jharkhand) (since 2018); LDF (Kerala) (since 2023); Former Alliances: UPA (2004–2009), (2014–2023) (till dissolved)) (National); RJD-LJP Alliance (2009–2014); Congress Alliance (1999–2004); Fourth Front (2009); Left Front (West Bengal) (2006–2011); Mahajot (West Bengal) (2016); Mahajot (Assam) (Assam) (2016–2021); AIUDF-led Alliance (Assam) (2016)
- Seats in Rajya Sabha: 5 / 245
- Seats in Lok Sabha: 4 / 543
- Seats in Bihar Legislative Council: 16 / 75
- Seats in State Legislative Assemblies: List 25 / 243 (Bihar) 4 / 81 (Jharkhand) 1 / 140 (Kerala)
- Number of states and union territories in government: 1 / 31

Election symbol
- Lantern

Party flag

Website
- rjd.co.in

The Rashtriya Janata Dal (RJD, lit. 'National People's Party') is an Indian political party, mainly based in the Indian state of Bihar. The party was founded in 1997 by Lalu Prasad Yadav. The party's support base has traditionally been Other Backward Classes, Dalits and Muslims and it is considered a political champion of the lower castes.

In 2008, RJD received the status of recognized national level party following its performance in north-eastern states. RJD was derecognised as a national party on 30 July 2010. Leading the Mahagathbandhan alliance with 35 MLAs, it is currently the official opposition in Bihar. RJD is part of Ruling Government in Jharkhand with its allies in Mahagathbandhan (Jharkhand).

== History (1997-2015) ==
=== Formation ===
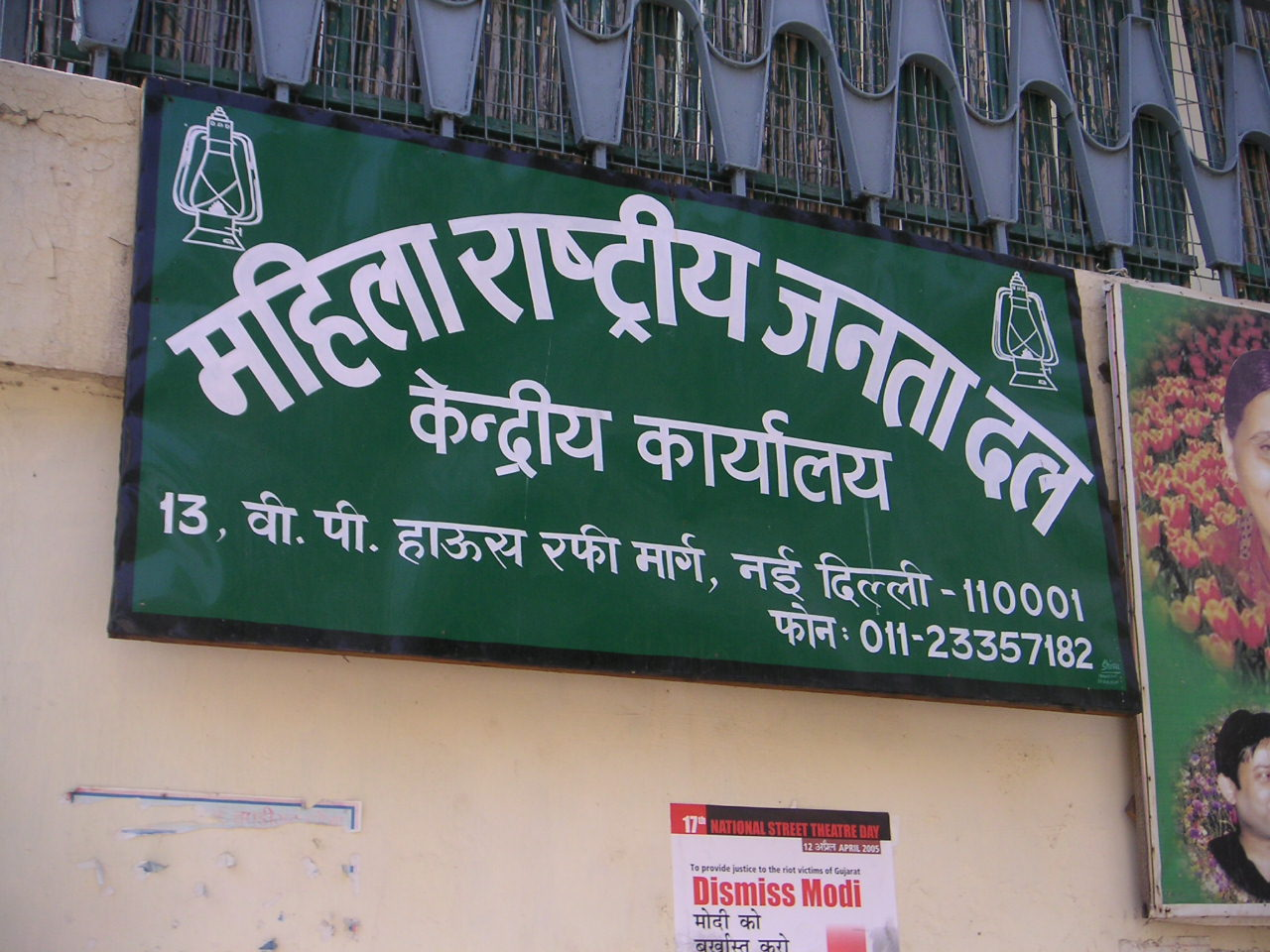
RJD Women's wing office in Delhi

There was pressure on Lalu Prasad Yadav to resign from Chief minister post within and outside of Janata Dal following being chargesheeted in the Fodder scam. On 5 July 1997, Pappu Yadav, Raghuvansh Prasad Singh, Mohammad Shahabuddin, Abdul Bari Siddiqui, Kanti Singh, Mohammed Taslimuddin and Md Ali Ashraf Fatmi along with seventeen Lok Sabha MPs and eight Rajya Sabha MPs along with supporters gathered at New Delhi formed the new political party, Rashtriya Janata Dal. It was formed as breakaway of Janata Dal. Lalu Prasad was elected as the first president of RJD. It is a centre-left party.

With demands for his resignation continuing to mount, on 25 July, Lalu resigned from his position, but was able to install his wife, Rabri Devi as the new chief minister on the same day.

In the March 1998 national elections, RJD won 17 Lok Sabha seats from Bihar but failed to make significant headway in any other state. Later that year, the party formed an alliance with Mulayam Singh Yadav's Samajwadi Party as an anti-Bharatiya Janata Party secular coalition but the coalition failed in garnering any widespread support, and the party won only 7 seats in 1999 national elections.

=== In UPA ===
In the October 1999 elections, RJD fought the election in alliance with Indian National Congress but lost 10 Lok Sabha seats including the seat of Lalu Prasad Yadav.

In the 2000 Bihar election, however, it performed well, winning most of the seats in the state assembly. It gained majority by forming post poll alliance with Congress and agreeing for bifurcation of the state. Continuing its upswing in electoral fortunes, the party won 24 Lok Sabha seats in the 2004 elections that it fought in alliance with Indian National Congress. It was a part of Indian National Congress led United Progressive Alliance (UPA) from 2004 - May 2009, wherein Lalu Yadav held the position of the Minister of Railways.

In February 2005 Bihar Legislative Assembly election RJD won only 75 seats and lost the power. In the state elections held later that year – as a result of no party being able to form a government and RJD continued its downward slide winning only 54 seats.

In 2009 Indian general election, the RJD broke its alliance from UPA when seat sharing talks failed. RJD formed its alliance with Ram Vilas Paswan's Lok Janshakti Party and Mulayam Singh Yadav's Samajwadi Party what the media has dubbed the "Fourth Front". RJD performed poorly and won just four seats, all of them in Bihar. However, in 2010 Assembly election, the RJD did not continue their alliance with Samajwadi Party.

In the 2014 Indian general election, RJD came back to UPA and contested election in alliance with Indian National Congress and Nationalist Congress Party in Bihar. Out of 40 seats in Bihar, RJD will contest on 27 seats, INC on 12 and NCP on one. RJD won only four out of total forty Loksabha seats in Bihar.

== Organisation ==
The party leadership consists of the following bodies.

=== National President ===
Lalu Prasad Yadav is the National President of RJD.

=== National Vice President ===
The national vice president members of the party Mangani Lal Mandal, Mohammad Ilyas Hussain, Ahmed Ashfaq Karim, Rabri Devi, Raghuvansh Prasad Singh, Shivanand Tiwary and Mehboob Ali Kaiser

National Secretary general: Abdul Bari Siddiqui.

National Treasurer: Sunil Kumar Singh

=== National Executive Committee ===
The national executive members of the party Lalu Prasad Yadav, Tejashwi Yadav, Tej Pratap Yadav, Misa Bharti, Prem Chandra Gupta, Manoj Jha, Abdul Bari Siddiqui and Ram Chandra Purve.

== The Mahagathbandhan (Grand Alliance) in Bihar ==
On 7 May 2015, the RJD expelled Pappu Yadav for six years due to anti-RJD activities after speculation rose that he may join the Biju Janata Dal for the 2015 Bihar Legislative Assembly election but he formed a new party called Jan Adhikar Party.

In November 2015, RJD won the elections as party became the single largest party with 80 followed by Janata Dal (United) with 71 seats, BJP with 53 seats and Congress with 27 seats. In terms of vote share, BJP came first with 24.4%, followed by RJD with 18.4% and JD (U) with 16.8% and Congress got 6.7%. Janata Dal (United)'s Nitish Kumar became the Chief Minister and Lalu's son Tejashwi Yadav became the Deputy Chief Minister of Bihar.

In July 2017, following the corruption cases against Tejashwi Yadav, Nitish Kumar asked Yadav to resign from the cabinet, which was refused by RJD. In order to protect his clean image towards corruption, Nitish Kumar resigned on 26 July 2017, ending RJD's stake in Bihar government. What followed next was a coalition BJP and JDU as a result Nitish Kumar became the Chief Minister again whereas Sushil Modi, a prominent BJP leader became the Deputy Chief Minister.

Alliance between Indian National Congress and the RJD factioned in October 2021, when Tejashwi Yadav gave tickets to candidates in Bihar By-elections, where Congress was fixed to stand candidates.

In August 2022, the Mahagathbandhan, Janata Dal (United), Indian National Congress, Hindustan Awam Morcha and Left Front joined again to form 2/3rd Majority government in Bihar Legislative Assembly.

In January 2024, Nitish Kumar left the Mahagathbandhan once again and joined hands with the BJP. He later became the chief minister once again.

In 2025 Bihar Legislative Assembly election, RJD won just 25 seats and it slipped to third largest party. Its allies won 10 seats.

== Controversies and criticism ==
Mohammad Shahabuddin, a leader of RJD, has been involved in several criminal cases. Shahabuddin has been accused of several murders, be it of political rivals, or police officers. Shahabuddin, through his lawyers, attempted to also intimidate the legal proceedings, which led to more criminal cases against him.

During Lalu Prasad Yadav's tenure as Chief Minister, Bihar's law and order was at lowest, kidnapping was on rise and private armies mushroomed. He was also criticized by opposition in the Shilpi-Gautam Murder case and the death of his daughter Ragini Yadav's friend, Abhishek Mishra, in mysterious circumstances.

An investigation into the land-for-jobs scam has implicated Lalu Prasad, along with both of his sons, as well as his wife Rabri Devi and his daughter, in addition to their involvement in other corruption scandals. Tejashwi Yadav allegedly threatened Central Bureau of Investigation agents who were investigating him in another corruption case.

== Electoral performance ==
=== Lok Sabha elections ===
Lok Sabha Term	Indian General election	Seats contested	Seats won	Votes Polled	% of votes	State (seats)	Ref.
12th Lok Sabha	1998	37	17 / 543	1,02,29,971	2.68	Bihar (7)	
13th Lok Sabha	1999	61	7 / 543	10,150,492	2.79	Bihar (7)	
14th Lok Sabha	2004	42	24 / 543	9,384,147	2.4	Bihar (22) Jharkhand (2)	
15th Lok Sabha	2009	44	4 / 543	5,280,084	1.3	Bihar (4)	
16th Lok Sabha	2014	30	4 / 543	7,442,313	1.4	Bihar (4)	
17th Lok Sabha	2019	21	0 / 543	6,631,585	1.1	N/A	
18th Lok Sabha	2024	23	4 / 543	10,107,402	1.57	Bihar (4)	

=== Bihar Vidhan Sabha elections ===
Vidhan Sabha Term	Assembly Elections	Seats Contested	Seats Won	% of votes	% of votes in seats contested	Party Votes	Ref
12th Vidhan Sabha	2000	293	124 / 324	28.34	31.28	10,500,361	
13th Vidhan Sabha	2005 February	210	71 / 243	25.07	28.35	6,140,223	
14th Vidhan Sabha	2005 October	175	54 / 243	23.45	32.63	5,525,081	
15th Vidhan Sabha	2010	168	22 / 243	18.84	27.31	5,475,656	
16th Vidhan Sabha	2015	101	80 / 243	18.4	44.35	6,995,509	
17th Vidhan Sabha	2020	144	75 / 243	23.11	38.96	9,738,855	
18th Vidhan Sabha	2025	143	25 / 243	23.00		11,546,055	

=== Jharkhand Vidhan Sabha elections ===
Vidhan Sabha Term	Jharkhand Assembly Elections	Seats Contested	Seats Won	% of votes	Party Votes	Ref
2nd Vidhan Sabha	2005	51	7 / 81	8.48		
3rd Vidhan Sabha	2009	56	5 / 81	5.03	517,324	
4th Vidhan Sabha	2014	19	0 / 81	3.13	133,815	
5th Vidhan Sabha	2019	7	1 / 81	2.75	413,167	
6th Vidhan Sabha	2024	7	4 / 81	3.44	613,880	

=== Kerala Vidhan Sabha elections ===
Vidhan Sabha Term	Kerala Assembly Elections	Seats Contested	Seats Won	% of votes	Party Votes	Ref
16th Vidhan Sabha	2026	3	1 / 140	0.82	178,051	

== List of chief ministers ==
=== Chief ministers ===
No.	Name	Term in office			Party	Assembly (Election)
3	Rabri Devi	25 July 1997	11 February 1999	1 year, 201 days	Rashtriya Janata Dal	Eleventh Assembly
2	Rabri Devi	9 March 1999	2 March 2000	359 days	Rashtriya Janata Dal	Eleventh Assembly
3	Rabri Devi	11 March 2000	6 March 2005	4 years, 360 days	Rashtriya Janata Dal	Twelfth Assembly

=== Deputy chief ministers ===
No.	Name	Term in office			Assembly (Election)
1.	Tejashwi Yadav	26 November 2015	26 July 2017	1 year, 244 days	17th Bihar Assembly
2.	Tejashwi Yadav	10 August 2022	28 January 2024	1 year, 171 days	18th Bihar Assembly

== List of central ministers ==
No.	Photo	Portfolio	Name (Birth–Death)	Assumed office	Left office	Duration	Constituency (House)	Prime Minister	
1		Minister of Railways	Lalu Prasad Yadav (born 1948)	23 May 2004	22 May 2009	4 years, 364 days	Chapra (Lok Sabha)	Prime Minister	Manmohan Singh
2		Minister of Company Affairs [MoS(I/C)]	Prem Chand Gupta (born 1950)	23 May 2004	29 Jan 2006	1 year, 251 days	Bihar (Rajya Sabha)		Manmohan Singh
2		Minister of Company Affairs	Prem Chand Gupta (born 1950)	29 Jan 2006	9 May 2007	1 year, 100 days	Bihar (Rajya Sabha)		Manmohan Singh
2		Minister of Corporate Affairs	Prem Chand Gupta (born 1950)	9 May 2007	22 May 2009	2 years, 13 days	Bihar (Rajya Sabha)		Manmohan Singh
3		Minister of Rural Development	Raghuvansh Prasad Singh (1946–2020)	23 May 2004	22 May 2009	4 years, 364 days	Vaishali (Lok Sabha)		Manmohan Singh
4		Minister of Agriculture (MoS)	Akhilesh Prasad Singh (born 1962)	23 May 2004	22 May 2009	4 years, 364 days	Motihari (Lok Sabha)		Manmohan Singh
4		Minister of Food and Civil Supplies, Consumer Affairs & Public Distribution (MoS)	Akhilesh Prasad Singh (born 1962)	23 May 2004	22 May 2009	4 years, 364 days	Motihari (Lok Sabha)		Manmohan Singh
5		Minister of Water Resources (MoS)	Jay Prakash Narayan Yadav (born 1954)	23 May 2004	6 Nov 2005	1 year, 167 days	Monghyr (Lok Sabha)		Manmohan Singh
5		Minister of Water Resources (MoS)	Jay Prakash Narayan Yadav (born 1954)	24 Oct 2006	22 May 2009	2 years, 210 days	Monghyr (Lok Sabha)		Manmohan Singh
6		Minister of Heavy Industries & Public Enterprises (MoS)	Kanti Singh (born 1957)	29 Jan 2006	6 Apr 2008	2 years, 68 days	Arrah (Lok Sabha)		Manmohan Singh
6		Minister of Human Resource Development (MoS)	Kanti Singh (born 1957)	23 May 2004	29 Jan 2006	1 year, 251 days	Arrah (Lok Sabha)		Manmohan Singh
6		Minister of Tourism (MoS)	Kanti Singh (born 1957)	6 Apr 2008	22 May 2009	1 year, 46 days	Arrah (Lok Sabha)		Manmohan Singh
6		Minister of Culture (MoS)	Kanti Singh (born 1957)	6 Apr 2008	22 May 2009	1 year, 46 days	Arrah (Lok Sabha)		Manmohan Singh
7		Minister of Human Resource Development (MoS)	Mohammad Ali Ashraf Fatmi (born 1956)	23 May 2004	22 May 2009	4 years, 364 days	Darbhanga (Lok Sabha)		Manmohan Singh
8		Minister of Heavy Industries & Public Enterprises (MoS)	Mohammed Taslimuddin (1943–2017)	23 May 2004	25 May 2004	2 days	Kishanganj (Lok Sabha)		Manmohan Singh
8		Minister of Agriculture (MoS)	Mohammed Taslimuddin (1943–2017)	25 May 2004	22 May 2009	4 years, 362 days	Kishanganj (Lok Sabha)		Manmohan Singh
8		Minister of Food and Civil Supplies, Consumer Affairs & Public Distribution (MoS)	Mohammed Taslimuddin (1943–2017)	25 May 2004	22 May 2009	4 years, 362 days	Kishanganj (Lok Sabha)		Manmohan Singh

== Prominent members ==
=== Present members ===
- Md Ali Ashraf Fatmi, close aide of Lalu Prasad Yadav, RJD Co-founder and ex- Union Minister for Human Resource Development, Four time member of parliament.
- Abdul Bari Siddiqui, close associate of Lalu Prasad Yadav former Leader of Leader of Opposition following the 2010 Bihar Legislative Assembly election until the split between JD(U) and BJP and former Finance Minister Govt. of Bihar. Former Bihar RJD President.
- Alok Kumar Mehta, National General Secretary of Rashtriya Janata Dal.
- Prem Kumar Mani, Vice President and Strategist of RJD.
- Jagada Nand Singh, Former State President of RJD for Bihar.
- Shivchandra Ram, former Member of legislative Assembly.
- Ram Chandra Purve is a Former member of the Bihar Legislative Council. Former state president of RJD.
- Jay Prakash Narayan Yadav General Secretary, RJD. Former Cabinet Minister Bihar Govt. Former Union Minister, MP.
- Sarfaraz Alam Former Minister Bihar Govt. Former MP Araria.
- Manoj Jha MP Rajya Sabha and National Spokesperson of RJD.
- Prem Chand Gupta MP Rajya Sabha and former cabinet minister in Ministry of Company Affairs of India in First Manmohan Singh ministry.
- Ahmad Ashfaque Karim Former MP Rajya Sabha.
- Surendra Prasad Yadav senior RJD leader and Member of Bihar Legislative Assembly from Belaganj.Chairman of the Public Accounts Committee.
- K. P. Mohanan, Party head Kerala Legislative Assembly.

=== Late members ===
- Raghuvansh Prasad Singh, close aide of Lalu Prasad Yadav, RJD Co-founder and Union Minister for Rural Development.
- Raghunath Jha, close aide of Lalu Prasad Yadav, RJD Co-founder and Union Minister. Responsible for start of Lalu Raj in Bihar.
- Mohammad Shahabuddin He was a former Member of Parliament from the Siwan constituency in the state of Bihar, former National Vice President and a former member of the National Executive Committee of the RJD, close associate of Lalu Prasad Yadav.

== List of State Presidents of Bihar ==
No.	Name	Term Start	Term End
1.	Abdul Bari Siddiqui	1997	2010
2.	Ram Chandra Purve	2010	2019
3.	Jagada Nand Singh	2019	2025
4.	Mangani Lal Mandal	2025	Incumbent

== See also ==
- Tejashwi Yadav
- Lalu Prasad Yadav
- List of political parties in India
