= Bihar Legislative Council =

Upper house of the bicameral legislature of the Indian state of Bihar

Bihar Legislative Council Bihar Vidhan Parishad

Type
- Type: Upper house of the Bihar Legislature
- Term limits: 6 years

History
- Founded: 16 February 1950 (76 years ago)

Leadership
- Governor: Syed Ata Hasnain since 14 March 2026
- Chairman: Vacant since 28 September 2026
- Deputy Chairperson: Prof. Ram Bachan Rai, JD(U) since 24 July 2024
- Leader of the House (Chief Minister): Samrat Choudhary, BJP since 30 March 2026
- Deputy Leader of the House: Rajendra Prasad Gupta, BJP; Lallan Kumar Saraf, JD(U) since 15 May 2026
- Leader of the Opposition: Rabri Devi, RJD since 16 February 2024

Structure
- Seats: 75 (63 elected + 12 nominated)
- Political groups: Government (50) NDA (50): BJP (27); JD(U) (20); LJP(RV) (1); HAM(S) (1); RLM (1); Official Opposition (19) MGB (19): RJD (17); INC (1); CPI(ML)L (1); Others (6): IND (4); JSP (1); RLJP (1)

Elections
- Voting system: Single transferable vote

Meeting place
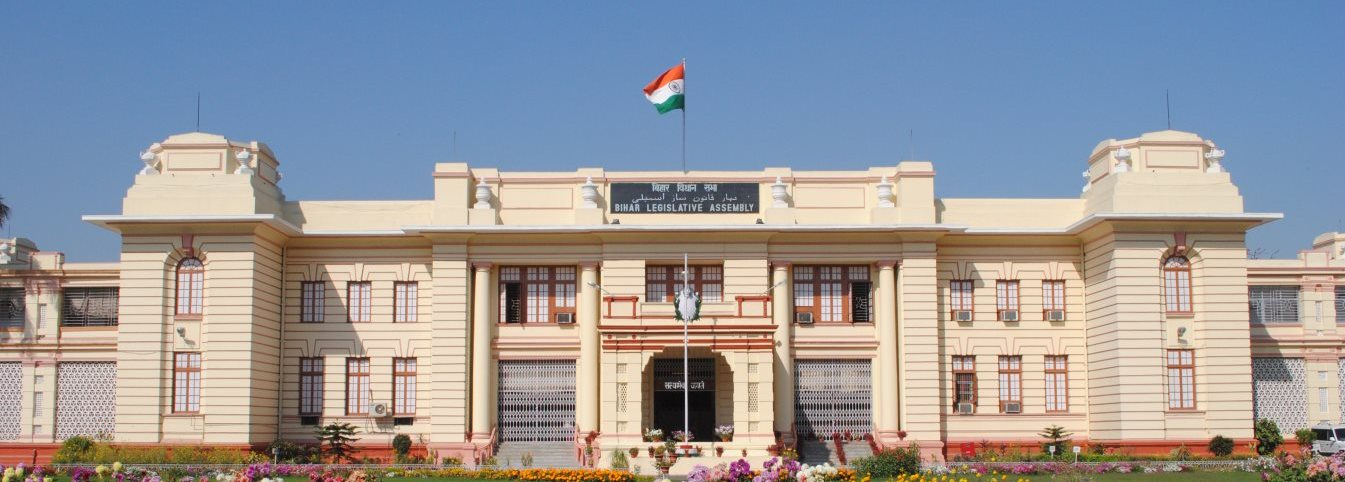
- Bihar Legislative Council, Patna, Bihar, India

Website
- Bihar Legislative Council

Bihar Legislative Council, also known as the Bihar Vidhan Parishad, is the upper house of the bicameral Bihar Legislature in the state of Bihar, India.

== History ==
A new Province of Bihar and Odisha was created by the Government of India on 12 December 1911. The Legislative Council with a total of 43 members belonging to different categories was formed in 1912. The first sitting of the Council was convened on 20 January 1913 at Patna College Bankipore. In 1920 Bihar and Orissa declared governor province, as per Government of India Act 1919. As per Government of India Act 1935 Bihar and Orissa was split into separate provinces of Bihar and Orissa. In 1936, [Bihar] attained its separate Statehood. Under the Government of India Act, 1919, the unicameral legislature got converted into bicameral one, i.e., the Bihar Legislative Council and the Bihar Legislative Assembly. Under the Government of India Act, 1935, the Bihar Legislative Council consisted of 29 members. On March 21, 1938, the session of the Bihar Legislative Council took place in a newly built building. On 1 April 1950, the secretariat of BLC started functioning. After the first General Elections 1952, the number of members was increased up to 72 and by 1958 the number was raised to 96. With the creation of Jharkhand, as a result of the Bihar Reorganisation Act, 2000 passed by the Parliament, the strength of the Bihar Legislative Council has been reduced from 96 to 75 members. Some veteran council members B. P. Mandal, Jagannath Mishra, Satyendra Narain Singh and Lalu Prasad Yadav have also served as Chief Minister of Bihar.

== Working ==
Bihar Legislative Council is a permanent body and not subject to dissolution. But as nearly as possible, one-third of the members thereof retire as soon as may be on the expiration of every second year. Members are now elected or nominated for six years and one-third of them retire every second year. The presiding officers of Vidhan Parishad are now known as Chairman and Deputy Chairman. Members of the upper house, the Legislative Council are indirectly elected through an electoral college. There are 27 Committees which are, at present, functional in the Council. Besides, there are three Financial Committees consisting of the members of the two Houses of the State Legislature.

== Current members ==
- Chairperson: Vacant
- Deputy Chairperson: Ram Bachchan Rai
- Leader of the House: Samrat Chaudhary
- Deputy Leader of the House: Rajendra Prasad Gupta, Lallan Kumar Saraf
- Government Chief Whip: Sanjay Kumar Singh
- Government Deputy Chief Whip: Janak Ram
- Leader of the Opposition: Rabri Devi

=== Elected by Legislative Assembly (27) ===
Keys: BJP (9) JD(U) (7) HAM(S) (1) LJP(RV) (1) RJD (8) CPI(ML)L (1)

#	Member	Party	Alliance	Term start	Term end
1	Pawan Singh	BJP	NDA	29-Jun-2026	28-Jun-2032
2	Sanjay Mayukh	BJP	NDA	29-Jun-2026	28-Jun-2032
3	Anil Thakur	BJP	NDA	29-Jun-2026	28-Jun-2032
4	Sheela Pandit	BJP	NDA	29-Jun-2026	28-Jun-2032
5	Surya Kumar Sharma	BJP	NDA	04-May-2026	06-May-2030
6	Anamika Singh Patel	BJP	NDA	07-May-2024	06-May-2030
7	Lal Mohan Gupta	BJP	NDA	07-May-2024	06-May-2030
8	Hari Sahni	BJP	NDA	22-Jul-2022	21-Jul-2028
9	Anil Sharma	BJP	NDA	22-Jul-2022	21-Jul-2028
10	Nishant Kumar	JD(U)	NDA	29-Jun-2026	28-Jun-2032
11	Bharti Mehta	JD(U)	NDA	29-Jun-2026	28-Jun-2032
12	Shivrani Devi Prajapati	JD(U)	NDA	29-Jun-2026	28-Jun-2032
13	Lalan Prasad	JD(U)	NDA	09-April-2026	06-May-2030
14	Khalid Anwar	JD(U)	NDA	07-May-2024	06-May-2030
15	Rabindra Prasad Singh	JD(U)	NDA	22-Jul-2022	21-Jul-2028
16	Afaque Ahmad Khan	JD(U)	NDA	22-Jul-2022	21-Jul-2028
17	Santosh Kumar Suman	HAM(S)	NDA	07-May-2024	06-May-2030
18	Ashraf Ansari	LJP(RV)	NDA	29-Jun-2026	28-Jun-2032
19	Sunil Singh	RJD	MGB	29-Jun-2026	28-Jun-2032
20	Rabri Devi	RJD	MGB	07-May-2024	06-May-2030
21	Abdul Bari Siddiqui	RJD	MGB	07-May-2024	06-May-2030
22	Syed Faisal Ali	RJD	MGB	07-May-2024	06-May-2030
23	Urmila Thakur	RJD	MGB	07-May-2024	06-May-2030
24	Munni Rajak	RJD	MGB	22-Jul-2022	21-Jul-2028
25	Ashok Pandey	RJD	MGB	22-Jul-2022	21-Jul-2028
26	Mohammad Qari Sohaib	RJD	MGB	22-Jul-2022	21-Jul-2028
27	Shashi Yadav	CPI(ML)L	MGB	07-May-2024	06-May-2030

=== Elected from Local Authorities Constituencies (24) ===
Keys: BJP (7) JD(U) (4) RJD (7) INC (1) IND (4) RLJP (1)

#	Constituency	Member	Party	Alliance	Term start	Term end
1	Rohtas-Kaimur	Santosh Singh	BJP	NDA	08-Apr-2022	07-Apr-2028
2	Aurangabad	Dilip Singh	BJP	NDA	08-Apr-2022	07-Apr-2028
3	Darbhanga	Sunil Chaudhary	BJP	NDA	08-Apr-2022	07-Apr-2028
4	Samastipur	Tarun Kumar	BJP	NDA	08-Apr-2022	07-Apr-2028
5	Purnia-Araria-Kishanganj	Dilip Jaiswal	BJP	NDA	08-Apr-2022	07-Apr-2028
6	Katihar	Ashok Agrawal	BJP	NDA	08-Apr-2022	07-Apr-2028
7	Gopalganj	Rajeev Singh	BJP	NDA	08-Apr-2022	07-Apr-2028
8	Muzaffarpur	Dinesh Prasad Singh	JD(U)	NDA	08-Apr-2022	07-Apr-2028
9	Nalanda	Reena Yadav	JD(U)	NDA	08-Apr-2022	07-Apr-2028
10	Sitamarhi-Sheohar	Rekha Devi	JD(U)	NDA	08-Apr-2022	07-Apr-2028
11	Bhagalpur-Banka	Vijay Singh	JD(U)	NDA	08-Apr-2022	07-Apr-2028
12	Bhojpur-Buxar	Sonu Rai	RJD	MGB	14-May-2026	07-Apr-2028
13	Munger-Jamui-Lakhisarai-Sheikhpura	Ajay Kumar Singh	RJD	MGB	08-Apr-2022	07-Apr-2028
14	Gaya-Jehanabad-Arwal	Rinku Yadav	RJD	MGB	08-Apr-2022	07-Apr-2028
15	West Champaran	Saurabh Kumar	RJD	MGB	08-Apr-2022	07-Apr-2028
16	Siwan	Vinod Jaiswal	RJD	MGB	08-Apr-2022	07-Apr-2028
17	Patna	Kartikeya Kumar	RJD	MGB	08-Apr-2022	07-Apr-2028
18	Saharsa-Madhepura-Supaul	Ajay Kumar Singh	RJD	MGB	08-Apr-2022	07-Apr-2028
19	Begusarai-Khagaria	Rajeev Kumar	INC	MGB	08-Apr-2022	07-Apr-2028
20	Nawada	Ashok Yadav	IND	None	08-Apr-2022	07-Apr-2028
21	Saran	Sachchidanand Rai	IND	None	08-Apr-2022	07-Apr-2028
22	Madhubani	Ambika Gulab Yadav	IND	None	08-Apr-2022	07-Apr-2028
23	East Champaran	Maheshwar Singh	IND	None	08-Apr-2022	07-Apr-2028
24	Vaishali	Bhushan Ray	RLJP	None	08-Apr-2022	07-Apr-2028

=== Elected from Graduates Constituencies (6) ===
Keys: BJP (3) JD(U) (2) RJD (1)

#	Constituency	Member	Party	Alliance	Term start	Term end
1	Kosi	Narendra Kumar Yadav	BJP	NDA	17-Nov-2026	16-Nov-2032
2	Gaya	Awadhesh Narain Singh	BJP	NDA	09-May-2023	08-May-2029
3	Tirhut	Bansidhar Brajwasi	BJP	NDA	17-Nov-2026	16-Nov-2032
4	Patna	Neeraj Kumar	JD(U)	NDA	17-Nov-2026	16-Nov-2032
5	Saran	Virendra Narayan Yadav	JD(U)	NDA	09-May-2023	08-May-2029
6	Darbhanga	Anil Kumar Jha	RJD	MGB	17-Nov-2026	16-Nov-2032

=== Elected from Teachers Constituencies (6) ===
Keys: BJP (3) JD(U) (1) RJD (1) JSP (1)

#	Constituency	Member	Party	Alliance	Term start	Term end
1	Gaya	Jeevan Kumar	BJP	NDA	09-May-2023	08-May-2029
2	Tirhut	Narendra Prasad Singh	BJP	NDA	17-Nov-2026	16-Nov-2032
3	Saran	Rahul Raj	BJP	NDA	17-Nov-2026	16-Nov-2032
4	Kosi	Sanjeev Kumar Singh	JD(U)	NDA	09-May-2023	08-May-2029
5	Patna	Sanjeev Kumar	RJD	MGB	17-Nov-2026	16-Nov-2032
6	Darbhanga	Suresh Prasad Roy	JSP	None	17-Nov-2026	16-Nov-2032

=== Nominated (12) ===
Keys: JD(U) (6) BJP (5) RLM (1)

#	Member	Party	Alliance	Term start	Term end
1	Ashok Choudhary	JD(U)	NDA	17-Mar-2021	16-Mar-2027
2	Ram Bachchan Rai	JD(U)	NDA	17-Mar-2021	16-Mar-2027
3	Sanjay Kumar Singh	JD(U)	NDA	17-Mar-2021	16-Mar-2027
4	Lallan Kumar Saraf	JD(U)	NDA	17-Mar-2021	16-Mar-2027
5	Sanjay Singh	JD(U)	NDA	17-Mar-2021	16-Mar-2027
6	Raj Vardhan Azad	JD(U)	NDA	13-Oct-2023	16-Mar-2027
7	Janak Ram	BJP	NDA	17-Mar-2021	16-Mar-2027
8	Rajendra Prasad Gupta	BJP	NDA	17-Mar-2021	16-Mar-2027
9	Pramod Chandravanshi	BJP	NDA	17-Mar-2021	16-Mar-2027
10	Ghanshyam Thakur	BJP	NDA	17-Mar-2021	16-Mar-2027
11	Nivedita Singh	BJP	NDA	17-Mar-2021	16-Mar-2027
12	Deepak Prakash	RLM	NDA	05-Aug-2026	16-Mar-2027

== See also ==
- List of members of the Bihar Legislative Council
- Vidhan Parishad
- Administration in Bihar
- List of states of India by type of legislature
