= 2026 elections in India =

2026 Indian elections
- ← 2024 2025 2026 2027 2028 →

Rajya Sabha elections
- Overall control: NDA hold
- Seats contested: 74
- Net seat change: NDA +13

State elections
- States contested: 5
- Net state change: NDA +1

State by-elections
- Seats contested: 15
- Net seat change: TBD (NDA -1)

The 2026 elections in India, held from April to May, included the Rajya Sabha elections, elections to the legislative assemblies of 4 states and 1 union territory, several by-elections, and several local body elections.

== Lok Sabha by-elections ==
Date	Constituency	State/ UT	Previous MP	Party	Date of vacancy	Reason	Elected MP	Party
6 Oct 2026	Nagaon	Assam	Pradyut Bordoloi	Indian National Congress	18 Mar 2026	Resignation	Devasish Sharma	Bharatiya Janata Party

== Rajya Sabha elections ==
Date	Election	Majority before	Majority after
March - November 2026	Rajya Sabha	National Democratic Alliance	National Democratic Alliance

== State Assembly elections ==
Date(s)	State/UT	Incumbent		Elected		Maps
Date(s)	State/UT	Party (Note: Note that it refers to the political party of the chief minister. The government can have other parties which are not listed here.)	CM	Party (Note: Note that it refers to the political party of the chief minister. The government can have other parties which are not listed here.)	CM	Maps
9 April 2026	Assam	Bharatiya Janata Party	Himanta Biswa Sarma	Bharatiya Janata Party	Himanta Biswa Sarma	
9 April 2026	Kerala	Communist Party of India (Marxist)	Pinarayi Vijayan	Indian National Congress	V. D. Satheesan	
9 April 2026	Puducherry	All India N. R. Congress	N. Rangaswamy	All India N. R. Congress	N. Rangaswamy	
23 April 2026	Tamil Nadu	Dravida Munnetra Kazhagam	M. K. Stalin	Tamilaga Vettri Kazhagam	C. Joseph Vijay	
23 & 29 April 2026	West Bengal	Trinamool Congress	Mamata Banerjee	Bharatiya Janata Party	Suvendu Adhikari	

== State Assembly by-elections ==
State/UT	Date	Constituency		Previous MLA	Party	Date of vacancy	Reason	Elected MLA	Party
Bihar	30 July 2026	182	Bankipur	Nitin Nabin	BJP	14 April 2026	Elected to the Rajya Sabha	Prashant Kishor	JSP
Gujarat	23 April 2026	111	Umreth	Govindbhai Parmar	BJP	6 March 2026	Death	Harshad Parmar	BJP
Gujarat	30 July 2026	145	Manjalpur	Yogesh Patel	BJP	2 June 2026	Death	Satish Patel	BJP
Karnataka	9 April 2026	21	Bagalkot	H. Y. Meti	INC	4 November 2025	Death	U. H. Meti	INC
Karnataka	9 April 2026	107	Davanagere South	Shamanuru Shivashankarappa	INC	14 December 2025	Death	Samarth Mallikarjun Shamanur	INC
Madhya Pradesh	30 July 2026	22	Datia	Rajendra Bharti	INC	2 April 2026	Disqualified	Ghanshyam Singh	INC
Maharashtra	23 April 2026	201	Baramati	Ajit Pawar	NCP	28 January 2026	Death	Sunetra Pawar	NCP
Maharashtra	23 April 2026	223	Rahuri	Shivaji Kardile	BJP	17 October 2025	Death	Akshay Kardile	BJP
Nagaland	9 April 2026	28	Koridang	Imkong L. Imchen	BJP	11 November 2025	Death	Daochier L. Imchen	BJP
Puducherry	6 October 2026	9	Thattanchavady	N. Rangaswamy	AINRC	17 May 2026	Resignation	Ashok Anand	AINRC
Tamil Nadu	6 October 2026	35	Maduranthakam	Maragatham Kumaravel	AIADMK	25 May 2026	Resignation	Maragatham Kumaravel	TVK
Tamil Nadu	6 October 2026	101	Dharapuram	P. Sathyabama	AIADMK	25 May 2026	Resignation	P. Sathyabama	TVK
Tripura	9 April 2026	56	Dharmanagar	Biswa Bandhu Sen	BJP	26 December 2025	Death	Jahar Chakraborti	BJP
West Bengal	6 October 2026	70	Rejinagar	Humayun Kabir	AJUP	13 May 2026	Resignation	Sakharav Sarkar	BJP
West Bengal	6 October 2026	210	Nandigram	Suvendu Adhikari	BJP	13 May 2026	Resignation	Hasirani Rath	BJP

== State Legislative Council elections ==
=== Bihar ===
- ^{bye} denotes by-election

Date	Constituency	Previous MLC		Elected MLC	
12 May 2026	Bhojpur-Buxar Local Authorities^{bye}	Radha Charan Sah	JD(U)	Sonu Rai	RJD
12 May 2026	MLA^{bye}	Mangal Pandey	BJP	Surya Kumar Sharma	BJP
18 Jun 2026	MLA	Sanjay Mayukh	BJP	Sanjay Mayukh	BJP
18 Jun 2026	MLA	Samrat Choudhary	BJP	Pawan Singh	BJP
18 Jun 2026	MLA	Ghulam Ghaus	JD(U)	Anil Thakur	BJP
18 Jun 2026	MLA	Bhishma Sahni	JD(U)	Sheela Pandit	BJP
18 Jun 2026	MLA	Kumud Verma	JD(U)	Nishant Kumar	JD(U)
18 Jun 2026	MLA	Bhagwan Singh Kushwaha	JD(U)	Bharti Mehta	JD(U)
18 Jun 2026	MLA	Samir Kumar Singh	INC	Shivrani Devi Prajapati	JD(U)
18 Jun 2026	MLA	Farooq Shaikh	RJD	Ashraf Ansari	LJP(RV)
18 Jun 2026	MLA	Sunil Singh	RJD	Sunil Singh	RJD
18 Jun 2026	MLA^{bye}	Nitish Kumar	JD(U)	Lalan Prasad	JD(U)
23 Oct 2026	Tirhut Graduates	Banshidhar Brajwasi	IND	Banshidhar Brajwasi	IND
23 Oct 2026	Patna Graduates	Neeraj Kumar	JD(U)	Neeraj Kumar	JD(U)
23 Oct 2026	Kosi Graduates	Narendra Kumar Yadav	BJP	Narendra Kumar Yadav	BJP
23 Oct 2026	Darbhanga Graduates	Sarvesh Kumar	IND	Anil Kumar	RJD
23 Oct 2026	Patna Teachers	Nawal Kishor Yadav	BJP	Sanjeev Kumar	RJD
23 Oct 2026	Darbhanga Teachers	Madan Mohan Jha	INC	Suresh Prasad Roy	JSP
23 Oct 2026	Saran Teachers	Afaque Ahmad	JSP	Rahul Raj	IND
23 Oct 2026	Tirhut Teachers	Sanjay Kumar Singh	CPI	Narendra Prasad Singh	BJP

=== Karnataka ===
Date	Constituency	Previous MLC		Elected MLC	
18 Jun 2026	MLA	B. K. Hariprasad	INC	B. K. Hariprasad	INC
18 Jun 2026	MLA	Tippannappa Kamaknoor	INC	Tippannappa Kamaknoor	INC
18 Jun 2026	MLA	K. Naseer Ahmed	INC	P. V. Mohan	INC
18 Jun 2026	MLA	Govindaraju	JD(S)	Shivanna Malavalli	INC
18 Jun 2026	MLA	M. T. B. Nagaraj	BJP	Vinay Karthik Prakash	INC
18 Jun 2026	MLA	Sunil Vallyapure	BJP	Raghu Kautilya	BJP
18 Jun 2026	MLA	Pratap Simha Nayak	BJP	Lingaraj Patil	BJP
23 Oct 2026	Karnataka South-East Graduates	Chidanand M. Gowda	BJP	K. M. Suresh	BJP
23 Oct 2026	Karnataka West Graduates	S. V. Sankanura	BJP	S. V. Sankanura	BJP
23 Oct 2026	Karnataka North East Teachers	Shashil G. Namoshi	BJP	Shashil G. Namoshi	BJP
23 Oct 2026	Bangalore Teachers	Puttanna	INC	A. P. Ranganath	JD(S)

=== Maharashtra ===
- ^{bye} denotes by-election

Date	Constituency	Previous MLC		Elected MLC	
12 May 2026	MLA^{bye}	Pradnya Rajeev Satav	INC	Pradnya Rajeev Satav	BJP
12 May 2026	MLA	Sanjay Kenekar	BJP	Sunil Karjatkar	BJP
12 May 2026	MLA	Dadarao Keche	BJP	Pramod Jathar	BJP
12 May 2026	MLA	Sandip Josh	BJP	Madhavi Naik	BJP
12 May 2026	MLA	Ranjitsinh Mohite-Patil	BJP	Sanjay Bhende	BJP
12 May 2026	MLA	Shashikant Shinde	NCP	Vivek Kolhe	BJP
12 May 2026	MLA	Amol Mitkari	NCP	Zeeshan Siddique	NCP
12 May 2026	MLA	Uddhav Thackeray	SHS	Bachchu Kadu	SHS
12 May 2026	MLA	Neelam Gorhe	SHS	Neelam Gorhe	SHS
12 May 2026	MLA	Rajesh Rathod	INC	Ambadas Danve	SS(UBT)
18 Jun 2026	Solapur Local Authorities'	Prashant Paricharak	BJP	Rajendra Raut	BJP
18 Jun 2026	Ahmednagar Local Authorities'	Arun Jagtap	NCP	Prajakt Tanpure	BJP
18 Jun 2026	Thane Local Authorities'	Ravindra Phatak	SHS	Ravindra Phatak	SHS
18 Jun 2026	Jalgaon Local Authorities'	Chandulal Patel	BJP	Nandkishor Mahajan	BJP
18 Jun 2026	Sangli–Satara Local Authorities'	Mohanrao Kadam	INC	Dhairyashil Kadam	BJP
18 Jun 2026	Nanded Local Authorities'	Amarnath Rajurkar	INC	Amarnath Rajurkar	BJP
18 Jun 2026	Yavatmal Local Authorities'	Dushyant Chaturvedi	SHS	Dushyant Chaturvedi	SHS
18 Jun 2026	Pune Local Authorities'	Anil Shivajirao Bhosale	NCP	Vikram Kakade	NCP
18 Jun 2026	Bhandara–Gondia Local Authorities'	Parinay Fuke	BJP	Avinash Bramhankar	BJP
18 Jun 2026	Raigad–Ratnagiri–Sindhudurg Local Authorities'	Aniket Tatkare	NCP	Aniket Tatkare	NCP
18 Jun 2026	Nashik Local Authorities'	Narendra Darade	NCP	Gokul Gitte	IND
18 Jun 2026	Wardha-Chandrapur-Gadchiroli Local Authorities'	Ramdas Ambatkar	BJP	Arun Lakhani	BJP
18 Jun 2026	Amravati Local Authorities'	Pravin Pote	BJP	Pravin Pote	BJP
18 Jun 2026	Osmanabad-Latur-Beed Local Authorities'	Suresh Dhas	BJP	Basavraj Madhavrao Patil	BJP
18 Jun 2026	Parbhani-Hingoli Local Authorities'	Viplove Bajoria	SHS	Saeed Khan	SHS
18 Jun 2026	Aurangabad-Jalna Local Authorities'	Ambadas Danve	SHS	Suhas Shirsath	BJP
18 Jun 2026	Nagpur Local Authorities'^{bye}	Chandrashekhar Bawankule	BJP	Rajeev Potdar	BJP
23 Oct 2026	Nagpur Graduates	Abhijit Wanjarri	INC	Abhijit Wanjarri	INC
23 Oct 2026	Chattrapati Sambhajinagar Graduates	Satish Chavan	NCP	Pratapsinh Patil	NCP-SP
23 Oct 2026	Pune Graduates	Arun Lad	NCP-SP	Harshada Deshmukh-Jadhav	NCP-SP
23 Oct 2026	Pune Teachers	Jayant Asgaonkar	INC	Kaustubh Gawade	BJP
23 Oct 2026	Amravati Teachers	Kiran Sarnaik	SHS	Kiran Sarnaik	SHS

=== Uttar Pradesh ===
Date	Constituency	Previous MLC		Elected MLC	
23 Oct 2026	Agra Graduates	Manvendra Pratap Singh	BJP	Manvendra Pratap Singh	BJP
23 Oct 2026	Meerut Graduates	Dinesh Kumar Goel	BJP	Dinesh Kumar Goel	BJP
23 Oct 2026	Lucknow Graduates	Awanish Kumar Singh	BJP	Kanti Singh	SP
23 Oct 2026	Varanasi Graduates	Ashutosh Sinha	SP	Ashutosh Sinha	SP
23 Oct 2026	Allahabad–Jhansi Graduates	Man Singh Yadav	SP	Man Singh Yadav	SP
23 Oct 2026	Bareilly–Moradabad Teachers	Hari Singh Dhillon	BJP	Hari Singh Dhillon	BJP
23 Oct 2026	Lucknow Teachers	Umesh Dwivedi	BJP	Umesh Dwivedi	BJP
23 Oct 2026	Varanasi Teachers	Lal Bihari Yadav	SP	Lal Bihari Yadav	SP
23 Oct 2026	Meerut Teachers	Chand Sharma	BJP	Chand Sharma	BJP
23 Oct 2026	Agra Teachers	Akash Agarwal	IND	Akash Agarwal	SP
23 Oct 2026	Gorakhpur–Faizabad Teachers	Dhruv Kumar Tripathi	IND	Dhruv Kumar Tripathi	BJP

== Municipal Corporation elections ==
=== Andhra Pradesh ===
Date	Municipal Corporation	Government before	Government after
1 Nov 2026	Anantapur	YSRCP	YSRCP
1 Nov 2026	Vijayawada	YSRCP	JSP
1 Nov 2026	Vizianagaram	YSRCP	TDP
1 Nov 2026	Machilipatnam	YSRCP	TDP
1 Nov 2026	Kadapa	YSRCP	TDP
1 Nov 2026	Kurnool	YSRCP	TDP
1 Nov 2026	Tirupati	YSRCP	TDP
1 Nov 2026	Greater Visakhapatnam	TDP	TDP
1 Nov 2026	Chittoor	TDP	TDP
1 Nov 2026	Guntur	TDP	TDP
1 Nov 2026	Nellore	TDP	TDP
1 Nov 2026	Ongole	TDP	TDP
1 Nov 2026	Eluru	TDP	JSP
26 Nov 2026	Kakinada	TDP	TBD
26 Nov 2026	Rajamahendravaram	TDP	TBD
26 Nov 2026	Mangalagiri–Tadepalli	Newly formed	TBD
26 Nov 2026	Srikakulam	Newly formed	TBD

=== Assam ===
Date	Municipal Corporation	Government before	Government after
3 Oct 2026	Silchar	Newly formed	BJP

=== Chandigarh ===
Date	Municipal Corporation	Government before	Government after
23 Dec 2026	Chandigarh	BJP	TBD

=== Goa ===
Date	Municipal Corporation	Government before	Government after
11 Mar 2026	Panaji	Non partisan	Non partisan

=== Gujarat ===
Date	Municipal Corporation	Government before	Government after
26 Apr 2026	Ahmedabad	BJP	BJP
26 Apr 2026	Surat	BJP	BJP
26 Apr 2026	Vadodara	BJP	BJP
26 Apr 2026	Rajkot	BJP	BJP
26 Apr 2026	Jamnagar	BJP	BJP
26 Apr 2026	Bhavnagar	BJP	BJP
26 Apr 2026	Karamsad Anand	Newly formed	BJP
26 Apr 2026	Gandhidham	Newly formed	BJP
26 Apr 2026	Mehsana	Newly formed	BJP
26 Apr 2026	Morbi	Newly formed	BJP
26 Apr 2026	Nadiad	Newly formed	BJP
26 Apr 2026	Navsari	Newly formed	BJP
26 Apr 2026	Porbandar	Newly formed	BJP
26 Apr 2026	Surendranagar	Newly formed	BJP
26 Apr 2026	Vapi	Newly formed	BJP
11 Oct 2026	Gandhinagar	BJP	BJP

=== Haryana ===
Date	Municipal Corporation	Government before	Government after
10 May 2026	Ambala	BJP	BJP
10 May 2026	Panchkula	BJP	BJP
10 May 2026	Sonipat	BJP	BJP

=== Himachal Pradesh ===
Date	Municipal Corporation	Government before	Government after
17 May 2026	Dharamshala	BJP	BJP
17 May 2026	Mandi	BJP	BJP
17 May 2026	Solan	INC	BJP
17 May 2026	Palampur	INC	INC

=== Jharkhand ===
Date	Municipal Corporation	Government before	Government after
23 Feb 2026	Ranchi	BJP	Non partisan
23 Feb 2026	Medininagar	BJP	Non partisan
23 Feb 2026	Adityapur	BJP	Non partisan
23 Feb 2026	Giridih	BJP	Non partisan
23 Feb 2026	Hazaribagh	BJP	Non partisan
23 Feb 2026	Dhanbad	Non partisan	Non partisan
23 Feb 2026	Chas	Non partisan	Non partisan
23 Feb 2026	Deoghar	Non partisan	Non partisan
23 Feb 2026	Mango	Newly formed	Non partisan

=== Maharashtra ===
Date	Municipal Corporation	Government before	Government after
15 Jan 2026	Brihanmumbai	SS	BJP
15 Jan 2026	Chhatrapati Sambhajinagar	SS	BJP
15 Jan 2026	Jalgaon	SS	BJP
15 Jan 2026	Ahilyanagar	SS	NCP
15 Jan 2026	Thane	SS	SHS
15 Jan 2026	Kalyan-Dombivli	SS	SHS
15 Jan 2026	Ulhasnagar	SS	SHS
15 Jan 2026	Vasai-Virar	BVA	BVA
15 Jan 2026	Latur	INC	INC
15 Jan 2026	Bhiwandi-Nizampur	INC	IND
15 Jan 2026	Malegaon	INC	ISLAM
15 Jan 2026	Parbhani	INC	SS(UBT)
15 Jan 2026	Kolhapur	INC	BJP
15 Jan 2026	Nanded-Waghala	INC	BJP
15 Jan 2026	Navi Mumbai	NCP	BJP
15 Jan 2026	Pune	BJP	BJP
15 Jan 2026	Nagpur	BJP	BJP
15 Jan 2026	Pimpri-Chinchwad	BJP	BJP
15 Jan 2026	Nashik	BJP	BJP
15 Jan 2026	Solapur	BJP	BJP
15 Jan 2026	Amravati	BJP	BJP
15 Jan 2026	Akola	BJP	BJP
15 Jan 2026	Mira-Bhayandar	BJP	BJP
15 Jan 2026	Panvel	BJP	BJP
15 Jan 2026	Sangli-Miraj-Kupwad	BJP	BJP
15 Jan 2026	Dhule	BJP	BJP
15 Jan 2026	Chandrapur	BJP	BJP
15 Jan 2026	Ichalkaranji	Newly formed	BJP
15 Jan 2026	Jalna	Newly formed	BJP

=== Mizoram ===
Date	Municipal Corporation	Government before	Government after
21 Apr 2026	Aizawl	MNF	ZPM

=== Punjab ===
Date	Municipal Corporation	Government before	Government after
26 May 2026	Abohar	BJP	BJP
26 May 2026	Pathankot	INC	BJP
26 May 2026	Moga	INC	AAP
26 May 2026	Batala	INC	AAP
26 May 2026	Mohali	INC	AAP
26 May 2026	Kapurthala	INC	AAP
26 May 2026	Bathinda	AAP	AAP
26 May 2026	Barnala	Newly formed	AAP
5 Jul 2026	Hoshiarpur	INC	AAP

=== Rajasthan ===
Date	Municipal Corporation	Government before	Government after
9 & 11 Sep 2026	Bikaner	BJP	INC
9 & 11 Sep 2026	Ajmer	BJP	BJP
9 & 11 Sep 2026	Udaipur	BJP	BJP
9 & 11 Sep 2026	Jaipur (Note: Erstwhile Jaipur Greater and Jaipur Heritage)	BJP	BJP
9 & 11 Sep 2026	Jodhpur (Note: Erstwhile Jodhpur North and Jodhpur South)	BJP	BJP
9 & 11 Sep 2026	Jodhpur	INC	BJP
9 & 11 Sep 2026	Bharatpur	INC	BJP
9 & 11 Sep 2026	Kota (Note: Erstwhile Kota North and Kota South)	INC	BJP
9 & 11 Sep 2026	Alwar	Newly formed	BJP
9 & 11 Sep 2026	Bhilwara	Newly formed	BJP
9 & 11 Sep 2026	Pali	Newly formed	BJP

=== Sikkim ===
Date	Municipal Corporation	Government before	Government after
24 Apr 2026	Gangtok	Non partisan	SKM

=== Telangana ===
Date	Municipal Corporation	Government before	Government after
11 Feb 2026	Karimnagar	BRS	BJP
11 Feb 2026	Nizamabad	BRS	INC
11 Feb 2026	Ramagundam	BRS	INC
11 Feb 2026	Mahabubnagar	Newly formed	INC
11 Feb 2026	Mancherial	Newly formed	INC
11 Feb 2026	Nalgonda	Newly formed	INC
11 Feb 2026	Kothagudem	Newly formed	CPI

=== Tripura ===
Date	Municipal Corporation	Government before	Government after
27 Nov 2026	Agartala	BJP	TBA

== Autonomous District Council elections ==
Date	Autonomous Council	State/ UT	Government before	Government after
12 Apr 2026	Tripura Tribal Areas	Tripura	TMP	TMP
30 Nov 2026	Sonowal Kachari	Assam	BJP	TBD
30 Nov 2026	Mising	Assam	SGS	TBD
4 Dec 2026	Kargil	Ladakh	JKNC (Erstwhile LAHDC, Kargil)	TBD
4 Dec 2026	Drass	Ladakh	JKNC (Erstwhile LAHDC, Kargil)	TBD
4 Dec 2026	Sankoo	Ladakh	JKNC (Erstwhile LAHDC, Kargil)	TBD
4 Dec 2026	Zanskar	Ladakh	JKNC (Erstwhile LAHDC, Kargil)	TBD
4 Dec 2026	Leh	Ladakh	BJP (Erstwhile LAHDC, Leh)	TBD
4 Dec 2026	Changthang	Ladakh	BJP (Erstwhile LAHDC, Leh)	TBD
4 Dec 2026	Nubra	Ladakh	BJP (Erstwhile LAHDC, Leh)	TBD
4 Dec 2026	Sham	Ladakh	BJP (Erstwhile LAHDC, Leh)	TBD

== See also ==
- 2025 elections in India
- 2026 Rajya Sabha elections
- 2027 elections in India
- list of elections in 2026
