= 2026 Rajasthan local body elections =

2026 Rajasthan urban local body elections
- 9 & 11 September 2026
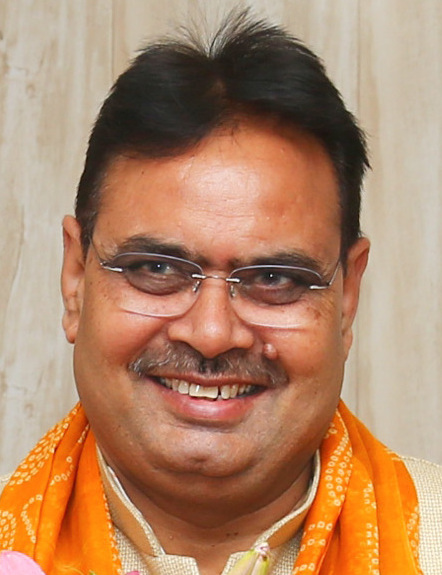

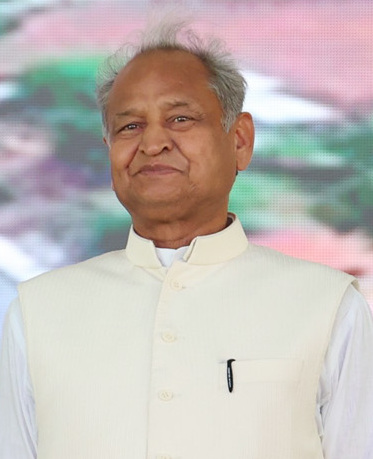
Party	BJP	INC
Wards	4,182	3,619
ULBs	204	96
Mayors	9	1

The 2026 Rajasthan local body elections were held in the Indian state of Rajasthan in the month of September in two phases on 9th September and 11th September for municipal bodies of the urban areas. The elections were held upon 10 Municipal Corporations, 51 Municipal Councils and 248 Nagar Panchayats for a total of 10,244 wards in the state. The Bharatiya Janata Party won a massive victory, securing 9 out of 10 municipal corporations as well as majority of the municipal boards.

Out of the 10 Municipal Corporations, four of them unreserved for the position of Mayor which included Jaipur, Jodhpur, Bikaner and Alwar, while rest of them were reserved for the Women and Pali being reserved for the Women of Other Backward Class.

== Election Schedule ==
The election schedule was announced on 19 August 2026, with details as follows:

Poll event	Date
Official announcement	19 August 2026
Issuance of Election notification	27 August 2026
Last Date of Nomination	31 August 2026
Allocations of Symbols to Candidates	4 September 2026
Phase I (Polling Date)	9 September 2026
Phase II (Polling Date)	11 September 2026

== Results ==
=== Party-wise ===
Party	Nigams		Parishads		Wards	
Party	Seat	+/-	Seat	+/-	Seat	+/-
Bharatiya Janata Party	9		30		4,182	
Indian National Congress	1		13		3,619	
Independent	0		2		2,273	
Rashtriya Loktantrik Party	0		0		63	
Aam Aadmi Party	0		1		42	
Communist Party of India	0		1		38	
Bahujan Samaj Party	0		0		19	
Bharat Adivasi Party	0		0		8	

=== Municipal Corporation Mayors ===
Municipal Corporations Mayoral elections
Corporation	Mayor		Deputy Mayor	
Corporation	Name	Party	Name	Party
Jaipur Municipal Corporation (W)	Sunil Kothari	Bharatiya Janata Party	Saroj Kanwar	Bharatiya Janata Party
Ajmer Municipal Corporation (W)	Anamika Sharma	Bharatiya Janata Party	Hemant Sankha	Bharatiya Janata Party
Alwar Municipal Corporation (W)	Sumanlata Agarwal	Bharatiya Janata Party	Ajay Punia	Bharatiya Janata Party
Bharatpur Municipal Corporation (W)	Anuradha Singh	Bharatiya Janata Party	Ambika Saini	Bharatiya Janata Party
Bhilwara Municipal Corporation	Jaswant Kanwar	Bharatiya Janata Party	Radheshyam Somani	Bharatiya Janata Party
Bikaner Municipal Corporation	Anil Kalla	Indian National Congress	Pankaj Gahlot	Bharatiya Janata Party
Jodhpur Municipal Corporation	Prasann Chand Mehta	Bharatiya Janata Party	Vijay Singh Panwar	Bharatiya Janata Party
Kota Municipal Corporation	Anusuiya Goswami	Bharatiya Janata Party	Vivek Rajwanshi	Bharatiya Janata Party
Pali Municipal Corporation (OBC-W)	Namita Bubakia	Bharatiya Janata Party	Mehboob T.	Independent
Udaipur Municipal Corporation	Paras Singhvi	Bharatiya Janata Party	Dinesh Bhatt	Bharatiya Janata Party

=== Municipal Council Chairpersons ===
Municipal Council Chairpersons elections
Council	District	Chairperson	
Council	District	Name	Party
Kishangarh	Ajmer	Rajkumar	Bharatiya Janata Party
Pushkar	Ajmer	Rajendra Bukoliya	Bharatiya Janata Party
Balotra	Balotra	Yogesh Kumar	Bharatiya Janata Party
Banswara	Banswara	Mukesh Rawat	Bharatiya Janata Party
Baran	Baran	Sheetal Rathore	Aam Aadmi Party
Barmer	Barmer	Gautam Chand	Bharatiya Janata Party
Beawer	Beawer	Pushpa Baldua	Bharatiya Janata Party
Bundi	Bundi	Bharat Kumar Sharma	Bharatiya Janata Party
Chittorgarh	Chittorgarh	Anil	Bharatiya Janata Party
Nimbahhera	Chittorgarh	Shilpa Bathuda	Bharatiya Janata Party
Churu	Churu	Vinay Kumar	Bharatiya Janata Party
Sardarshahr	Churu	Anita Verma	Bharatiya Janata Party
Sujangarh	Churu	Madanlal	Bharatiya Janata Party
Dausa	Dausa	Rekha Kumari Gurjar	Indian National Congress
Lalsot	Dausa	Kapil	Indian National Congress
Deeg	Deeg	Arpit	Bharatiya Janata Party
Dholpur	Dholpur	Girish Kumar	Independent
Didwana	Didwana-Kuchaman	Bhanwar Lal Panwar	Bharatiya Janata Party
Kuchaman	Didwana-Kuchaman	Mahesh	Bharatiya Janata Party
Dungarpur	Dungarpur	Sushila Gupta	Bharatiya Janata Party
Hanumangarh	Hanumangarh	Manju	Independent
Chomu	Jaipur	Ashish Dusadh	Bharatiya Janata Party
Shahpura	Jaipur	Ravish Khatana	Bharatiya Janata Party
Jaisalmer	Jaisalmer	Vijay	Bharatiya Janata Party
Jalore	Jalore	Banshilal	Indian National Congress
Jhalawar	Jhalawar	Rajesh Gurjar	Indian National Congress
Jhunjhunu	Jhunjhunu	Abdullah Gulam Nabi Agwan	Indian National Congress
Hindaun	Karauli	Vijay Kumari	Bharatiya Janata Party
Karauli	Karauli	Sushi Saini	Indian National Congress
Bhiwadi	Khairthal-Tijara	Gunjan Khatana	Bharatiya Janata Party
Khairtal	Khairthal-Tijara	Vikram Singh	Bharatiya Janata Party
Tijara	Khairthal-Tijara	Ramavtar Saini	Indian National Congress
Behror	Kotputli-Behror	Kamal Kumar	Bharatiya Janata Party
Kotputli	Kotputli-Behror	Kamal Saini	Bharatiya Janata Party
Nagaur	Nagaur	Santosh	Bharatiya Janata Party
Phalodi	Phalodi	Meghraj	Bharatiya Janata Party
Pratapgarh	Pratapgarh	Jyoti Soni	Indian National Congress
Rajsamand	Rajsamand	Anita Paliwal	Bharatiya Janata Party
Salumbar	Salumbar	Naresh Kumar	Indian National Congress
Gangapur	Sawai Madhopur	Krishna Kumar	Indian National Congress
Sawai Madhopur	Sawai Madhopur	Mewa Chaudhary	Bharatiya Janata Party
Fatehpur	Sikar	Anju	Bharatiya Janata Party
Sikar	Sikar	Khadija Bano	Indian National Congress
Sirohi	Sirohi	Ritu Jain	Indian National Congress
Sri Ganganagar	Sri Ganganagar	Ajay Dawara	Bharatiya Janata Party
Tonk	Tonk	Mayank Goyal	Indian National Congress

== See also ==
2026 Rajasthan rural local body elections
