= Dharamshala (disambiguation) =

Dharamshala (or Dharamsala) is a city in Himachal Pradesh, India.

Dharamshala or Dharamsala may also refer to:

- Dharamshala Municipal Corporation, the municipal corporation of Dharamshala, Himachal Pradesh, India
- Dharamshala (Vidhan Sabha constituency), of the Himachal Pradesh Legislative Assembly
- Dharmasala, Jajpur, Odisha, a small town near Jajpur in Odisha, India
  - Dharmasala (Vidhan Sabha constituency), of the Odisha Legislative Assembly
- Dharmashala, Kannur, a small town in Kannur, Kerala, India
- Dharmasala, houses of rest for travelers and pilgrims
- Dharamshala (type of building), resthouses or sarais in India or Nepal
