= Bharatpur Development Authority =

Development Authority in India

- BHDA

Agency overview
- Jurisdiction: Rajasthan
- Status: Active
- Headquarters: Bharatpur, Rajasthan, India
- Parent department: Government of Rajasthan

Bharatpur Development Authority (BHDA) is a government agency established by the Government of Rajasthan in late 2024. It was created to oversee and coordinate urban and rural development in the Bharatpur district. The authority works in coordination with the Bharatpur Municipal Corporation to implement planning and infrastructure projects in the region.
