= G P Pradhan =

Indian politician (1922–2010)

Ganesh Prabhakar Pradhan

Member of the Maharashtra Legislative Council
- In office 1972–1984
- Constituency: Pune Graduates

Personal details
- Born: August 26, 1922
- Died: May 29, 2010 (aged 87) Pune, Maharashtra, India
- Citizenship: Indian
- Party: Socialist
- Occupation: Politician

Ganesh Prabhakar Pradhan (26 August 1922 – 29 May 2010) was a socialist politician from the state of Maharashtra. Pradhan was a member of the Maharashtra Legislative Council from 1972 to 1984.
