= Satendrabhai Patel =

Satendrabhai Patel is an Indian politician who is a member of the Manjalpur Assembly constituency. They won the election by a margin of 30630. They are a member of the party Bharatiya Janata Party.
