= Chandulal =

Chandulal is a surname and a given name. Notable people with the name include:

== Given name ==
- Chandulal Chandrakar (1920–1995), Indian journalist and politician
- Chandulal Chunilal Desai (born 1900), Indian politician
- Chandulal Jain, popular Kannada film director and producer
- Chandulal Patel (born 1965), Indian politician
- Chandulal Sahu (born 1959), Indian politician
- Chandulal Shah (1898–1975), director, producer and screenwriter of Indian films
- Chandulal Madhavlal Trivedi (1893–1980), Indian administrator and civil servant

== Surname ==
- Azmeera Chandulal (1954–2021), Indian politician who served as Tourism and Tribal Welfare Minister of Telangana

== See also ==
- Chandulal Chandrakar Patrakarita Avam Jansanchar Vishwavidyalaya, journalism and mass communication university in Raipur, Chhattisgarh, India
