= Brijwasi =

Brijwasi is an Indian surname. Notable people with the surname include:

- Banshidhar Brajwasi, Indian politician
- Hemant Brijwasi (born 1997/98), Indian singer
