= Sharad Ranpise =

Indian politician (1951–2021)

Member of Maharashtra Legislative Council
- In office 27 July 2018 – 22 November 2021
- Governor: C. Vidyasagar Rao; Bhagat Singh Koshyari
- Chairman: Ramraje Naik Nimbalkar
- Preceded by: himself
- Succeeded by: Pradnya Rajeev Satav
- Constituency: Elected by MLAs

Personal details
- Born: 18 September 1951
- Died: 23 September 2021 (aged 70)
- Party: Indian National Congress

Sharad Ranpise (18 September 1951 – 23 September 2021) was an Indian politician who was a member of the Indian National Congress. On 10 July 2018, he was re-elected unopposed with 10 others to the Maharashtra Legislative Council.
