= Bharatpur, Rajasthan =

Bharatpur Lohagarh City
- City
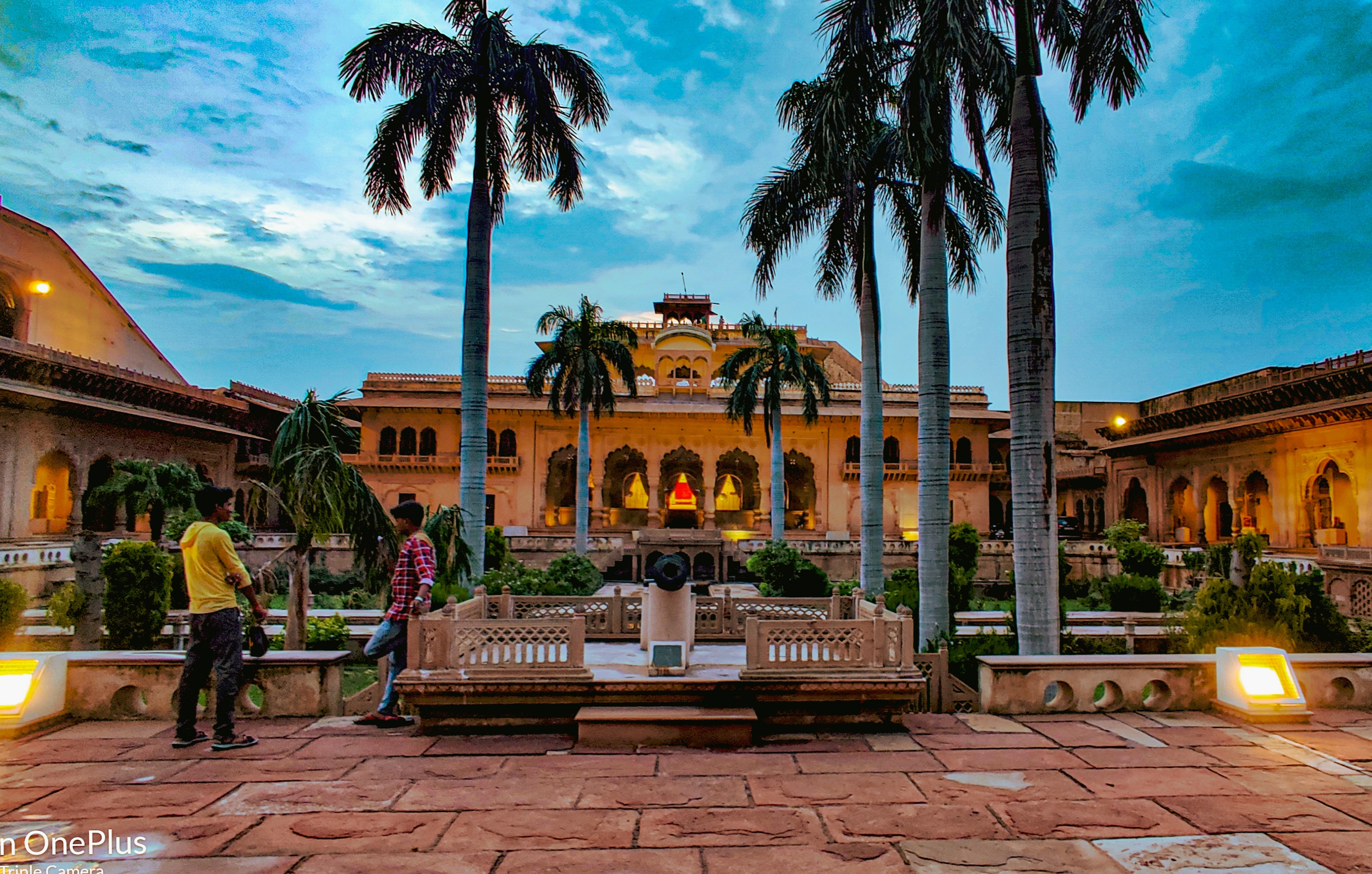
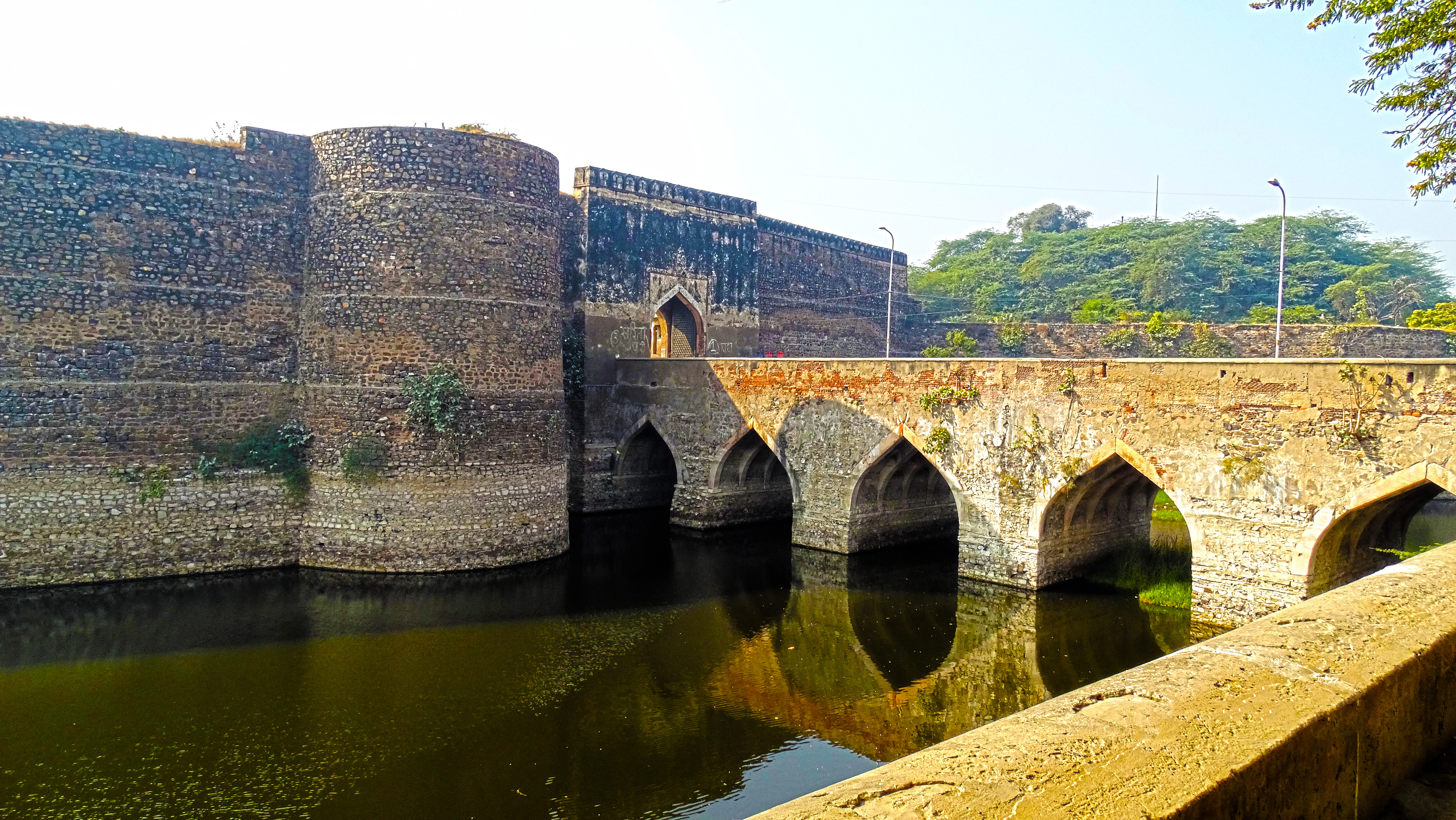
- Top to Bottom : Bharatpur Government Museum, Lohagarh Fort and Keoladeo National Park

- Location in Rajasthan, India Bharatpur (Rajasthan)
- Coordinates: 27.22°N 77.48°E
- Country: India
- State: Rajasthan
- District: Bharatpur
- Established: 1733
- Founder: Suraj Mal
- Named for: Bharat- A historical warrior famous in the area

Government
  - Type: Mayor–Council
  - Body: Bharatpur Municipal Corporation; Bharatpur Development Authority (will be formed)
  - Mayor: Anuradha Singh (BJP)

Area
  - Total: 48 km^{2} (19 sq mi)
- Elevation: 183 m (600 ft)

Population (2011)
  - Total: 252,838
  - Density: 5,300/km^{2} (14,000/sq mi)

Languages
  - Official: Rajasthani, Braj Bhasha, English, Hindi
- Time zone: UTC+5:30 (IST)
- PIN: 321001
- Area code: (+91) 5644
- ISO 3166 code: RJ-IN
- Vehicle registration: RJ-05
- Website: Bharatpur District

Bharatpur is a city in the Indian state of Rajasthan, 189 km (117 mi) south of India's capital, New Delhi, 184 km (114 mi) from Rajasthan's capital Jaipur, 56 km (35 mi) west of Agra of Uttar Pradesh and 36 km (22 mi) from Mathura of Uttar Pradesh. It is the administrative headquarters of Bharatpur district and the headquarters of Bharatpur Division of Rajasthan State. Bharatpur is part of National Capital Region of India. The city was the capital of the Bharatpur State. It became a municipal corporation with 65 wards in 2014.

== History ==
Ancient Period

Bharatpur was a part of the Matsya Kingdom, one of the sixteen ancient Mahājanapadas.

== Climate ==
Climate data for Bharatpur (1991–2020)
Month	Jan	Feb	Mar	Apr	May	Jun	Jul	Aug	Sep	Oct	Nov	Dec	Year
Record high °C (°F)	29.5 (85.1)	35.6 (96.1)	41.9 (107.4)	47.0 (116.6)	48.5 (119.3)	47.8 (118.0)	46.7 (116.1)	40.9 (105.6)	41.2 (106.2)	40.5 (104.9)	39.6 (103.3)	30.7 (87.3)	48.5 (119.3)
Mean daily maximum °C (°F)	20.7 (69.3)	26.5 (79.7)	32.2 (90.0)	39.9 (103.8)	42.5 (108.5)	40.5 (104.9)	36.9 (98.4)	34.6 (94.3)	35.1 (95.2)	34.7 (94.5)	30.1 (86.2)	23.4 (74.1)	32.3 (90.1)
Mean daily minimum °C (°F)	8.1 (46.6)	12.0 (53.6)	16.0 (60.8)	22.8 (73.0)	27.4 (81.3)	28.2 (82.8)	27.9 (82.2)	26.4 (79.5)	25.4 (77.7)	20.6 (69.1)	14.4 (57.9)	8.8 (47.8)	19.1 (66.4)
Record low °C (°F)	1.9 (35.4)	1.7 (35.1)	6.8 (44.2)	11.4 (52.5)	17.8 (64.0)	18.0 (64.4)	19.2 (66.6)	22.2 (72.0)	19.0 (66.2)	12.2 (54.0)	5.2 (41.4)	2.8 (37.0)	1.7 (35.1)
Average rainfall mm (inches)	8.2 (0.32)	9.5 (0.37)	4.0 (0.16)	7.0 (0.28)	10.4 (0.41)	77.4 (3.05)	170.3 (6.70)	213.0 (8.39)	140.2 (5.52)	18.1 (0.71)	4.7 (0.19)	4.3 (0.17)	667.1 (26.26)
Average rainy days	0.8	0.6	0.7	0.7	1.2	3.6	9.2	9.8	5.8	0.9	0.6	0.5	34.4
Average relative humidity (%) (at 17:30 IST)	62	49	40	33	30	42	65	68	64	49	54	63	52
Source: India Meteorological Department

== Fairs and festivals ==
- Braj Holi Festival
- Jaswant exhibition and fair during Dussehra
- Numaish exhibition and fair

== Demographics ==
Historical population
Year	Pop.	±%
1891	43,000	—
1911	44,000	+2.3%
1941	35,500	−19.3%
1951	37,300	+5.1%
1961	49,800	+33.5%
1971	69,400	+39.4%
1981	105,200	+51.6%
1991	156,900	+49.1%
2001	205,235	+30.8%
2011	252,883	+23.2%

Religion in Bharatpur (2011)
Religion	Percent
Hinduism	93.30%
Islam	3.70%
Sikhism	1.94%
Jainism	0.73%
Other or not stated	0.33%
Distribution of religions

As of 2011 Indian census, Bharatpur has a population of 252,838.

Languages of Bharatpur (2011)
1. Hindi (71.6%)
2. Braj Bhasha (26.2%)
3. Punjabi (1.08%)
4. Others (1.06%)

At the time of the 2011 census, 71.61% of the population recorded their language as Hindi, 26.25% Braj Bhasha and 1.08% Punjabi as their first language.

== Tourist attraction ==
- Keoladeo national park
- Lohagarh Fort
- Bayana
- Ganga Mandir
- Banke Bihari temple
- Kishori Mahal
- Laxman Mandir
