= Kishor Darade =

Indian politician

- किशोर दराडे

Member of Maharashtra Legislative Council
- Incumbent
- Assumed office 8 July 2018
- Preceded by: Dr.Apoorva Hiray, Independent
- Constituency: Nashik Teacher constituency

Personal details
- Party: Shiv Sena
- Relations: Narendra Darade (Brother)

Kishor Bhikaji Darade (Marathi: किशोर दराडे) is an Indian politician belonging to the Shiv Sena party. On 28 June 2018, he was elected to the Maharashtra Legislative Council from Nashik Teacher constituency.

== Positions held ==
- 2018: Elected to Maharashtra Legislative Council.
- 2024: Second time elected to Mahrashtra Legislative Council.
