= Parbhani–Hingoli Local Authorities constituency =

Parbhani Hingoli Local Authorities Constituency is one of 78 Legislative Council seats in Maharashtra Legislative Council.This constituency covers Hingoli District.

== Members ==
Name	Term		Party
Rajani Satav	22-Jun-1994	21-Jun-2000	Indian National Congress
Ramprasad Bordikar	22-Jun-2000	17-Oct-2004	Indian National Congress
Suresh Deshmukh	18-Mar-2005	21-Jun-2006	Indian National Congress
Suresh Deshmukh	22-Jun-2006	21-Jun-2012	Indian National Congress
Babajani Durrani	22-Jun-2012	21-Jun-2018	Nationalist Congress Party
Viplav Bajoria	22-Jun-2018	21-Jun-2024	Shiv Sena
Vacant	22-Jun-2024	21-Jun-2026	N/A
Saeed Khan	22-Jun-2026	Incumbent	Shiv Sena
