= Jethanand Vyas =

Indian politician

Member of the Rajasthan Legislative Assembly
- Incumbent
- Assumed office 2023
- Preceded by: Bulaki Das Kalla
- Constituency: Bikaner West

Personal details
- Party: Bhartiya Janta Party
- Occupation: Politician

Jethanand Vyas is an Indian politician from Rajasthan. He was elected to the 16th Rajasthan Legislative Assembly, representing the Bikaner West Assembly constituency. He is a member of the Bhartiya Janta Party.

== Political career ==
In 2023 Rajasthan Legislative Assembly election, he was elected from the Bikaner West Assembly constituency, defeating Bulaki Das Kalla, the candidate from the INC, by a margin of 20,432 votes.
