= Satish Patel =

Indian politician

Member of Legislative Assembly
- Incumbent
- Assumed office 3 August 2026
- Preceded by: Yogesh Patel
- Constituency: Manjalpur

Personal details
- Party: Bharatiya Janata Party
- Occupation: Businessman, agriculturist

Satish Patel is an Indian politician who is currently serving as a member of Legislative Assembly (MLA) in the Gujarat Legislative Assembly. He represents the Manjalpur constituency in Vadodara district, and is a member of the Bharatiya Janata Party.
