= Koridang Assembly constituency =

Legislative Assembly constituency in Nagaland State, India

Coordinates: 26.26°N 94.22°E

Koridang
- Constituency No. 28 for the Nagaland Legislative Assembly

Constituency details
- Country: India
- Region: Northeast India
- State: Nagaland
- District: Mokokchung
- Lok Sabha constituency: Nagaland
- Established: 1964
- Total electors: 21,740
- Reservation: ST

Member of Legislative Assembly
- 14th Nagaland Legislative Assembly
- Incumbent Daochier L. Imchen
- Party: Bharatiya Janata Party
- Elected year: 2026

Koridang is one of the 60 Legislative Assembly constituencies of Nagaland state in India.

It is part of Mokokchung district and is reserved for candidates belonging to the Scheduled Tribes.

== Members of the Legislative Assembly ==
Year	Member	Party
1964	Tajen Ao	Independent politician
1966^	K. Tiayanger	Independent politician
1969	Tajen Ao	United Front of Nagaland
1974	Tajenyuba Ao	United Democratic Alliance
1977	Dalle Namo	United Democratic Alliance
1982	Nokzenketba	Independent politician
1987	Nokzenketba	Indian National Congress
1989	L. Nokzenketba	Indian National Congress
1993	T. Nokyu Longchar	Independent politician
1998	T. Nokyu Longchar	Indian National Congress
2003	Imkong L. Imchen	Independent politician
2008	Imkong L. Imchen	Naga People's Front
2013	Imkong L. Imchen	Naga People's Front
2018	Imkong L. Imchen	Naga People's Front
2023	Imkong L. Imchen	Bharatiya Janata Party
2026^	Daochier L. Imchen	Bharatiya Janata Party

== Election results ==
=== 2026 by-election ===
2026 Koridang by-election: Koridang
Party	Candidate	Votes	%	±%
BJP	Daochier L. Imchen	7,317	39.12	
Independent	Maj. Toshikaba (Retd.)	4,194	22.43	
Independent	Imtiwapang Kichu	3,633	19.43	
NPP	I. Abenjang Imchen	3,219	17.21	
Independent	Imchatoba Imchen	147	0.79	
INC	T. Chalukumba Ao	144	0.77	
NOTA	None of the above	48	0.26	
Majority		3,123	16.69	
Turnout		18,702	82.21	
BJP hold		Swing		

=== 2023 Assembly election ===
2023 Nagaland Legislative Assembly election: Koridang
Party	Candidate	Votes	%	±%
BJP	Imkong L. Imchen	8,340	43.56%	
NPF	Maj. Toshikaba (Retd)	7,930	41.42%	−6.48%
Independent	I. Talitsuba Imchen	2,696	14.08%	
Janata Dal (United)	T. Chalukumba Ao	138	0.72%	
NOTA	None of the above	41	0.21%	
Margin of victory		410	2.14%	1.33%
Turnout		19,145	88.06%	−2.44%
Registered electors		21,740		25.25%
BJP gain from NPF		Swing	-4.34%	

=== 2018 Assembly election ===
2018 Nagaland Legislative Assembly election: Koridang
Party	Candidate	Votes	%	±%
NPF	Imkong L. Imchen	7,525	47.90%	−17.44%
NPP	T. Chalukumba Ao	7,397	47.09%	
NDPP	C. Lima Imchen	749	4.77%	
NOTA	None of the Above	38	0.24%	
Margin of victory		128	0.81%	−30.76%
Turnout		15,709	90.51%	−5.89%
Registered electors		17,357		−7.89%
NPF hold		Swing	-17.44%	

=== 2013 Assembly election ===
2013 Nagaland Legislative Assembly election: Koridang
Party	Candidate	Votes	%	±%
NPF	Imkong L. Imchen	11,869	65.34%	11.86%
Independent	T. Chalukumba Ao	6,134	33.77%	
INC	Moatemjen	98	0.54%	−1.65%
Margin of victory		5,735	31.57%	25.26%
Turnout		18,164	96.40%	12.75%
Registered electors		18,843		−16.90%
NPF hold		Swing	11.86%	

=== 2008 Assembly election ===
2008 Nagaland Legislative Assembly election: Koridang
Party	Candidate	Votes	%	±%
NPF	Imkong L. Imchen	10,144	53.49%	50.29%
Independent	T. Chenung Longchar	8,947	47.17%	
INC	S. Moa Imchen	415	2.19%	−38.13%
Margin of victory		1,197	6.31%	4.18%
Turnout		18,966	86.03%	−13.91%
Registered electors		22,674		29.12%
NPF gain from Independent		Swing	11.04%	

=== 2003 Assembly election ===
2003 Nagaland Legislative Assembly election: Koridang
Party	Candidate	Votes	%	±%
Independent	Imkong L. Imchen	7,258	42.45%	
INC	T. Nokyu Longchar	6,894	40.32%	
BJP	K. Nokden	2,400	14.04%	
NPF	Temsukaba	547	3.20%	
Margin of victory		364	2.13%	
Turnout		17,099	97.56%	97.56%
Registered electors		17,560		15.12%
Independent gain from INC		Swing	14.34%	

=== 1998 Assembly election ===
1998 Nagaland Legislative Assembly election: Koridang
Party	Candidate	Votes	%	±%
INC	T. Nokyu Longchar	Unopposed		
Registered electors		15,254		6.17%
INC gain from Independent		Swing		

=== 1993 Assembly election ===
1993 Nagaland Legislative Assembly election: Koridang
Party	Candidate	Votes	%	±%
Independent	T. Nokyu Longchar	3,957	28.11%	
Independent	Alemwapang	3,701	26.29%	
INC	L. Chubatoshi Pongen	3,327	23.64%	−12.65%
NPF	Nokzenketba	3,052	21.68%	−7.42%
Margin of victory		256	1.82%	−5.36%
Turnout		14,076	98.19%	2.81%
Registered electors		14,368		38.59%
Independent gain from INC		Swing	-8.17%	

=== 1989 Assembly election ===
1989 Nagaland Legislative Assembly election: Koridang
Party	Candidate	Votes	%	±%
INC	L. Nokzenketba	3,574	36.28%	3.50%
NPF	Bendangtoshi	2,867	29.11%	
Independent	Imtiwati	2,558	25.97%	
NPP	L. Chubatoshi Pongen	851	8.64%	−7.48%
Margin of victory		707	7.18%	0.51%
Turnout		9,850	95.38%	4.35%
Registered electors		10,367		0.15%
INC hold		Swing	3.50%	

=== 1987 Assembly election ===
1987 Nagaland Legislative Assembly election: Koridang
Party	Candidate	Votes	%	±%
INC	Nokzenketba	3,045	32.78%	9.01%
Independent	Bendangtoshi	2,426	26.12%	
NND	Pangjungtemsu	2,320	24.98%	0.29%
NPP	L. Chubatoshi Pongen	1,497	16.12%	
Margin of victory		619	6.66%	5.78%
Turnout		9,288	91.03%	10.14%
Registered electors		10,351		4.67%
INC gain from Independent		Swing	7.21%	

=== 1982 Assembly election ===
1982 Nagaland Legislative Assembly election: Koridang
Party	Candidate	Votes	%	±%
Independent	Nokzenketba	2,025	25.57%	
NND	Dalle Nomo	1,955	24.69%	
INC	Sosangnokdang	1,883	23.78%	
Independent	Tajamyaba	1,070	13.51%	
Independent	Akangtemjen	986	12.45%	
Margin of victory		70	0.88%	−5.14%
Turnout		7,919	80.89%	−2.54%
Registered electors		9,889		66.54%
Independent gain from UDA		Swing	-17.50%	

=== 1977 Assembly election ===
1977 Nagaland Legislative Assembly election: Koridang
Party	Candidate	Votes	%	±%
UDA	Dalle Namo	2,102	43.07%	5.47%
Independent	Akangtemjan	1,808	37.05%	
NCN	N. Supong	970	19.88%	
Margin of victory		294	6.02%	−8.31%
Turnout		4,880	83.43%	−0.28%
Registered electors		5,938		−27.44%
UDA hold		Swing	5.47%	

=== 1974 Assembly election ===
1974 Nagaland Legislative Assembly election: Koridang
Party	Candidate	Votes	%	±%
UDA	Tajenyuba Ao	2,531	37.60%	
NNO	N. Subong	1,566	23.27%	3.97%
Independent	Pangerchiba	1,563	23.22%	
Independent	Nokzenketba	1,071	15.91%	
Margin of victory		965	14.34%	4.14%
Turnout		6,731	83.71%	1.61%
Registered electors		8,184		115.37%
UDA gain from UDF		Swing	2.86%	

=== 1969 Assembly election ===
1969 Nagaland Legislative Assembly election: Koridang
Party	Candidate	Votes	%	±%
UDF	Tajen Ao	1,084	34.74%	
Independent	Subongmeren	766	24.55%	
Independent	Tialiba	668	21.41%	
NNO	Tiayanger	602	19.29%	
Margin of victory		318	10.19%	
Turnout		3,120	82.11%	
Registered electors		3,800		
UDF gain from Independent		Swing		

=== 1966 Assembly by-election ===
1966 Nagaland Legislative Assembly by-election: Koridang
Party	Candidate	Votes	%	±%
Independent	K. Tiayanger	Unopposed		
Independent hold		Swing		

=== 1964 Assembly election ===
1964 Nagaland Legislative Assembly election: Koridang
Party	Candidate	Votes	%	±%
Independent	Tajen Ao	1,753	87.69%	
Independent	I. Chubatemsu	246	12.31%	
Margin of victory		1,507	75.39%	
Turnout		1,999	75.62%	
Registered electors		2,650		
Independent win (new seat)				

== See also ==
- List of constituencies of the Nagaland Legislative Assembly
- Mokokchung district
