= Bulaki Das Kalla =

Indian politician

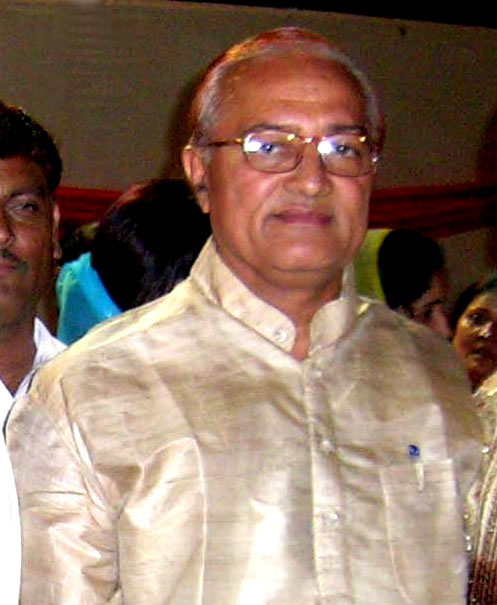

Cabinet Minister of Education (Primary and Secondary), Art, Literature, Culture & Archeology Government of Rajasthan
- In office 22 November 2021 – December 2023
- Preceded by: Govind Singh Dotasra
- Succeeded by: Madan Dilawar

Member of the Rajasthan Legislative Assembly
- In office 11 December 2018 – 2023
- Preceded by: Gopal Kishan Joshi
- Succeeded by: Jethanand Vyas
- Constituency: Bikaner West Assembly constituency

Personal details
- Born: 4 October 1949 (age 77) Bikaner, Rajasthan, India
- Party: Indian National Congress
- Spouse: Shivkumari Kalla
- Children: 4
- Education: Dungar College

Bulaki Das Kalla (born 4 October 1949) or Dr. B.D. Kalla, is an Indian politician from Bikaner Rajasthan. He is Former minister of Education (primary and secondary), sanskrit education, arts, literature and culture & ASI in Rajasthan government.

== Family and education ==
He has done BSc, MA (Economics), LLB and PhD. He is the son of Giridhari Lal Kalla. He married Shiv Kumari Kalla on 10 February 1971.he has 3 childrens

== Career ==
Kalla began his career in 1974 as a lecturer in a B.J.S. Rampuriya College in Bikaner. Then he turned towards politics and served as an MLA from Bikaner city in the Rajasthan Legislative Assembly upon winning assembly elections five times i.e. in 1980, 1985, 1990, 1998 and 2003.

Kalla served as the Minister for Secondary Education from 1990 and 2003 and did justice to his position with his previous experience in the education sector. Dr. B.D. Kalla was the Leader of the Opposition party from January 2004 to January 2006, as an active member of Indian National Congress in Rajasthan Legislative Assembly. He also served as President of Rajasthan Pradesh Congress Committee & Chairman of 4th Finance Commission.

In 2008 Rajasthan Legislative Assembly elections, the Bikaner constituency was split into Bikaner East (Rajasthan Assembly constituency) and Bikaner West (Rajasthan Assembly constituency) after the delimitation of boundaries by the Govt. BD Kalla lost 2008 & 2013 elections to BJP candidate Dr. Gopal Joshi (who is also Dr. Kalla's brother-in-law).

== 2018 Rajasthan Assembly Elections ==
In November 2018, INC announced its first list of candidates and Dr. Kalla's name was not in it. His supporters took it offensively which caused political turmoil in Bikaner and Congress leadership took note of it, hence allocating ticket to Dr. Kalla from Bikaner West Constituency.

In December 2018, Dr BD Kalla won & became Minister in CM Ashok Gehlot's cabinet. He is one of the three ministers who have studied up to Ph.D., out of a total of 23 ministers in Gehlot's 2018 Cabinet. He was minister of Energy, Public Health Engineering, Ground Water, Art, Culture & Archeology departments till November 2021, and currently is the State Education Minister in Rajasthan Government.
