= Arun Lad =

Indian politician; leader of the Nationalist Congress Party

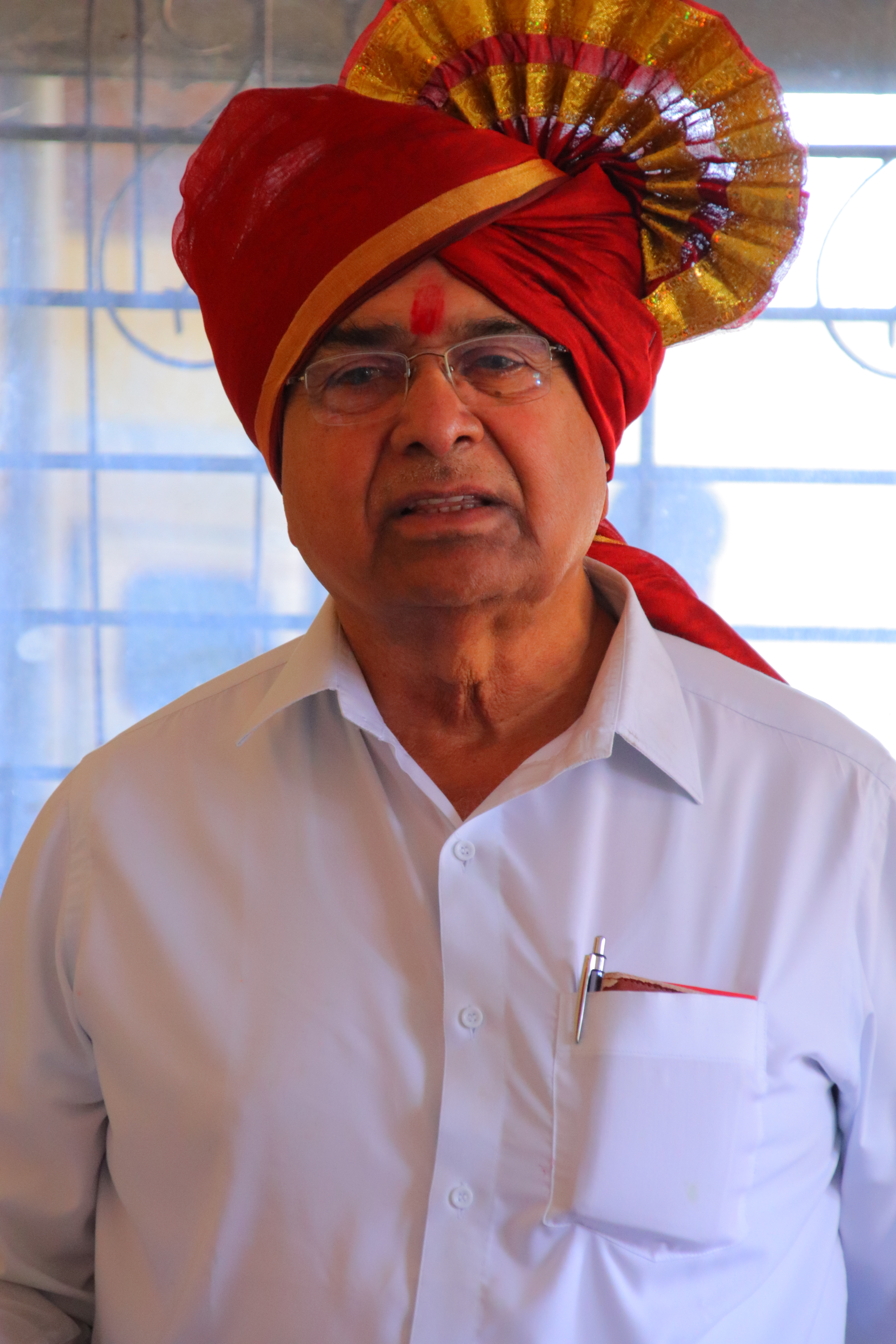

Member of Maharashtra Legislative Council
- In office 4 December 2020 – 28 October 2026
- Succeeded by: Harshaada Deshmukh Jadhav
- Constituency: Pune Graduates

Personal details
- Born: Sangli, Maharashtra, India
- Party: Nationalist Congress Party (Sharadchandra Pawar)
- Children: Sharad Arun Lad
- Parent: गणपती लाड
- Occupation: Political & Social Activist

Arun Lad is a leader of Nationalist Congress Party and a member of Maharashtra Legislative Council from Pune. He defeated BJP candidate Sangram Deshmukh by around 49,000 votes in the Pune Graduate constituency of state legislative council.

== Early life ==
Arun Lad was born in Sangli Maharashtra, as son of G.D. Bapu Lad and Vijayatai Lad. He has completed his BSC Agriculture from Shivaji University.
