= Narendra Darade =

Indian politician

- मा. आ.नरेंद्र भिकाजी दराडे

Member of Legislative Council of Maharashtra
- In office 22 June 2018 – 21 June 2024
- Constituency: Nashik

Personal details
- Party: Shiv Sena
- Relations: Kishor Darade (Brother)

Narendra Bhikaji Darade (Marathi: नरेंद्र दराडे) is an Indian politician belonging to the Shiv Sena. On 24 May 2018, he was elected to the Maharashtra Legislative Council by receiving 412 votes, beating his rival Shivaji Shahane from Nationalist Congress Party, who received 219 votes.

== Positions held ==
- 1991: Elected as corporator (Yeola municipal council)
- 2008: Won Yeola Merchant Bank election with the high majority under his leadership
- 2009: Elected as vice president of Nashik District central Co-operative Bank
- 2010: Started First Private, Santosh Agricultural Produce Market Committee
- 2011: Chairman, Yeola Agricultural Produce Market Committee(2011)
- 2012: Selected as chairman of MHADA (Nashik division) Nashik
- 2015: Elected as President of Nashik District Central Co-operative Bank
- 2018: Elected to Maharashtra Legislative Council
