= 2026 Rajasthan rural local body elections =

Rajasthan rural local body elections

- October & November 2026
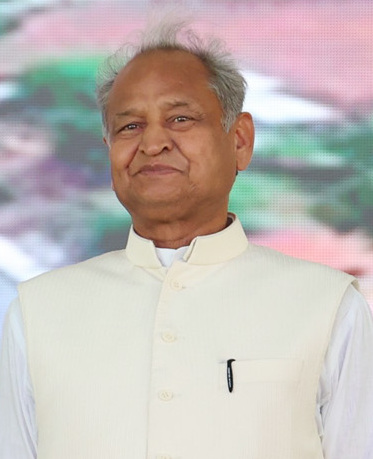

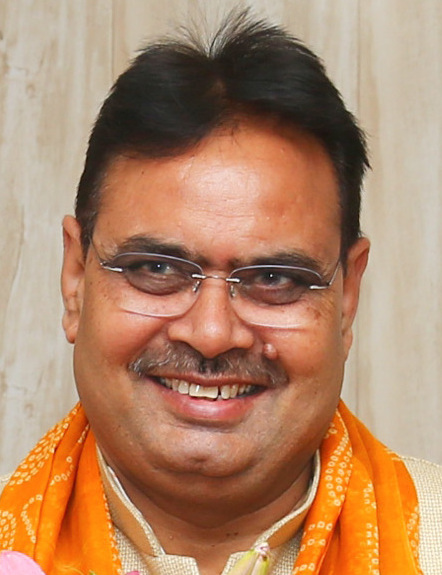
Party	INC	BJP
Wards	794	357
Wards	3,758	2,213

The 2026 Rajasthan rural local body elections are being held to elect representatives to the Panchayati Raj institutions in the Indian state of Rajasthan. The elections cover 41 Zila Parishads, 457 Panchayat Samitis and 14,403 Gram Panchayats. A total of 1,403 Zila Parishad members and 8,245 Panchayat Samiti members are being elected, along with Sarpanches and Ward Panchs at the village level.

Elections for Zila Parishad and Panchayat Samiti members are being conducted in four phases on 22 and 28 October and 3 and 14 November 2026, while elections for Sarpanches and Ward Panchs are scheduled for 24 and 30 October and 5 and 16 November. Counting for Zila Parishad and Panchayat Samiti elections was held in 37 districts on 20 November, while counting in Kota, Baran, Sri Ganganagar and Karauli was postponed until 17 December.

== Election Schedule ==
The election schedule was announced on 2026, with details as follows:

Poll event	Phase			
Poll event	1	2	3	4
Notification date				
Last date for filing nomination				
Scrutiny of nomination				
Last date for withdrawal of nomination				
Date of poll	23 October	31 October	4 November	14 November
Date of counting of votes	20 November 2026			

== Results ==
=== Party-wise ===
Party	District council wards		Block council wards	
Party	Seat	+/-	Seat	+/-
Indian National Congress	794		3,758	
Bharatiya Janata Party	357		2,213	
Rashtriya Loktantrik Party	51		497	
Bharat Adivasi Party	43		278	
Communist Party of India	7		50	
Bahujan Samaj Party	5		50	

== See also ==
- 2026 Rajasthan local body elections
