= Shivaji Rao Garje =

Indian politician

Member of Maharashtra Legislative Council
- Incumbent
- Assumed office 28 July 2024
- Constituency: Elected by MLAs

Personal details
- Party: Nationalist Congress Party
- Occupation: Politician

Shivaji Rao Garje is an Indian politician from Maharashtra and a member of Nationalist Congress Party. He was elected to the Maharashtra Legislative Council by MLA's.
