= Bikaner West Assembly constituency =

Constituency of the Rajasthan legislative assembly in India

Coordinates: 28.02°N 73.27°E

Bikaner West
- Constituency No. 13 for the Rajasthan Legislative Assembly

Constituency details
- Country: India
- Region: North India
- State: Rajasthan
- District: Bikaner district
- Established: 2008
- Reservation: None

Member of Legislative Assembly
- 16th Rajasthan Legislative Assembly
- Incumbent Jethanand Vyas
- Party: Bhartiya Janta Party

Bikaner West Assembly constituency is one of the 200 constituencies of Rajasthan Legislative Assembly. This territory comes under Bikaner Lok Sabha constituency.

Bikaner West constituency covers all voters from parts of Bikaner tehsil, which include Bikaner Municipal Cooperation wards, 1 to 4, 14 to 19, 21, 29 to 35, 44 to 49 and 53 to 55, and Karmisar of ILRC Bikaner.

== Members of the Legislative Assembly ==
Year	Name	Party
2008	Gopal Krishna Joshi	Bharatiya Janata Party
2013	Gopal Krishna Joshi	Bharatiya Janata Party
2018	Bulaki Das Kalla	Indian National Congress
2023	Jethanand Vyas	Bharatiya Janata Party

== Election results ==
=== 2023 ===
2023 Rajasthan Legislative Assembly election: Bikaner West
Party	Candidate	Votes	%	±%
BJP	Jethanand Vyas	98,648	54.51	+10.85
INC	Bulaki Das Kalla	78,454	43.35	−4.23
NOTA	None of the above	1,584	0.88	−0.25
Majority		20,194	11.16	+7.24
Turnout		180,983	76.14	+0.4
BJP gain from INC		Swing		

=== 2018 ===
2018 Rajasthan Legislative Assembly election: Bikaner West
Party	Candidate	Votes	%	±%
INC	Bulaki Das Kalla	75,128	47.58	
BJP	Gopal Krishn	68,938	43.66	
Independent	Gopal Gahlot	6,563	4.16	
BSP	Narayan Hari	1,462	0.93	
NOTA	None of the above	1,780	1.13	
Majority		6,190	3.92	
Turnout		157,894	75.74	
INC gain from BJP		Swing		

== See also ==
- Member of the Legislative Assembly (India)
