= Nawal Kishor Yadav =

Indian politician

Member of Bihar Legislative Council
- In office 1996 – 27 October 2026
- Succeeded by: Dr. Sanjeev Kumar
- Constituency: Patna Teachers' Constituency

Personal details
- Born: 2 March 1958 (age 68) Sikandarpur Chaksale, Masaurhi (Patna), Bihar, India
- Party: Bharatiya Janata Party
- Parent: Hari Rai (father)
- Education: Ph.D., Magadh University (2001)
- Occupation: Politician, college teacher

Nawal Kishor Yadav (born 2 March 1958) is an Indian politician from Bihar and a senior leader of the Bharatiya Janata Party. He is a Member of the Bihar Legislative Council representing the Patna Teachers' Constituency since 1996.

== Early life and education ==
Yadav was born on 2 March 1958 in Sikandarpur Chaksale, Masaurhi (Patna) district of Bihar. He completed his Doctor of Philosophy (Ph.D.) from Magadh University, Bodh Gaya in 2001.

== Political career ==
Nawal Kishor Yadav was first elected as a Member of the Bihar Legislative Council (MLC) from the Patna Teachers' Constituency in 1996. He has been elected consecutively for five terms and is considered one of the prominent leaders of the Bharatiya Janata Party in Bihar.

He is known as a vocal and outspoken leader in the Bihar Legislative Council, particularly on issues related to education and teachers.

== Work and contributions ==
Yadav, a teacher-turned-politician, has been actively associated with the education sector and has worked on improving schools and colleges in Patna.

He has raised issues related to teachers, pay scale, and unaided colleges in the Bihar Legislative Council.

== Personal life ==
Nawal Kishor Yadav is married. His father’s name is Hari Rai.

== Controversies and public image ==
Yadav is often described as a firebrand leader and is known for strongly criticizing policies and administrative functioning, even within his own government.
