= Umesh Dwivedi =

Indian politician

Umesh Dwivedi (born 1 August 1969) is an Indian politician from the Bharatiya Janata Party (BJP) who serves as a Member of the Uttar Pradesh Legislative Council from the Lucknow Teachers' constituency.

== Early life and education ==
Umesh Dwivedi was born in Lalganj, Uttar Pradesh, to father Surya Narayan Dwivedi and mother Manorama. Dwivedi studied at Hemwati Nandan Bahuguna Postgraduate College, Lalganj, Pratapgarh, earning Bachelor of Education and MA degrees.

== Teaching career ==
Dwivedi established Saraswati Vidya Mandir Inter College in Arkha, Unchahar, Rae Bareli, where he also worked as a teacher.

== Political career ==
Dwivedi first contested the Lucknow Teachers' constituency in the 2008 Uttar Pradesh Legislative Council election but was unsuccessful.

In 2014, he contested the same constituency as an independent candidate and was elected to the Uttar Pradesh Legislative Council.

In November 2019, Dwivedi officially joined the Bharatiya Janata Party (BJP). He contested as a BJP candidate in the 2020 Uttar Pradesh Legislative Council election, receiving 7,065 votes and defeating opponent Dr. Mahendra Nath Rai by a margin of 3,247 votes, securing his second term.

In May 2026, the BJP announced Dwivedi as its candidate for the Lucknow Teachers' constituency for the 2026 election.

== Personal life ==
Dwivedi is married to Rita Dwivedi, a primary school teacher.

== See also ==
- Uttar Pradesh Legislative Council
- Politics of Uttar Pradesh
