= Bikaner Municipal Corporation =

Local civic body in Bikaner, Rajasthan, India

Type
- Type: Municipal Corporation

History
- Founded: 2016; 10 years ago

Leadership
- Mayor: Anil Kalla, INC since September 2026
- Deputy Mayor: Pankaj Gahlot, BJP
- Municipal Commissioner: Ashok Kumar Asija, RAS since September 2026

Structure
- Political groups: Government (50): INC (42); IND (8); Opposition (30): BJP (25); IND (5)
- Wards: 80

Elections
- Last election: 2026
- Next election: 2031

Meeting place
- Bikaner Municipal Corporation

Website
- Bikaner Municipal Corporation

Bikaner Municipal Corporation is the municipal corporation governing Indian city of Bikaner. Municipal Corporation mechanism in India was introduced during British Rule with formation of municipal corporation in Madras (Chennai) in 1688, later followed by municipal corporations in Bombay (Mumbai) and Calcutta (Kolkata) by 1762. Bikaner Municipal Corporation is headed by Mayor of city and governed by Commissioner.

== History and administration ==
Bikaner Municipal Corporation was formed to improve the infrastructure of the town as per the needs of local population. Bikaner Municipal Corporation has been categorised into 80 wards and each ward is headed by councillor for which elections are held every 5 years.

Bikaner Municipal Corporation is governed by mayor Sushila Rajpurohit and administered by Municipal Commissioner.

== Functions ==
Bikaner Municipal Corporation is created for the following functions:

- Planning for the town including its surroundings which are covered under its Department's Urban Planning Authority .
- Approving construction of new buildings and authorising use of land for various purposes.
- Improvement of the town's economic and Social status.
- Arrangements of water supply towards commercial, residential and industrial purposes.
- Planning for fire contingencies through Fire Service Departments.
- Creation of solid waste management, public health system and sanitary services.
- Working for the development of ecological aspect like development of Urban Forestry and making guidelines for environmental protection.
- Working for the development of weaker sections of the society like mentally and physically handicapped, old age and gender biased people.
- Making efforts for improvement of slums and poverty removal in the town.

== Revenue sources ==
The following are the Income sources for the Corporation from the Central and State Government.

=== Revenue from taxes ===
Following is the Tax related revenue for the corporation.

- Property tax.
- Profession tax.
- Entertainment tax.
- Grants from Central and State Government like Goods and Services Tax.
- Advertisement tax.

=== Revenue from non-tax sources ===
Following is the Non Tax related revenue for the corporation.

- Water usage charges.
- Fees from Documentation services.
- Rent received from municipal property.
- Funds from municipal bonds.

== Wards ==
Ward	Councillors		Assembly constituency
Ward	Name	Politiical Party	Assembly constituency
Ward 1 (OBC)	Chandrakala	Indian National Congress	Bikaner West
Ward 2	Deepak Kumar	Bharatiya Janata Party	Bikaner West
Ward 3 (OBC)	Shiv	Bharatiya Janata Party	Bikaner West
Ward 4 (SC-W)	Teeja	Indian National Congress	Bikaner West
Ward 5 (SC-W)	Manisha Singhal	Indian National Congress	Bikaner East
Ward 6	Sandeep Gahlot	Bharatiya Janata Party	Bikaner East
Ward 7 (OBC)	Geeta Devi	Indian National Congress	Bikaner East
Ward 8	Bhagwan Singh	Bharatiya Janata Party	Bikaner East
Ward 9 (SC)	Vinod Kumar Dhaval	Bharatiya Janata Party	Bikaner East
Ward 10 (OBC)	Kapil Singh	Independent	Bikaner East
Ward 11	Vikas Siyag	Independent	Bikaner East
Ward 12	Himanshu	Bharatiya Janata Party	Bikaner East
Ward 13	Surendra Singh	Bharatiya Janata Party	Bikaner East
Ward 14 (W)	Kiran Bhati	Indian National Congress	Bikaner West
Ward 15 (OBC)	Abdul Wahid	Indian National Congress	Bikaner West
Ward 16 (SC)	Poonam Chand	Indian National Congress	Bikaner West
Ward 17 (W)	Chetna	Indian National Congress	Bikaner West
Ward 18	Maqsood Ahmed	Indian National Congress	Bikaner West
Ward 19 (W)	Asha Devi	Bharatiya Janata Party	Bikaner West
Ward 20 (OBC)	Chitra Devi	Bharatiya Janata Party	Bikaner East
Ward 21 (OBC)	Rizwan Khan	Indian National Congress	Bikaner West
Ward 22	Prateek Swami	Independent	Bikaner East
Ward 23 (W)	Saroj	Rashtriya Loktantrik Party	Bikaner East
Ward 24	Gaurishankar	Indian National Congress	Bikaner East
Ward 25	Mohd. Hussain	Indian National Congress	Bikaner East
Ward 26	Sanjay Kumar Rakheja	Independent	Bikaner East
Ward 27	Dilip Kumar Banthiya	Indian National Congress	Bikaner East
Ward 28 (W)	Lakshmi Devi	Independent	Bikaner East
Ward 29 (OBC)	Govardhan Ram	Indian National Congress	Bikaner West
Ward 30	Abdul Sattar	Indian National Congress	Bikaner West
Ward 31	Puneet Kumar	Bharatiya Janata Party	Bikaner West
Ward 32	Bhagwwati Prasad Gaur	Independent	Bikaner West
Ward 33 (SC-W)	Sinwari Devi	Bharatiya Janata Party	Bikaner West
Ward 34 (OBC)	Anirudh Kumar Chaudhary	Bharatiya Janata Party	Bikaner West
Ward 35	Manoj Bishnoi	Indian National Congress	Bikaner West
Ward 36 (OBC)	Anuradha Chaudhary	Bharatiya Janata Party	Bikaner East
Ward 37	Shyam Singh Bhati	Bharatiya Janata Party	Bikaner East
Ward 38	Chhail Singh	Indian National Congress	Bikaner East
Ward 39 (OBC)	Salman Khan	Indian National Congress	Bikaner East
Ward 40 (W)	Kavita Bishnoi	Bharatiya Janata Party	Bikaner East
Ward 41	Ashwani Midha	Indian National Congress	Bikaner East
Ward 42 (W)	Lakshmi Devi	Indian National Congress	Bikaner East
Ward 43	Prakash	Bharatiya Janata Party	Bikaner East
Ward 44 (OBC)	Shubhkaran	Independent	Bikaner West
Ward 45 (SC)	Omprakash	Indian National Congress	Bikaner West
Ward 46 (OBC)	Shiv Kumar	Indian National Congress	Bikaner West
Ward 47 (W)	Savita Joshi	Indian National Congress	Bikaner West
Ward 48 (SC)	Nandlal Jawa	Indian National Congress	Bikaner West
Ward 50	Navratan Daga	Indian National Congress	Bikaner West
Ward 49 (OBC)	Sushma	Independent	Bikaner West
Ward 51	Pankaj Gahlot	Bharatiya Janata Party	Bikaner East
Ward 52	Ummed Singh	Bharatiya Janata Party	Bikaner East
Ward 53 (OBC)	Anish Ali	Indian National Congress	Bikaner West
Ward 54	Pawan Kumar	Indian National Congress	Bikaner West
Ward 55	Javed Parihar	Indian National Congress	Bikaner West
Ward 56 (W)	Annapurna	Indian National Congress	Bikaner East
Ward 57 (W)	Annapurna	Bharatiya Janata Party	Bikaner East
Ward 58	Durgadas	Indian National Congress	Bikaner East
Ward 59 (W)	Aparna	Bharatiya Janata Party	Bikaner East
Ward 60	Naval Kishore Purohit	Indian National Congress	Bikaner East
Ward 61	Giriraj Joshi	Bharatiya Janata Party	Bikaner East
Ward 62	Akbar Ali	Indian National Congress	Bikaner East
Ward 63 (OBC)	Deepak Tanwar	Independent	Bikaner East
Ward 64	Javed Ali	Indian National Congress	Bikaner East
Ward 65 (W)	Sapna Maru	Indian National Congress	Bikaner East
Ward 66 (W)	Naseem Bano	Indian National Congress	Bikaner East
Ward 67	Hemendra Bhati	Bharatiya Janata Party	Bikaner East
Ward 68	Shankar Lal Tanwar	Bharatiya Janata Party	Bikaner East
Ward 69 (W)	Leela Gahlot	Bharatiya Janata Party	Bikaner East
Ward 70	Vikram	Bharatiya Janata Party	Bikaner East
Ward 71 (SC)	Jagdish	Bharatiya Janata Party	Bikaner East
Ward 72 (W)	Nisha	Independent	Bikaner East
Ward 73	Anil	Indian National Congress	Bikaner East
Ward 74 (W)	Sarita	Indian National Congress	Bikaner East
Ward 75	Dharamvir Nahata	Indian National Congress	Bikaner East
Ward 76	Vishal KumarSoni	Bharatiya Janata Party	Bikaner East
Ward 77 (SC)	Rahul Kumar	Indian National Congress	Bikaner East
Ward 78 (W)	Zulekha Bano	Indian National Congress	Bikaner East
Ward 79 (W)	Sheetal	Indian National Congress	Bikaner East
Ward 80	Mohd. Ateek	Indian National Congress	Bikaner East

== See also ==
- List of municipal corporations in India
