= Samir Kumar Singh =

Indian politician

Member of the Bihar Legislative Council
- In office June 2020 – June 2026

Personal details
- Party: Indian National Congress
- Parent: Rajendra Prasad Singh
- Profession: Lecture in Private Degree College

Samir Kumar Singh or Sameer Kumar Singh is an Indian politician, formerly a member of Indian National Congress and Member of Legislative Council in Bihar Legislative Council.

He is the executive Chairman of Bihar INC. His grandfather, Banarasi Prasad Singh has been three time Member of Parliament from Munger. His father, Rajendra Prasad Singh was a Cabinet minister in Bihar Government.
