= Pradnya Rajeev Satav =

Indian politician (born 1976)

- प्रज्ञा राजीव सातव

Member of Maharashtra Legislative Council
- Incumbent
- Assumed office 12 May 2026
- Preceded by: Herself
- Constituency: Elected by MLAs
- In office 28 July 2024 – 18 Dec 2025
- Preceded by: Herself
- Succeeded by: Herself
- Constituency: Elected by MLAs
- In office 23 Nov 2021 – 27 July 2024
- Governor: Bhagat Singh Koshyari (formerly)
- Chairman: Ramraje Naik Nimbalkar(formerly)
- Preceded by: Sharad Ranpise
- Constituency: Elected by MLAs

Vice President of Maharashtra Pradesh Congress Committee
- In office August 2021 – December 2025
- President: Nana Patole

Personal details
- Born: March 17, 1976 (age 50) Maharashtra, India
- Party: Bharatiya Janata Party (18 Dec 2025-Present)
- Other political affiliations: Indian National Congress (Till Dec 2025)
- Spouse: Late Rajeev Satav
- Children: 2
- Education: MBBS

Dr.Pradnya Rajeev Satav (Marathi: प्रज्ञा राजीव सातव) is an Indian politician belonging to the Bharatiya Janata Party. She was elected unopposed in November 2021 to the Maharashtra Legislative Council. She also served as a Vice President of Maharashtra Pradesh Congress Committee from August 2021 to December 2025.

== Life ==
Dr. pradnya Rajeev Satav is the widow of former MP from Maharashtra Rajeev Satav. He died of complications as a result of COVID-19 on 16 May 2021 at the age of 46. The Maharashtra Legislative Council seat occupied by Sharad Ranpise became vacant when he died on 23 September 2021 and Satav was put forward as the Congress Party Candidate. The Bharatiya Janata Party candidate was Sanjay Kenekar, but he withdrew before the election leaving Satav to be elected unopposed. Sanjay Kenekar had withdrawn at the request of Devendra Fadnavis after he was requested to not have a BJP candidate by Congress party leaders.

Satav was the only woman MLC from the Congress Party in Maharashtra. Her husband shared close relations with the Gandhi family.

On 18 December 2025, Satav resigned her MLC seat from the Congress party to join the BJP.
