= Imkong L. Imchen =

Indian politician (1950–2025)

Member of the Nagaland Legislative Assembly for Koridang
- In office 2003–2025
- Preceded by: T. Nokyu Longchar
- Succeeded by: Daochier L. Imchen

Personal details
- Born: 15 June 1950
- Died: 11 November 2025 (aged 75) Guwahati, Assam, India
- Party: BJP (2023–25); NDPP (2022–23); NPF (2003–22)
- Children: Daochier L. Imchen (Son)
- Education: North-Eastern Hill University

Imkong L. Imchen (15 June 1950 – 11 November 2025) was an Indian politician from Nagaland. He was elected to the Nagaland Legislative Assembly five times from the Koridang Assembly constituency.

== Early life ==
Imkong was from Mangmetong village in Mokokchung district. He studied at North-Eastern Hill University in Shillong during which he got involved in student politics. During this time, he was also elected general secretary of the Naga Students' Federation. He joined the Indian National Congress (INC) in 1989.

== Political life ==
Imchen first won the Koridang Assembly seat in 2003 as an independent candidate. He won the subsequent 2008, 2013, and 2018 elections as a member of the Naga People's Front (NPF). He joined the Nationalist Democratic Progressive Party (NDPP) in 2022, and the Bharatiya Janata Party (BJP) in 2023. He fought the subsequent 2023 state assembly election as a BJP candidate and won.

Imchen earlier served as a minister in the Nagaland cabinet.

== Death ==
He died from a heart attack in Guwahati, on 11 November 2025, at the age of 75. He was survived by his wife, four sons, and two daughters.
