= Sanjay Bhende =

Indian businessman and politician

Member Maharashtra Legislative Council
- Incumbent
- Assumed office 2026
- Constituency: Elected by MLAs

President, Nagpur Nagarik Sahakari Bank Ltd
- Incumbent
- Assumed office 2015

President, Maitree Pariwar Sanstha, NGO
- Incumbent
- Assumed office 2009

Chief of Office Renovation Maharashtra BJP
- Incumbent
- Assumed office 2015

Vice Principal, New English High School, Nagpur
- Incumbent
- Assumed office 2013

Personal details
- Born: 18 October 1970 (age 56) Nagpur, Maharashtra, India
- Party: Bharatiya Janata Party
- Spouse: Vanashri
- Children: Aditya Bhende, Pilot & Businessman
- Occupation: Politician
- Website: www.nnsbank.co.in

Sanjay Bhende (born 18 October 1970) is the Chairman of Nagpur Nagarik Sahakari Bank Ltd, Nagpur. He was BJP State Executive member since 2013–2015. He is now Chief of BJP Offices in Maharashtra State.

His name was selected by BJP committee for Nagpur Graduate Council election after Nitin Gadkari elected as Member Lok Sabha.

== Personal & family life ==
Bhende was member of RSS since his childhood. Professionally Lecturer in Junior College at New English Highschool at Nagpur.

== Social ==
He is also President of NGO Maitree Pariwar Sanstha, Nagpur.

=== Positions held ===
==== Within BJP ====
- State Member, BJP
- General Secretary, BJP, Nagpur
- Committee Member of Booth Handling, BJP
