= Chandulal Patel =

Indian politician

Member of Legislative Council of Maharashtra
- Incumbent
- Assumed office 6 December 2016
- Preceded by: Gurmukhdas Jagwani, BJP
- Constituency: Jalgaon Local Areas Constituency

Personal details
- Born: October 10, 1965 (age 60)
- Party: BJP

Chandulal Patel (born 10 October 1965) is an Indian politician of the BJP. On 23 November 2016 he was elected to the Maharashtra Legislative Council from Local Areas Constituency of Jalgaon.
