= Umesh Hullappa Meti =

Indian politician

Umesh Hullappa Meti (born 1973) is an Indian politician from Karnataka. He is a Member of the Legislative Assembly from Bagalkot Assembly constituency in the 2026 by election.

Meti is from Bagalkote, Karnataka. He is the son of late HY Meti, a senior congressman and a five time former MLA, whose death necessitated the by election.

Meti became an MLA for the first time winning the 2026 by election to the Bagalkot Assembly constituency representing the Indian National Congress. He polled 98,919 votes and defeated his nearest rival, Charantimath Veerabhadrayya (Veeranna) of the Bharatiya Janata Party, by a margin of 22,332 votes.
