= Mo Farooq =

Indian politician

Mo Farooq or Mohd Farooq Shaikh is an Indian politician and formet member of the Bihar Legislative Council from 2020 till 2026 representing Rashtriya Janata Dal (RJD) Farooq study 5th class.
