= Manjalpur Assembly constituency =

Legislative Assembly constituency in Gujarat State, India

Coordinates: 22.27°N 73.19°E

Manjalpur
- Constituency No. 145 for the Gujarat Legislative Assembly

Constituency details
- Country: India
- Region: Western India
- State: Gujarat
- District: Vadodara
- Lok Sabha constituency: Vadodara
- Established: 2008
- Total electors: 263,602
- Reservation: None

Member of Legislative Assembly
- 15th Gujarat Legislative Assembly
- Incumbent Satish Patel
- Party: Bharatiya Janata Party
- Elected year: 2026

Manjalpur is one of the 182 Legislative Assembly constituencies of Gujarat state in India. It is part of Vadodara district and it came into existence after 2008 delimitation.

== List of segments ==
This assembly seat represents the following segments,

1. Vadodara Taluka (Part) Village – Tarsali (CT)
2. Vadodara Taluka (Part) – Vadodara Municipal Corporation (Part) Ward No. – 4, Kapurai (OG) 17

== Members of Legislative Assembly ==
Election	Name	Party
2012	Yogesh Patel	Bharatiya Janata Party
2017	Yogesh Patel	Bharatiya Janata Party
2022	Yogesh Patel	Bharatiya Janata Party
2026^	Satish Patel	Bharatiya Janata Party

== Election results ==
=== 2026 by-election ===
A by-election was needed due to the death of the incumbent MLA, Yogesh Patel. BJP candidate Suresh Patel won the election.

2026 Gujarat Legislative Assembly by-election: Manjalpur
Party	Candidate	Votes	%	±%
BJP	Satish Patel	55,481	67.19	▼8.66
INC	Bhikhabhai Rabari	24,851	30.09	▲17.85
NOTA	None of the above	2,247	2.72	▲0.68
Majority		30,630	37.10	▼26.51
Turnout		82,579	37.62	
Registered electors		219,494		
BJP hold		Swing		

=== 2022 ===
2022 Gujarat Legislative Assembly election: Manjalpur
Party	Candidate	Votes	%	±%
BJP	Yogesh Patel	120,133	75.85	▲10.30
INC	Tashveen Singh	19,379	12.24	
AAP	Vinay Subhash Chauhan	11,021	6.96	
NOTA	None of the above	3,234	2.04	
Majority		1,00,754	63.61	▲28.46
Turnout				
Registered electors		260,066		
BJP hold		Swing		

=== 2017 ===
2017 Gujarat Legislative Assembly election: Manjalpur
Party	Candidate	Votes	%	±%
BJP	Yogesh Patel	105,036	65.50%	−1.83%
INC	Chirag Zaveri	48,674	30.35%	+0.66%
Majority		56,362	35.15%	
Turnout				
Registered electors				
BJP hold		Swing		

=== 2012 ===
2012 Gujarat Legislative Assembly election: Manjalpur
Party	Candidate	Votes	%	±%
BJP	Yogesh Patel	92,642	67.33	
INC	Chinnam Gandhi	40,857	29.69	
Majority		51,785	37.63	
Turnout		137,601	69.81	
BJP win (new seat)				

== See also ==
- List of constituencies of Gujarat Legislative Assembly
- Vadodara district
