= Vivek Kolhe =

Indian politician and cooperative leader from Maharashtra

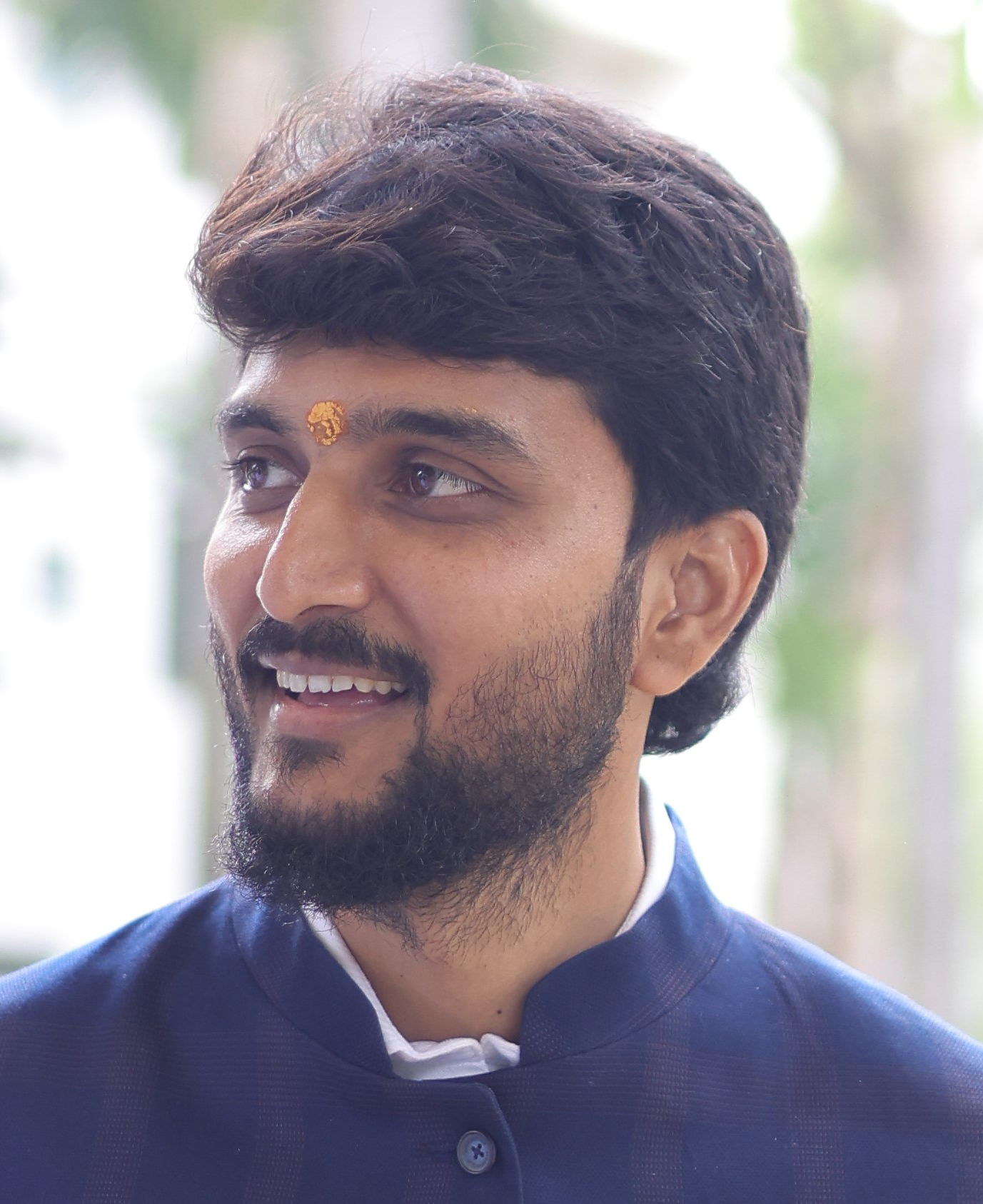

Member of Maharashtra Legislative Council
- Incumbent
- Assumed office 14 May 2026
- Constituency: Elected by MLAs

Personal details
- Born: Vivek Bipindada Kolhe
- Party: Bharatiya Janata Party
- Occupation: Politician, Cooperative Leader
- Profession: Politician

Vivek Kolhe is an Indian politician from Bharatiya Janata Party and cooperative leader from Maharashtra. He is currently serving as a Member of the Maharashtra Legislative Council, having been elected unopposed in 2026. He is known for his work in the cooperative sector and for initiatives related to green energy, rural development, and the sugar industry.

== Cooperative and green energy initiatives ==
Vivek Kolhe is associated with the establishment of India's first cooperative-based Compressed Bio-Gas (CBG) and potash granule project at the Sahakar Maharshi Shankarrao Kolhe Sahakari Sakhar Karkhana in Kopargaon, Maharashtra. The project was inaugurated by Union Home and Cooperation Minister Amit Shah.
