= Palampur Municipal Corporation =

Local civic body of Palampur, Himachal Pradesh, India

Type
- Type: Municipal Corporation

Leadership
- Mayor: Radha Sood, INC since 2026
- Deputy Mayor: Neelam Malik, INC since 2026
- Municipal commissioner: Netra Meti, IAS

Structure
- Seats: 15
- Political groups: Government (11): INC (11); Opposition (4): BJP (4)
- Length of term: 5 Years

Elections
- Last election: 17 May 2026
- Next election: 2031

Website
- Official website

Palampur Municipal Corporation (PMC) is the municipal corporation of Palampur District Kangra in Himachal Pradesh, and is the chief nodal agency for the administration of the city. Municipal Corporation mechanism in India was introduced during British Rule with formation of municipal corporation in Madras (Chennai) in 1688, later followed by municipal corporations in Bombay (Mumbai) and Calcutta (Kolkata) by 1762. Palampur Municipal Corporation is headed by Mayor of city and governed by Commissioner. Palampur Municipal Corporation has been formed with functions to improve the infrastructure of town.

== History and administration ==
Palampur Municipal Corporation was formed in 2020 to improve the infrastructure of the town as per the needs of local population. Palampur Municipal Corporation has been categorised into 15 wards and each ward is headed by councillor for which elections are held every 5 years.

Palampur Municipal Corporation is governed by Mayor Radha Sood and administered by Municipal Commissioner Netra Meti, IAS.

== Revenue sources ==
The following are the Income sources for the corporation from the Central and State Government.

=== Revenue from taxes ===
Following is the Tax related revenue for the corporation.

- Property tax.
- Profession tax.
- Entertainment tax.
- Grants from Central and State Government like Goods and Services Tax.
- Advertisement tax.

=== Revenue from non-tax sources ===
Following is the Non Tax related revenue for the corporation.

- Water usage charges.
- Fees from Documentation services.
- Rent received from municipal property.
- Funds from municipal bonds.

== Elections ==
=== 2026 ===
S.No.	Party name	Party symbol	Councillors	Change	Wards
1.	INC		11	Steady	15
2.	BJP		4	▲2	15

=== 2021 ===
S.No.	Party name	Party symbol	Councillors	Change	Wards
1.	INC		11	Steady	15
2.	BJP		2	Steady	15
3.	IND		2	Steady	15
