= Rajesh Rathod =

Indian politician (born 1977)

Member of Maharashtra Legislative Council
- In office 14 May 2020 – 13 May 2026

Personal details
- Born: Rajesh Dhondiram Rathod; 1977 (age 48–49) Umerkheda, Mantha, District Jalna, Maharashtra
- Party: Indian National Congress
- Spouse: Sindhu Rathod
- Children: 2
- Parent: Dhondiram Harinayak Rathod (father)
- Education: M. Ed., University of Pune

Rajesh Rathod () is an Indian politician belonging to the Indian National Congress. He was member of Maharashtra Legislative Council and also served as member of Zilla Parishad. He got elected to the Legislative Council by MLA's unopposed on 24 May 2020, along with 9 others. He is son of former MLA Dhondiram Harinayak Rathod.

== Early life ==
Rathod hails from Umerkheda village in Mantha Taluka of Jalna district, his father Dhondiram Rathod was a MLA from Partur. He's married to Sindhu Rathod having two daughters Riya and Rahi.

== Political career ==
Rathod is a three-time Zila Parishad member and a youth congress worker, working as a secretary at Maharashtra Pradesh Congress Committee. He also serves as NSUI District President and General Secretary of Youth Congress and is also a leader of the Banjara community in the region.

== Positions held ==
- Member of Legislative Council of Maharashtra 14 May 2020 till May 2026
