= Daochier L. Imchen =

Indian politician

Member of the Nagaland Legislative Assembly for Koridang
- Incumbent
- Assumed office 4 May 2026
- Preceded by: Imkong L. Imchen

Personal details
- Born: May 1991 (age 35)
- Party: Bharatiya Janata Party
- Parent: Imkong L. Imchen (father)
- Education: M.A. Political Science (2012), Amity University, Noida

Daochier L. Imchen is an Indian politician from Nagaland, India. He is a member of Bharatiya Janata Party and the son of former MLA Imkong L. Imchen. He was elected as a Member of the Nagaland Legislative Assembly in the 2026 Nagaland by-election from the Koridang Assembly constituency.
