= Nagpur Local Authorities constituency =

Nagpur Local Authorities constituency is one of 78 Legislative Council seats in Maharashtra. This constituency covers Nagpur district.

== Members of Legislative Council ==
| Year | Member | Party |
|---|---|---|
| 1998 | Balwantrao Dhoble | Bharatiya Janata Party |
| 2004 | Sagar Meghe | Bharatiya Janata Party |
| 2009^ | Ashok Mankar | Bharatiya Janata Party |
| 2010 | Rajendra Mulak | Indian National Congress |
| 2016 | Girish Vyas | Bharatiya Janata Party |
| 2022 | Chandrashekhar Bawankule | Bharatiya Janata Party |
| 2026^ | Rajeev Potdar | Bharatiya Janata Party |

^ - bypoll
