= Pune Graduates constituency =

Constituency of the Maharashtra Legislative Council

Pune Graduates constituency is one of 78 Legislative Council seats in Maharashtra. This constituency encompasses the entire Pune division, which includes the districts of Pune, Solapur, Satara, Sangli and Kolhapur.

== Members of Legislative Council ==
Year	Member	Party
1972	G P Pradhan	Samyukta Socialist Party
1978	G P Pradhan	Indian Congress (Socialist)
1984	Narayan Shripad Vaidya	Bharatiya Janata Party
1990	Prakash Javadekar	Bharatiya Janata Party
1996	Prakash Javadekar	Bharatiya Janata Party
2002	Sharad Patil	Independent politician
2008	Chandrakant Patil	Bharatiya Janata Party
2014	Chandrakant Patil	Bharatiya Janata Party
2020	Arun Lad	Nationalist Congress Party
2026	Harshada Deshmukh Jadhav	Nationalist Congress Party – Sharadchandra Pawar
