= Dharamshala Municipal Corporation =

Local civic body of Dharamshala, Himachal Pradesh, India

Type
- Type: Municipal Corporation

History
- Founded: October 5, 2015; 10 years ago

Leadership
- Mayor: Shamsher Singh Nehria, BJP since 2026
- Deputy Mayor: Prerna Guleria, BJP since 2026
- Municipal commissioner: Zaffar Iqbal, IAS

Structure
- Seats: 17
- Political groups: Government (11): BJP (11); Opposition (6): INC (5); IND (1)
- Length of term: 5 Years

Elections
- Last election: 17 May 2026
- Next election: 2031

Meeting place
- Dharamshala, Himachal Pradesh

Website
- Official website

Dharamshala Municipal Corporation (DMC) is the municipal corporation of Dharamshala District Kangra in Himachal Pradesh, and is the chief nodal agency for the administration of the city. Municipal Corporation mechanism in India was introduced during British Rule with formation of municipal corporation in Madras (Chennai) in 1688, later followed by municipal corporations in Bombay (Mumbai) and Calcutta (Kolkata) by 1762. Dharamshala Municipal Corporation is headed by Mayor of city and governed by Commissioner. Dharamshala Municipal Corporation has been formed with functions to improve the infrastructure of town.

== Overview ==
Dharamshala Municipal Corporation was formed to improve the infrastructure of the town as per the needs of local population. Dharamshala Municipal Corporation has been categorised into wards and each ward is headed by councillor for which elections are held every 5 years.

Dharamshala Municipal Corporation is governed by Mayor Shamsher Singh Nehria and administered by Municipal Commissioner Zaffar Iqbal, IAS.

== Revenue sources ==
The following are the income sources for the corporation from the Central and State Government.

=== Revenue from taxes ===
Following is the Tax related revenue for the corporation.

- Property tax.
- Profession tax.
- Entertainment tax.
- Grants from Central and State Government like Goods and Services Tax.
- Advertisement tax.

=== Revenue from non-tax sources ===
Following is the Non Tax related revenue for the corporation.

- Water usage charges.
- Fees from Documentation services.
- Rent received from municipal property.
- Funds from municipal bonds.

== Elections ==
=== 2026 ===
| S.No. | Party name | Party symbol | Councillors | Change | Wards |
|---|---|---|---|---|---|
| 1. | BJP | | 11 | ▲3 | 17 |
| 2. | INC | | 5 | Steady | 17 |
| 3. | IND | | 1 | ▼3 | 17 |

=== 2021 ===
| S.No. | Party name | Party symbol | Councillors | Change | Wards |
|---|---|---|---|---|---|
| 1. | BJP | | 8 | Steady | 17 |
| 2. | INC | | 5 | Steady | 17 |
| 3. | IND | | 4 | Steady | 17 |
