= Yogesh Patel =

Indian politician (1946–2026)

- Born: 23 July 1946
- Died: 2 June 2026 (aged 79)

Yogeshbhai Narayandas Patel (23 July 1946 – 2 June 2026) was an Indian politician from Vadodara, Gujarat. He was an eight-time member of the Gujarat Legislative Assembly from the Raopura constituency from 1990 to 2012 and from the Manjalpur constituency from 2012 to 2026. He represented the Bharatiya Janata Party.

== Early life and education ==
Patel was born on 23 July 1946. He finished his SSC from Sharda Mandir High School in 1964. Later in 1966, he did a one-year diploma course in civil and mechanical engineering at MS University, Vadodara. In 1978, he led an agitation against a hike in milk prices and sustained burns during the protest.

== Career ==
Patel was popularly known as Kaka locally. He was elected for the first time on Janata Party ticket in 1990 and later was a member of the Bharatiya Janata Party from 1995. He was elected from the Raopura constituency five times consecutively in 1990, 1995, 1998, 2002 and 2007 Gujarat legislative assembly elections. Following the 2002 delimitation of constituencies, he was elected from the Manjalpur constituency in 2012, 2017 and 2022 Gujarat Legislative Assembly elections. He served as the Minister of State for Narmada Development and Urban Housing in the Second Rupani ministry from 2017 to 2021. In 2022 election, he polled 120,133 votes and defeated his nearest rival, Tashveen Singh of the Indian National Congress, by a margin of 100,754 votes. On 15 December 2022, he served as the acting speaker of the Gujarat Legislative Assembly.

He was a founder of the Satyam Shivam Sundaram Committee which installed 111-foot tall Sarveshwar Mahadev statue in Sursagar Lake in Vadodara.

== Personal life and death ==
Patel was married to Saroj, he had two daughters Angira and Chiragi as well as a son, Rakesh. He died in Vadodara on 2 June 2026, following a cardiac ailment. Patel was 79.
