= Banshidhar Brajwasi =

Indian politician

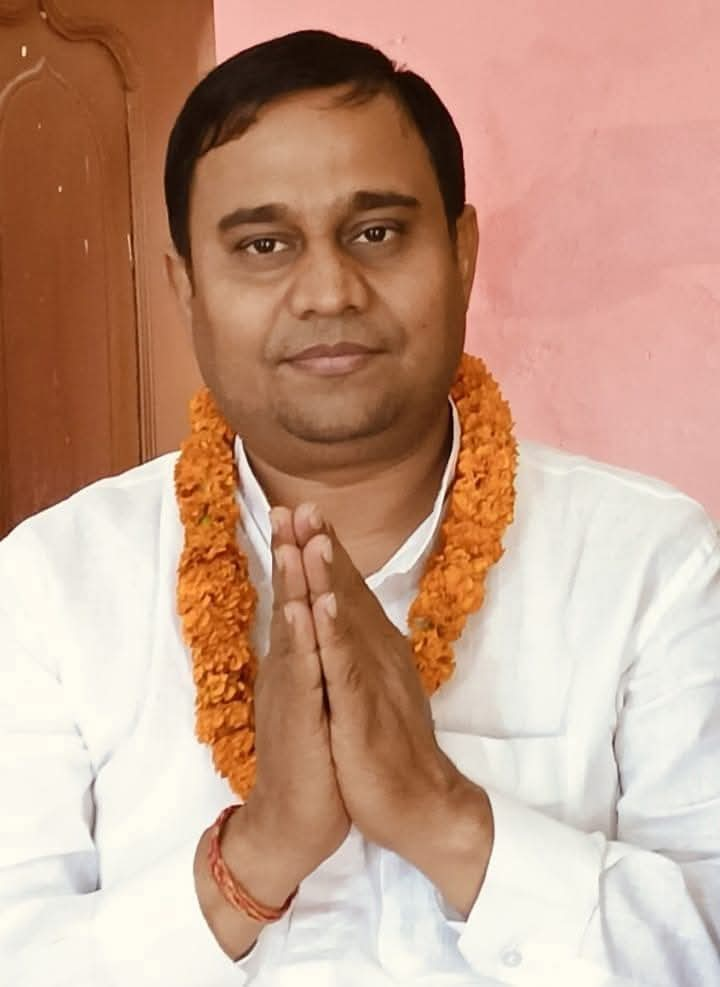

Member of the Bihar Legislative Council
- Incumbent
- Assumed office 10 December 2024
- Preceded by: Devesh Chandra Thakur
- Constituency: Tirhut Graduate

State President of Parivartankari Prarambhik Shikshak Sangh, Bihar
- Incumbent
- Assumed office 2014

Personal details
- Born: Marwan, Muzaffarpur, Bihar, India
- Party: Independent
- Other political affiliations: National Democratic Alliance
- Education: • Master of Arts (M.A.) in Hindi • Bachelor of Education (B.Ed.)
- Occupation: Politician, Activist, Teacher

Banshidhar Brajwasi is an Indian politician, activist, and former Contractual Teacher from Bihar. He is a Member of the Bihar Legislative Council from Tirhut Graduate constituency since 10 December 2024, following his victory in the by-election as an Independent candidate.

He was a teacher in a government school before his debut into politics. He had served as the State President of Parivartankari Prarambhik Shikshak Sangh, Bihar.

== Early life and political career ==
Banshidhar Brajwasi hails from the Damuchak, Marwan block of Muzaffarpur district, Bihar. He began his professional career as a teacher in Muzaffarpur, Bihar at the Utkrisht Madhya Vidyalaya in Raksaa Purvi, Marwan. He joined the teaching profession in 2005.

Brajwasi faced considerable challenges during his career. He was suspended and later dismissed from his teaching position following conflicts with higher authorities. This dismissal, rather than discouraging him, strengthened his determination to advocate for teachers' rights and push for educational reforms.

His experiences in the education sector and activism culminated in his recent electoral success as an independent candidate in the Bihar Legislative Council bypolls, where he defeated candidates from established parties like RJD and JD(U).
