= Udaipur Municipal Corporation =

Local civic body in Udaipur, Rajastha, India

Type
- Type: Municipal Corporation of the Udaipur

History
- Founded: 2013; 13 years ago

Leadership
- Mayor: Paras Singhvi, BJP since 21 September 2026
- Deputy Mayor: Dinesh Bhatt, BJP since September 2026
- Municipal Commissioner: Abhishek Khanna (IAS)

Structure
- Seats: 80
- Political groups: Government (53): BJP (53); Opposition (27): INC (23); CPI(M) (1); IND (3)
- Length of term: 5 years

Elections
- Last election: 11 September 2026
- Next election: 2031

Website
- Udaipur Municipal Corporation

Udaipur Municipal Corporation is the municipal corporation responsible for the civic administration of Udaipur in the Indian state of Rajasthan. The corporation is divided into 80 wards and is headed by Mayor Paras Singhvi of the Bharatiya Janata Party.The municipal body traces its origins to the former Udaipur City Council, which was upgraded to a municipal corporation in 2013. For the financial year 2026–27, the corporation has allocated ₹589.77 crore towards urban development works.

== History ==
Municipal administration in Udaipur dates back to December 1922, when a municipal board was established during the Mewar administration.

The municipal administration of Udaipur was subsequently brought under the Rajasthan municipal framework. The Rajasthan Municipalities (Transitory Provisions) Order, 1959 provided for the transition of existing municipal bodies to the new framework. The Rajasthan Municipalities Act, 1959 came into force on 17 October 1959, following which Udaipur functioned as a Municipal Council.

In April 2013, the Udaipur Municipal Council was converted into the Udaipur Municipal Corporation.

== Wards ==
Ward	Counciller		
Ward	Name	Party	Assembly Constituency
Ward 1	Sanjay Sharma	Indian National Congress	Udaipur
Ward 2 (OBC)	Harshwardhan Singh Kelawat	Indian National Congress	Udaipur
Ward 3	Arun Tank	Indian National Congress	Udaipur
Ward 4 (W)	Snehlata Tank	Indian National Congress	Udaipur
Ward 5	Akash Jain (Vagrecha)	Bharatiya Janata Party	Udaipur
Ward 6 (OBC)	Ajit Singh Chaudhary	Indian National Congress	Udaipur
Ward 7 (SC)	Shankar Chandel	Indian National Congress	Udaipur
Ward 8 (W)	Rukhsar Khan	Indian National Congress	Udaipur
Ward 9 (SC)	Harsh Panwar	Indian National Congress	Udaipur
Ward 10	Satish Sharma	Bharatiya Janata Party	Udaipur
Ward 11 (OBC)	Kamlesh Borana	Independent politician	Udaipur
Ward 12	Babu Lal Nagauri	Bharatiya Janata Party	Udaipur
Ward 13 (ST-W)	Ratan Bai	Bharatiya Janata Party	Udaipur
Ward 14 (OBC)	Shankar Lal Kasara	Bharatiya Janata Party	Udaipur
Ward 15	Prateek Nagar	Indian National Congress	Udaipur
Ward 16 (W)	Sumitra Nagda	Bharatiya Janata Party	Udaipur
Ward 17 (W)	Poonam Kanwar	Indian National Congress	Udaipur
Ward 18	Kuldeep Mehta	Bharatiya Janata Party	Udaipur
Ward 19	Kundan Chauhan	Bharatiya Janata Party	Udaipur
Ward 20	Sajid Khan	Indian National Congress	Udaipur
Ward 21 (OBC)	Rahul Mali	Indian National Congress	Udaipur Rural (ST)
Ward 22 (OBC)	Hidayat Ullah	Indian National Congress	Udaipur Rural (ST)
Ward 23 (OBC)	Manoj Sahu	Bharatiya Janata Party	Udaipur Rural (ST)
Ward 24	Paras Singhvi	Bharatiya Janata Party	Udaipur Rural (ST)
Ward 25	Lokesh Sahu	Bharatiya Janata Party	Udaipur Rural (ST)
Ward 26	Rajendra Parihar	Bharatiya Janata Party	Udaipur Rural (ST)
Ward 27 (W)	Nidhi Godha	Bharatiya Janata Party	Udaipur Rural (ST)
Ward 28	Vijay Ahuja	Bharatiya Janata Party	Udaipur Rural (ST)
Ward 29	Vaibhav Bhandari	Bharatiya Janata Party	Udaipur Rural (ST)
Ward 30 (SC)	Rohit Meghwal	Indian National Congress	Udaipur Rural (ST)
Ward 31 (W)	Heena Kausar Banu Pathan	Indian National Congress	Udaipur
Ward 32 (SC)	Rajendra Vasita	Communist Party of India	Udaipur
Ward 33	Jatin Shreemali	Bharatiya Janata Party	Udaipur
Ward 34 (OBC-W)	Alka Gurjar	Bharatiya Janata Party	Udaipur
Ward 35 (W)	Minal Kanthaliya	Bharatiya Janata Party	Udaipur
Ward 36 (W)	Dimple Kunwar	Bharatiya Janata Party	Udaipur
Ward 37 (SC)	Lakshmi Narayan Meghwal	Indian National Congress	Udaipur
Ward 38 (OBC-W)	Meena Bano	Indian National Congress	Udaipur
Ward 39	Jitendra Singh Shaktawat	Bharatiya Janata Party	Udaipur
Ward 40 (W)	Suman Agarwal	Bharatiya Janata Party	Udaipur
Ward 41 (ST)	Sohanlal Gameti	Bharatiya Janata Party	Udaipur
Ward 42 (ST-W)	Khushi Gameti	Indian National Congress	Udaipur
Ward 43 (ST)	Shankarlal Gameti	Indian National Congress	Udaipur
Ward 44	Ashish Kothari	Bharatiya Janata Party	Udaipur
Ward 45	Dinesh Chandra Bhatt	Bharatiya Janata Party	Udaipur
Ward 46	Tilak Menariya	Bharatiya Janata Party	Udaipur
Ward 47	Lata Nayak	Bharatiya Janata Party	Udaipur
Ward 48 (OBC)	Mahesh Puri Goswami	Bharatiya Janata Party	Udaipur
Ward 49	Deepak Nagda	Bharatiya Janata Party	Udaipur
Ward 50	Kiran Kumar Jain	Bharatiya Janata Party	Udaipur
Ward 51	Pramod Samar	Bharatiya Janata Party	Udaipur
Ward 52 (W)	Tara Suhalka	Bharatiya Janata Party	Udaipur
Ward 53	Yashwanth	Bharatiya Janata Party	Udaipur
Ward 54	Rajendra Gakhreja	Bharatiya Janata Party	Udaipur
Ward 55 (OBC)	Vishakha Khawas	Bharatiya Janata Party	Udaipur
Ward 56	Pradeep Vijayvargiya	Bharatiya Janata Party	Udaipur
Ward 57 (W)	Nirmala Paliwal	Bharatiya Janata Party	Udaipur
Ward 58 (W)	Amita Gaur	Bharatiya Janata Party	Udaipur
Ward 59 (SC-W)	Sarika Salvi	Bharatiya Janata Party	Udaipur
Ward 60 (W)	Khushbu Mehta	Independent politician	Udaipur
Ward 61 (OBC-W)	Indira Dangi	Independent politician	Udaipur
Ward 62 (ST-W)	Savita Gameti	Indian National Congress	Udaipur
Ward 63	Kishor Singh Deora	Bharatiya Janata Party	Udaipur
Ward 64	Ashok Kumar Nagda	Bharatiya Janata Party	Udaipur
Ward 65 (ST)	Kishanlal Gameti	Indian National Congress	Udaipur
Ward 66	Umesh Manwani	Bharatiya Janata Party	Udaipur
Ward 67 (SC-W)	Nisha Salvi	Bharatiya Janata Party	Udaipur
Ward 68 (OBC-W)	Vandana Prajapati	Bharatiya Janata Party	Udaipur
Ward 69 (W)	Rachna Sharma	Bharatiya Janata Party	Udaipur
Ward 70	Virendra Singh Sisodiya	Bharatiya Janata Party	Udaipur
Ward 71 (OBC)	Yogesh Kumawat	Bharatiya Janata Party	Udaipur
Ward 72 (OBC)	Naresh Vaishnav	Bharatiya Janata Party	Udaipur
Ward 73 (W)	Hitanshi Sharma	Indian National Congress	Udaipur
Ward 74 (OBC)	Pankaj Borana	Bharatiya Janata Party	Udaipur
Ward 75	Mahendra Singh Shekhawat	Bharatiya Janata Party	Udaipur
Ward 76 (W)	Kavita Joshi	Bharatiya Janata Party	Udaipur
Ward 77 (ST)	Durga Lal	Bharatiya Janata Party	Udaipur
Ward 78	Atul Chandaliya	Bharatiya Janata Party	Udaipur
Ward 79 (ST)	Babulal Gameti	Indian National Congress	Udaipur
Ward 80	Pratap Singh Rathore	Bharatiya Janata Party	Udaipur
