= Bharatpur Municipal Corporation =

Local civic body in Bharatpur, Rajasthan, India

History
- Founded: 13 June 2014; 12 years ago

Leadership
- Mayor: Anuradha Singh (BJP)

Structure
- Political groups: IND (36); BJP (20); INC (7); BSP (1); RLP (1)
- Length of term: 5 years
- Wards: 65

Elections
- Last election: 2026
- Next election: 2031

Meeting place
- Mathura Gate, Near, Bharatpur, Rajasthan 321001.

Website
- Official website

Bharatpur Municipal Corporation is the municipal corporation governing Indian city of Bharatpur. Municipal Corporation mechanism in India was introduced during British Rule with formation of municipal corporation in Madras (Chennai) in 1688, later followed by municipal corporations in Bombay (Mumbai) and Calcutta (Kolkata) by 1762. Bharatpur Municipal Corporation is headed by Mayor of city and governed by Commissioner.

== History and administration ==
Bharatpur Municipal Corporation was formed to improve the infrastructure of the town as per the needs of local population. Bharatpur Municipal Corporation has been categorised into wards and each ward is headed by councillor for which elections are held every 5 years.

Bharatpur Municipal Corporation is governed by mayor Shiv Singh Bhont and administered by Municipal Commissioner .

== Functions ==
Bharatpur Municipal Corporation is created for the following functions:

- Planning for the town including its surroundings which are covered under its Department's Urban Planning Authority .
- Approving construction of new buildings and authorising use of land for various purposes.
- Improvement of the town's economic and Social status.
- Arrangements of water supply towards commercial, residential and industrial purposes.
- Planning for fire contingencies through Fire Service Departments.
- Creation of solid waste management, public health system and sanitary services.
- Working for the development of ecological aspect like development of Urban Forestry and making guidelines for environmental protection.
- Working for the development of weaker sections of the society like mentally and physically handicapped, old age and gender biased people.
- Making efforts for improvement of slums and poverty removal in the town.

== Revenue sources ==
The following are the Income sources for the Corporation from the Central and State Government.

=== Revenue from taxes ===
Following is the Tax related revenue for the corporation.

- Property tax.
- Profession tax.
- Entertainment tax.
- Grants from Central and State Government like Goods and Services Tax.
- Advertisement tax.

=== Revenue from non-tax sources ===
Following is the Non Tax related revenue for the corporation.

- Water usage charges.
- Fees from Documentation services.
- Rent received from municipal property.
- Funds from municipal bonds.

== Wards ==
Ward	Councillors		Assembly Constituency
Ward	Name	Political Party	Assembly Constituency
Ward 1 (ST)	Karan Singh Meena	Independent	Bharatpur
Ward 2	Ambika Saini	Independent	Bharatpur
Ward 3 (SC)	Aakash Nirala	Independent	Bharatpur
Ward 4 (SC)	Arvind	Independent	Bharatpur
Ward 5	Gajendra Kumar	Indian National Congress	Bharatpur
Ward 6 (W)	Kamlesh	Independent	Bharatpur
Ward 7	Kundan	Independent	Bharatpur
Ward 8	Jitendra Singh	Bharatiya Janata Party	Bharatpur
Ward 9 (SC-W)	Kamlesh Jatav	Independent	Bharatpur
Ward 10 (SC)	Amar Nath	Independent	Bharatpur
Ward 11	Tejaram	Independent	Bharatpur
Ward 12 (W)	Sudha Sharma	Bharatiya Janata Party	Bharatpur
Ward 13 (SC)	Omprakash	Indian National Congress	Bharatpur
Ward 14 (SC)	Arjun Singh	Independent	Bharatpur
Ward 15 (SC-W)	Barfi Devi	Independent	Bharatpur
Ward 16 (SC)	Motti Singh	Bahujan Samaj Party	Bharatpur
Ward 17 (W)	Vichitra	Independent	Bharatpur
Ward 18 (W)	Meenu	Indian National Congress	Bharatpur
Ward 19 (OBC)	Manoj Singh	Bharatiya Janata Party	Bharatpur
Ward 20 (OBC-W)	Poonam	Independent	Bharatpur
Ward 21	Gopal	Rashtriya Loktantrik Party	Bharatpur
Ward 22 (OBC)	Neetu Singh	Bharatiya Janata Party	Bharatpur
Ward 23 (W)	Kiran	Bharatiya Janata Party	Bharatpur
Ward 24	Rajendra Kumar Sharma	Independent	Bharatpur
Ward 25 (W)	Aarti	Independent	Bharatpur
Ward 26	Veermati	Independent	Bharatpur
Ward 27 (OBC)	Lokesh	Independent	Bharatpur
Ward 28 (SC-W)	Neelam	Bharatiya Janata Party	Bharatpur
Ward 29 (OBC)	Rajveer Singh	Bharatiya Janata Party	Bharatpur
Ward 30 (OBC)	Rajkumar Singh	Independent	Bharatpur
Ward 31	Bhaskar	Independent	Bharatpur
Ward 32 (W)	Sulekha	Bharatiya Janata Party	Bharatpur
Ward 33	Jay Prakash Sharma	Indian National Congress	Bharatpur
Ward 34 (OBC-W)	Vandana Kumari	Independent	Bharatpur
Ward 35 (SC)	Rakesh	Indian National Congress	Bharatpur
Ward 36 (OBC)	Kiran Devi	Independent	Bharatpur
Ward 37 (SC)	Amar Singh Sawariya	Independent	Bharatpur
Ward 38 (SC)	Dheeraj Kumar	Independent	Bharatpur
Ward 39 (SC)	Jagdish Prasad	Independent	Bharatpur
Ward 40 (SC-W)	Rekha	Bharatiya Janata Party	Bharatpur
Ward 41 (W)	Yogeshwari Mudgal	Bharatiya Janata Party	Bharatpur
Ward 42	Rupendra Singh	Bharatiya Janata Party	Bharatpur
Ward 43	Prempal Singh	Bharatiya Janata Party	Bharatpur
Ward 44	Bhim Singh	Bharatiya Janata Party	Bharatpur
Ward 45 (W)	Yogita	Independent	Bharatpur
Ward 46 (W)	Sheela Devi	Independent	Bharatpur
Ward 47 (OBC)	Prahlad Solanki	Independent	Bharatpur
Ward 48	Manvendra	Independent	Bharatpur
Ward 49	Yogesh Kumar	Indian National Congress	Bharatpur
Ward 50 (OBC)	Lakshmi Devi	Bharatiya Janata Party	Bharatpur
Ward 51	Sushil Sharma	Bharatiya Janata Party	Bharatpur
Ward 52 (SC-W)	Reena Kumari	Independent	Bharatpur
Ward 53 (W)	Jayshri	Independent	Bharatpur
Ward 54	Harendra Singh	Bharatiya Janata Party	Bharatpur
Ward 55	Dayachand	Indian National Congress	Bharatpur
Ward 56	Kalpesh Kumar Sharma	Independent	Bharatpur
Ward 57	Devendra Singh	Bharatiya Janata Party	Bharatpur
Ward 58	Nisha Agarwal	Bharatiya Janata Party	Bharatpur
Ward 59 (W)	Arti	Independent	Bharatpur
Ward 60	Jitrendra	Independent	Bharatpur
Ward 61 (OBC-W)	Anuradha Singh	Bharatiya Janata Party	Bharatpur
Ward 62 (SC)	Jagdish Singh	Bharatiya Janata Party	Bharatpur
Ward 63 (OBC-W)	Sunita	Independent	Bharatpur
Ward 64	Rameshwar Singh	Independent	Bharatpur
Ward 65 (OBC)	Janardan Singh	Independent	Bharatpur

== See also ==
- List of municipal corporations in India
