= Maharashtra Legislative Council =

Upper house of the bicameral legislature of the state of Maharashtra

Type
- Type: Upper house of the Maharashtra Legislature
- Term limits: 6 years

Leadership
- Governor of Maharashtra: Jishnu Dev Varma since 10 March 2026
- Chairperson of the House: Ram Shinde, BJP since 19 December 2024
- Deputy Chairperson of the House: Sachin Ahir, SHS since 1 July 2026
- Chief Minister: Devendra Fadnavis, BJP since 05 December 2024
- Leader of the House: Eknath Shinde (Deputy Chief Minister), SHS since 09 December 2024
- Deputy Leader of the House: Pankaja Munde (Cabinet Minister), BJP since 09 December 2024
- Minister of Parliamentary Affairs: Chandrakant Patil, BJP since 21 December 2024
- Leader of the Opposition: Vacant (Note: No leader of opposition because no political party obtained at least 10% of the seats in the council.) since 29 August 2025
- General Secretary: Rajendra Bhagwat, IAS

Structure
- Seats: 78 (66 Elected + 12 Nominated)
- Political groups: Government (61) MY (61): BJP (36); SHS (13); NCP (9); IND (3); Official Opposition Vacant (Note: No individual party secured 10% of seats to form official opposition.) Other Opposition (12) MVA (12): SS(UBT) (5); INC (4); NCP-SP (3); Vacant (5) Vacant (5)

Meeting place
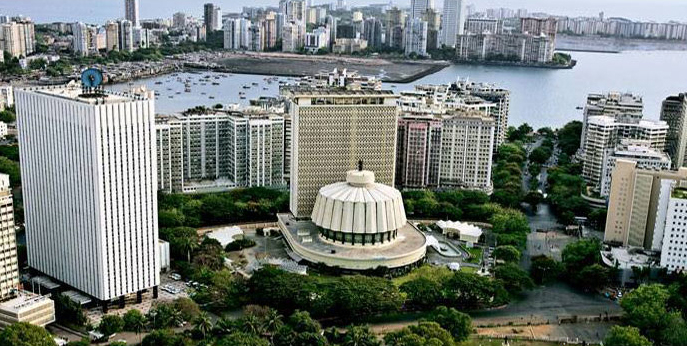
- Vidhan Bhavan, Mumbai
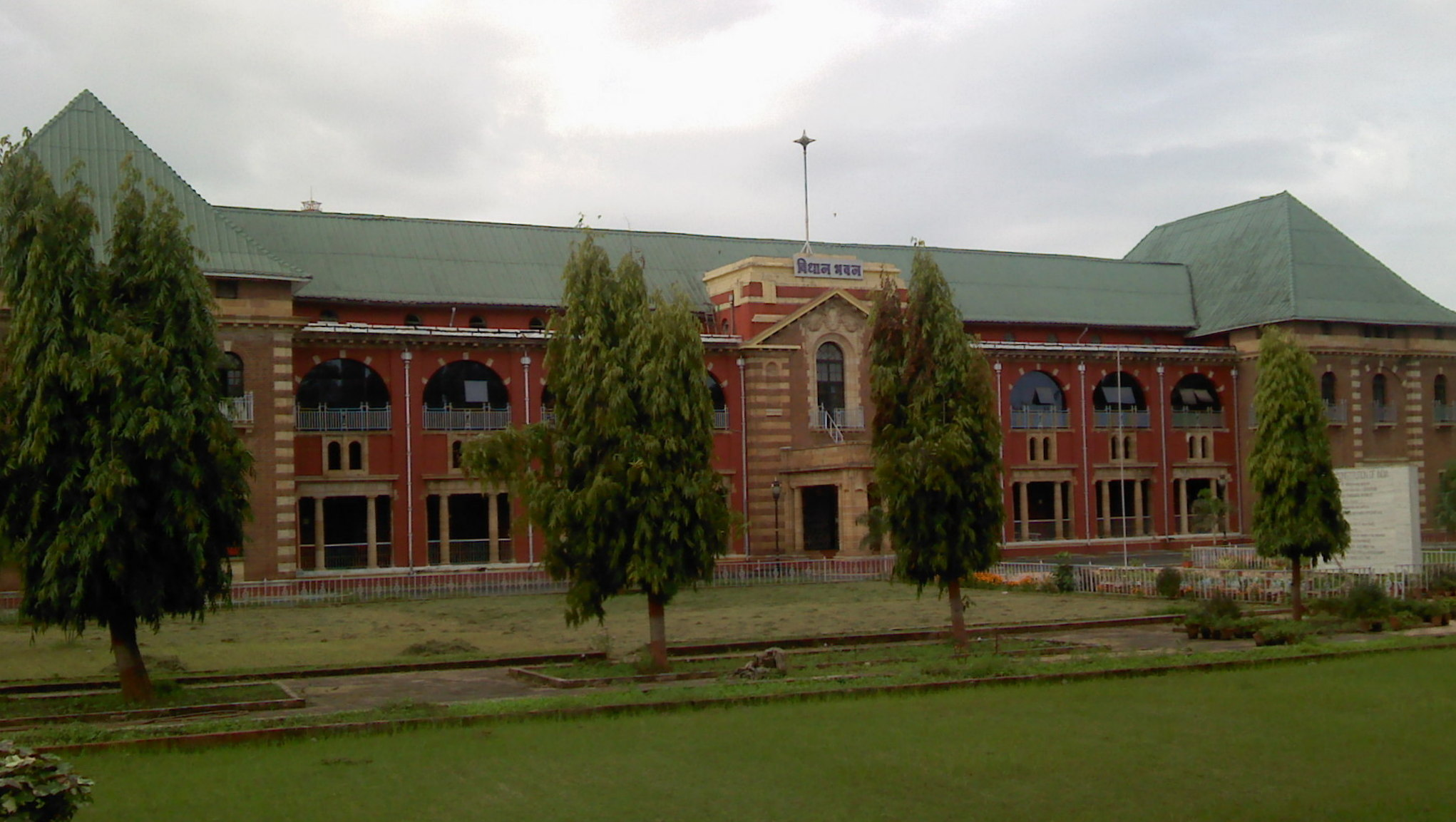
- Vidhan Bhavan, Nagpur (Winter session) Maharashtra Legislature

Website
- Government of Maharashtra; Maharashtra Legislative Council Website

The Maharashtra Legislative Council, also known as Maharashtra Vidhan Parishad, is the upper house of the bicameral legislature of Maharashtra state in western India.

== Legislature Party Leaders ==
House	Leader	Portrait	Since
Maharashtra Legislative Council Posts
Group Leader Legislature Council BJP Party	Pravin Darekar		16 December 2019
Group Leader Legislature Council SHS Party	Kishor Darade		1 March 2023
Group Leader Legislature Council SS(UBT) Party	Anil Parab		7 July 2022
Group Leader Legislature Council NCP(SP) Party	Eknath Khadse	11 March 2023	
Group Leader Legislature Council Congress Party	Satej Patil'	2 March 2023	
Nationalist Congress Party	Vikram Vasantrao Kale		

== Party's Group Leader & Whip ==
No	Party	Post	Name
01	Bharatiya Janata Party	Group Leader	Pravin Darekar
01	Bharatiya Janata Party	Chief Whip	Vijay Girkar
01	Bharatiya Janata Party	Whip	Prasad Lad
02	Shiv Sena	Group Leader	Kishor Darade
02	Shiv Sena	Chief Whip	Kishor Darade
02	Shiv Sena	Whip	Unknown
03	Nationalist Congress Party	Group Leader	Aniket Tatkare
03	Nationalist Congress Party	Chief Whip	Shivaji Rao Garje
03	Nationalist Congress Party	Whip	Sanjay Khodke
04	Indian National Congress	Group Leader	Satej Patil
04	Indian National Congress	Chief Whip	Abhijit Wanjarri
04	Indian National Congress	Whip	Rajesh Rathod
05	Nationalist Congress Party (Sharadchandra Pawar)	Group Leader	Eknath Khadse
05	Nationalist Congress Party (Sharadchandra Pawar)	Chief Whip	Shashikant Shinde
05	Nationalist Congress Party (Sharadchandra Pawar)	Whip	Unknown
06	Shiv Sena (Uddhav Balasaheb Thackeray)	Group Leader	Anil Parab
06	Shiv Sena (Uddhav Balasaheb Thackeray)	Chief Whip	Sunil Shinde
06	Shiv Sena (Uddhav Balasaheb Thackeray)	Whip	Unknown

== Location ==
The seat of the Vidhan Parishad is situated at the Nariman Point area of South Mumbai in the capital Mumbai. The budget session and the monsoon session are convened in Mumbai whereas the winter session is convened in the auxiliary capital Nagpur.

== Composition of Legislative Council ==
Legislative Council shall consist of not less than 40 members or maximum one-third of the total number of members in the legislative assembly, chosen in the manner provided in this section.

1. 30 members shall be elected by the members of the Legislative Assembly.
2. 7 members are elected from amongst graduates from seven divisions of Maharashtra ( Mumbai, Amravati Division, Nashik Division, Aurangabad Division, Konkan Division, Nagpur Division and Pune Division)
3. 7 members are elected from amongst teachers from seven divisions of Maharashtra ( Mumbai, Amravati Division, Nashik Division, Aurangabad Division, Konkan Division, Nagpur Division and Pune Division)
4. 22 members are elected from amongst the local bodies of Maharashtra from 21 divisions of Maharashtra ( Mumbai (2 seats) and one seat each from Ahmednagar, Akola-cum-Washim-cum-Buldhana, Amravati, Aurangabad-cum-Jalna, Bhandara- Gondiya, Dhule-cum-Nandurbar, Jalgaon, Kolhapur, Nagpur, Nanded, Nashik, Osmanabad-cum-Latur-cum-Beed, Parbhani-Hingoli, Pune, Raigad-cum-Ratnagiri-cum-Sindhudurg, Sangli-cum-Satara, Solapur, Thane-cum-Palghar, Wardha-cum-Chandrapur-cum-Gadhchiroli and Yavatmal)
5. 12 members having special knowledge or practical experience in respect of matters such as literature, science, art, co-operative movement and social service shall be nominated by the Governor

It is a continuous House and not subject to dissolution. However, one-third of its members retire every second year and are replaced by new members. As such a member enjoys a tenure of six years. The members of the Vidhan Parishad elect its chairman and deputy chairman.

== Constituencies and Members (78) ==
Following are recent members of Maharashtra Legislative Council

=== Elected by the Legislative Assembly members (30) ===
Keys: BJP (16) SHS (6) NCP (4) SS(UBT) (2) INC (1) NCP-SP (1)

#	Member	Party	Term start	Term end
1	Pramod Jathar	BJP	14-May-2026	13-May-2032
2	Sunil Karjatkar	BJP	14-May-2026	13-May-2032
3	Sanjay Bhende	BJP	14-May-2026	13-May-2032
4	Madhavi Naik	BJP	14-May-2026	13-May-2032
5	Vivek Kolhe	BJP	14-May-2026	13-May-2032
6	Pankaja Munde	BJP	28-July-2024	27-July-2030
7	Yogesh Tilekar	BJP	28-July-2024	27-July-2030
8	Parinay Fuke	BJP	28-July-2024	27-July-2030
9	Amit Gorkhe	BJP	28-July-2024	27-July-2030
10	Sadabhau Khot	BJP	28-July-2024	27-July-2030
11	Pradnya Satav	BJP	12-May-2026	27-July-2030
12	Pravin Darekar	BJP	08-July-2022	07-July-2028
13	Ram Shinde	BJP	08-July-2022	07-July-2028
14	Shrikant Bharatiya	BJP	08-July-2022	07-July-2028
15	Prasad Lad	BJP	08-July-2022	07-July-2028
16	Uma Khapre	BJP	08-July-2022	07-July-2028
17	Bachchu Kadu	SHS	14-May-2026	13-May-2032
18	Neelam Gorhe	SHS	14-May-2026	13-May-2032
19	Krupal Tumane	SHS	28-July-2024	27-July-2030
20	Bhavana Gawali	SHS	28-July-2024	27-July-2030
21	Sachin Ahir	SHS	08-July-2022	07-July-2028
22	Chandrakant Raghuwanshi	SHS	20-Mar-2025	07-July-2028
23	Zeeshan Siddique	NCP	14-May-2026	13-May-2032
24	Shivaji Rao Garje	NCP	28-July-2024	27-July-2030
25	Sanjay Khodke	NCP	20-Mar-2025	27-July-2030
26	Ramraje Naik Nimbalkar	NCP	08-July-2022	07-July-2028
27	Ambadas Danve	SS(UBT)	14-May-2026	13-May-2032
28	Milind Narvekar	SS(UBT)	28-July-2024	27-July-2030
29	Bhai Jagtap	INC	08-July-2022	07-July-2028
30	Eknath Khadse	NCP(SP)	08-July-2022	07-July-2028

=== Elected from Local Authorities' constituencies (22) ===
Keys: BJP (14) SHS (3) NCP (2) SS(UBT) (1) INC (1) Independent (1)

#	Constituency	Member	Party	Term start	Term end
1	Mumbai	Sunil Shinde	SS(UBT)	02-Jan-2022	01-Jan-2028
2	Mumbai	Rajhans Singh	BJP	02-Jan-2022	01-Jan-2028
3	Dhule–Nandurbar	Amrish Patel	BJP	02-Jan-2022	01-Jan-2028
4	Nagpur	Rajeev Potdar	BJP	22-Jun-2026	01-Jan-2028
5	Akola–Washim–Buldhana	Vasant Khandelwal	BJP	02-Jan-2022	01-Jan-2028
6	Kolhapur	Satej Patil	INC	02-Jan-2022	01-Jan-2028
7	Chhatrapati Sambhaji Nagar -Jalna	Suhas Shirsath	BJP	22-Jun-2026	21-Jun-2032
8	Dharashiv–Latur–Beed	Basavraj Patil	BJP	22-Jun-2026	21-Jun-2032
9	Amravati	Pravin Pote	BJP	22-Jun-2026	21-Jun-2032
10	Wardha–Chandrapur–Gadhchiroli	Arun Lakhani	BJP	22-Jun-2026	21-Jun-2032
11	Nashik	Gokul Gite	Ind	22-Jun-2026	21-Jun-2032
12	Parbhani–Hingoli	Saeed Khan	SHS	22-Jun-2026	21-Jun-2032
13	Raigad–Ratnagiri–Sindhudurg	Aniket Tatkare	NCP	22-Jun-2026	21-Jun-2032
14	Jalgaon	Nandkishor Mahajan	BJP	22-Jun-2026	21-Jun-2032
15	Bhandara–Gondia	Avinash Bramhankar	BJP	22-Jun-2026	21-Jun-2032
16	Pune	Vikram Kakde	NCP	22-Jun-2026	21-Jun-2032
17	Sangli–Satara	Dhairyashil Kadam	BJP	22-Jun-2026	21-Jun-2032
18	Nanded	Amarnath Rajurkar	BJP	22-Jun-2026	21-Jun-2032
19	Yavatmal	Dushyant Chaturvedi	SHS	22-Jun-2026	21-Jun-2032
20	Thane–Palghar	Ravindra Phatak	SHS	22-Jun-2026	21-Jun-2032
21	Ahilayanagar	Prajakt Tanpure	BJP	22-Jun-2026	21-Jun-2032
22	Solapur	Rajendra Raut	BJP	22-Jun-2026	21-Jun-2032

=== Elected from Teachers constituencies (7) ===
Keys: BJP (2) SHS (2) NCP (1) SS(UBT) (1) Independent (1)

#	Constituency	Member	Party	Term start	Term end
1	Mumbai	Jagannath Abhyankar	SS(UBT)	08-Jul-2024	07-Jul-2030
2	Nashik	Kishor Darade	SHS	08-Jul-2024	07-Jul-2030
3	Konkan	Dnyaneshwar Mhatre	BJP	08-Feb-2023	07-Feb-2029
4	Chhatrapati Sambhajinagar	Vikram Kale	NCP	08-Feb-2023	07-Feb-2029
5	Nagpur	Sudhakar Adbale	Ind	08-Feb-2023	07-Feb-2029
6	Pune	Kaustubh Gawade	BJP	07-Dec-2026	06-Dec-2032
7	Amravati	Kiran Sarnaik	SHS	07-Dec-2026	06-Dec-2032

=== Elected from Graduates constituencies (7) ===
Keys: INC (2) BJP (1) SS(UBT) (1) NCP-SP (2) Independent (1)

#	Constituency	Member	Party	Term start	Term end
1	Konkan	Niranjan Davkhare	BJP	08-Jul-2024	07-Jul-2030
2	Mumbai	Anil Parab	SS(UBT)	08-Jul-2024	07-Jul-2030
3	Amravati	Dhiraj Lingade	INC	08-Feb-2023	07-Feb-2029
4	Nashik	Satyajeet Tambe	Ind	08-Feb-2023	07-Feb-2029
5	Nagpur	Abhijit Wanjarri	INC	07-Dec- 2026	06-Dec- 2032
6	Aurangabad	Pratapsinh Patil	NCP(SP)	07-Dec- 2026	06-Dec- 2032
7	Pune	Harshada Deshmukh Jadhav	NCP(SP)	07-Dec- 2026	06-Dec- 2032

=== Nominated by the Governor (12) ===
Keys: BJP (3) SHS (2) NCP (2) Vacant (5)

#	Member	Party	Term start	Term end
1	Chitra Wagh	BJP	16-Oct-2024	15-Oct-2030
2	Vikrant Patil	BJP	16-Oct-2024	15-Oct-2030
3	Babusingh Maharaj Rathod	BJP	16-Oct-2024	15-Oct-2030
4	Hemant Patil	SHS	16-Oct-2024	15-Oct-2030
5	Manisha Kayande	SHS	16-Oct-2024	15-Oct-2030
6	Pankaj Bhujbal	NCP	16-Oct-2024	15-Oct-2030
7	Idris Naikwadi	NCP	16-Oct-2024	15-Oct-2030
8				
9				
10				
11				
12				

== Officers ==
=== Chairperson ===
- Prof. Ram Shinde

=== Leader of the House ===
The council has a Leader of the House, who heads the government caucus. The office is provided for in the Legislative Council Rules, which defines it as "Chief Minister or any other Minister appointed by Chief Minister". The Rules further mandate that the chairperson should conduct parliamentary business in consultation with the Leader.

=== Deputy Leader of the House ===
The council has a Deputy Leader of the House, who heads the government caucus. The office is provided for in the Legislative Council Rules, which defines it as "Chief Minister or any other Minister appointed by Chief Minister". The Rules further mandate that the chairperson should conduct parliamentary business in consultation with the Leader.

=== Leader of the Opposition ===
- Vacant, since 29th August

== See also ==
- List of members of the Maharashtra Legislative Council
- Government of Maharashtra
- Maharashtra Legislative Assembly
- Vidhan Parishad
