= Tech Town =

Tech Town may refer to:

- Tech Town (Detroit) or TechTown, an urban research and technology business park in Detroit, Michigan
- Tech Town (Dayton), a technology district in Dayton, Ohio
- Tech Town or Tektown, an unreleased game for the Power Glove
- Tech Town, a fictional store in episodes of Lab Rats
- Tech Town (Greece), a technology repair and marketing center, Nea Makri, Marathon, Attiki, Greece
