= Phoenix Grand Victoria =

- Location: Alipore, Kolkata
- Manager: The Phoenix Mills Limited
- Floor area: 1 Million Sq. ft. (1st phase)
- Floors: 8
- Parking: 1834
- Website: www.phoenixmarketcity.com

Phoenix Grand Victoria is an under construction shopping mall being developed by Phoenix Mills Limited in Kolkata, West Bengal, India.

== Construction ==
The project was announced in 2021 while the construction started in 2023. The mall is planned to be based on a 7.48-acre area with having 1 million square feet retail area in its first phase.

Developed by Phoenix Mills and Canada Pension Plan Investment Board (CPPB), the mall is expected to bear a cost of ₹600 Crores. The mall is expected to be built by 2026.

== Interior and features ==
Along with retail shops the mall will contain multiplex, food court, gaming and entertainment space and wellness center. There will be 1,834 underground parking spaces.
