= Manchester of the East =

Manchester of the East is a nickname of:

== India ==
- Ahmedabad, Gujarat
- Faridabad, Haryana
- Kanpur, Uttar Pradesh
- Mumbai; see redevelopment of Mumbai mills
- Sualkuchi, Assam
- Jalgaon, Maharashtra

== Japan ==
- Osaka
