= Small Business Liability Relief and Brownfields Revitalization Act =

United States law enacted in 2002

- Long title: An Act to provide certain relief for small businesses from liability under the Comprehensive Environmental Response, Compensation, and Liability Act of 1980, and to amend such Act to promote the cleanup and reuse of brownfields, to provide financial assistance for brownfields revitalization, to enhance State response programs, and for other purposes.
- Nicknames: the Brownfields Law
- Enacted by: the 107th United States Congress

Citations
- Public law: Pub. L. 107–118 (text) (PDF)
- Statutes at Large: 115 Stat. 2356

Codification
- Acts amended: CERCLA

Legislative history
- Introduced in the House as H.R. 2869 on September 10, 2001; Committee consideration by Energy and Commerce, Transportation and Infrastructure; Passed the House on December 20, 2001 (Voice vote); Passed the Senate on December 20, 2001 (Unanimous consent); Signed into law by President George W. Bush on January 11, 2002

The Small Business Liability Relief and Brownfields Revitalization Act (Pub. L. 107–118 (text) (PDF), 115 stat. 2356, "the Brownfields Law") was signed into law by President George W. Bush on January 11, 2002. Brownfields are defined as, "A former industrial or commercial site where future use is affected by real or perceived environmental contamination." The Brownfields Law amended the Comprehensive Environmental Response, Compensation, and Liability Act (CERCLA or Superfund) by providing funds to assess and clean up brownfields, clarifying CERCLA liability protections, and providing funds to enhance state and tribal response programs. Other related laws and regulations impact brownfields cleanup and reuse through financial incentives and regulatory requirements.

== An Executive Take ==
The Small Business Liability Relief and Brownfields Revitalization Act was a response to the 1980 act entitled The Superfund, which forced industries to pay for their own toxic spills and general pollution. President Bush cited in his address, on January 11, 2002, that "American cities have many such eyesores; anywhere from 500,000 to a million brownfields are across our Nation." In turn, this bill was created to put an end to the excess regulations and litigations many entrepreneurs incur when revitalizing dilapidated fields.

== Benefits ==
This act allows cash poor parties financial assistance, settling for smaller payment amounts, and alternative payment methods. This act also allows parties with property adjacent to the brownfields—which may contain hazardous wastes that infect their real estate—relief from the stipulations they would have previously been accountable for. Additionally, the property owners whose groundwater is contaminated by erosion, upon passing the Act, are now exempt from installing remediation systems and having any further inspections. Previously responsible parties are now exempt from the Superfund's legislation. Innocent landowning parties can now be defended so long as they intend to fully cooperate with natural resource restoration, comply with restrictions on property, and not impede on the integrity of the ruling institution.

== Exemptions ==
Groups that are looking to dispose of less than 110 US gal (420 L; 92 imp gal) or 200 lb (91 kg) of hazardous waste are exempt from this act, so long as the disposal occurred before April 1, 2001. The National Priorities List, a branch of the Environmental Protection Agency (EPA), also states that groups operating with fewer than 100 full-time employees are also exempt from former Superfund agreements. Additionally, the president retains the ability to override any exemptions deemed necessary due to maltreatment of natural resources. The president may also override any failed requests that were submitted by previously responsible parties, or current landowners. In Section 221 of the act, anyone owning land adjacent to contaminated property that is releasing hazardous substances is also exempt from the stipulations previously required by The Superfund of 1980.

== Stipulations ==
Landowners, upon passing The Small Business Liability Relief and Brownsfield Revitalization Act, are responsible to proceed with an "all appropriate inquiry" in which they ask previous owners of the nature of the lands use. Additionally, to carry out an all appropriate inquiry, the current landowner must take the customary steps toward protecting human activity from the contaminated area on the property and salvaging any natural resources contaminated by the contamination. Finally, the act requires an EPA administrator to make known any contamination upon the property publicly available within two years from discovery.

== Funding ==
Two sources of funding were derived from Section 104(k) within Subtitle A and Section 128(a) within Subtitle C of this Act that establishes $250 Million per year for brownfields revitalization. Specifically, $200 million per year for brownfields assessment, cleanup, revolving loans, and environmental job training, and $50 million per year to assist State and Tribal response programs. The Environmental Protection Agency's Brownfields Program collaborates with other EPA programs, federal partners, and state agencies to identify and leverage resources that can be used for brownfields activities. These collaborations lead to a process of engagement reliant upon public–private partnerships to turn dilapidated properties into viable economic redevelopments or "green-space" throughout the country. Funding criteria include the extent to which the money will be used to protect human health, and the environment, spur redevelopment and create jobs, preserve open space and parks, represent a "fair" distribution between urban and rural areas, address "sensitive populations", and involve the local community.

== Land Revitalization ==
Due to the issuance of the Comprehensive Environmental Response Compensation and Liability Act (CERCLA/Superfund) signed 1980 and subsequent court decisions imposing cleanup liability on a wide range of entities involved with a contaminated property, people began to avoid the redevelopment, reuse, and revitalization of properties identified with previous commercial or industrial business practices. One of the most significant hurdles cities, communities, and private sector players face when trying to acquire and redevelop contaminated property is the lack of capital to provide essential early-stage activities such as site assessment, remediation, response action, and cleanup. This Act provides a solution to those hurdles by providing increased funding for site evaluation and cleanup, Superfund liability reform and brownfields liability clarifications, and new limitations on EPA authority as it relates to state response programs.

=== Project Cycle Description ===
The life cycle of a brownfield project begins when an eligible entity identifies a brownfield property in its community and also identifies the community's redevelopment needs and goals. This property then undergoes an All Appropriate Inquiry or Environmental Site Assessment to assess the potential liability associated. If a recognized environmental concern is found, the extent of historical contamination associated with the property is assessed. Once the extent of historical contamination is delineated in all directions, the site undergoes remediation to make the land protective of human health and the environment. When the cleanup of a site is accomplished, the property is ready for redevelopment or revitalization. If no liabilities or recognized environmental concerns are found within the All Appropriate Inquiry or Environmental Site Assessment the property can skip the assessment and remediation stages within the project cycle and go directly to redevelopment.

=== Public-Private Partnership through Brownfields Redevelopment ===
Public–private partnerships have been defined as long-term relationships between fundamentally different sectors that are focused on the development of infrastructure required for rendering of services and a more effective rendering of public services, seeking to ensure social economic development at national, regional and local levels. The Small Business Liability Relief and Brownfields Revitalization Act has created a new platform for multi-sector collaboration by creating a process of engagement between entities. A mechanism within this platform includes state response program grants authorized by CERCLA Section 128(a)(1) that seek to protect human health and the environment by encouraging the voluntary investigation and cleanup of properties by establishing memorandum of agreements/understandings with state environmental authorities. When a brownfields site is in a state response program, the responsible party is protected from enforcement. This protection and the available resources to provide environmental site assessments and limited cleanups are the attributes that encourage the revitalization of historic sites with an industrial past. In Texas, the Texas Commission on Environmental Quality (TCEQ) has a Voluntary Cleanup Program (VCP) that provides administrative, technical, and legal incentives to participants for investigation, cleanup, and redevelopment.

==== Discovery Green ====
In 2004, a public-private partnership to secure a site in downtown Houston, Texas was formed by the Brown Foundation, the Kinder Foundation, the Wortham Foundation, the Houston Endowment, Inc., and the City of Houston to create the Discovery Green Conservancy. This group envisioned turning an undeveloped and underused parking lot with a long history of industrial occupants into a downtown city park. The Discovery Green Conservancy is a private nonprofit organization formed to raise funds, operate and care for this park.

Typically, sights with an industrial past equate to environmental issues. The affected property assessment of this site revealed soils impacted by metals and petroleum hydrocarbons, and groundwater impacted by volatile organic compounds. To remediate this site, impacted soils were properly disposed of at an offsite permitted recycling facility and groundwater was treated with an in-situ bioremediation microorganisms. When the site was remediated to be protective of human health and the environment, it received a VCP Certificate of Completion and construction on the park began.

Discovery Green is a 12-acre park in the heart of downtown Houston that opened to the public in April 2008. The total cost to acquire the land that became Discovery Green was approximately $57 million, and the total cost to build, landscape, and complete the project was approximately $125 million. Since opening in 2008, the park has helped drive convention activity and has served as a catalyst for $625 million in downtown development.

=== Ongoing Issues ===
The Small Business Liability Relief and Brownfields Revitalization Act exemplifies collaborative approaches to encourage voluntary environmental improvements, an increasingly prominent alternative to traditional regulatory models of environmental protection. However, issues such as the stigmatization of sites, limited amount of awarded grant funds, and disparity in award funding are common hurdles the Brownfields policy currently faces. To resolve these issues the Brownfields Utilization, Investment, and Local Development (BUILD) Act of 2013 was introduced to the 113 Congress on March 7, 2013. This Act proposes to expand eligibility, increase funding for remediation grants, and give priority to small communities including Indian Tribes, rural and low-income areas with a population of less than 15,000.
