= Girangaon =

Area in Mumbai, India

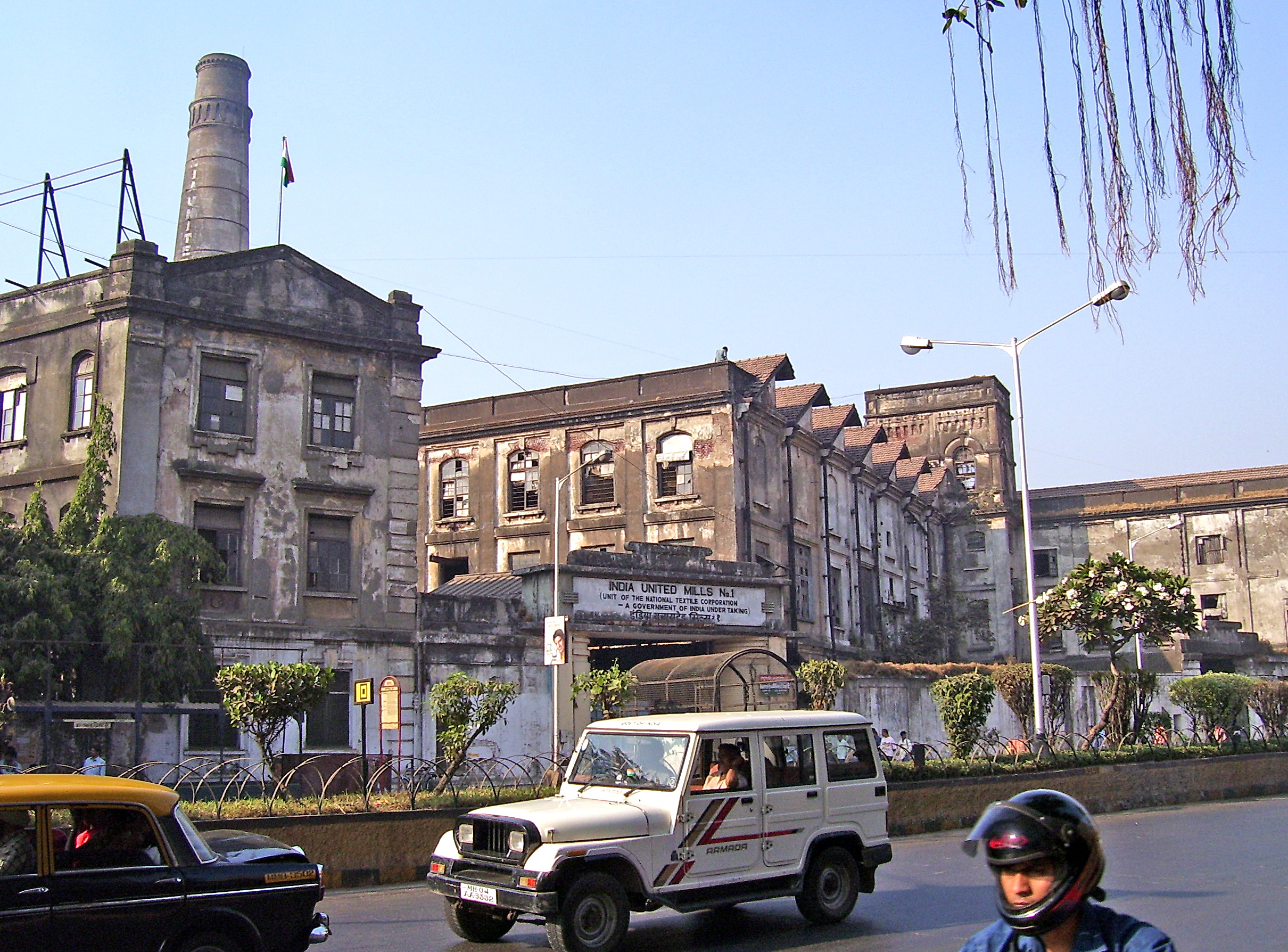
India United Mill, Parel – one of the larger mills, and also one of the few to be owned by the government

Girangaon (literally "mill village") was a name of an area now part of central Mumbai, India, which at one time had almost 130 textile mills, with the majority being cotton mills. The mills of Girangaon contributed significantly to the prosperity and growth of Mumbai during the later nineteenth century and for the transformation of Mumbai into a major industrial metropolis. Girangaon covered an area of 600 acres (2.4 km^{2}), not including the workers' housing. The mill workers lived in a community, and they fostered a unique culture which shaped Mumbai at the turn of the twentieth century. This textile industry flourished until the early 2000s after which most of the mills were shut down, as the owners deemed them unprofitable and declared they were incapable of paying their workers' wages.

== Origins ==
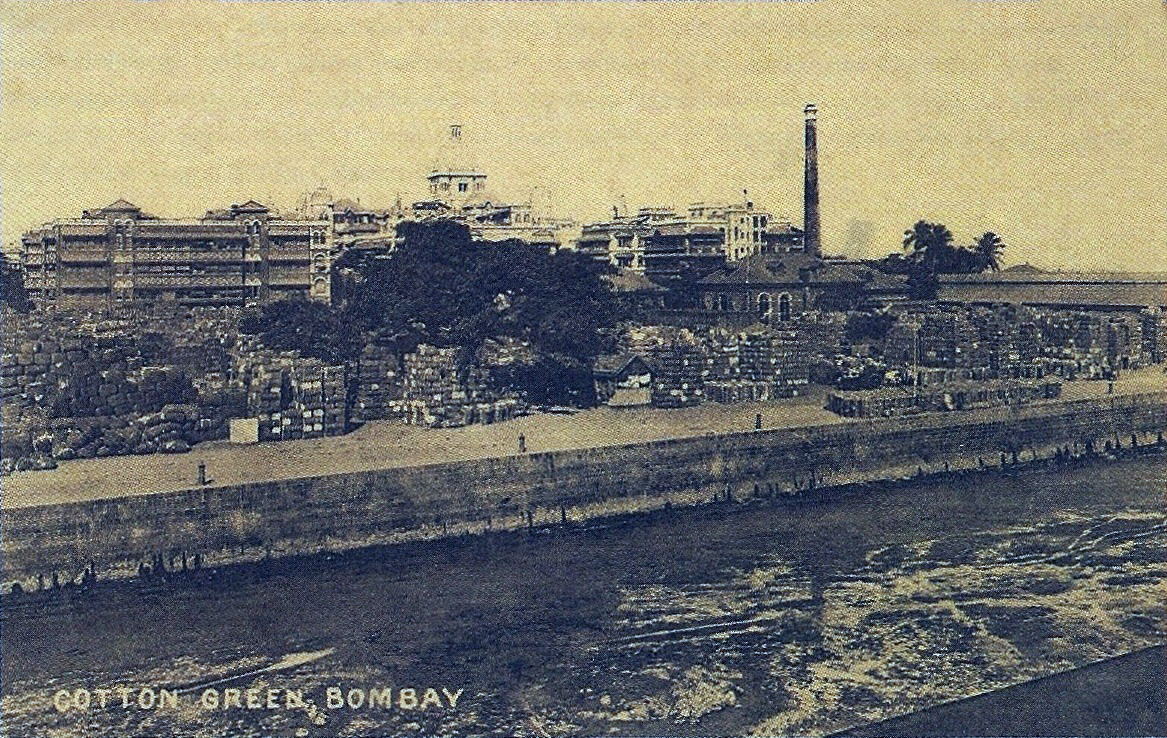
Cotton green mills, c. 1910 in front of the Taj Mahal Hotel, Colaba

The Bombay Spinning and Weaving Company was the first cotton mill to be set up in Tardeo, Mumbai, in 1856. A boom in the textile industry followed, with 10 cotton mills set up in Mumbai by 1865, employing over 6,500 workers. A gradual increase led to a total of 136 mills being set up by 1900. The textile industry was offered added government incentives in the form of long-term leases (some of 999 years), as mills stimulated the economic growth and employment.

These mills were owned by former traders like the Tatas, Petits, Wadias, Currimbhoys, Thakerseys, Sassoons, Khataus, Goculdas, Cottons, and Greaves. Most of the mill workers came from areas around Mumbai - Kolis were particularly represented. The mill owners housed their workers in chawls built in the areas of Tardeo, Byculla, Mazgaon, Reay Road, Lalbaug, Parel, Naigaum, Sewri, Worli and Prabhadevi. These areas gradually came to be known collectively as Girangaon (literally "the village of mills").

== Life in Girangaon ==
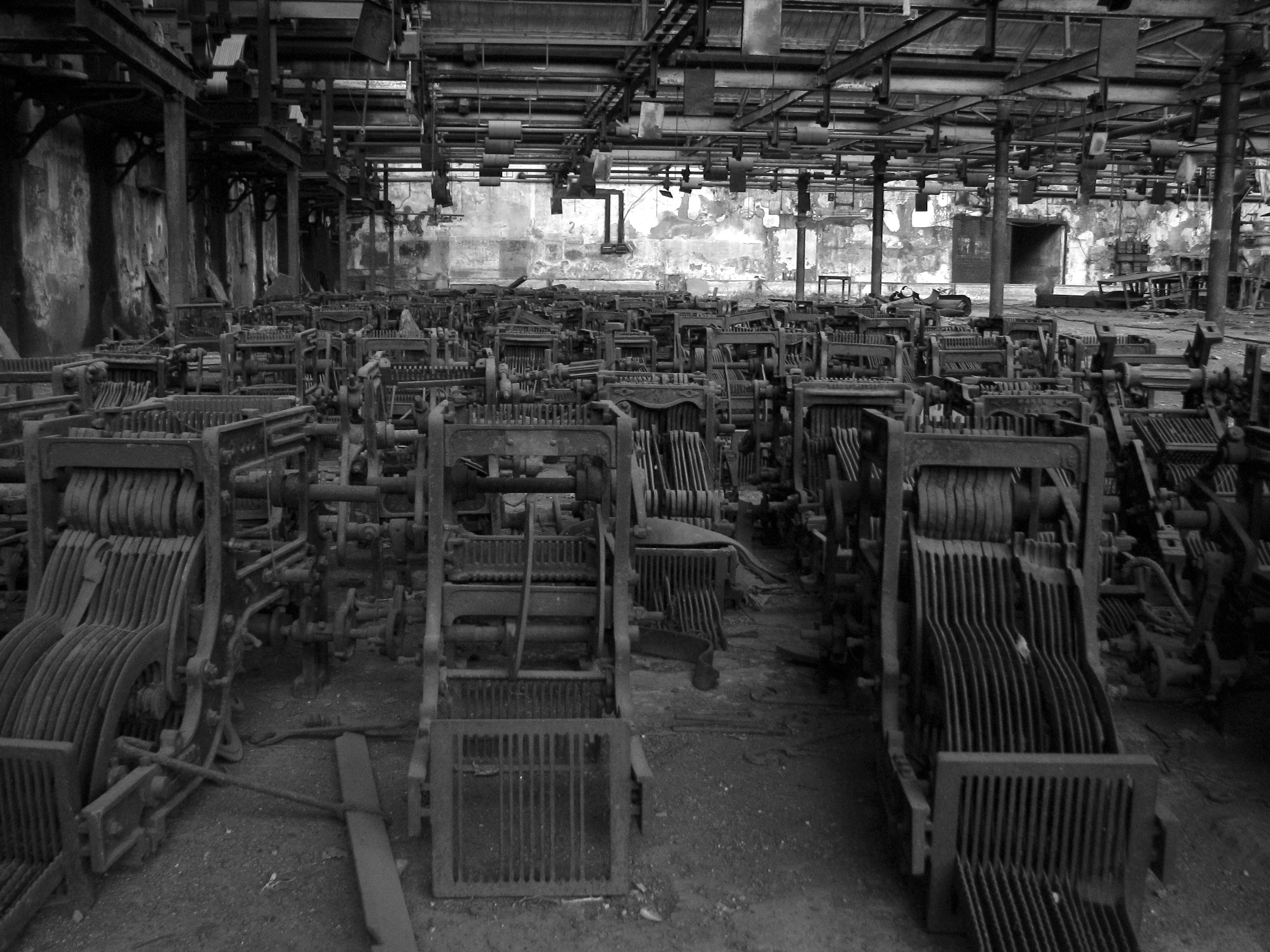
Abandoned machinery at Madhusudan mills, Lower Parel

Both men and women worked in the mills. They would start working there at a young age (some as young as 16), and worked 12 hours a day (from sunrise to sunset) until the passing of the Factories Act 1847 restricted the working day to 10 hours. When the Great Bombay Textile Strike was declared in 1982 by Datta Samant, there were an estimated 240,000 workers in Girangaon.

90% of the population who worked at the mills lived within a 15-minute walking distance of them. Most of the buildings were chawls; a survey conducted in Parel in 1921 determined that 27% of the population in Parel lived in rooms with six or more people. These chawls were built by both the government and the mill owners, but neither paid much attention to the quality of the housing. In 1929, one chawl in Dadar was described as being a "dark, unwholesome den into which the light of day does not penetrate and which of necessity breeds disease and pestilence." Often the rooms did not have adequate ventilation, and the lack of lavatory and washing facilities distressed the women in particular. The windows were kept closed to keep out the stench of the gutters and to keep dirty water from flowing into the house during the monsoon season.

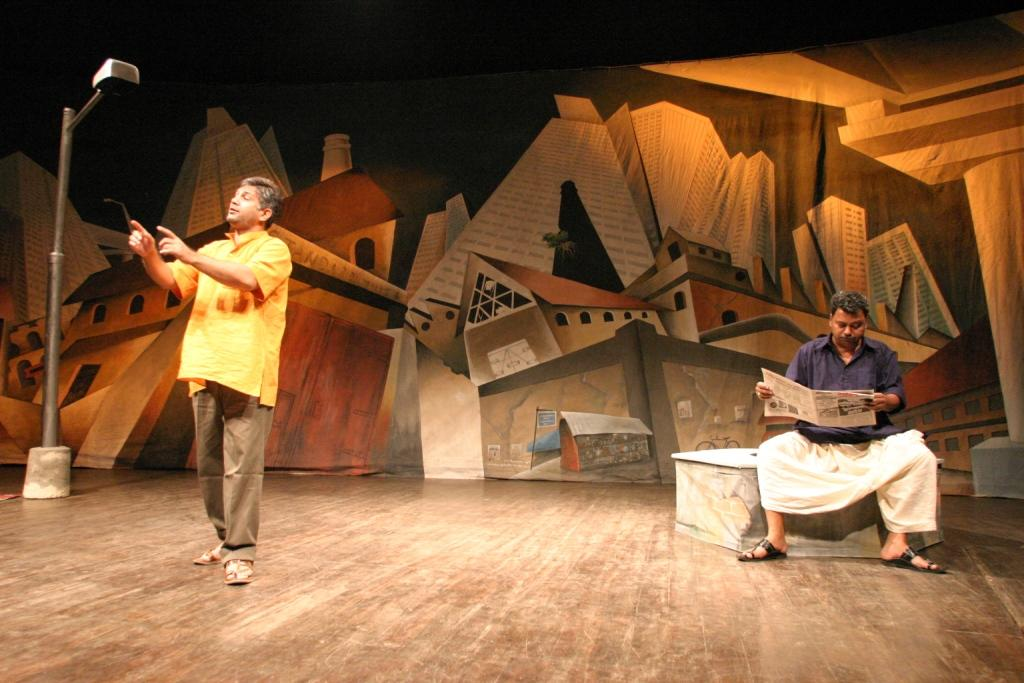
Scene from a popular 2007 play "Cotton 56 Polyester 84" by Sunil Shanbag about life in Girangaon

Due to this overcrowding, the distinction between home and street was blurred; Girangaon residents spent more of their time on the street than in the home. There was great participation in communal festivals like Moharram, Ganesh Chaturthi and Gokulashtami. Local shop keepers and mill owners were often coerced into contributing to such festivals, and adjoining localities competed with each other in the grandness of their contributions. The local liquor shop or gymnasium was a common meeting place. The workers of Girangaon patronized arts like poetry, theatre and dance (tamasha). Several notable actors first found fame here.

== Peak and decline ==
At their peak in 1980, the mills employed 300,000 workers. Indian cinema of the 1980s and 1990s frequently drew themes from the life of the mill workers. However, the mills were permanently closed after the Great Bombay Textile Strike of 1982, which went on for 18 months at many mills and triggered the end of the struggling industry, with most of the mills being shut down after the strike. By 2007, only 25,000 people worked in the few remaining mills.

== Redevelopment ==
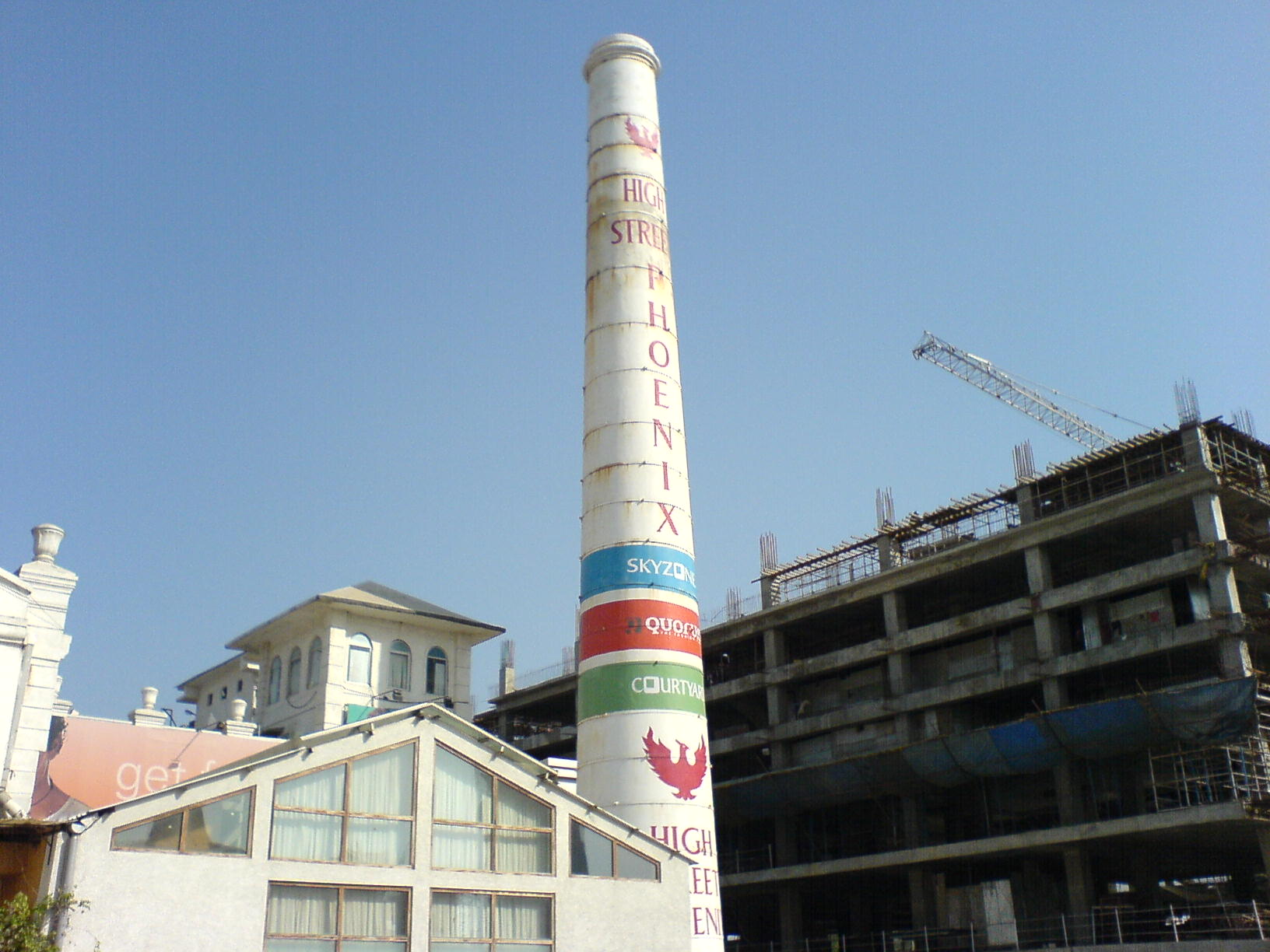
Phoenix Mills, Parel, which is now a shopping mall

In recent years, the mills have been extensively redeveloped, many becoming malls and discothèques. The Kohinoor Mills in Dadar were bought for ₹4.21 billion (US$44 million) by Matoshree Realtors and Kohinoor Consolidated Transport Network Ltd., companies which were floated by Raj Thackeray and Manohar Joshi respectively. Phoenix mills, Parel was converted into a "luxury mall".

In 2005, the government-owned National Textile Corporation auctioned five mills, covering 600 acres, for ₹20.2 billion (US$210 million). In February 2009, the NTC decided to auction another nine mills, covering an area of 90 acres, for about ₹40 billion (US$420 million). The Shrinivas Mills of Lalbaug, covering 16 acres, are being redeveloped into World One – Asia's tallest residential building.

=== Conservation ===
There are conservation efforts underway to preserve the old mills as museums. Such a museum was opened at the United Mills in Lalbaug. A popular play, Cotten 54, Polyester 64, has been written, based on Neera Adarkar and Meena Menon's book, One hundred years, One hundred voices. The Millworkers of Girangaon: An Oral History. A festival was organized by an NGO Pukar to celebrate the culture and people of Girangaon in November 2008. Seven mill structures were granted heritage protection status by the Government of Maharashtra.

== See also ==
- Redevelopment of Mumbai mills
- History of Mumbai

== Bibliography ==
- D'Monte, Darryl (December 2006). Mills for Sale. Mumbai, India: Marg Publications. ISBN 81-85026-77-7.
- Chandavarkar, Rajnarayan (1994). The Origins of Industrial Capitalism in India. Cambridge: Cambridge University Press. ISBN 0-521-41496-2.
- Chandavarkar, Rajnarayan (1998). Imperial power and popular politics (Illustrated ed.). Cambridge University Press. ISBN 0-521-59692-0.
