= Parel =

Parel Paraḷ
- Neighbourhood
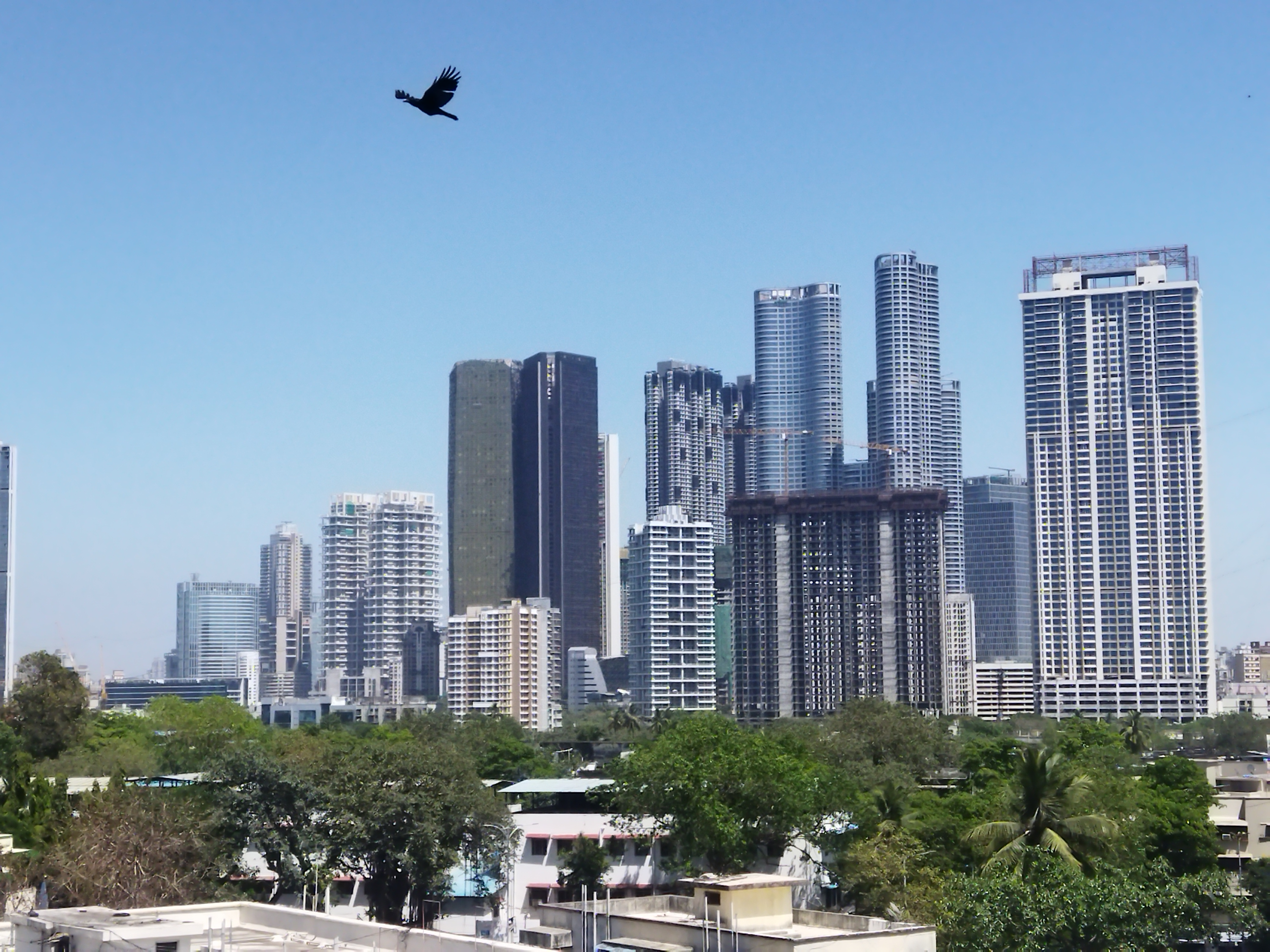
- A view of Lower Parel's skyline

- Location within Mumbai
- Coordinates: 18°59′54.4″N 72°50′31.054″E
- Country: India
- State: Maharashtra
- District: Mumbai City
- City: Mumbai
- Demonym(s): Parelkar, Paralkar

Language
  - Official: Marathi
- Time zone: UTC+5:30 (IST)
- PIN: 400012
- Area code: 022
- Civic agency: BMC
- Lok Sabha constituency: Mumbai South
- Vidhan Sabha constituency: Worli; Shivadi

Parel (ISO: Paraḷ, pronunciation: [pəɾəɭ]) is a neighbourhood in the south of Mumbai, Maharashtra, India. Originally one of the Seven Islands of Bombay, Parel became an industrial center after the unification of the islands of Bombay. Parel housed a large number of textile mills, but has gradually evolved into a business district, as most mills have been replaced by commercial office spaces and high-rise residential development.

== History ==
Former seven islands of Bombay.

Originally, Parel was a separate island, one of the Seven Islands of Bombay.

The Parel Relief or (Parel Shiva) is an important monolithic relief of the Hindu god Shiva in seven forms. It is dated back to the late Gupta period, in the 5th or 6th century AD by the ASI. It was found in Parel when a road was being constructed in 1931, and moved to the nearby Baradevi Temple, where it remains in worship, in its own room. The name Parel has its roots from the Parali Vaijanath Mahadev temple dedicated to Lord Shiva.

An inscription dated 26 January 1187 (Paurnima of Magha, Saka 1108) is found there. It records a grant made by Shilahara king Aparaditya II out of the proceeds of an orchard in a village named Mahavali (close to Kurla) for a Vaidyanatha temple.

In 1771 William Hornby, the Governor of Bombay, moved into the former friary, which became known as Government House, and a number of mills were subsequently established nearby. In 1883, the Governor's wife died of cholera in the house and two years later, the Governor's Mansion was moved to Malabar Point. During the plague epidemics of the 1890s, the old Government House was leased to the newly founded Haffkine Institute.

It was a district in Girangaon, which was the focus of the Great Bombay textile strike of 1982.

== Politics ==
Parel was a Vidhan Sabha constituency of Maharashtra from 1962 to 2004. It was constituted into the Shivadi constituency by the Delimitation of Parliament and Assembly Constituencies Order of 2008. The constituency was part of the Mumbai region and represented the Parel area, which has historically been an important industrial and residential locality of the city.

== Gallery ==
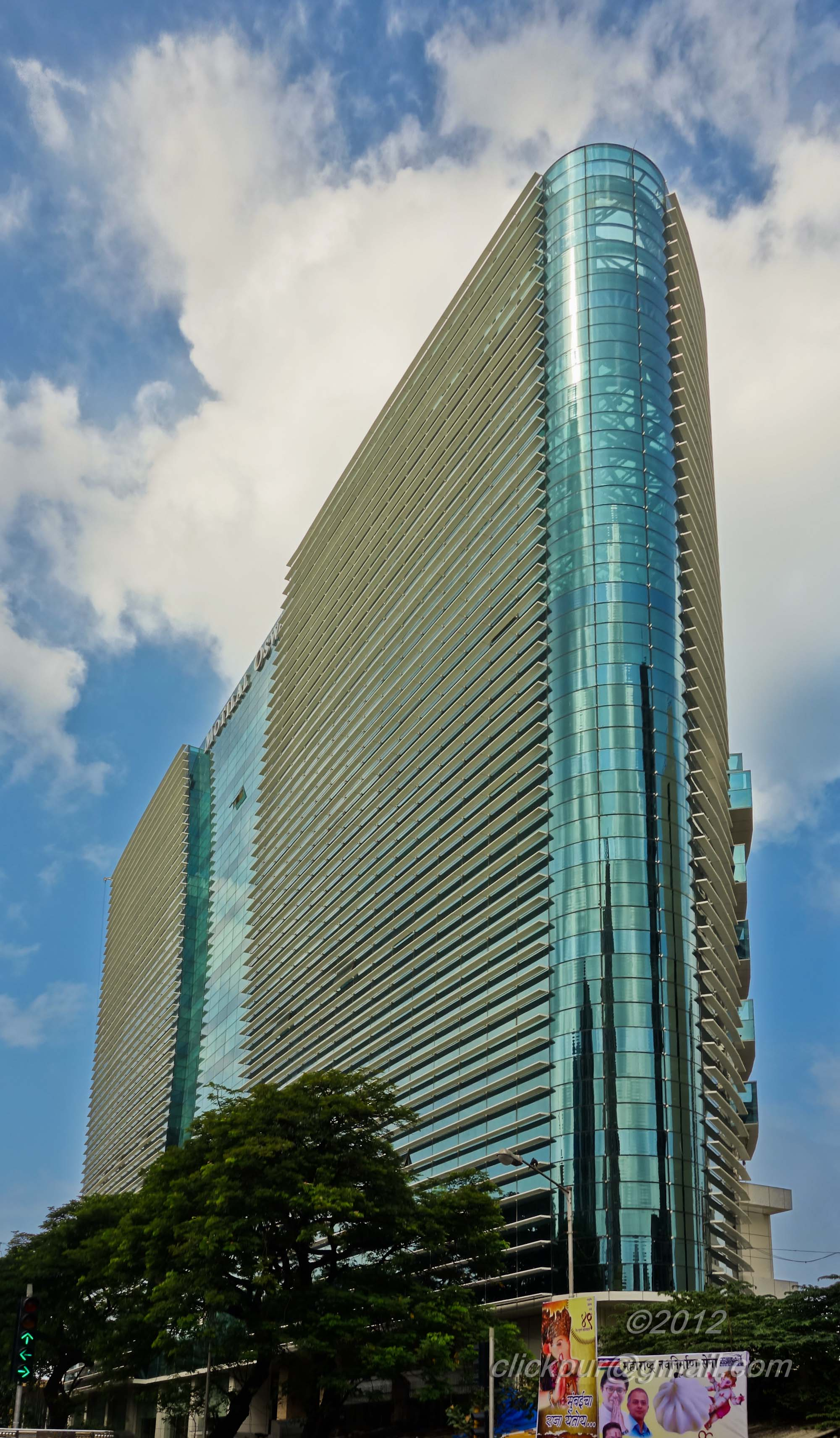
Motilal Oswal building

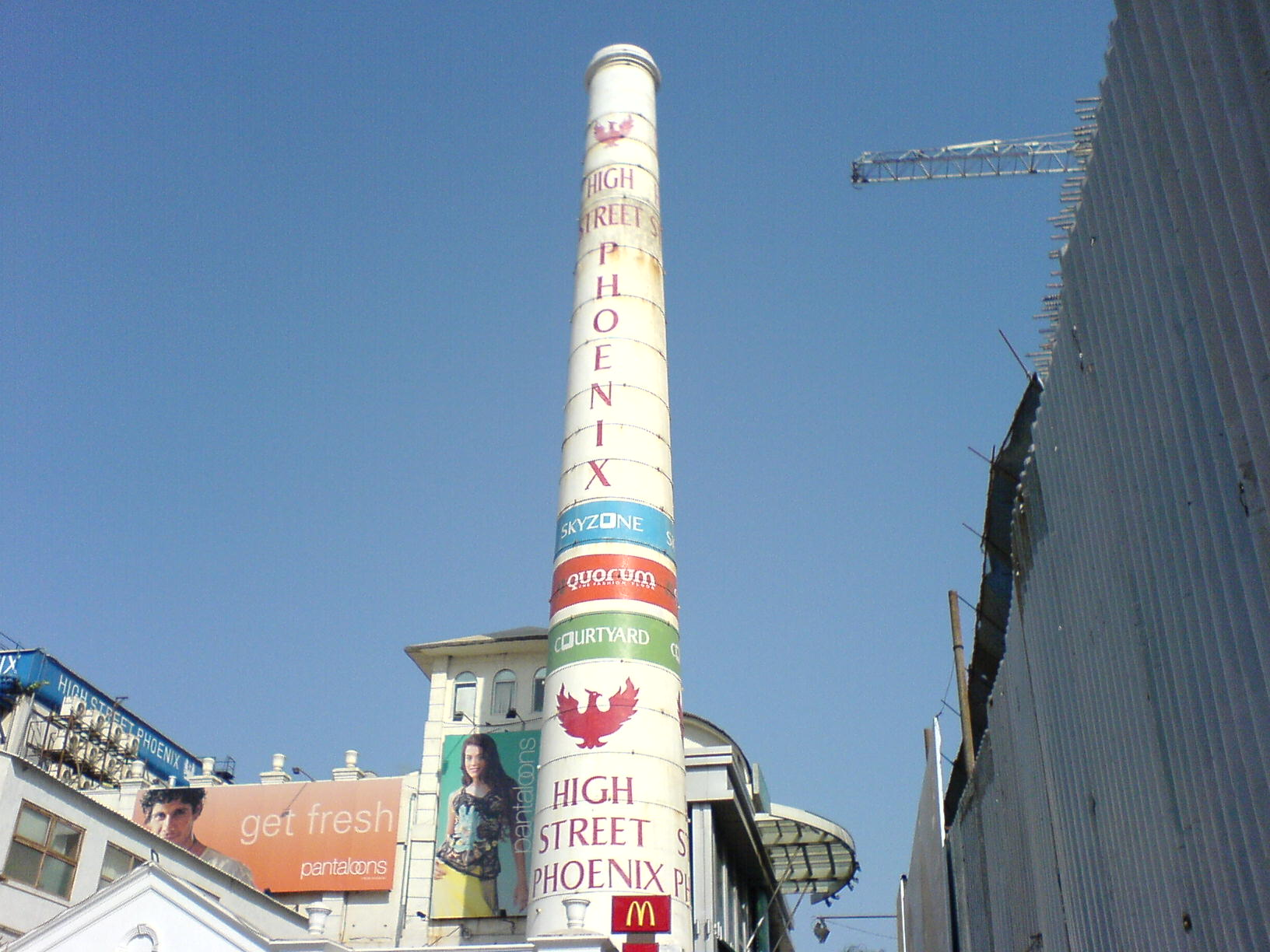
Phoenix Mills chimney

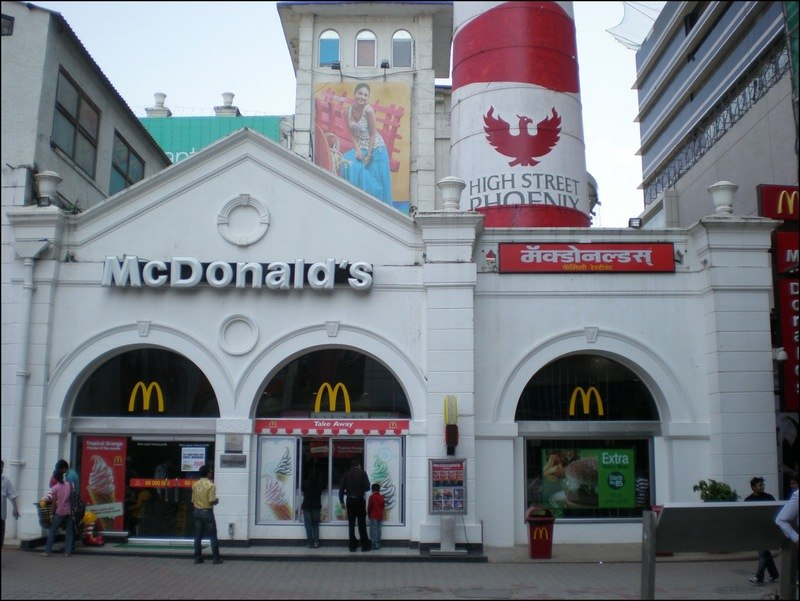
High Street Phoenix

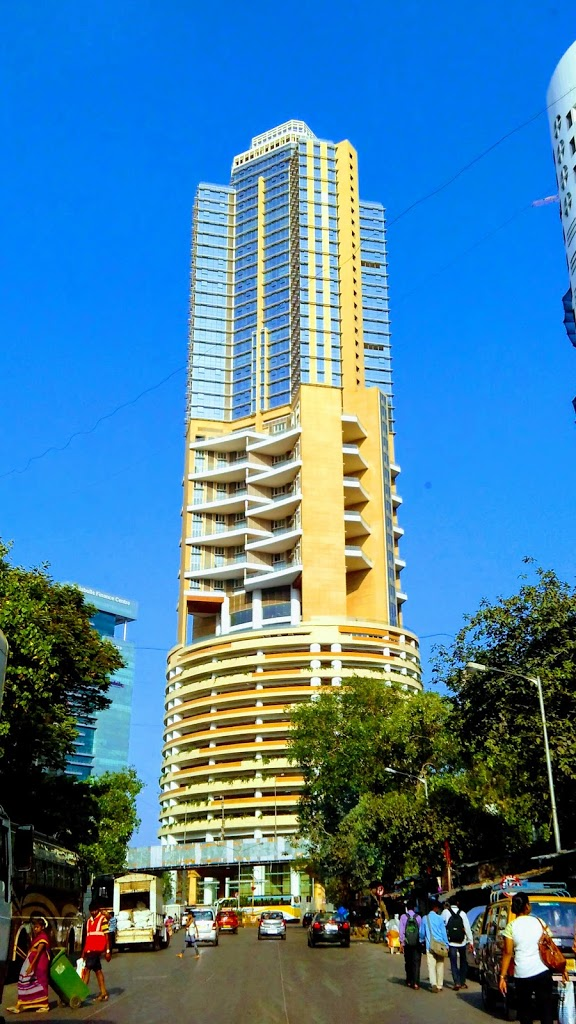
Indiabulls Sky Tower
