= Ramnarain Ruia =

Indian businessperson

Seth Ramnarain Ruia
- Born: c. 1860s India
- Died: c. 1930s (69-72)
- Other names: Ramnarain Harnandrai
- Occupation: Businessperson
- Known for: Founder of Phoenix Mills Limited and founder of Bank of India
- Spouse: Suvrata Devi
- Children: 5
- Father: Harnandrai Ruia

Seth Ramnarain Ruia (also known as Ramnarain Hurnundrai) was an Indian businessperson. He is also referred as the Cotton King.

He was one of the co-founders of Bank of India along with Sir Sassoon David and Sir Cowasji Jehangir Readymoney. Ramnarain Ruia College, a college located in Mumbai, is named after him.

== Life and career ==
He was born around the 1860s. In 1883, Ramnarain became a broker to the opium department of Sassoon J. David, the well-known Armenian firm in Bombay. In 1891, he became a guaranteed broker to Sassoon J. David's cotton department.

In 1905, Ruia purchased Phoenix Mills and two other mills in 1905 to start his textiles business. The other two mills, which he had purchased was the Bradbury Mills at Kalbadevi) and the Dawn Mills at Lower Parel in Bombay.

In 1959, the firm was listed on the Bombay Stock Exchange. The firm also ventured into real estate in 1987 and built High Street Phoenix, Mumbai. He co-founded Bank of India in 1906.
