= Brownfield land =

Previously developed land, often contaminated

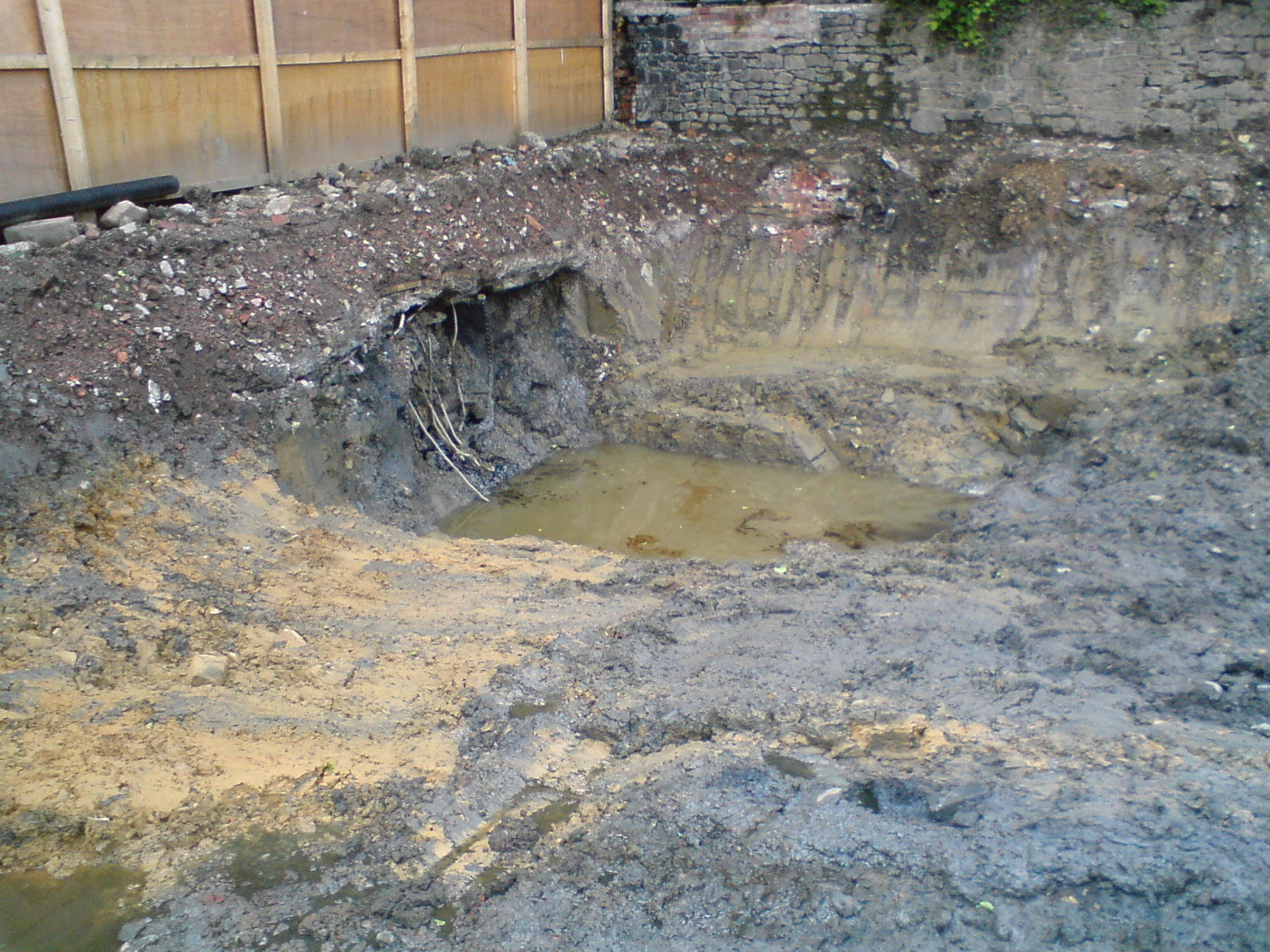
Example of brownfield land after excavation at a disused gasworks site, with soil contamination from removed underground storage tanks

Brownfield land is previously developed land that has been abandoned or left underused, and which may carry pollution or a risk of pollution from previous industrial use. The definition varies and is decided by policy makers and land developers within different countries. The main difference in definitions of whether a piece of land is considered a brownfield or not depends on the presence or absence of pollution. Overall, brownfield land is a site previously developed for industrial or commercial purposes and thus requires further development before reuse.

Examples of post industrial brownfield sites include abandoned factories, ash ponds, landfills, dry cleaning establishments, and gas stations. Typical contaminants include hydrocarbon spillages, solvents and pesticides, asbestos, and heavy metals like lead.

Many contaminated post-industrial brownfield sites sit unused because the cleaning costs may be more than the land is worth after redevelopment. Previously unknown underground wastes can increase the cost for study and cleanup. Depending on the contaminants and damage present adaptive re-use and disposal of a brownfield can require advanced and specialized appraisal analysis techniques.

== Definition ==
=== Canada ===
The Federal Government of Canada defines brownfields as "abandoned, idle or underused commercial or industrial properties [typically located in urban areas] where past actions have caused environmental contamination, but which still have potential for redevelopment or other economic opportunities."

=== United States ===
The U.S. Environmental Protection Agency (EPA) defined brownfield as a property where expansion, redevelopment or reuse may be complicated by the presence or potential presence of a hazardous substance, pollutant or contaminant. This comports well with an available general definition of the term, which scopes to "industrial or commercial property".

The term brownfield first came into use on June 28, 1992, at a U.S. congressional field hearing hosted by the Northeast Midwest Congressional Coalition. Also in 1992, the first detailed policy analysis of the issue was convened by the Cuyahoga County, Ohio Planning Commission. EPA selected Cuyahoga County as its first brownfield pilot project in September 1993. The term applies more generally to previously used land or to sections of industrial or commercial facilities that are to be upgraded.

In 2002, President George W. Bush signed the Small Business Liability Relief and Brownfields Revitalization Act (the "Brownfields Law") which provides grants and tools to local governments for the assessment, cleanup, and revitalization of brownfields as well as unique technical and program management experience, and public and environmental health expertise to individual brownfield communities. The motivation for this act was the success of the EPA's brownfields program, which it started in the 1990s in response to several court cases that caused lenders to redline contaminated property for fear of liability under the Superfund. As of September 2023, the EPA estimates that the EPA Brownfields program has resulted in 134,414 acres of land readied for reuse.

Mothballed brownfields are properties that the owners are not willing to transfer or put to productive reuse.

Brownfield status is a legal designation which places restrictions, conditions or incentives on redevelopment and use on the site.

=== United Kingdom ===
In the United Kingdom, brownfield land and previously developed land (PDL) have the same definition under the National Planning Policy Framework (NPPF). The government of the United Kingdom refers to them both as: "Land which is or was occupied by a permanent structure, including the curtilage of the developed land (although it should not be assumed that the whole of the curtilage should be developed) and any associated fixed surface infrastructure."

They exclude land that: "is or has been occupied by agricultural or forestry buildings; has been developed for minerals extraction or waste disposal by landfill purposes where provision for restoration has been made through development control procedures; land in built-up areas such as private residential gardens, parks, recreation grounds and allotments; and land that was previously developed but where the remains of the permanent structure or fixed surface structure have blended into the landscape in the process of time."

== Locations and contaminants ==
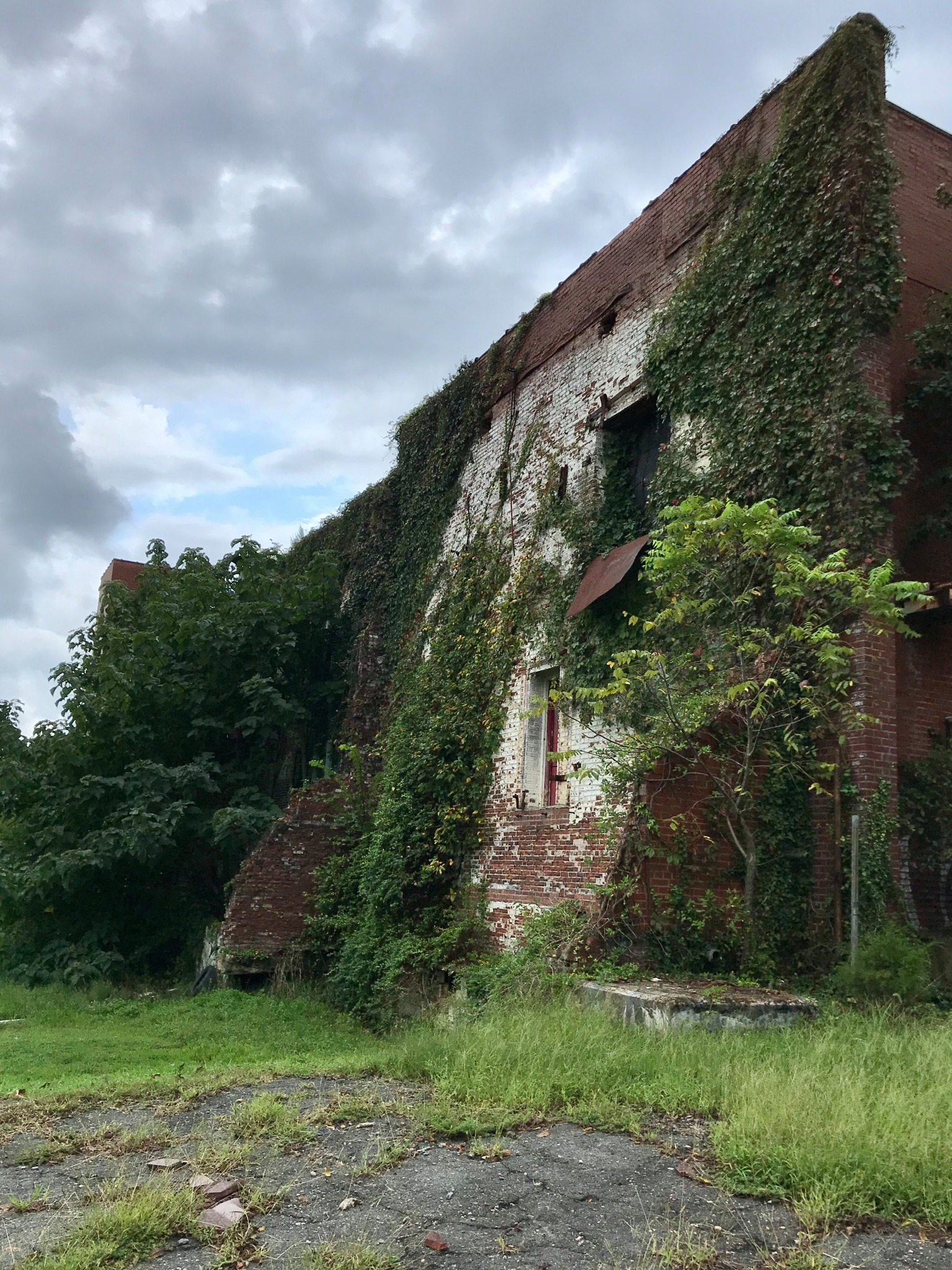
An abandoned factory, an example of what may be considered brownfield land

Generally, post industrial brownfield sites exist in a city's or town's industrial section, on locations with abandoned factories or commercial buildings, or other previously polluting operations like steel mills, refineries or landfills.

Small brownfields also may be found in older residential neighborhoods, as for example dry cleaning establishments or gas stations produced high levels of subsurface contaminants.

Typical contaminants found on contaminated brownfield land include hydrocarbon spillages, solvents, pesticides, heavy metals such as lead (e.g., paints), tributyl tins, and asbestos. Old maps may assist in identifying areas to be tested.

== Brownfield status by country ==
The primary issue facing all nations involved in attracting and sustaining new uses to brownfield sites is globalization of industry. This directly affects brownfield reuse, such as limiting the effective economic life of the use on the revitalized sites.

=== Canada ===
Canada has an estimated 200,000 "contaminated sites" across the nation. As of 2016, Canada had about 23,078 federally recognized contamination sites, from abandoned mines, to airports, lighthouse stations, and military bases, which are classified into N 1, 2, or 3, depending on a score of contamination, with 5,300 active contaminated sites, 2,300 suspected sites and 15,000 listed as closed because remediated or no action was necessary.

The provincial governments have primary responsibility for brownfields. The provinces' legal mechanisms for managing risk are limited, as there are no tools such as "No Further Action" letters to give property owners finality and certainty in the cleanup and reuse process. Yet, Canada has cleaned up sites and attracted investment to contaminated lands such as the Moncton rail yards. A strip of the Texaco lands in Mississauga is slated to be part of the Waterfront Trail. However, Imperial Oil has no plans to sell the 75-acre (30 ha) property which has been vacant since the 1980s.

According to their 2014 report on federally listed contaminated sites, the Parliamentary Budget Officer estimated that the "total liability for remediating Canada's contaminated sites reported in the public accounts [was] $4.9 billion." The report listed significant sites called the Big Five with a liability of $1.8 billion: Faro Mine, Colomac Mine, Giant Mine, Cape Dyer-DEW line and Goose Bay Air Base. The Port Hope, Ontario site has a liability of $1 billion. Port Hope has the largest volume of historic low-level radioactive wastes in Canada, resulting from "radium and uranium processing in Port Hope between 1933 and 1988 by the former Crown corporation Eldorado Nuclear Limited and its private sector predecessors. By 2010 it was projected that it would cost well over a billion dollars for the soil remediation project, it was the largest such cleanup in Canadian history. The effort is projected to be complete in 2022. In July 2015 the $87 million contract "to relocate the historic low-level radioactive waste and marginally contaminated soils from an existing waste management facility on the shoreline of Lake Ontario to the new, state-of-the-art facility about a kilometre north of the current site." was undertaken. There is also "$1.8 billion for general inventory sites" and "$200 million for other sites." The same report claimed the inventory currently lists 24,990 contaminated sites."

The federal government exercises some control over environmental protection, the "provincial and territorial governments issue the bulk of legislation regarding contaminated sites." Under the Shared-Responsibility Contaminated Sites Policy Framework (2005), the government may provide funding for the remediation of nonfederal sites, if the contamination is related to federal government activities or national security. (See Natural Resources Canada (2012).)

=== Denmark ===
While Denmark lacks the large land base which creates the magnitude of brownfield issues facing countries such as Germany and the U.S., brownfield sites in areas critical to the local economies of Denmark's cities require sophisticated solutions and careful interaction with affected communities. Examples include the cleanup and redevelopment of former and current ship building facilities along Copenhagen's historic waterfront. Laws in Denmark require a higher degree of coordination of planning and reuse than is found in many other countries.

=== France ===
In France, brownfields are called friches industrielles and the Ministère de l'Écologie, du Développement Durable et de l'Énergie (MEDDE) maintains a database of polluted sites named BASOL, with "more than 4,000 sites", of about 300,000 to 400,000 potentially polluted sites total (around 100,000 ha), in a historical inventory named BASIAS, maintained by the Agence de l'Environnement et de la Maitrise de l'Energie (ADEME).

=== Iran ===
In Iran, brownfields are primarily associated with former industrial and military sites established during the modernization of the Pahlavi era. Many industrial brownfields consist of small urban factories and workshops, particularly textile and food-processing facilities, while military sites have increasingly been relocated to suburban areas as a result of urban expansion and government policies. Due to historical development, many of these sites contain significant architectural, social, and industrial heritage. Brownfield redevelopment in Iran is constrained by the absence of legal definition, inadequate environmental regulations, and economic instability.

=== Hong Kong ===
Developing brownfield land is considered by the public as one of the most popular ways to increase housing in Hong Kong. The Liber Research Community has found 1,521 hectares of brownfield land in Hong Kong, and has found that almost 90% of existing uses of the land could easily be moved into multi-story buildings, freeing up land that could be used efficiently for housing. In June 2021, Liber Research Community and Greenpeace East Asia collaborated and found a new total of 1,950 hectares of brownfield sites, 379 more hectares than the government was previously able to locate.

=== Germany ===
Germany loses greenfields at a rate of about 1.2 square kilometres per day for settlement and transportation infrastructure. Each of the approximately 14,700 local municipalities is empowered to allocate lands for industrial and commercial use. Local control over reuse decisions of German brownfield sites (Industriebrache) is a critical factor. Industrial sites tend to be remote due to zoning laws, and incur costly overhead for providing infrastructure such as utilities, disposal services and transportation. In 1989, a brownfield of the Ruhrgebiet became Emscher Park.

=== United Kingdom ===
In the UK, centuries of industrial use of lands which once formed the birthplace of the Industrial Revolution have left entire regions in a brownfield status. There are legal and fiscal incentives for brownfield redevelopment. Remediation laws are centered on the premise that the remediation should leave land safe and suitable for its current or intended use. In 2018, the Campaign to Protect Rural England (CPRE) reported that the 17,656 sites (covering over 28,000 hectares of land) identified by English local planning authorities on their Brownfield Land Registers would provide enough land for a minimum of 1 million homes, which could rise to over 1.1 million once all registers are published. The registers contain land that is available for redevelopment so is a small subset of all land that would be considered brownfield. There is also brownfield capacity in areas in which the green belt is in danger, for example in Northwest England, where local authorities have identified enough brownfield land to provide for 12 years of housing demand.

The UK government has recognised the ecological importance of brownfield sites and has afforded some protection to such habitats through the United Kingdom Biodiversity Action Plan. The Creekside Discovery Centre in Deptford, London is an urban wildlife centre encompassing brownfield habitats.

=== United States ===
United States estimates suggest there are over 500,000 brownfield sites contaminated at levels below the Superfund caliber (the most contaminated) in the country. While historic land use patterns created contaminated sites, the Superfund law has been criticized as creating the brownfield phenomenon where investment moves to greenfields for new development due to severe, no-fault liability schemes and other disincentives. The Clinton-Gore administration and US EPA launched a series of brownfield policies and programs in 1993 to tackle this problem.

== Redevelopment ==
=== Valuation and financing ===
Acquisition, adaptive re-use, and disposal of a brownfield site requires advanced and specialized appraisal analysis techniques. For example, the highest and best use of the brownfield site may be affected by the contamination, both before and after remediation. Additionally, the value should take into account residual stigma and potential for third-party liability. Normal appraisal techniques frequently fail, and appraisers must rely on more advanced techniques, such as contingent valuation, case studies, or statistical analyses. A 2011 University of Delaware study has suggested a 17.5:1 return on dollars invested on brownfield redevelopment. A 2014 study of EPA brownfield cleanup grants from 2002 through 2008 found an average benefit value of almost $4 million per brownfield site (with a median of $2.1 million). To expedite the cleanup of brownfield sites in the US, some environmental firms have teamed up with insurance companies to underwrite the cleanup and provide a guaranteed cleanup cost to limit land developers' exposure to environmental remediation costs and pollution lawsuits. The environmental firm first performs an extensive investigation generally in the form of desk studies and potentially further intrusive investigation.

=== Remediation strategies ===
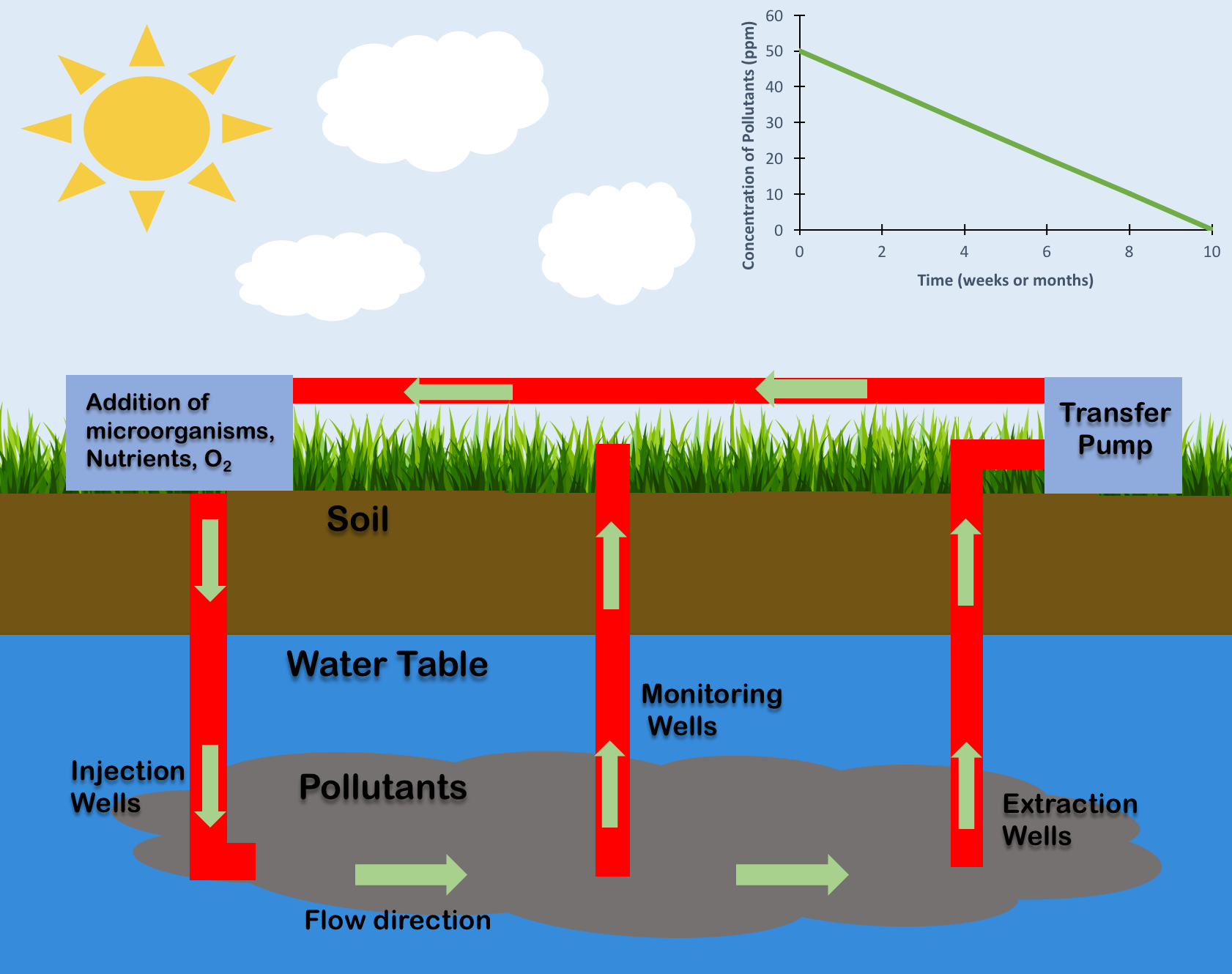
In Situ bioremediation, a method used to remove pollution from the soil located on brownfield land. This method is done on site instead of taking it elsewhere for processing.

Innovative remediation techniques used at distressed brownfields in recent years include in situ thermal remediation, bioremediation and in situ oxidation. Often, these strategies are used in conjunction with each other or with other remedial strategies such as soil vapor extraction. In this process, vapor from the soil phase is extracted from soils and treated, which has the effect of removing contaminants from the soils and groundwater beneath a site. Binders can be added to contaminated soil to prevent chemical leaching. Some brownfields with heavy metal contamination have even been cleaned up through an innovative approach called phytoremediation, which uses deep-rooted plants to soak up metals in soils into the plant structure as the plant grows. After they reach maturity, the plants – which now contain the heavy metal contaminants in their tissues – are removed and disposed of as hazardous waste.

Phytoremediation, a method that can be used to remove pollutants from brownfield land. It uses plants to take up pollutants from the soil.

Research is under way to see if some brownfields can be used to grow crops, specifically for the production of biofuels. Michigan State University, in collaboration with DaimlerChrysler and NextEnergy, has small plots of soybean, corn, canola, and switchgrass growing in a former industrial dump site in Oakland County, Michigan. The intent is to see if the plants can serve two purposes simultaneously: assist with phytoremediation, and contribute to the economical production of biodiesel and ethanol fuel.

The regeneration of brownfields in the United Kingdom and in other European countries has gained prominence due to greenfield land restrictions as well as their potential to promote the urban renaissance. Development of brownfield sites also presents an opportunity to reduce the environmental impact on communities, and considerable assessments need to take place in order to evaluate the size of this opportunity.

=== Barriers ===
Many contaminated brownfield sites sit unused for decades because the cost of cleaning them to safe standards is more than the land would be worth after redevelopment, in the process becoming involuntary parks as they grow over. However, redevelopment has become more common in the first decade of the 21st century, as developable land has become less available in highly populated areas, and brownfields contribute to environmental stigma which can delay redevelopment. Also, the methods of studying contaminated land have become more sophisticated and costly.

Some states and localities have spent considerable money assessing the contamination on local brownfield sites, to quantify the cleanup costs in an effort to move the redevelopment process forward. Therefore, federal and state programs have been developed to help developers interested in cleaning up brownfield sites and restoring them to practical uses.

In the process of cleaning contaminated brownfield sites, previously unknown underground storage tanks, buried drums or buried railroad tank cars containing wastes are sometimes encountered. Unexpected circumstances increase the cost for study and clean-up. As a result, the cleanup work may be delayed or stopped entirely. To avoid unexpected contamination and increased costs, many developers insist that a site be thoroughly investigated (via a Phase II Site Investigation or Remedial Investigation) prior to commencing remedial cleanup activities.

== Post-redevelopment uses ==
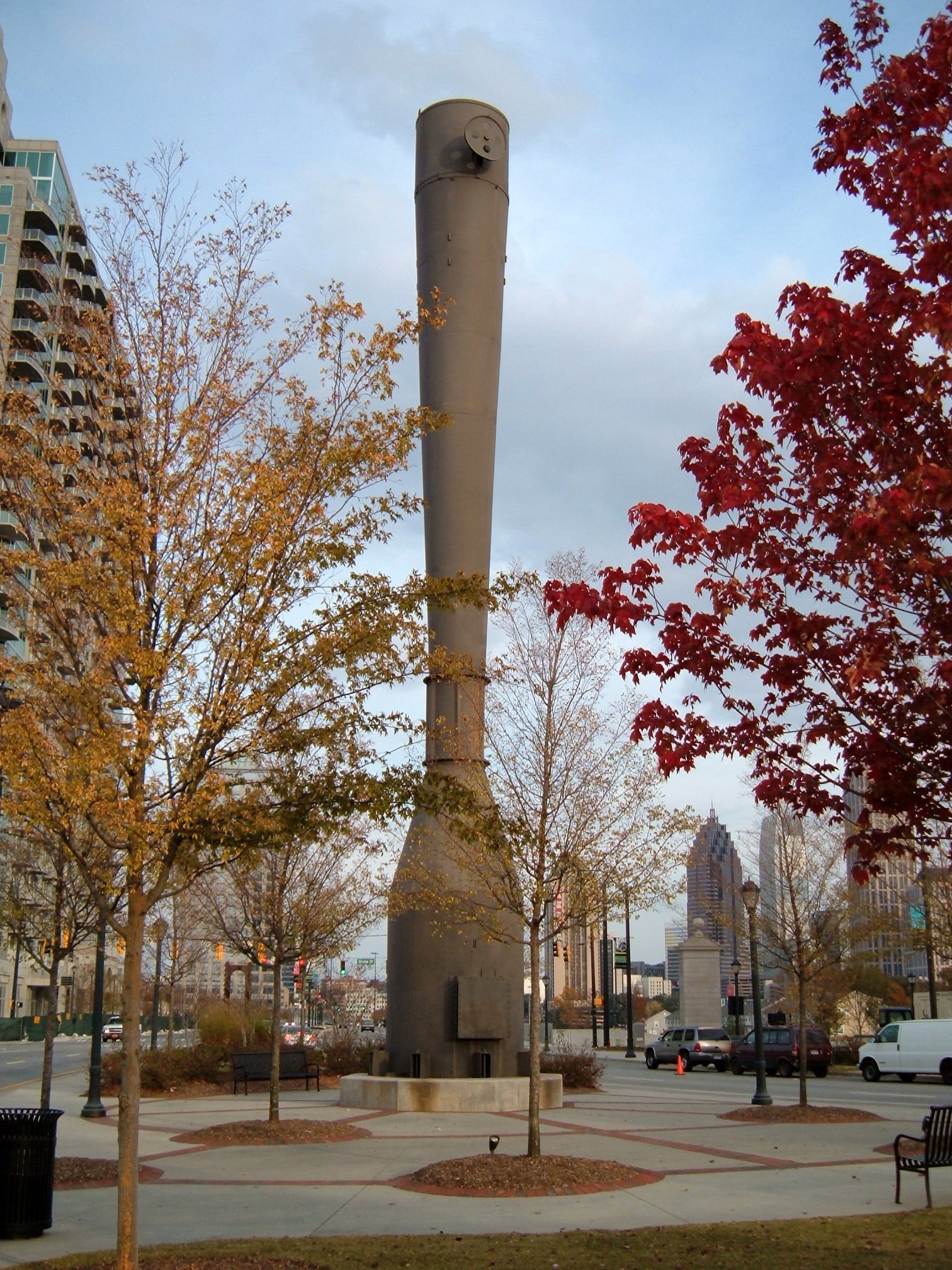
Brownfield relic serves as monument in a new park in Atlantic Station area of Atlanta, Georgia, U.S.

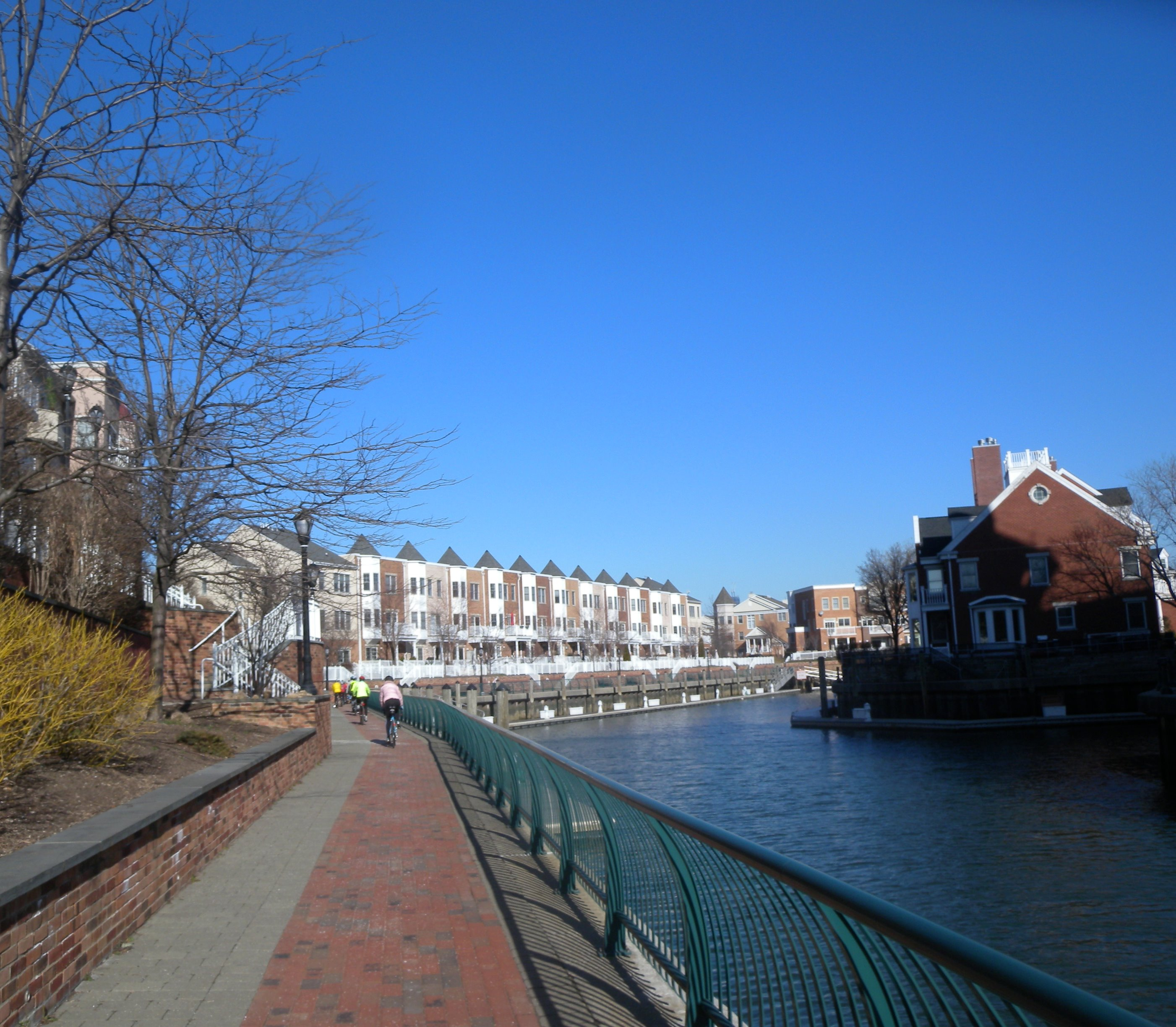
Residential development at former brownfield site in New Jersey

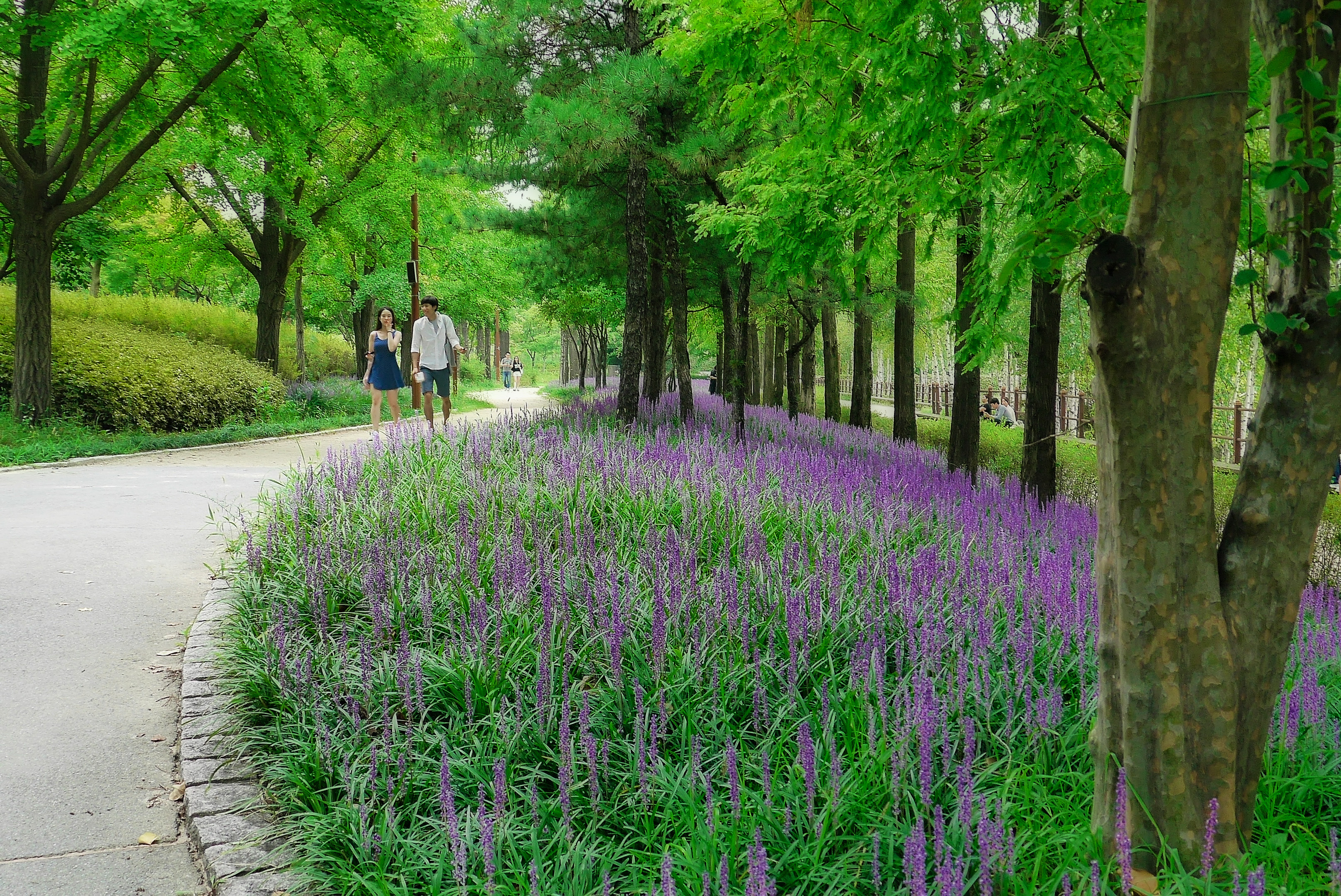
Pedestrians walking along hillside path in Seonyudo Park, Seoul, South Korea which was developed from a former brownfield site

=== Commercial and residential ===
As of 2006 the Atlantic Station project in Atlanta, was the largest brownfield redevelopment in the United States. Dayton, like many other cities in the region, is developing Tech Town in order to attract technology-based firms to Dayton and revitalize the downtown area. In Homestead, Pennsylvania, the site once occupied by Carnegie Steel has been converted into a successful commercial center, The Waterfront.

Pittsburgh, Pennsylvania, has successfully converted numerous former steel mill sites into high-end residential, shopping, and offices. Examples of brownfield redevelopment in Pittsburgh include:

- In Pittsburgh's Squirrel Hill neighborhood, a former slag dump for steel mills was turned into a $243 million residential development called Summerset at Frick Park.
- In Pittsburgh's South Side neighborhood, a former LTV Steel mill site was transformed into Southside Works, a mixed-use development that includes high-end entertainment, retail, offices, and housing.
- In the Hazelwood (Pittsburgh) neighborhood, a former Jones and Laughlin steel mill site was transformed into a $104 million office park called Pittsburgh Technology Center.
- In Herr's Island, a 17-hectare (42-acre) island on the western bank of the Allegheny River, a former rail stop for livestock and meatpacking was transformed into Washington's Landing, a waterfront center for commerce, manufacturing, recreation and upscale housing.

=== Solar landfill ===
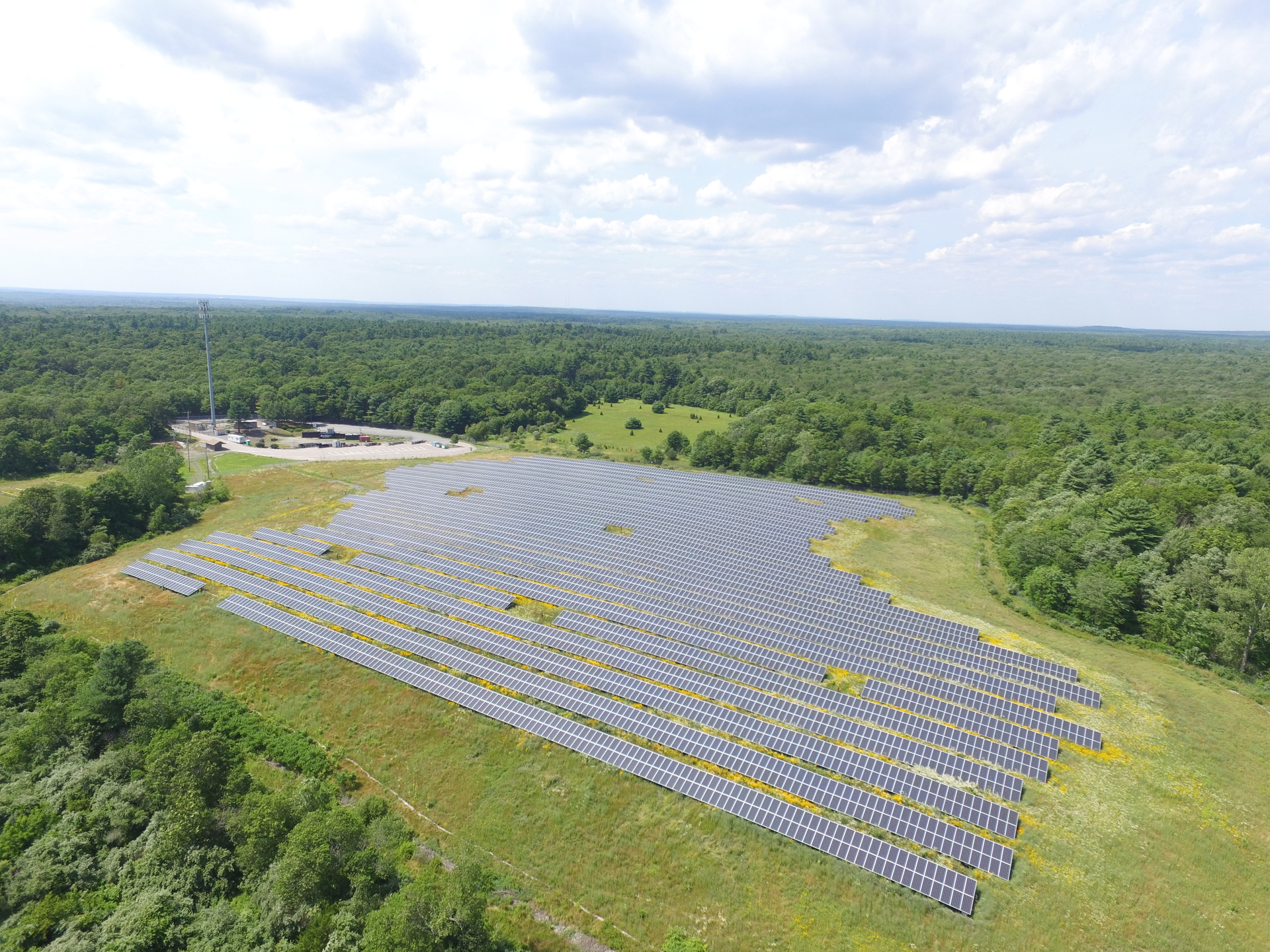
Solar arrays on a full landfill in Rehoboth, MA

A solar landfill is a repurposed used landfill that is converted to a solar array solar farm.

== Regulation ==
=== United States ===
In the United States, brownfield regulation and development is governed mainly by state environmental agencies in cooperation with the Environmental Protection Agency (EPA). In 1995, the EPA launched the Brownfields Program, which was expanded in 2002 with the Brownfields Law. The EPA and local and national governments can provide technical help and some funding for assessment and cleanup. From 2002 through 2013, the EPA awarded nearly 1,000 clean-up grants for almost $190 million. It can also provide tax incentives for cleanup that is not paid for outright; specifically, cleanup costs are fully tax-deductible in the year they are incurred. Many of the most important provisions on liability relief are contained in state codes that can differ significantly from state to state.

=== United Kingdom ===
In the United Kingdom, regulation of contaminated land comes from Part IIA of the Environmental Protection Act 1990; responsibility falls on local authorities to create a "contaminated land register". For sites with dubious past and present uses, the local planning authority may ask for a desktop study, which is sometimes implemented as a condition in planning applications. However by definition land that is derelict or underused is highly unlikely to be determined as contaminated land – primarily due to risks to human health.

The key regulation of brownfield land is through the land use planning system when a new land use is being considered.

== See also ==
- Greenfield project
- Brockton Brightfield (brownfield turned into a solar power plant)
- Greyfield land
- HUD USER
- Industrial nature
- Love Canal
- Redevelopment of Mumbai mills (unused mills being re-developed)
- Regulatory Barriers Clearinghouse
- Small Business Liability Relief and Brownfields Revitalization Act
- Waste (law)
- Urban renewal
- Vapor Intrusion
