= Redevelopment of Mumbai mills =

Development scheme in Mumbai, India

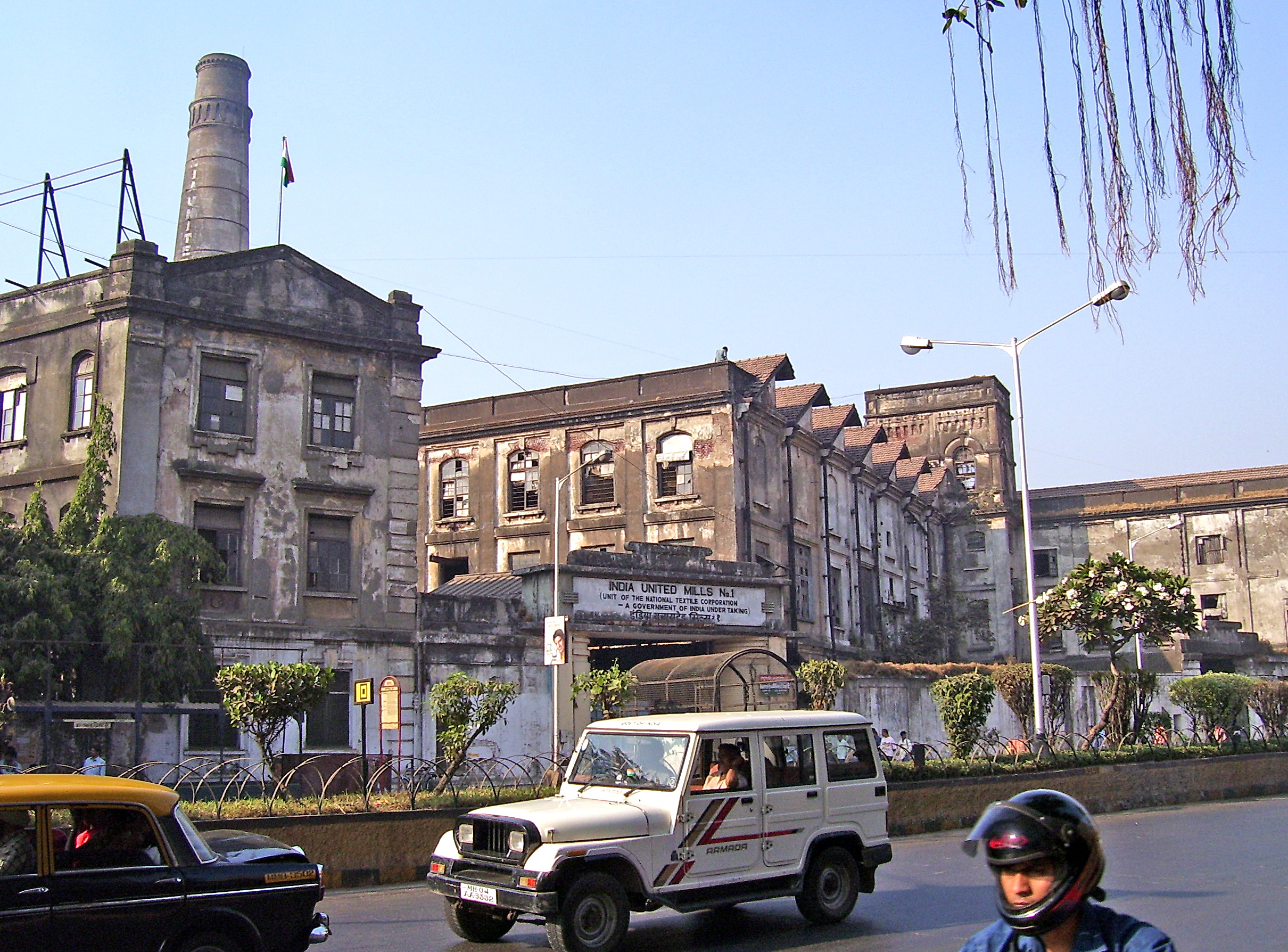
India United Mill, Parel district – one of Mumbai's largest cotton mills and also one of the few to be owned by the government.

The redevelopment of Mumbai's cotton mills began in 1992, when efforts began to demolish the numerous cotton mills that once dotted the landscape of Mumbai, India, to make way for new residential and commercial buildings, as part of the wider redevelopment and modernization of Mumbai.

== The cotton mill era and its decline ==
The mills of Girangaon were once integral to Mumbai's economy, particularly during the British colonial period, when Mumbai (then known as Bombay) was often referred to as the "Manchester of the East". However, with the development of newer industries in and around Mumbai, these mills ceased to be profitable, and fell into a state of disrepair.

In the first half of the nineteenth century, India exported cotton to Britain, and then reimported the textile. In 1820, the total textile import was valued at Rs. 350,000. However, the cost had escalated significantly by 1860, when textile imports stood at Rs. 19.3 million. The impetus towards the founding of a cotton industry came from Indian entrepreneurs. The first Indian cotton mill, "The Bombay Spinning Mill", was opened in 1854 in Bombay by Cowasji Nanabhai Davar. Opposition from the Lancashire mill owners was eventually offset by the support of the British manufacturers of textile machinery.

The cotton mills of Bombay, and the rest of India, were owned and managed mainly by Indians. The initial investments came from families of the mill-owners, mainly obtained from trading. Later, when shares became available to the public, much of the ownership still remained Indian – of the 53 mills in the city in 1925, only 14 were British-owned. The management and directorships of these mills were also mainly Indian; of the 386 directorships recorded in 1925, only 44 were English.

By 1870, there were 13 mills in Bombay. Cotton exports grew during the American Civil War, when supplies from the United States's cotton plantations were interrupted. At the end of 1895, there were 102 mills; growing to 136 by 1900. A period of stagnation set in during the recession of the 1920s. After World War II, under strong competition from Japan, the mills declined. In 1973, there remained only 79 active mills in the city.

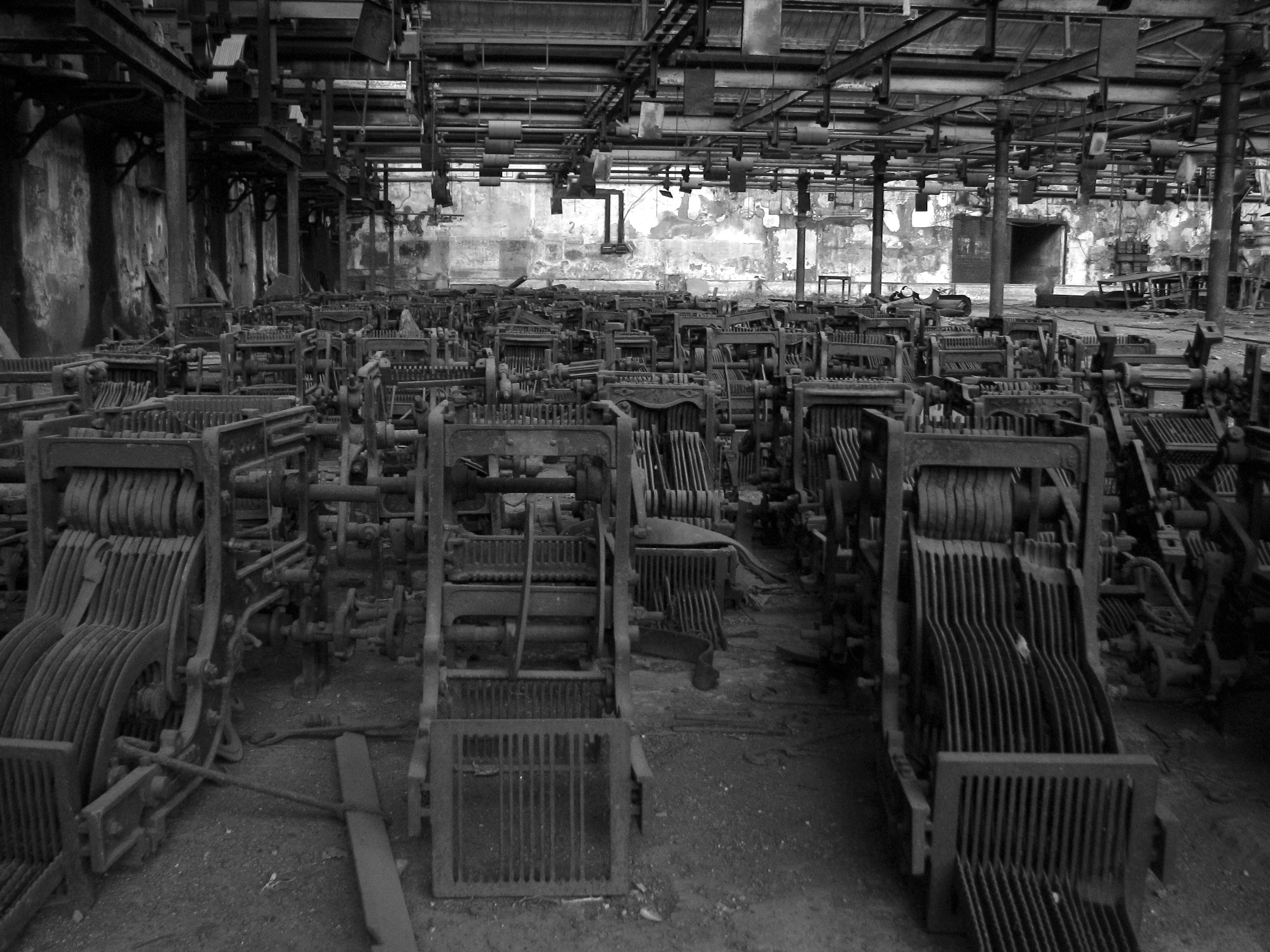
Abandoned machinery at Madhusudan Mills, Lower Parel.

Gradually, the government relaxed its norms that once restricted the redevelopment of mill lands, and as a result, numerous high-profile builders quickly took possession of these land parcels. Between 1990 and 2010, the majority of these mill lands were acquired and redeveloped.

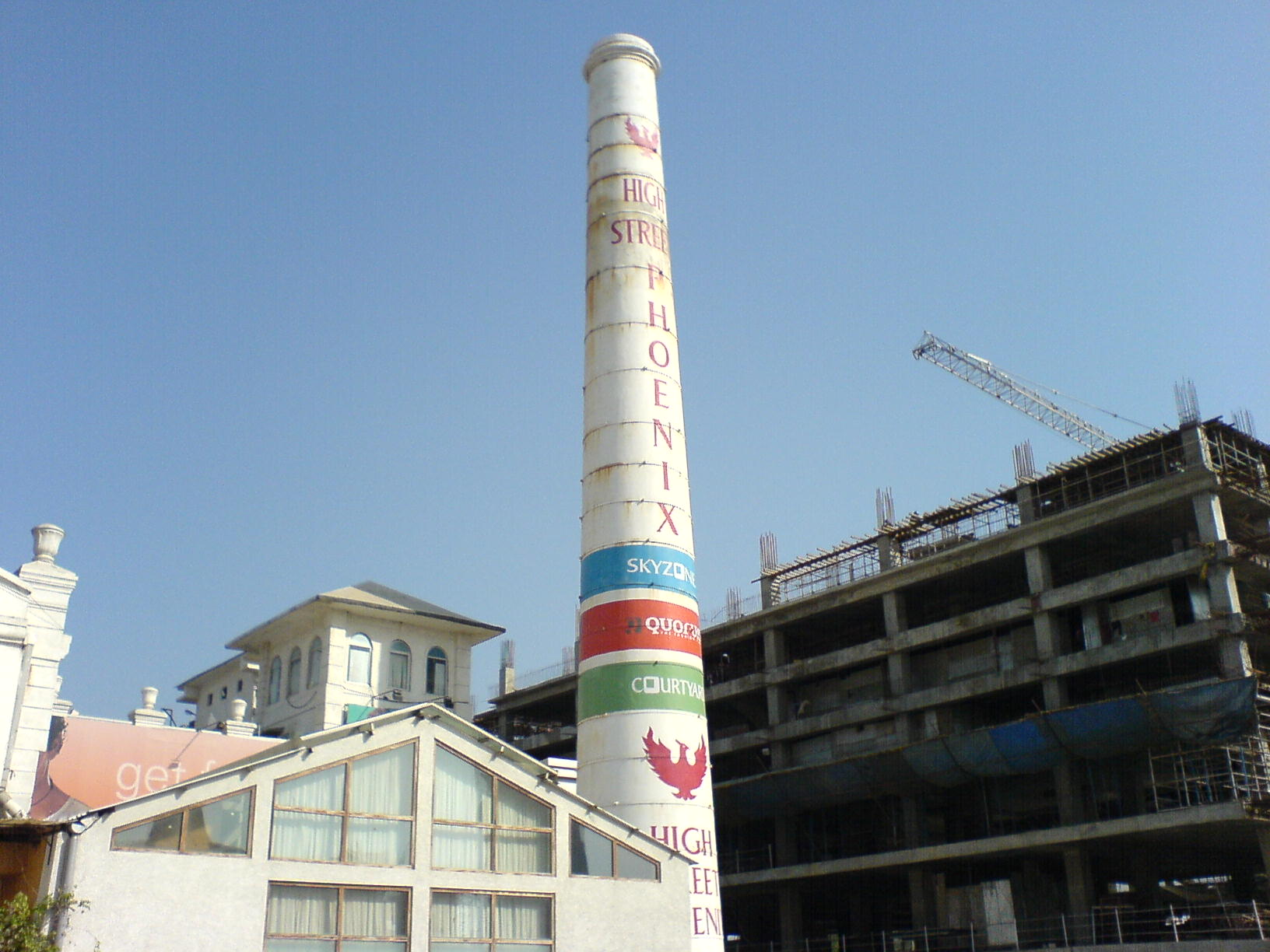
Phoenix Mills, Parel, which is now a shopping mall.

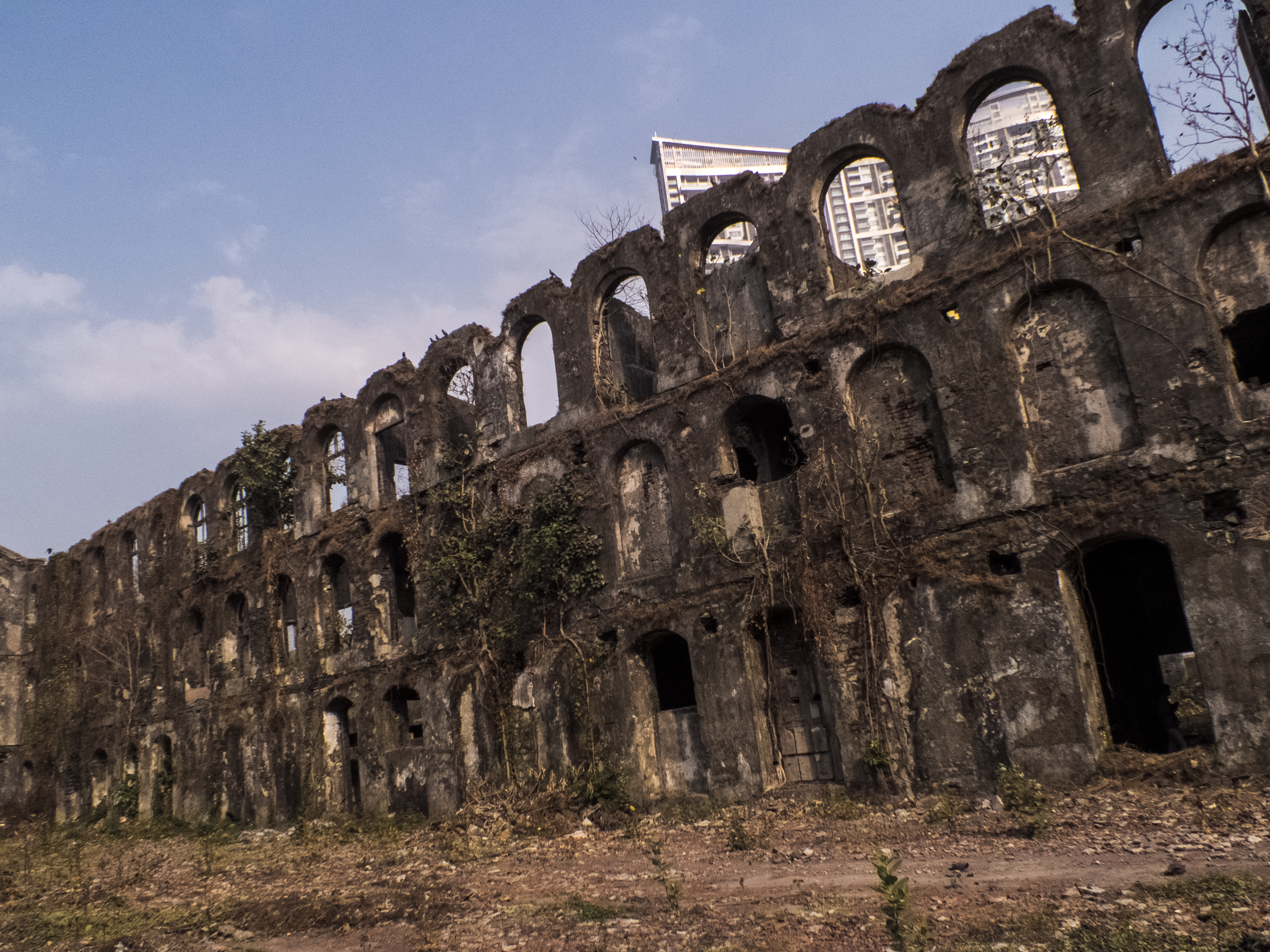
Ruins at Shakti Mills

== List of mills in Mumbai ==
The table below lists the names and district locations of Mumbai's former mills, and the structures (if any) that stand on their land today. This list is not exhaustive.

Name of former mill	Location	New development
Ambika Mills	Worli	Namaste Tower
Apollo Mills (South)	Mahalaxmi	Lodha Bellissimo/Primero
Bharat Mills	Lal Baug	Hilla Towers
Bombay Dyeing & Manufacturing Company	Worli	Hard Rock Café / ICC Bombay Realty
Bombay Dyeing (Spring Mills)	Dadar	Spring Mills tower
Bradbury Mills	Mahalaxmi	No development
Century Spinning & Weaving Mills	Worli	Century Bazaar
China Mill compound	Sewri	Dosti Flamingos
Dawn Mills	Lower Parel	Peninsula/Piramal Project
Digvijay Mills	Kalachowkie	No development
Elphinstone Mills (South)	Elphinstone	Indiabulls Finance Centre and Indiabulls Sky Suites
Empire Mills	Lower Parel	Empire Business Park
Gokuldas Morarjee Mills no.1	Parel	Ashok Towers
Gokuldas Morarjee Mills no.2	Lower Parel	Peninsula Corporate park
Gold Mohur Mills	Dadar	No development
Hindoostan Spinning & Weaving Mills No.1	Jacob Circle	Raheja Vivarea
Hindoostan Spinning & Weaving Mills no.2	Jacob Circle	Kalpataru Heights
Hindoostan Spinning & Weaving Mills no.3 (Crown Mills)	Prabhadevi	Orchid Crown
Hindoostan Spinning & Weaving Mills no.4	Prabhadevi	Hubtown - 25 South
India United Dye Works no.6 (North)	Prabhadevi	Indu Mill Compound
India United Mills no.1 (North)	Parel/Currey Road	No development
India United Mills no.2	Kalachowkie	MCGM
India United Mills no.3	Kalachowkie	MCGM
India United Mills no.4	Kalachowkie	MHADA
India United Mills no.5	Byculla	No development
India United Mills no.6	Mahim	No development
Jam Mills	Lalbaug	MHADA
Jupiter Mills (South)	Lower Parel	Indiabulls Sky
Kamala Mills	Lower Parel	Kamala City
Khatau Makanji Spinning & Weaving Mills	Byculla	Monte-South
Kohinoor Mills No.1 (North)	Dadar (E)	No development
Kohinoor Mills No.2 (North)	Dadar (E)	No development
Kohinoor Mills No.3 (North)	Dadar(W)	Kohinoor Mill Mall
Madhusudhan Mills	Worli	Enpar Lotus Towers
Mafatlal Mills no.1	Byculla	Piramal Aranya
Mafatlal Mills no.2	Byculla	
Mafatlal Mills no.3	Lower Parel	Marathon Futurex
Matrudas Mills	Lower Parel	Matrudas Mills Compound's
Matulya Mills	Lower Parel	Sun Palazzo, Ashford Casa Grande
Mukesh Textile Mills	Colaba	Venue for Bollywood filming
Modern Mills	Jacob Circle	Mahindra Belvedere Court
Morarjee Textile Mills	Parel	Ashok Towers
Mumbai Textile Mills (Sakseria Mills)	Lower Parel	Lodha Park
New City of Bombay Mfg Mills	Kalachowkie	No development
New Great Eastern Spinning & Weaving Mills	Byculla	Peninsula Land (under construction)
New Hind Textile Mills	Byculla	MHADA
New Islam Mills	Parel	One Avighna Park
Paragon Mills	Worli	Paragon Centre
Phoenix Mills	Lower Parel	High Street Phoenix
Piramal Spinning & Weaving Mills	Lower Parel	Marathon Nextgen by Marathon Group
Poddar Mills	Lower Parel	No development
Poddar Processors (Edward Mills)	Worli	Indiabulls Blu
Prakash Cotton Mills	Worli	No development
Raghuvanshi Mills	Lower Parel	K-lifestyle
Ruby Mills	Dadar	Ruby Corporate Park
Shakti Mills	Worli	No development
Shree Madhusudan Mills (South)		
Shree Ram Mills	Worli	Palais Royale, Mumbai
Shriniwas Mills	Lower Parel	World One
Simplex Mills	Jacob Circle	Planet Godrej
Sitaram Mills	Mahalaxmi	MCGM
Standard Mills	Prabhadevi	Sheth Beaumonde and Chaitanya Towers
Sun Mills Compound	Worli	Zenzi Mills Club / Lokhandwala Victoria
Swadeshi Mills	Kurla	No development
Swan Mills	Sewri	Ashok Gardens
Todi Mills	Lower Parel	Todi mills Compound
Tata Mills (North)	Dadar (E)	No development
Umri Mills	Lower Parel	Urmi Estate
Trinity Mills	Prabhadevi	Summer Trinity
Victoria Mills	Lower Parel	Victoria House (Commercial) & Car park
Western India Spinning & Weaving Mill	Kalachowkie	No development

== See also ==
- Brownfield land
- List of tallest buildings in Mumbai
- Urban regeneration
