= Namaste Tower =

Skyscraper office buildings in Mumbai

Coordinates: 18°59′29″N 72°49′24″E

- नमस्ते टावर
- Artist's impression of the Namaste Tower

- Location within Mumbai

General information
- Status: On hold
- Type: Residential, Commercial
- Location: Lower Parel, Mumbai
- Construction started: 2011
- Estimated completion: ?

Height
- Height: 310 metres (1,020 ft)

Technical details
- Floor count: 63
- Floor area: 116,000 m^{2} (1,250,000 sq ft)

Design and construction
- Architect: WS Atkins Plc
- Developer: Jaguar Buildcon

Namaste Tower was a planned 310 m (1,017 ft) tall skyscraper mega project in Mumbai, India. It would have been a mixed-use skyscraper of 63 floors housing a 380-room W Hotel, offices and retail space. It was designed by Atkins, Dubai. The design resembles the Namaste gesture: two wings of the hotel are clasped together like hands greeting.

It would have been built in Lower Parel, Mumbai, on land previously owned by Ambika Mills. The land was acquired by the builders for ongoing redevelopment of Mumbai mills.

== See also ==
- List of tallest buildings in Mumbai
- List of tallest buildings in India
