= Industrial nature =

Regeneration of vegetation on industrial sites

Industrial nature is the regeneration of vegetation on industrial sites; the invasion of abandoned or disused industrial sites by colonising species; or new plantings on abandoned, disused or remediated industrial sites. The underlying principle is that the historical industrial use of landscapes or sites creates a new environment which species can use either by design as in the case of a park or revegetated area, or by colonisation.

The concept has its origins in Germany, specifically at the Emscher Landscape Park in the Ruhr, (of which the Landschaftspark Duisburg-Nord is the best known example) and has been applied at the Sudgelande Park in Berlin.

Another example can be found at the Deutsches Technikmuseum German Museum of Technology (Berlin), at the former locomotive workshops and goods yard (Anhalter Güterbahnhof) of Berlin-Anhalt Railway Company. Here much of the goods yard and part of the roundhouse complex have been left as a ruin, colonised by a variety of non-native plants.

== See also ==
- Abandoned railway
- Abandoned railway station
- Abandoned village
- Brownfields
- Chernobyl exclusion zone
- Cultural landscape
- Ecological succession
- Korean Demilitarized Zone
- Old field (ecology)
- Indian old field
- Passive rewilding
- Urban prairie
