= Sunil Shanbag =

Indian theatre director and filmmaker (born 1956)

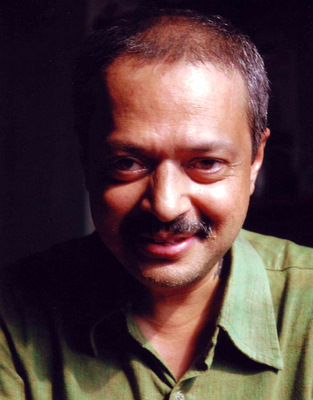
- Shanbag in Mumbai, 2008
- Born: 7 October 1956 (age 69)
- Education: University of Bombay
- Occupations: Theatre director; screenwriter; filmmaker
- Years active: 1974–present

Sunil Shanbag (born 7 October 1956) is an Indian theatre director, screenwriter and documentary filmmaker. He has graduated from University of Bombay, and although he didn't have any formal training in theatre, he has worked extensively with Satyadev Dubey, who considers him one of his foremost protégés. In 1985, Shanbag founded the theatre company Arpana. Its work is characterised by "contemporary and original texts by Indian and international playwrights (in translation), strong performances, minimalist staging, and innovative use of music and design."

== Plays ==
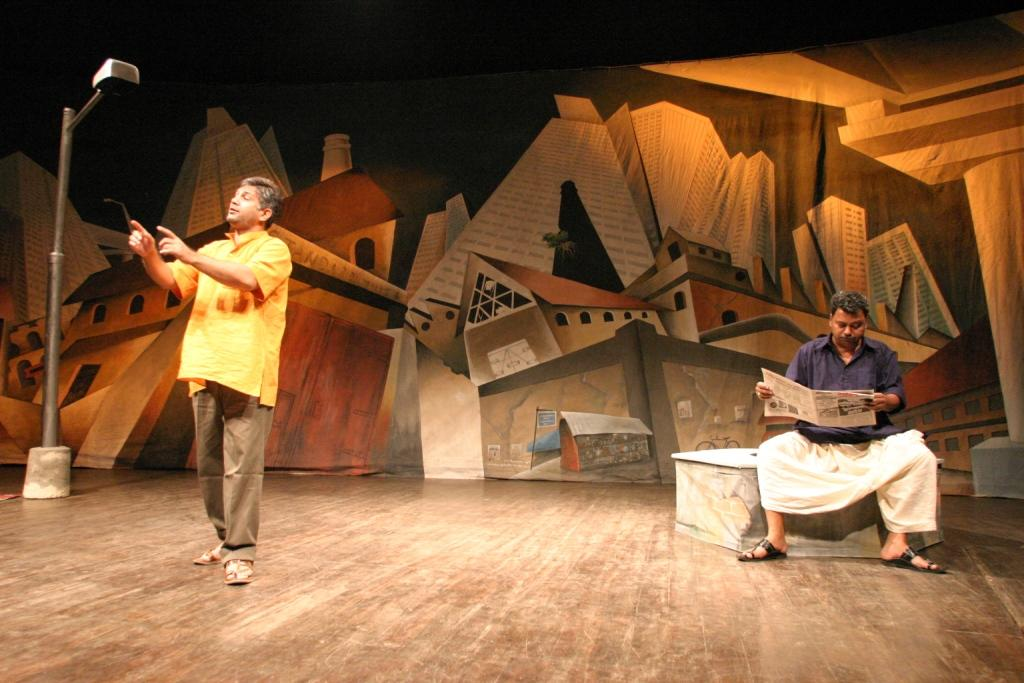
Scene from a popular 2007 play "Cotton 56 Polyester 84" by Sunil Shanbag about life in Girangaon

In 2007, Shanbag directed the critically acclaimed Cotton 56, Polyester 84 which won three META awards at the Mahindra Theatre Festival, including Best Original Script for its writer, Ramu Ramanathan. The play is a celebration of Mumbai, through the culture spawned by rapid industrialisation, specially in the mills of Girangaon.

In 2010, Shanbag opened the play S*x M*rality & Cens*rship. The play revolves around the censorship woes faced by Vijay Tendulkar's Sakharam Binder in Mumbai in 1974, juxtaposing this against the sanitising of tamasha traditions by middle-class conservatism. The play was funded by a grant from the India Foundation for the Arts and underwent research and rehearsals for almost a year. Ultimately, it was nominated for nine awards at the META Awards, with supporting actress Geetanjali Kulkarni finally winning for her performance.

Also in 2010, through his play Dreams of Taleem, Shanbag tried to cope with the death of playwright Chetan Datar by incorporating Datar's play 1, Madhavbaug in a narrative that dealt with the isolation felt by its gay protagonists. According to The Hindu, it did not seem to ask any new questions in the areas of theatre and sexuality, "despite its strong performances and a script that was otherwise quite seamless."

In 2011, Shanbag presented his musical, Stories in a Song. The show was conceived by noted classical vocalist Shubha Mudgal and percussionist Aneesh Pradhan for the 2011 Baaja Gaaja festival in Pune. According to Mumbai Mirror, the stories in the play "reflected the socio-historical times in which they happened, and are lightly lined with satirical or sympathetic comment."

In 2012, Shanbag was invited to perform a Gujarati adaptation of All's Well That Ends Well as part of the Globe to Globe festival in London, in which all 37 of Shakespeare's plays were performed in 37 different languages at Shakespeare's Globe. The play was well received in the UK press, with The Guardian giving it a four-star rating, and the Arts Desk stating, "Shakespeare's problem play is solved by a buoyant Gujarati staging from Mumbai." Titled Maro Piyu Gayo Rangoon in India, the play had previously premiered in Mumbai, with veteran theatre critic Shanta Gokhale describing it as "a truly remarkable achievement". In 2014, the play was invited back to the Globe for another run of shows in a month that marked the 450th birth anniversary of Shakespeare.

In April 2016, Shanbag directed his inaugural tiatr production titled Loretta, which is an English play set in Goa during the 1970s. Its initial performance took place in Mumbai. The original script, crafted in Konkani by Pundalik Naik, was subsequently translated into English by Milind Dhaimade.

== Films ==
Shanbag has worked with Shyam Benegal and was a co-author, along with Shama Zaidi, for the television serials Yatra and Bharat Ek Khoj. In 1993, he produced Maihar Raag, which won the National Film Award for Best Non-Feature Film in 1994.

In 2009, Shanbag directed the short film, The Sword and the Spear, which was based on an international tour undertaken by contemporary dancer Astad Deboo and his troupe of Thang-ta martial arts performers from Manipur.
