= Tech Town (Dayton) =

Coordinates: 39°46′02″N 84°10′49″W

Tech Town Location

Tech Town is a 40-acre (16 ha) district developed in downtown Dayton, Ohio, that is located near Day Air Ballpark. Tech Town was one of ten "brownfields" in the Dayton area, and is designed to attract technology-based firms to Dayton and revitalize the downtown area. Tech Town's first major lab was opened in September 2009. Tech Town will be a mixed-use development to promote the creation of a mixed use neighborhood (single use campus) that supports/leverages the functions of daily life: employment, recreation, retail, civic and educational opportunities. Tech Town will encompass approximately 400,000 square feet (37,000 m^{2}) of office and research space and accommodate up to 2,500 jobs once completed.
