= Phase I environmental site assessment =

Contamination assessment for US real estate, known as 'ESA'

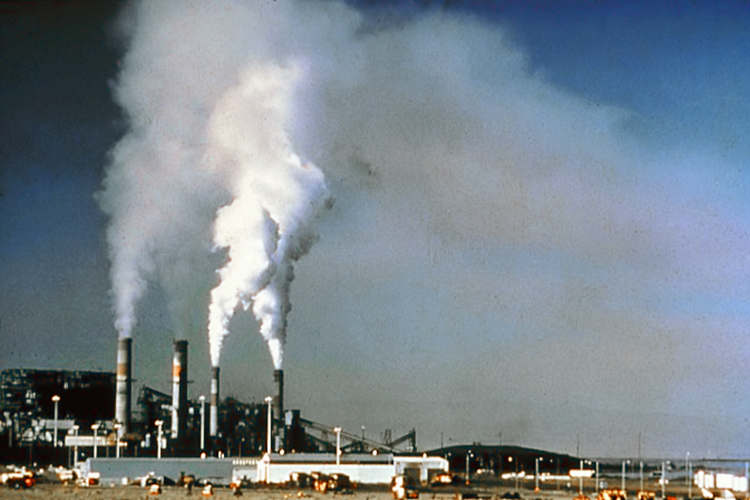
Any piece of real estate can be the subject of a Phase I ESA.

In the United States, an environmental site assessment is a report prepared for a real estate holding that identifies potential or existing environmental contamination liabilities. The analysis, often called an ESA, typically addresses both the underlying land as well as physical improvements to the property. A proportion of contaminated sites are "brownfield sites." In severe cases, brownfield sites may be added to the National Priorities List where they will be subject to the U.S. Environmental Protection Agency's Superfund program.

The actual sampling of soil, air, groundwater and/or building materials is typically not conducted during a Phase I ESA. The Phase I ESA is generally considered the first step in the process of environmental due diligence. Standards for performing a Phase I site assessment have been promulgated by the US EPA and are based in part on ASTM in Standard E1527-13.

If a site is considered contaminated, a Phase II environmental site assessment may be conducted, ASTM test E1903, a more detailed investigation involving chemical analysis for hazardous substances and/or petroleum hydrocarbons.

== Background ==
As early as the 1970s, specific property purchasers in the United States undertook studies resembling current Phase I ESAs to assess risks of ownership of commercial properties which had a high degree of risk from prior toxic chemical use or disposal. Many times these studies were preparatory to understanding the nature of cleanup costs if the property was being considered for redevelopment or change of land use.

In the United States of America demand increased dramatically for this type of study in the 1980s following judicial decisions related to liability of property owners to effect site cleanup. Interpreting the Comprehensive Environmental Response, Compensation and Liability Act of 1980 (CERCLA), the U.S. courts have held that a buyer, lessor, or lender may be held responsible for remediation of hazardous substance residues, even if a prior owner caused the contamination; performance of a Phase I Environmental Site Assessment, according to the courts' reasoning, creates a safe harbor, known as the "Innocent Landowner Defense." The original standard under CERCLA for establishing an innocent landowner defense was based upon the requirement to perform an "all appropriate inquiry" prior to ownership transfer. At such time, engineering firms started performing professional engineering reports under a variety of monikers including "Environmental Audits," "Property Transfer Screens," "Environmental Due-Diligence Reports," and "Environmental Site Assessments." In 1991, Impact Environmental coined the industry term “Environmental Site Assessment” to replace the commonly used "Environmental Audit” for property transfer studies. A 1990 Court decision, no. 89-8094 (11th Cir. May 23, 1990), United States v. Fleet Factors Corp., found that a secured creditor can be liable for property contamination under the strict, joint and several liability scheme outlined in CERCLA. As a result of this decision, banks elevated their demands for pre-transfer of all appropriate inquiries to hedge against financial risk. Starting in the New York market among banks and regional environmental consulting engineers, the term of choice evolved to Phase I Environmental Site Assessment.

In 1998, the necessity of performing a Phase I ESA was underscored by congressional action in passing the Superfund Cleanup Acceleration Act of 1998. This act requires purchasers of commercial property to perform a Phase I study meeting the specific standard of ASTM E1527: Standard Practice for Environmental Site Assessments: Phase I Environmental Site Assessment Process.

The most recent standard is "Standards and Practices for All Appropriate Inquiries" 40 Code of Federal Regulations, Section 312 which drew heavily from ASTM E1527-13, the ASTM Standard for conducting "All Appropriate Inquiry" (AAI) for the environmental assessment of a real property. Previous guidance regarding the ASTM E1527 standard were ASTM E1527-97, ASTM E1527-00, and ASTM E1527-05.

Residential property purchasers are only required to conduct a site inspection and chain of title survey.

== Triggering actions ==
A variety of reasons for a Phase I study to be performed exist, the most common being:

- Purchase of real property by a person or entity not previously on title.
- Contemplation by a new lender to provide a loan on the subject real estate.
- Partnership buyout or principal redistribution of ownership.
- Application to a public agency for change of use or other discretionary land use permit.
- Existing property owner's desire to understand toxic history of the property.
- Compulsion by a regulatory agency who suspects toxic conditions on the site.
- Divestiture of properties.

== Scope ==
Scrutiny of the land includes examination of potential soil contamination, groundwater quality, surface water quality, vapor intrusion, and sometimes issues related to hazardous substance uptake by biota. The examination of a site may include: definition of any chemical residues within structures; identification of possible asbestos containing building materials; inventory of hazardous substances stored or used on site; assessment of mold and mildew; and evaluation of other indoor air quality parameters.

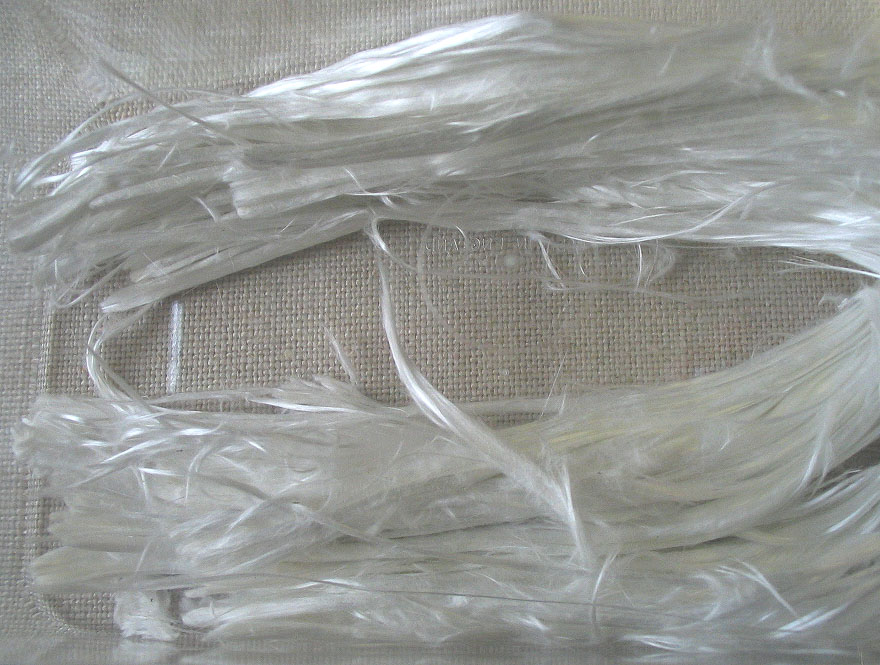
Asbestos-containing materials are not typically surveyed during a Phase I site inspection, but suspect building materials may be noted

Depending upon precise protocols utilized, there are a number of variations in the scope of a Phase I study. The tasks listed here are common to almost all Phase I ESAs:

- Performance of an on-site visit to view present conditions (chemical spill residue, die-back of vegetation, etc.); hazardous substances or petroleum products usage (presence of above ground or underground storage tanks, storage of acids, etc.); and evaluate any likely environmentally hazardous site history.
- Evaluation of risks of neighboring properties upon the subject property
- Review of Federal, State, Local and Tribal Records out to distances specified by the ASTM 1528 and AAI Standards (ranging from 1/8 to 1 mile depending on the database)
- Interview of persons knowledgeable regarding the property history (past owners, present owner, key site manager, present tenants, neighbors).
- Examine municipal or county planning files to check prior land usage and permits granted.
- Conduct file searches with public agencies (State water board, fire department, county health department, etc.) having oversight relative to water quality and soil contamination issues.
- Examine historical aerial photography of the vicinity.
- Examine current USGS maps to scrutinize drainage patterns and topography.
- Examine chain-of-title for Environmental Liens and/or Activity and Land Use Limitations (AULs).

In most cases, the public file searches, historical research and chain-of-title examinations are outsourced to information services that specialize in such activities. Non-Scope Items in a Phase I Environmental Site Assessment can include visual inspections or records review searches for:

- Asbestos Containing Building Materials (ACBM)
- Lead-Based Paint
- Lead in Drinking Water
- Mold
- Radon
- Wetlands
- Threatened and Endangered Species
- Mercury poisoning
- Debris flow
- Earthquake Hazard
- Vapor intrusion
- Emerging contaminants

Observations of Non-scope Items can be reported as "findings" if requested by the report user, however, these items do not constitute recognized environmental conditions.

== Preparers ==
Often a multi-disciplinary approach is taken in compiling all the components of a Phase I study, since skills in chemistry, atmospheric physics, geology, microbiology and even botany are frequently required. Many of the preparers are environmental scientists who have been trained to integrate these diverse disciplines. Many states have professional registrations which are applicable to the preparers of Phase I ESAs; for example, the state of California had a registration entitled "California Registered Environmental Assessor Class I or Class II" until July 2012, when it removed this REA certification program due to budget cuts.

Under ASTM E 1527-13 parameters were set forth as to who is qualified to perform Phase I ESAs. An Environmental Professional is someone with:

1. a current Professional Engineer's or Professional Geologist's license or registration from a state or U.S. territory with 3 years equivalent full-time experience; or
2. a Baccalaureate or higher degree from an accredited institution of higher education in a discipline of engineering or science and 5 years equivalent full-time experience; or
3. have the equivalent of 10 years full-time experience.

A person not meeting one or more of those qualifications may assist in the conduct of a Phase I ESA if the individual is under the supervision or responsible charge of a person meeting the definition of an Environmental Professional when concluding such activities.

Most site assessments are conducted by private companies independent of the owner or potential purchaser of the land.

== Examples ==
While there are myriad sites that have been analyzed to date within the United States, the following list will serve as examples of the subject matter:

- Auke Bay U.S. Postal Facility, Juneau, Alaska
- Esso Canada Ltd. Former Bulk Fuels Facility, Owen Sound, Ontario, Canada
- Dakin Building, Brisbane, California
- East Elk Grove Specific Plan, Elk Grove, California
- Mariners Marsh Park, Staten Island, New York
- Richmond State Hospital Farm Industrial Park, Wayne County, Indiana
- Sydney Steel Plant Lands, Sydney, Nova Scotia
- Weyerhauser Technology Center, Federal Way, Washington

== International context ==
In Japan, with the passage of the 2003 Soil Contamination Countermeasures Law, there is a strong movement to conduct Phase I studies more routinely. At least one jurisdiction in Canada (Ontario) now requires the completion of a Phase I prior to the transfer of some types of industrial properties. Some parts of Europe began to conduct Phase I studies on selected properties in the 1990s, but still lack the comprehensive attention given to virtually all major real estate transactions in the USA.

In the United Kingdom contaminated land regulation is outlined in the Environment Act 1995. The Environment Agency of England and Wales have produced a set of guidance; CLEA a standardized approach to the assessment of land contamination. A Phase 1 Desktop Study is often required in support of a planning application. These reports must be assembled by a "competent person".

== Other environmental site assessment types ==
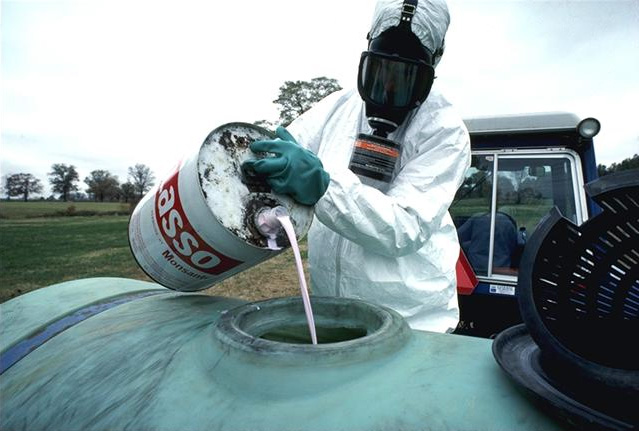
Storage and handling of toxics is assessed for each site within a Phase I study.

There are several other report types that have some resemblance in name or degree of detail to the Phase I Environmental Site Assessment:

Phase II Environmental Site Assessment is an "intrusive" investigation which collects original samples of soil, groundwater or building materials to analyze for quantitative values of various contaminants. This investigation is normally undertaken when a Phase I ESA determines a likelihood of site contamination. The most frequent substances tested are petroleum hydrocarbons, heavy metals, pesticides, solvents, asbestos and mold.

Phase III Environmental Site Assessment is an investigation involving remediation of a site. Phase III investigations aim to delineate the physical extent of contamination based on recommendations made in Phase II assessments. Phase III investigations may involve intensive testing, sampling, and monitoring, "fate and transport" studies and other modeling, and the design of feasibility studies for remediation and remedial plans. This study normally involves assessment of alternative cleanup methods, costs and logistics. The associated reportage details the steps taken to perform site cleanup and the follow-up monitoring for residual contaminants.

Limited Phase I Environmental Site Assessment is a truncated Phase I ESA, normally omitting one or more work segments such as the site visit or certain of the file searches. When the field visit component is deleted the study is sometimes called a Transaction Screen.

Environmental Assessment has little to do with the subject of hazardous substance liability, but rather is a study preliminary to an Environmental Impact Statement, which identifies environmental impacts of a land development action and analyzes a broad set of parameters including biodiversity, environmental noise, water pollution, air pollution, traffic, geotechnical risks, visual impacts, public safety issues and also hazardous substance issues.

SBA Phase I Environmental Site Assessment means all properties purchased through the United States Small Business Administration's 504 Fixed Asset Financing Program require specific and often higher due diligence requirements than regular Real Estate transactions. Due diligence requirements are determined according to the NAICS codes associated with the prior business use of the property. There are 58 specific NAICS codes that require Phase I Investigations. These include, but are not limited to: Funeral Homes, Dry Cleaners, and Gas Stations. The SBA also requires Phase II Environmental Site Assessment to be performed on any Gas Station that has been in operation for more than 5 years. The additional cost to perform this assessment cannot be included in the amount requested in the loan and adds significant costs to the borrower.

Freddie Mac/Fannie Mae Phase I Environmental Site Assessments are two specialized types of Phase I ESAs that are required when a loan is financed through Freddie Mac or Fannie Mae. The scopes of work are based on the ASTM E1527-05 Standard but have specific requirements including the following: the percent and scope of the property inspection; requirements for radon testing; asbestos and lead-based paint testing and operations-and-maintenance (O&M) plans to manage the hazards in place; lead in drinking water; and mold inspection. For condominiums, Fannie Mae requires a Phase I ESA anytime the initial underwriting analysis indicates environmental concerns.

HUD Phase I Environmental Site Assessment The U.S. Department of Housing and Urban Development also requires a Phase I ESA for any condominium under construction that wishes to offer an FHA insured loan to potential buyers.

== See also ==
- Environmental remediation
- Environmental scientist
- Institute of Environmental Management and Assessment
