= High Street Phoenix =

Phoenix Palladium

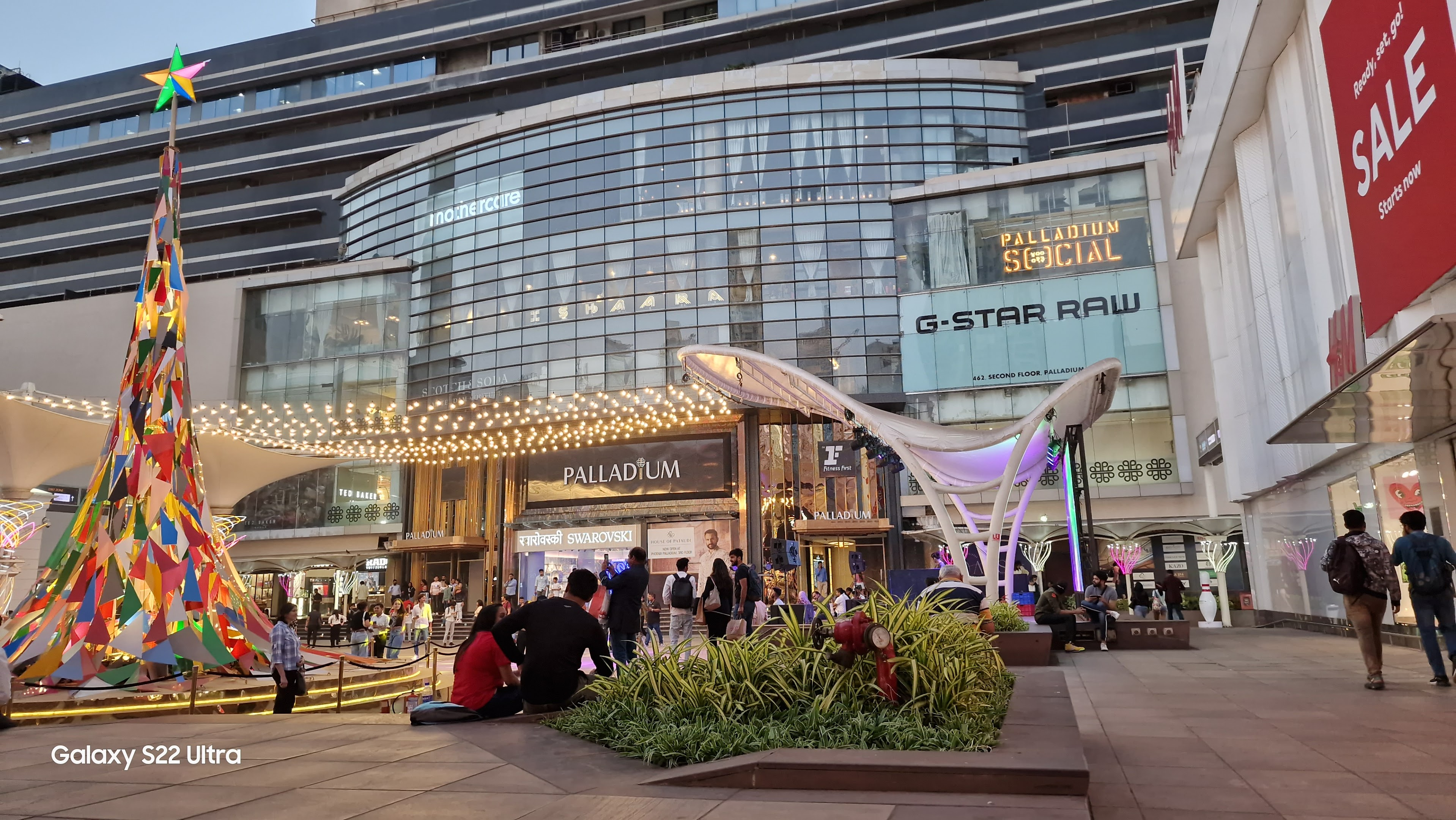
- Phoenix Palladium, Mumbai. Main entrance with outdoor seating and seasonal decorations.
- Location: Lower Parel, Mumbai, India
- Coordinates: 18°59′38.4″N 72°49′27.9″E
- Opened: 1996
- Developer: The Phoenix Mills Limited
- Manager: Atul Ruia
- Owner: The Phoenix Mills Co. Ltd
- Architect: Andre Bilokur
- Num. of stores: 500
- Floor area: 490,000 square feet (46,000 m^{2})
- Floors: 4
- Website: phoenixpalladium.com

High Street Phoenix, formerly known as Phoenix Mall, is one of the largest shopping malls in India, situated in Lower Parel, Mumbai. Its gross floor area is 3,300,000 square feet (310,000 m^{2}). In addition to the mall, the compound hosts a five-star hotel, a multiplex, commercial space and a residential tower.

The mall consists of SkyZone and Grand Galleria. South Asia's largest 20 lane bowling concourse was first started here in the year 1996. India's first Hyper market concept Big Bazaar was introduced in 2001 at High Street Phoenix.

== History ==
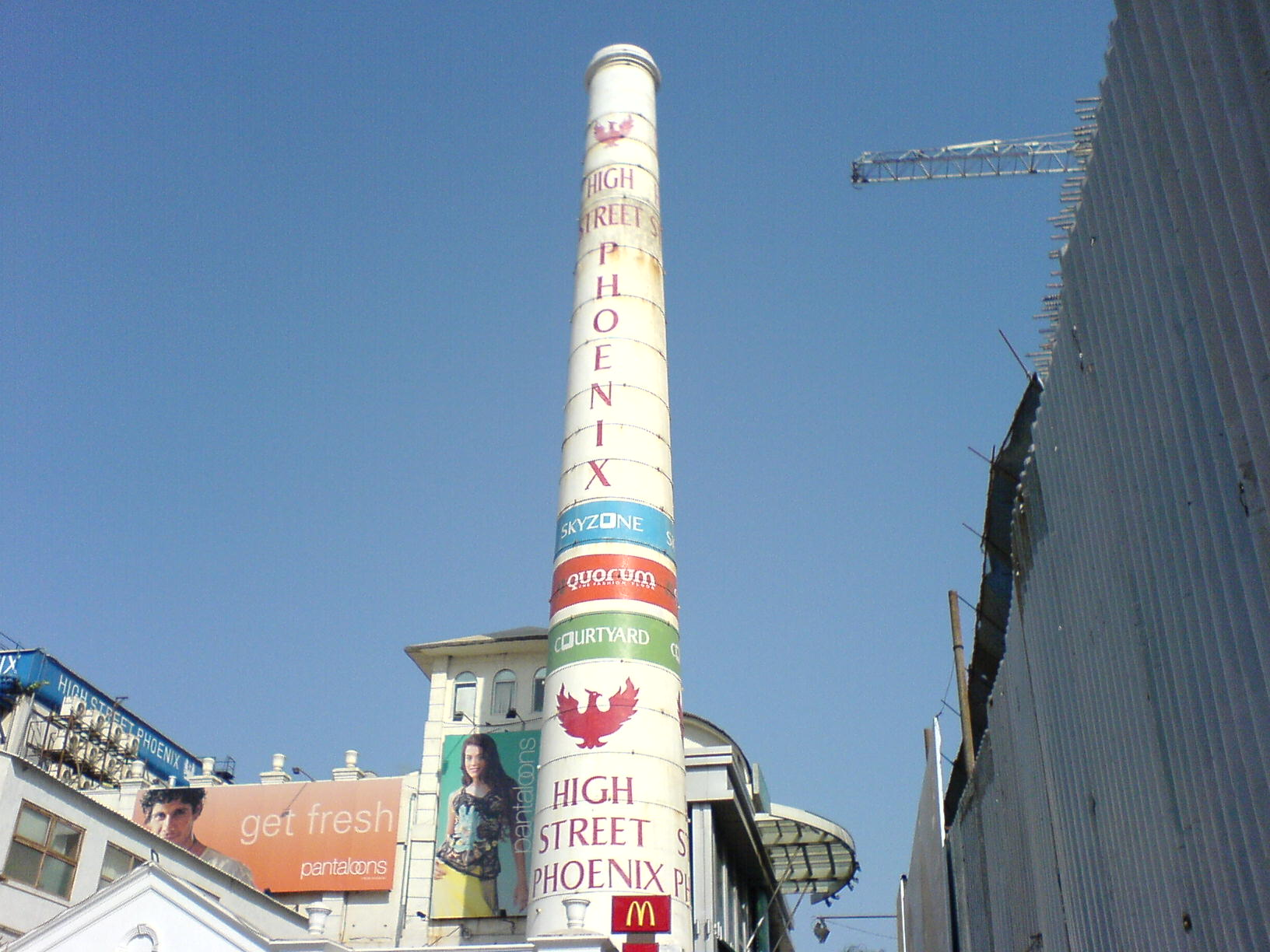
Erstwhile Phoenix Mills' chimney has been kept intact as a memorabilia of the Phoenix Mills

Phoenix Mills was originally started in 1905 to manufacture cotton textiles in Bombay by Ramnarain Ruia. The company, which has been listed on the Bombay Stock Exchange since 1959, is owned by the Ruia family.

In 1938, the British government ordered firing at workers who were peacefully protesting the proposed Bombay Trades Disputes Bill. The workers at Phoenix Mills went on a strike between 11 April 1939 and 1 November 1939, demanding an increase in pay. Phoenix was affected by the general strike that shut down all mills in Mumbai (then Bombay) for over a year in 1982–83. Mumbai's mills went through a turbulent time in the 1980s and '90s owing to labour unrest in addition to higher operating costs of a mill inside Mumbai, making mills such as Phoenix loss-making and nonviable entities. The management chose redevelopment of mill land, which had high commercial value. Sections of the mill were still operational when redevelopment began with the establishment of the Bowling Co. Workers were unhappy with the management's decision, alleging that it was illegal.

In 2005, Phoenix Mills celebrated its 100th anniversary.

== Redevelopment ==
Phoenix was one of the first mill companies to go in for redevelopment; the compound has been redeveloped and includes a luxury tower, a hotel, and shopping mall whereas the chimney is reminiscent of its past as a mill. While existing structures have been retained due to government rules, they have been refurbished, and additional structures have been built around them in phases. In 1977, a fire destroyed its spinning units, and the company decided to replace the area with a 28-story residential tower, which came up in 1992. By the late 1990s, Bowling Co, India's first bowling company and sports bar, and a night club, Fire and Ice, had been built at Phoenix Mills, which was facing trouble with keeping afloat as a mill. Standard Chartered Bank too moved its offices into Phoenix Mills, taking a 30,000-square-foot area in 1998.

In 2007, Phoenix joined up with Shangri-La Hotels and Resorts to run a five-star hotel for them in the Phoenix Mills compound, and got divided into Palladium and Grand Galleria. Within 9 months, Shangri-La later withdrew management services to the hotel and broke the 20-year contract leading the hotel to temporarily operate as the Palladium Hotel Mumbai and later the St.Regis Mumbai.

PVR Cinemas runs a multiplex at Phoenix.

== Development ==
In 2007, Phoenix Mills announced the development of Market Cities in Pune, Bangalore, Mumbai, and Chennai, which were completed respectively. In Bangalore, they have developed the residential project named as One Bangalore West in the heart of the city, Rajajinagar which is also listed amongst the tallest building in Bangalore. In Pune, they are developing a residential property named as Phoenix Fountainhead near by Phoenix Market City.

== Palladium Mall ==
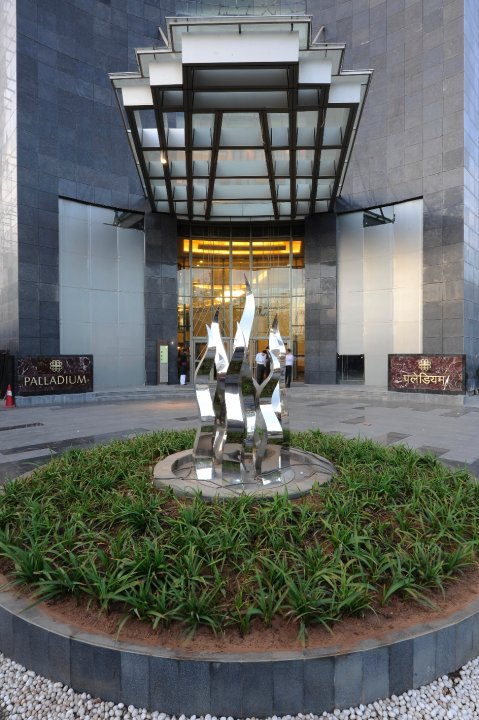
Palladium Mall, Mumbai

Palladium Mall, the first premium luxury retail and entertainment destination of Mumbai located in the same compound of High Street Phoenix, was completed in 2007. Palladium (Mumbai) offers four levels of shopping in an atmosphere of refinement. Its leasable area is 280,000 square feet (26,000 m^{2}) and it has 115 stores as of now.

== See also ==
- List of shopping malls in India
