= The Cousins Thackeray =

2019 book by Dhaval Kulkarni

The Cousins Thackeray: Uddhav, Raj and the Shadow of their Senas
- Cover of 2019 ed.
- Author: Dhaval Kulkarni
- Publisher: Penguin eBury Press
- Publication date: 2019
- ISBN: 978-0143448488

The Cousins Thackeray: Uddhav, Raj and the Shadow of their Senas is a political non-fiction book written by journalist Dhaval Kulkarni and published by Penguin Random House. The book is about the cousins Thackeray: - Shiv Sena leader Uddhav Thackeray and MNS leader Raj Thackeray.

== About ==
The book is written by journalist and reporter Dhava Kulkarni and was published by Penguin Random House in 2019. It has 299 pages and consists of 10 chapters.

== Background ==
Politics of Maharashtra, a state in western India, was influenced by Bal Thackeray who founded the Shiv Sena, political party, which later went on to rule the state. The book starts with the history of Thackeray family, particularly focusing on Prabodhankar Thackeray, the father of Bal Thackeray, and his socio-political activism in Mumbai and Maharashtra.

In the later chapters, the book mentions factors which led to foundation of Shiv sena, its politics, and its alliance with BJP. Subsequently, book explores the life of The Thackeray Cousins—Uddhav and Raj—their politics and working style. Later, the book has details about formation of the Maharashtra Navnirman Sena and its role in contemporary history.

The book, according to the author, examines "identity politics, and the social, cultural and economic matrix that catalysed the formation of the Shiv Sena and the MNS from it".

== Reviews ==
Meena Menon reviewed the book for Firstpost and wrote that the book "fills the breach with interviews from a spectrum of journalists, politicians, and intellectuals to present a contemporary analysis of the two heirs to Bal Thackeray." She observed that book draws "emotional politics" out of Shivsena and author focuses on "micropolitics".

Gaurav Kanthwal, in a review for The Tribune, wrote that "the book is not just about two supremos and their militias, it also maps Maharashtra, particularly Mumbai, through the matrix of culture, economy, politics, and geography." Sushila Ravindranath noted that author summarises personalities of cousins Thackerays in this book while writing for The Asian Age.
