= Thackeray (film) =

- Theatrical release poster
- Directed by: Abhijit Panse
- Written by: Arvind Jagtap
- Screenplay by: Abhijit Panse
- Story by: Sanjay Raut
- Based on: Bal Thackeray
- Produced by: Viacom18 Motion Pictures; Shrikant Bhasi; Varsha Sanjay Raut; Purvashi Sanjay Raut; Vidhita Sanjay Raut
- Starring: Nawazuddin Siddiqui; Amrita Rao
- Cinematography: Sudeep Chatterjee
- Edited by: Ashish Mahatrae; Apurva Motivale
- Music by: Songs: Rohan-Rohan; Sandeep Shirodkar; Score: Amar Mohile
- Production companies: Viacom 18 Motion Pictures; Raut'ers Entertainment; Carnival Motion Pictures
- Distributed by: Viacom18 Motion Pictures
- Release date: 25 January 2019
- Running time: 139 minutes
- Country: India
- Languages: Marathi; Hindi
- Budget: ₹30 crore
- Box office: est. ₹31.6 crore

Thackeray is a 2019 Indian biographical film written and directed by Abhijit Panse and made simultaneously in Marathi and Hindi. The film follows the life of Bal Thackeray, the founder of the Indian political party Shiv Sena. The film stars Nawazuddin Siddiqui as Thackeray and Amrita Rao as his wife. The film released on 25 January 2019, right after the 93rd birthday of Bal Thackeray.

== Plot ==
The film is a Biographical film based on Indian politician Bal Thackeray .

== Cast ==
- Nawazuddin Siddiqui as Bal Thackeray
- Amrita Rao as Meena Thackeray
- Mukund Gosavi as Prabodhankar Thackeray
- Sachin A. Jayavant as Uddhav Thackeray
- Vishal Sudarshanwar as Raj Thackeray
- Rajesh Khera as Morarji Desai
- Sanjay Narvekar as Krishna Desai
- Pravin Tarde as Dattaji Salvi
- Sandeep Khare as Manohar Joshi
- Prakash Belawadi as George Fernandes
- Nikhil Mahajan as Sharad Pawar
- Avantika Akerekar as Indira Gandhi
- Sudhir Mishra as Haji Mastan
- Sanjay Kulkarni as Diwakar Raote
- Mohaniraj Khare as Pramod Navalkar
- Prabhakar More as Wamanrao Mahadik
- Ashok Lokhande as Yashwantrao Chavan
- Praful Samant as Vasantrao Naik
- Abdul Quadir Amin as Jaidev Thackeray
- Vidyadhar Paranjape as Subhash Desai
- Balaji Deshpande as Rajni Patel
- Anand Vikas Potdukhe as Jambuwantrao Dhote
- Anil Sutar as Dada Kondke
- Chetan Sharma as Dilip Vengsarkar
- Ashish Pathode as Javed Miandad
- Jaywant Wadkar as Police officer
- Vineet Sharma as DCP Emmanuel Modak

== Soundtrack ==
Thackeray

Soundtrack album by Rohan-Rohan and Sandeep Shirodkar
- Released: 15 January 2019
- Recorded: 2018
- Genre: Feature Film Soundtrack
- Length: 17:04
- Label: Zee Music Company
External audio
- Audio Jukebox on YouTube
Rohan-Rohan chronology
Sanju (2018)	Thackeray (2019)	Kissebaaz (2019)
Sandeep Shirodkar chronology
Baaghi 2 (2018)	Thackeray (2019)	Housefull 4 (2019)

The music of the film was composed by Rohan-Rohan and Sandeep Shirodkar with lyrics by Dr Sunil Jogi, Manoj Yadav and Manndar Cholkar. The film's score was composed by Amar Mohile.

Track listing
No.	Title	Lyrics	Singer(s)	Length
1.	"Saheb Tu Sarkar Tu"	Manoj Yadav	Sukhwinder Singh	5:25
2.	"Aaple Saheb Thackeray"	Manndar Cholkar	Avadhoot Gupte	4:33
3.	"Aaya Re Thackeray"	Dr Sunil Jogi	Nakash Aziz	4:33
4.	"Thackeray Theme" (Music by Sandeep Shirodkar)	Instrumental	Sandeep Shirodkar	2:33
Total length:				17:04

== Reception ==
=== Critical response ===
On the review aggregator website Rotten Tomatoes, 20% of 10 critics' reviews are positive, with an average rating of 4.3/10.

Thackeray received mixed reviews from critics. Times of India gave the film 3 stars out of 5 and states: "While the honesty is commendable, it comes across that the lead character's political motivations lack clarity. Perhaps a more seasoned writer, could have fleshed out Thackeray's characters and eccentricities a lot better. But, its Nawaz's nonchalant performance that overshadows the flaws and leaves a lasting impact."

Times Now went with 2.5 stars out of 5 and has to say: "A lot of focus is put on making the film a tearjerker by emphasizing the aftermath of the riots, violence and fights that pretty much summed up Shiv Sena's history under the guidance of founder, Bal Thackeray. The film is good because of Nawazuddin's performance but it cannot be considered as one of the best biopics ever created."

The life time domestic Box office collection is ₹316 million (US$3.3 million) as per Taran Adarsh. Raut also plans to continue the film with a sequel.

=== Controversy ===
Actor Siddharth has slammed Bal Thackeray for abusing South Indians.

“Nawazuddin has repeated 'Uthao lungi bajao pungi' (lift the lungi and *'#$ him) in the film #Thackeray. Clearly hate speech against South Indians... In a film glorifying the person who said it! Are you planning to make money out of this propaganda? Stop selling hate! Scary stuff!"
