= Rashmi Thackeray =

Indian journalist

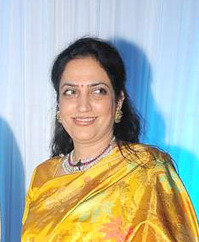

Spouse of the Chief Minister of Maharashtra
- In office 28 November 2019 – 29 June 2022
- Chief Minister: Uddhav Thackeray
- Preceded by: Amruta Fadnavis
- Succeeded by: Lata Shinde

Editor-in-chief of Saamana and Marmik
- Incumbent
- Assumed office 2020
- Preceded by: Uddhav Thackeray

Personal details
- Born: Rashmi Patankar; 29.02.1963 Dabhol, Ratnagiri district, Maharashtra, India
- Spouse: Uddhav Thackeray (m. 1989)
- Children: 2, including Aaditya Thackeray
- Relatives: See Thackeray Family
- Education: B. Com.
- Alma mater: Vinayak Ganesh Vaze Autonomous College of Arts, Science & Commerce, Mulund East
- Occupation: Journalist

Rashmi Thackeray (née Patankar) is an Indian journalist and the editor-in-chief of Saamana and Marmik. She is the spouse of Former Chief Minister of Maharashtra, Uddhav Thackeray and the mother of Aaditya Thackeray.

== Early life and family ==
The daughter of businessman Madhav Patankar of Dombivli, she attended V G Vaze College in Mulund for her Bachelor of Commerce degree. She joined the Life Insurance Corporation of India as a contract employee in 1987. A friend of Raj Thackeray's sister, Jaywanti, she met Uddhav Thackeray. The couple got married in 1989. The couple have two sons, Aditya (Former Cabinet Minister of Tourism and Environment Government of Maharashtra) and Tejas.
