= Shiv Sena campaign for the 2019 Maharashtra Legislative Assembly election =

- Affiliation: Shiv Sena
- Status: Seat Sharing Announcement:4 October 2019
- Key people: Uddhav Thackeray (Shiv Sena President) Aaditya Thackeray (Yuva Sena President) Anil Desai (Shivsena National Secretary)
- Slogans: Hich Ti Vel, Nava Maharashtra Ghadavinaychi("This is the Time, to make a New Maharashtra")

The Shiv Sena is one of the major political parties the Indian state of Maharashtra; it shares power in Maharashtra and is the coalition partner of the Bharatiya Janata Party in Maharashtra, It contested the 2019 Maharashtra Legislative Assembly election along with the Alliance partner Bharatiya Janata Party, the Shiv Sena contested on 124 seats and the Bharatiya Janata Party contested on 164 seats.

== Background ==
Months before the Election took Place, the Shiv Sena President Uddhav Thackeray had meeting with poll strategist and former JD(U) leader Prashant Kishor discussing the strategy for Shivsena in the Vidhan Sabha Election. Finally, it was official that Prashant Kishor and his company I-PAC shall be assisting the Sena for its Campaign for th 2019 Maharashtra Legislative Assembly election.

== The Campaign ==
The Shiv Sena having its strong presence on ground level, started preparations for the elections just after 2019 Indian general election were over, The Sena was working in strengthening its base on its weak subjects like Vidarbha, Western Maharashtra etc. The Sena's campaign primarily aimed to project Aaditya Thackeray as Leader

The Shiv Sena had the following Campaigns for the 2019 Maharashtra Legislative Assembly election,

1. Aditya Samwad
2. Jan Ashirwad Yatra
3. Friends of Aditya
4. Pratham Ti
5. Mi Maharashtra
6. Hich Ti Vel

== Aditya Samwad ==
Through 12 such Events, 15 lakh people were directly reached on ground and over 1-crore digital impressions were generated, Aditya Samwad was successful in gaining trust from the youth all over Maharashtra and addressing their problems at ground level. Prashant Kishor led I-PAC worked on making Aditya Samwad reach more and more to the commoners, I-PAC also made sure that the programme is well on Social Media.

== Friends of Aditya ==
"Friends of Aditya" was initiated to strengthen the Sena's Outreach in Posh and Urban Areas, Friends of Aditya saw Social Influencers, City People and Urban Support groups attending in large numbers, Celebrities like actor Dino Morea were also a part of it.

The ''Friends of Aditya" was Townhall Styled and also contained Digital Interactions by Aditya Thackeray.

== Pratham Ti ==
"Pratham Ti" was the campaign which was designed to be Women Centric, in this campaign Shivsena leaders addressed Women specific issues and discussed ways to improve women participation in Maharashtra politics. The Campaign was headed by Top Women leaders of Shiv Sena by directly engaging with women across the state through series of direct interactive meetings. The Sena also included the topic of women in their manifesto, the campaign was also aimed to fortify Shiv Sena's credentials as a women centric party.

== Jan Ashirwad Yatra ==
The Shivsena launched Jan Ashirwad Yatra from Jalgaon in July 2019, touring 4000 km Journey across Maharashtra to strengthen Shiv Sena's Public Outreach and energize its cadre across Maharashtra, The Jan Ashirwad Yatra was spearheaded by Aaditya Thackeray. Under the Jan Ashirwad Yatra over 165 Mass Public Events and 300 Special Activities were carried out.

Special Ground level Chowk Sabhas and Gram Sabhas were also carried out, with mass public support, The Jan Ashirwad Yatra was also aimed to reach out Farmers and those who previously didn't vote for the Party.

== Mi Maharashtra ==
"Mi Maharashtra" campaign was initiated to boost Shivsena Cadre's spirit across Maharashtra. The Campaign was aimed at reinforcing "Marathi Pride" through a high-octane campaign led by top Marathi leaders of the Party in crucial habitations. Fiery speeches were made in a series of symbolic stage shows to evoke the "Shiv Sainik Spirit".

The "Mi Maharashtra" campaign saw 37,500 attendees and reached over 75,000 people in just 10 days.

== Hich Ti Vel ==
"Hich Ti Vel" was the main umbrella campaign through which the entire party mobilised to convey Shiv Sena's development agenda for Maharashtra. 127 Key leaders held 50 Road Shows and 250 Jansabhas, Shivsena's Cadre and volunteer propagated 10 key agenda points through door-to-door campaigns across 40 lakh households with a unique reach of over 2 crore people. 62 Video Vans were deployed across 25,000 Villages that reached over 2.5 crore citizens.

== Results ==
Region	Total seats	Shiv Sena	
Western Maharashtra	70	08	▼05
Vidarbha	62	04	Steady
Marathwada	46	11	Steady
Thane+Konkan	39	17	▲03
Mumbai	36	14	Steady
North Maharashtra	35	5	▼02
Total	288	56	-7

The Shiv Sena won 56 seats out of 124 seats it contested in Maharashtra, though the Sena won 7 seats less than its previous election results, the Shiv Sena became successful in establishing a base in Rural and Urban Areas of Maharashtra.
