= Lokmat Stylish Awards =

Annual awards

- Awarded for: Outstanding work in the most Stylish categories
- Venue: JW Marriott, Juhu, Mumbai
- Country: India
- Hosted by: Manish Paul
- First award: 2016; 10 years ago

Lokmat Stylish Awards are Indian awards presented by Lokmat Media Pvt. Ltd. to acknowledge the style statement of leaders in their respective fields including politics, business, sports, lifestyle, and the entertainment industry. The awards were started in 2016 by the media company. Lokmat Stylish Awards 2022 was the sixth edition of the Awards. The award event was organized on 28 September 2022, at JW Marriott in Juhu, Mumbai. The event was hosted by television actor and presenter Manish Paul. The 7th edition was held on 12 September 2023 at ST. Regis in Lower Parel, Mumbai.

== History ==
Lokmat Stylish award’s concept was developed by Rishi Darda, Joint Managing Director & Editorial Director of Lokmat Media Group. These awards were started to honor the style statement of individuals beyond the entertainment industry. The goal of these awards is to acknowledge the talent and creativity of individuals from different sectors. The first edition was attended by then Chief Minister of Maharashtra Devendra Fadnavis and politician Aaditya Thackeray. The first edition of the award was held in 2016. Since then, 6 editions of the awards have been completed. The awards are organized in Mumbai every year.

== Winners ==
=== 2022 ===
Winners of the 6th edition
Category	Winner(s)	Ref.
Lokmat Most Stylish Legend	Jackie Shroff	
Lokmat Most Stylish Timeless Icon	Raveena Tandon	
Lokmat Most Stylish OTT Actor of the year	Abhishek Bachchan	
Lokmat Most Stylish Versatile Actor (Female)	Vidya Balan	
Lokmat Most Stylish Power Couple	Genelia D'Souza, Riteish Deshmukh	
Lokmat Most Stylish Power Icon	Shraddha Kapoor	
Lokmat Most Stylish Youth Icon	Rashmika Mandanna	
Lokmat Most Stylish OTT Star	Radhika Apte	
Lokmat Most Stylish Gen Z Star	Ananya Panday	
Lokmat Most Stylish Game changer	Mrunal Thakur	
Lokmat Most Stylish Path Breaker	Huma Qureshi	
Lokmat Most Stylish Performer	Nushrratt Bharuccha	
Lokmat Most Stylish Breakthrough Performer	Maniesh Paul	
Lokmat Most Stylish Politician	Amit Thackeray	
Lokmat Most Stylish Director	Madhur Bhandarkar	
Lokmat Most Stylish Fashion Designer	Kunal Rawal	
Lokmat Most Stylish Content Creator	Sanket Mehta	
Lokmat Most Stylish Dancing Sensation	Awez Darbar	
Lokmat Most Stylish Youth Icon (Male)	CarryMinati	
Most Stylish Fashion Icon (Female)	Tamannaah Bhatia	

=== 2023 ===
Winners of the 7th edition
Category	Winner(s)	Ref.
Most Stylish Youth Icon (Male)	Ishaan Khatter	
Most Stylish Youth Icon (Female)	Pooja Hegde	
Most Stylish Choreographer	Terence Lewis	
Most Stylish Glamorous Diva	Esha Gupta	
Most Stylish Trendsetter (Male)	Randeep Hooda	
Most Stylish Trendsetter (Female)	Nushrratt Bharuccha	
Most Stylish Breakthrough Talent	Radhika Madan	
Most Stylish Iconic Fashionista	Malaika Arora	
Most Stylish Promising Actress	Rakul Preet Singh	
Most Stylish Power Icon	Shilpa Shetty	
Most Stylish OTT Debutant	Maniesh Paul	
Most Stylish Humanitarian	Sonu Sood	
Most Stylish Glam Icon	Ananya Panday	
Most Stylish Singer	Shilpa Rao	
Most Stylish Action Star	Tiger Shroff	
Most Stylish Timeless Icon	Suniel Shetty	
Most Stylish Gen Z Performer	Saiee Manjrekar	
Most Stylish Producer	Jackky Bhagnani	
Most Stylish Path Breaker (Male)	Sharad Kelkar	
Most Stylish Path Breaker (Female)	Mouni Roy	
Most Stylish Gamechanger	Sanya Malhotra	
