= Bharatiya Chitrapat Sena =

Sub organisation of Shiv Sena

The Bharatiya Chitrapat Sena (Indian Film Industry Army) is a sub organization of the Shiv Sena which manages operations in the business of cinema of India.

Long before the establishment of the BCS as an independent organization, Shiv Sena still included film operations among its activities.

In 2011 the organization requested that singer Lata Mangeshkar not be the subject of ridicule.

In 2013 the BCS announced plans to acquire and operate multiple film organizations.

In 2018 the organization requested that no film company produce a biography of the life of Bal Thackeray.
