= Prabodhankar Thackeray =

Indian activist

Prabodhankar Keshav Sitaram Thackeray
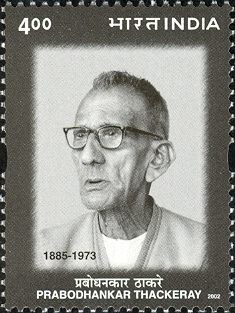
- Thackeray on a 2002 stamp of India
- Born: Keshav Sitaram Panvelkar; 17 September 1885; Panvel, Bombay Presidency, British India (present-day Maharashtra, India)
- Died: 20 November 1973 (aged 88); Bombay, Maharashtra, India
- Other name: Keshav Sitaram Dhodapkar
- Education: University of Calcutta
- Occupations: Writer; politician; social activist
- Movement: Samyukta Maharashtra Movement
- Spouse: Ramabai Thackeray
- Children: 8, including Bal Thackeray
- Father: Sitaram Thackeray
- Relatives: See Thackeray Family

Keshav Sitaram Thackeray (17 September 1885 – 20 November 1973; Keshav Sitaram Panvelkar, also known as Keshav Sitaram Thakre and Keshav Sitaram Dhodapkar, but commonly known by his pen name Prabodhankar Thackeray), was an Indian social reformer, writer and politician. He campaigned against superstitions, untouchability, child marriage and dowry. He was also a prolific author.

He was one of the key leaders of the Samyukta Maharashtra Samiti which successfully campaigned for the linguistic state of Maharashtra. He was the father of Bal Thackeray, who founded the Shiv Sena, a pro-Marathi leader. He is also the paternal grandfather of former Shiv Sena chief and Chief minister of Maharashtra Uddhav Thackeray and Maharashtra Navnirman Sena chief Raj Thackeray. There is a school in Pune named after him.

== Early life ==
Keshav Thackeray (born Keshav Panvelkar) was born on 17 September 1885 in Panvel in a Chandraseniya Kayastha Prabhu family, a community with its roots in Northwest India. According to his autobiography Mazhi Jeevangatha, one of his ancestors was a Killedar of the Dhodap fort during the Maratha rule. His great-grandfather Krushnaji Madhav Dhodapkar ("Appasaheb") resided in Pali, Raigad, while his grandfather Ramchandra "Bhikoba" Dhodapkar settled in Panvel. Keshav's father Sitaram was born Sitaram Ramchandra Dhodapkar but he adopted the surname "Panvelkar" after growing up, as per the tradition, but while admitting his son in the school, he gave him the surname "Thakre", which was supposedly their original family name before "Dhodapkar". An admirer of the India-born British writer William Makepeace Thackeray, Keshav later anglicized the spelling of his surname to "Thackeray".

When Keshav was still a teenager, his father died in a plague epidemic, in 1902. Keshav was educated at Panvel, Kalyan, Baramati and Bombay (now Mumbai). Outside the Bombay Presidency, he studied at the Victoria High School in Dewas (Central Provinces), and later, at the Calcutta University. He finally settled in Bombay.

Keshav Thackeray had two brothers: Vinayakrao Thackeray and Yeshwant Thackeray.

== Social and political activism ==
Keshav Thackeray's own Chandraseniya Kayastha Prabhu (CKP) caste was ranked below the Brahmins as per Manu's caste hierarchy, but he refused to accept this old social hierarchy. He is often described as a social activist or social reformer for his rejection of the caste system, and especially of brahmin authority.

When the prominent Marathi historian VK Rajwade questioned the upper-caste Kshatriya status claimed by the CKPs in a 1916 essay, Thackeray became one of his fiercest critics, and denounced his research as casteist and laid scathing attacks on the origins of Chitpavan Brahmins, questioning their Brahmin status. He wrote a text outlining the identity of the CKP caste, and its contributions to the Maratha Empire. In this text, Gramanyachya Sadhyant Itihas, Thackeray talked about the discrimination suffered by other communities at the hands of the Brahmins during the Maratha rule. He was not much concerned about the ritual caste status, but sought to prove that many non-Brahmin communities (specifically the CKPs) had played a major role in the history of the Maratha Empire. He wrote that the CKPs "provided the cement" for Shivaji's swaraj (self-rule) "with their blood", and supported him even before the Kshatriyas of Rajput origin joined him. Thackeray also replied to him in the Marathi book Kodandache Tanatkar (1918). Thackeray was supported in his defence by another writer Keshav Trimbak Gupte who replied to Rajwade in his sanskrit and Marathi book Rajwadyanchi Gagabhatti(1919) in which he produced verbatim the letters written by the Shankaracharya in 1830 formally endorsing the CKPs Kshatriya status by referring to them as Chandraseniya Kshatriyas and letters from Banares Brahmins (1779, 1801) and Pune Brahmins ratified by Bajirao II himself in 1796 that gave them privilege over the Vedas.

Prabodhankar with his followers would ridicule the social evil of dowry by having a fake marriage procession, wearing entirely black, and following a donkey with a wedding head-band carrying the message, A person taking dowry is going for a marriage. Some Brahmins sued him for his anti-dowry demonstrations but the British Judge supported him by asking: 'Why is the police harassing Prabodhankar when he is fighting for a good cause?'

Keshav Thackeray played an important role in the Sanyukta Maharashtra movement aimed at establishing the linguistic state of Maharashtra. He joined the movement in 1951, demanding the inclusion of the Dang district in Maharashtra instead of neighbouring Gujarat state. He was one of the founding members of the Sanyukta Maharashtra Samiti, which campaigned for the formation of Maharashtra and the inclusion of Belgaum and Mumbai in it.

== Literary career ==
Keshav Thackeray wrote in the Marathi language. He started a fortnightly magazine named Prabodhan ("Enlighten"), which is the origin of his pen name Prabodhankar. His other Marathi language works include the following:

Autobiography

- Mazhi Jeevangatha ("My autobiography")

Historical research

- Pratapsingh Chhatrapati and Rango Bapuji
- Gramanyachya Sadhyant Itihas Arthat Nokarashiche Banda (A Comprehensive History of Rebellion or the Revolt of the Bureaucrats), published by Yashwant Shivram Raje in 1919, at Mumbai
- Bhikshushahiche Band
- Kodandacha Tanatkar
- The Life and Mission of Samarth Ramdas

Opinion

- Dagalbaaj Shivaji
- Devalacha dharma aani dharmaachi devale

Translation

- Hindu janancha rhaas aani adhapaat
- Shanimahatmya
- Shetkaryanche Swarajya (The self-rule of the farmers)

Plays

- Khara Brahman
- Sangeet Vidhinishedh
- Taklele Por
- Sangeet Seetashuddhi

Biographies

- Shri Sant Gadgebaba
- Pandit Ramabai Saraswati

Collected Articles

- Uth Marathya Uth (Arise Marathi People Arise; This is a collection of his 12 articles which appeared in the weekly 'Marmik', following the establishment of Shiv Sena, first published in 1973, it will be published again in 2013 by 'Navta Book World')

== Personal life ==
Keshav Thackeray's wife was Ramabai Thackeray, who died around 1943. They had 8 children: Bal Thackeray, Shrikant Thackeray (father of Raj Thackeray), Ramesh Thackeray, Prabhavati (Pama) Tipnis, Sarla Gadkari, Susheela Gupte, Sanjeevani Karandikar, and Sudha Sule.

== Accolades ==
Maharashtra Chief Minister Devendra Fadnavis unveiled a portrait of Prabodhankar inside the hall at BMC, which he said was long overdue. Fadnavis said "Prabodhankar Ji fought against all the odds when the society was in the grip of illiteracy, untouchability, superstitions, and created an atmosphere of public opinion against these social evils". His grandson Uddhav Thackeray also outlined the social reformist contributions by his grandfather in the abolishing of child marriage, untouchability and enabling women empowerment.
