= Amit Thackeray =

Indian politician

- अमित ठाकरे
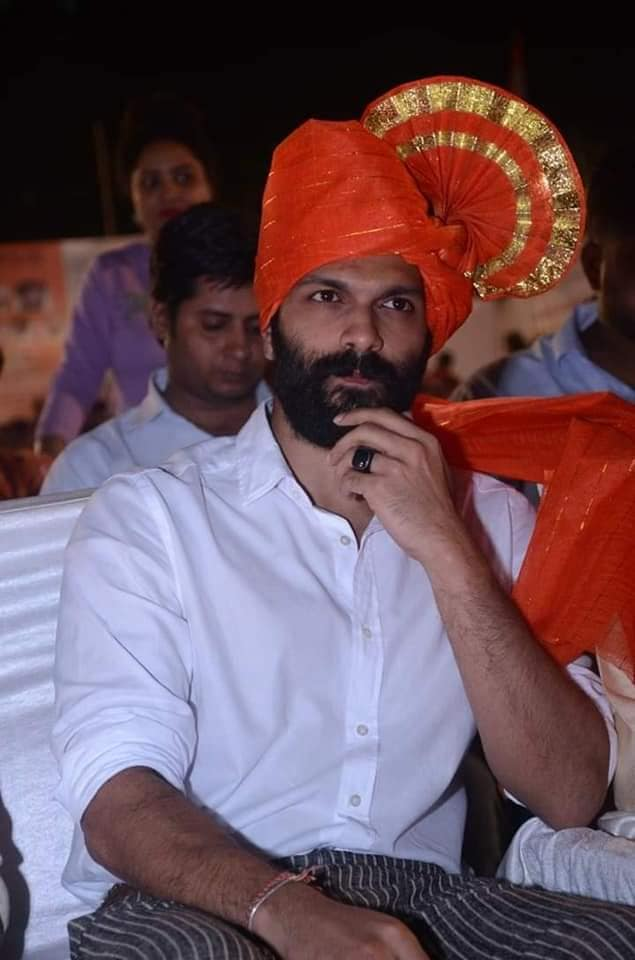

President, Maharashtra Navnirman Vidyarthi Sena
- Incumbent
- Assumed office 27 February 2022

Leader, Maharashtra Navnirman Sena
- Incumbent
- Assumed office 23 January 2020

Personal details
- Born: May 24, 1992 (age 34)
- Party: Maharashtra Navnirman Sena
- Spouse: Mitali Borude
- Parents: Raj Thackeray (father); Sharmila Thackeray (mother)
- Relatives: Thackeray family, Uravshi Thackeray (sister)

Amit Raj Thackeray is an Indian politician associated with the Maharashtra Navnirman Sena (MNS). He serves as a Leader of the Maharashtra Navnirman Sena and as president of the Maharashtra Navnirman Vidyarthi Sena (MNVS), the student wing of the party. He is the son of MNS founder Raj Thackeray. He came to wider public attention through organisational work within the party, statewide youth outreach campaigns, and his candidature in the 2024 Maharashtra Legislative Assembly election from Mahim Assembly constituency in Mumbai.

== Early life and family ==
Amit Thackeray was born in Mumbai, Maharashtra, India. He is the son of Raj Thackeray and Sharmila Thackeray and belongs to the Thackeray family.

He married Mitali Borude in January 2019 in Mumbai.

== Political career ==
=== Appointment as MNS Leader ===
At the Maharashtra Navnirman Sena's Maha Adhiveshan held in Mumbai on 23 January 2020, party president Raj Thackeray appointed Amit Thackeray as a Leader of the Maharashtra Navnirman Sena, marking his formal entry into active politics.

=== Maharashtra Navnirman Vidyarthi Sena ===
Amit Thackeray has been associated with the Maharashtra Navnirman Sena since his youth. He was appointed president of the Maharashtra Navnirman Vidyarthi Sena (MNVS), the student wing of the MNS, and has led several organisational initiatives focused on expanding the party's youth presence across Maharashtra.

In 2022, he launched the party's Mahasampark Abhiyan, a statewide outreach programme aimed at strengthening the organisation of the student wing and reconnecting with young voters. The campaign involved extensive tours across Maharashtra and received coverage from national and regional media.

Political observers described the campaign as part of the Maharashtra Navnirman Sena's attempt to revive and expand its organisational base following electoral setbacks.

=== Growing public profile and Media Coverage ===
Beginning in the early 2020s, Thackeray took on a more visible role within the MNS. Media reports noted his increasing participation in public programmes, organisational meetings, and party campaigns across Maharashtra.

Since entering active politics in 2020, Thackeray has been the subject of profile and analytical coverage in several national publications. Commentators have discussed his organisational role within the Maharashtra Navnirman Sena, his leadership of the Maharashtra Navnirman Vidyarthi Sena, and his emergence as a member of a new generation of leaders within the Thackeray political family.

=== 2024 Maharashtra Legislative Assembly election ===
In October 2024, the Maharashtra Navnirman Sena nominated Thackeray as its candidate from the Mahim Assembly constituency in Mumbai. The election marked his electoral debut and attracted significant media attention because of the constituency's political importance and the presence of candidates from multiple major parties.

National and regional media extensively covered the contest, describing it as one of the most closely watched races of the Maharashtra Assembly election because it involved the electoral debut of Raj Thackeray's son and featured candidates from rival Shiv Sena factions.

Thackeray finished third in the election with 33,062 votes (24.56%). The seat was won by Mahesh Sawant of Shiv Sena (UBT), who received 50,213 votes, while Shiv Sena candidate Sada Sarvankar finished second with 48,897 votes.

The Mahim constituency attracted significant attention during the 2024 Maharashtra Legislative Assembly election due to Thackeray's electoral debut and the triangular contest involving candidates from rival Shiv Sena factions.

=== Political positions and activities ===
Thackeray has spoken on issues relating to student welfare, employment, urban governance, public transport, law and order, and drug trafficking.

In April 2025, he called for stronger enforcement measures against narcotics networks and advocated granting greater operational freedom to Law enforcement agencies to combat drug trafficking.

In 2025, he commented on discussions regarding possible political cooperation between the Maharashtra Navnirman Sena and Shiv Sena (UBT), stating that any alliance would depend on discussions between the leadership of the two parties.

In August 2026, Thackeray criticised the Maharashtra government's decision to extend the deadline for auto-rickshaw and taxi drivers to acquire functional knowledge of Marathi. He warned that MNS workers would take action against drivers who spoke Hindi or behaved rudely with passengers, saying that the MNS would insist on the use of Marathi.

== Controversies ==
=== Nerul Shivaji Maharaj statue incident ===
In November 2025, a case was registered against Thackeray and nearly 70 Maharashtra Navnirman Sena workers after they allegedly forcibly unveiled a covered statue of Chhatrapati Shivaji Maharaj in Nerul, Navi Mumbai, despite police objections and without permission for the unveiling. Thackeray later accepted a police notice in connection with the incident and said that he was happy that his first political case involved fighting for Shivaji Maharaj.

=== Removal of Narendra Modi's portrait ===
On 31 August 2026, during a visit to Government Polytechnic College in Shivajinagar, Pune, Thackeray objected to a portrait of Prime Minister Narendra Modi displayed alongside portraits of Chhatrapati Shivaji Maharaj and B. R. Ambedkar. According to the police complaint, a person accompanying Thackeray removed the portrait after Thackeray objected to its placement. Police subsequently registered a case against Thackeray and 20–25 others in connection with the incident.

Thackeray subsequently said that he was proud of removing the portrait. Three people were arrested in connection with the incident, according to police.

== Electoral History ==
Electoral History
Year	Election	Constituency	Party	Position	Result
2024	Maharashtra Legislative Assembly	Mahim	Maharashtra Navnirman Sena	3rd	Lost

== See also ==
- Raj Thackeray
- Maharashtra Navnirman Sena
- Thackeray family
