= Marmik =

Indian weekly published by the Shiv Sena

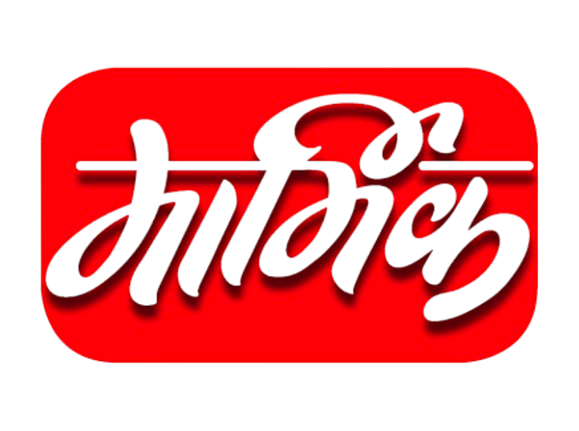
- Type: Political weekly
- Format: Cartoons
- Owner(s): Thackeray Family
- Founder(s): Bal Thackeray; Shrikant Thackeray
- Founded: 13 August 1960; 65 years ago
- Political alignment: Shiv Sena (1966-2022); Shiv Sena (UBT) (since 2022)
- Language: Marathi
- Headquarters: Ranade Road, Mumbai, Maharashtra
- Circulation: Maharashtra and other Marathi speaking regions
- Sister newspapers: Saamana
- Website: www.emarmik.com

Marmik (transl. Straight from the heart) is an Indian weekly published by the Shiv Sena from Mumbai, until publication of its daily Saamana. It is seen as the frontrunner or launchpad for the Shiv Sena. It focused on issues of common Marathi man or Marathi Manoos including unemployment, influx of migrant, retrenchment of Marathi workers. Its office at Ranade Road became the rallying point for Marathi youth. It was Marmik issue on 5 June 1966 which first announced the launch of membership for the Shiv Sena. Bal Thackeray later stated "that not just a cartoon weekly but also the prime reason for the birth and growth of the Sena.".

== History ==
Bal Thackeray, started as a cartoonist for The Free Press Journal. In 1960 when he was 34, he quit his job and started Marmik. He was joined by his younger brother Shrikant Thackeray. It was launched on 13 August 1960 and it was inaugurated by the then Maharashtra chief Minister Yashwantrao Chavan. Thackeray's cartoons used to be published in Marmik. It basically mock maharashtra government policies and raise unemployment issue.
