= Saamana =

Indian Marathi-language newspaper

Saamana सामना
- Type: Daily newspaper
- Format: Broadsheet
- Owner: Thackeray family
- Editor: Uddhav Thackeray
- Associate editor: Sanjay Raut
- Founded: 23 January 1988
- Political alignment: Shiv Sena (1988-2022); Shiv Sena (UBT) (since 2022)
- Language: Marathi; Hindi
- Circulation: Maharashtra
- Website: www.saamana.com

Saamana is a Marathi-language newspaper published in Maharashtra, India. The paper was launched on 23 January 1988 by Bal Thackeray, the founder of the Shiv Sena, a local, regional and language driven; political party; in the Indian state of Maharashtra. A Hindi version of the paper, Dopahar Ka Saamana popularly known as Hindi Saamana, was launched on 23 February 1993.

== History ==
Firstpost attributes the founding of Saamana to Thackeray's dissatisfaction about the amount of press he and his party received in other news outlets. It has been described it as a mouthpiece of the Shiv Sena, providing a link to Thackeray that did not exist previously. Firstpost also reports that while other newspapers allowed bias to creep into their news coverage, Saamana provided relatively unbiased news coverage of government policy and civic matters. It was only news about the Shiv Sena that was biased.

According to the Hindustan Times, Saamana played a "significant role during the 1992–93 riots", and Thackeray was "not beyond publishing lies and exaggerating the extent of the violence indulged in by the opposing groups and inciting Shiv Sainiks to do their worst."

Bal Thackeray edited both newspapers until his death on 17 November 2012. To honour him, Thackeray's son Uddhav Thackeray named him as the "founder-editor".

Until 27 November 2019, the chief editor of Saamana and Dopahar Ka Saamana was Uddhav Thackeray, but when he was elected as Chief Minister of Maharashtra he resigned from this position. Now the executive editor of the Marathi newspaper is Rashmi Thackeray and the resident editor of the Hindi newspaper is Anil Tiwari. The publisher of Dainik Saamana Marathi newspaper is Vivek Kadam.

In September 2020, the newspaper came into controversy for publishing an article with the title 'Tod Diya' which means 'We Broke It' in Hindi. This article referred to the demolition of the office of the Bollywood actress Kangana Ranaut by the Brihanmumbai Municipal Corporation.

== See also ==
- List of Marathi-language newspapers
- List of newspapers in India
