= Dattaji Salvi =

Indian politician and trade unionist

Datta Salvi

Member of Maharashtra Legislative Council
- In office 25 April 1990 – 24 April 1996
- Constituency: Elected by MLAs

Personal details
- Born: 15 June 1918
- Died: 19 February 2002 (aged 83) Mumbai, Maharashtra
- Party: Shiv Sena
- Occupation: Politician

Dattaji Salvi (1918–2002) was a leader of Shiv Sena and a trade unionist. He was a member of Maharashtra Legislative Council and was minister of home and labour in the ministry headed by Manohar Joshi. He died in 2002.
