= Aaditya Thackeray =

Indian politician (born 1990)

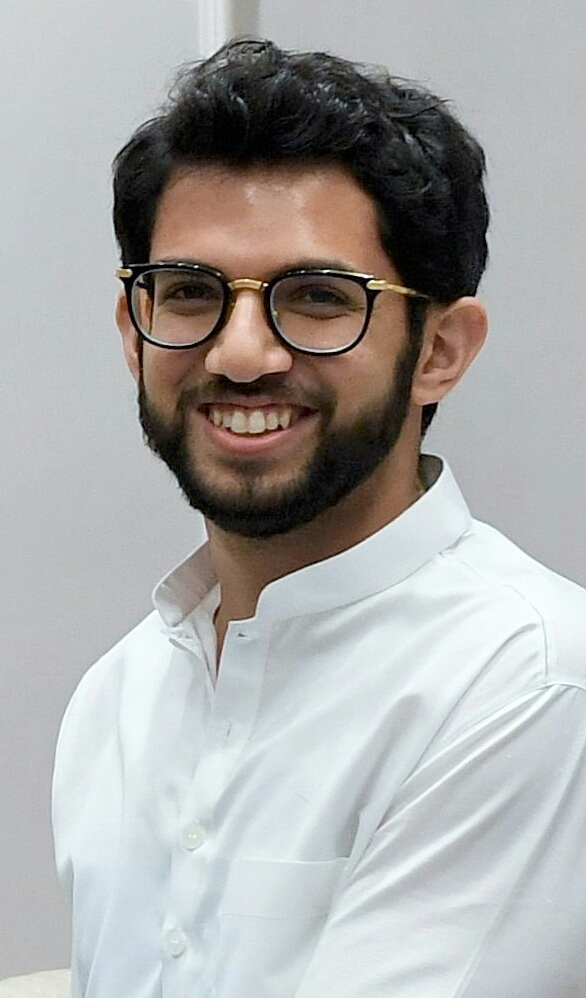
- Thackeray in New Delhi, February 2020

Cabinet Minister Government of Maharashtra
- In office 30 December 2019 – 29 June 2022
- Governor: Bhagat Singh Koshiyari
- Chief Minister: Uddhav Thackeray
- Ministry and Departments: Environment and Climate Change; Tourism; Protocol; Higher Education and Technical Education (additional charge on 27 June 2022)

Guardian Minister of Mumbai Suburban District, Government of Maharashtra
- In office 9 January 2020 – 29 June 2022
- Chief Minister: Uddhav Thackeray
- Preceded by: Vinod Tawde

Member of the Maharashtra Legislative Assembly
- Incumbent
- Assumed office 24 November 2019
- Preceded by: Sunil Govind Shinde
- Constituency: Worli

President of Yuva Sena
- Incumbent
- Assumed office 2010
- Preceded by: Position Created

President of the Mumbai Football Association
- Incumbent
- Assumed office 2017
- Preceded by: Austin Coutinho

Personal details
- Born: Aaditya Uddhav Thackeray; 13 June 1990 (age 36) Mumbai, Maharashtra, India
- Party: Shiv Sena (UBT) (since 2022)
- Other political affiliations: Shiv Sena (until 2022)
- Relations: See Thackeray Family
- Parents: Uddhav Thackeray (father); Rashmi Thackeray (mother)
- Education: Bombay Scottish School
- Alma mater: St. Xavier's (B.A History); KC Law College (LL.B.)
- Occupation: Politician

Aaditya Uddhav Thackeray (born 13 June 1990) is an Indian politician who served as a Cabinet Minister of Higher Education, Cabinet Minister of Tourism and Environment for the Government of Maharashtra. He is also an member of the Maharashtra Legislative Assembly from Worli, Mumbai. He is the son of Uddhav Thackeray, an Indian politician who served as the 19th Chief Minister of Maharashtra, leader of the Shiv Sena (UBT), and grandson of Balasaheb Thackeray. He is the President of Yuva Sena, a youth wing of Shiv Sena. He was a Maharashtra Cabinet minister and was inducted as a cabinet minister in the state cabinet on 30 December 2019.

== Early life ==
Thackeray was born to Uddhav Thackeray and Rashmi. He has a younger brother, Tejas. He completed his schooling from Bombay Scottish School in Mahim, South Mumbai and the Dhirubhai Ambani International School for grades 11 and 12. Thackeray later obtained a BA History degree while studying at St. Xavier's College in Fort, South Mumbai. He obtained his law degree from Kishinchand Chellaram Law College in Churchgate, South Mumbai, where he earned his LLB degree.

== Work ==
His first book of poems, 'My Thoughts in White and Black', was published in 2007. The following year, he turned lyricist and released a private album Ummeed, for which he wrote all the eight songs.

He was involved in or initiated a book burning agitation against inclusion of Rohinton Mistry's book 'Such a Long Journey' in Mumbai University's reading list in 2010. Thackeray alleged that the book included insulting language against Marathis.

== Political career ==
In October 2019, Thackeray contested the 2019 Maharashtra Legislative Assembly election from the Worli constituency in Mumbai and subsequently emerged victorious. In doing so, he became the first member of the Thackeray family to contest and win elections. He became the Cabinet Minister for tourism, protocol and environment on 30 December 2019 in the Uddhav Thackeray-led Maha Vikas Aghadi government.

Prior to getting officially elected, Thackeray played a significant role in several projects during the Devendra Fadnavis-led government, prominently being a ban of single-use plastics in Maharashtra, which was well received by residents of the state.

== Positions held ==
- 2010: Appointed President of Yuva Sena.
- 2017: Elected as President of Mumbai District Football Association.
- 2018: Appointed Leader of Shiv Sena Party.
- 2019: MLA from Worli constituency.
- 2019: Cabinet Minister of Environment, Tourism and Protocol, Government of Maharashtra.
- 2020: Appointed guardian minister of Mumbai Suburban district.
- 2024: MLA from Worli constituency
- 24 November 2024: Shiv Sena (UBT)‘s Legislature party leader

== See also ==
- Political families of Maharashtra
- Political families of India
