= Maharashtra Navnirman Sena =

Political party in India

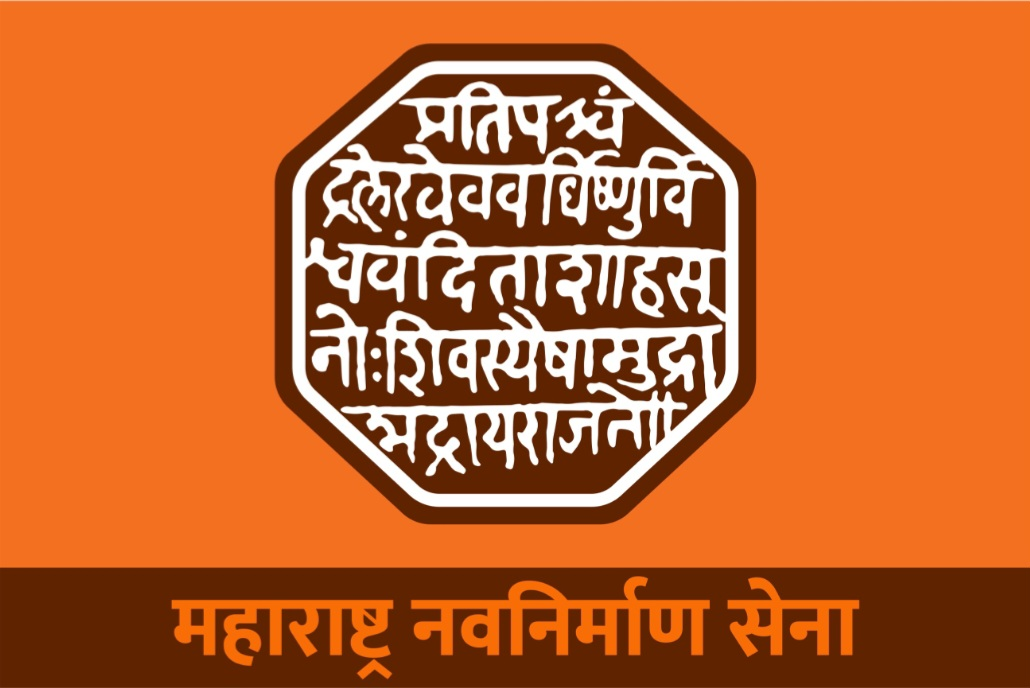
- Abbreviation: MNS
- President: Raj Thackeray
- Founder: Raj Thackeray
- Founded: 9 March 2006 (20 years ago)
- Split from: Shiv Sena
- Headquarters: Rajgad, 2nd Floor, Matoshri Towers, Shivaji Park, Dadar, Mumbai, MH 400028
- Ideology: Marathi regionalism Hindutva; Ultranationalism; Right-wing populism Nativism
- Political position: Far-right
- ECI status: Recognised political party
- Seats in Rajya Sabha: 0 / 245
- Seats in Lok Sabha: 0 / 543
- Seats in Maharashtra Legislative Council: 0 / 78
- Seats in Maharashtra Legislative Assembly: 0 / 288
- Number of states and union territories in government: 0 / 31

Election symbol
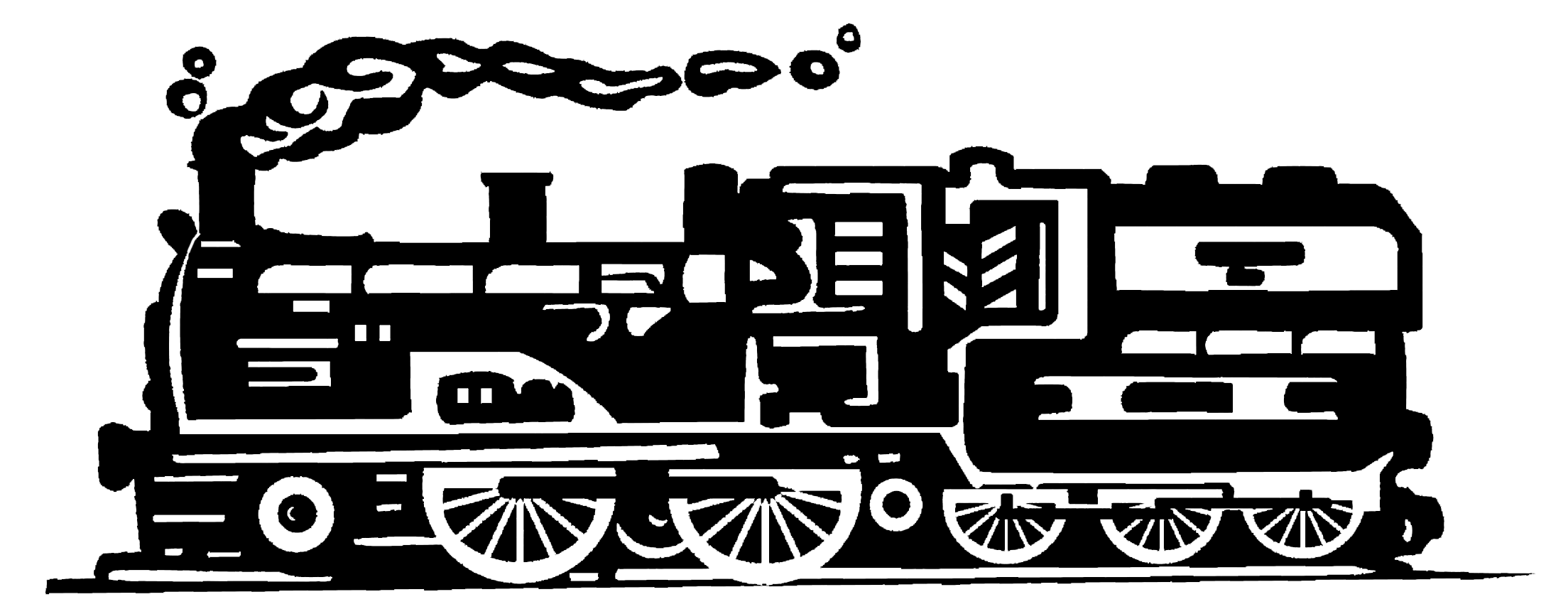

Website
- MNS Blueprint; MNS Adhikrut

The Maharashtra Navnirman Sena (MNS; lit. 'Maharashtra Reformation Army') is an Indian far-right Marathi regionalist and Hindutva political party. It was founded on 9 March 2006 in Mumbai by Raj Thackeray after he left the Shiv Sena party due to differences with his cousin Uddhav Thackeray, who later became the 19th Chief Minister Of Maharashtra and to his sidelining by the Shiv Sena in major decisions like distribution of election tickets.

MNS won 13 assembly seats (out of 288) in the 2009 assembly elections, which was the first Maharashtra Legislative Assembly election that the party contested. In the elections of Maharashtra Legislative Assembly 2019, MNS won 1 seat. In January 2020, MNS unveiled a new flag, however the symbol on the flag was not used for elections.

== Foundation ==
The party was founded by Raj Thackeray, nephew of late Shiv Sena Bal Thackeray and grandson of Prabodhankar Thackeray. Raj Thackeray resigned from his uncle's party in January 2006 and announced his intention to start a new political party. The reason given by him for breaking away from the Shiv Sena was that the latter was "run by petty clerks" because of which it had "fallen from its former glory". Also, Thackeray declared his motive of building a political awareness for the development related issues of the state and giving them a center stage in national politics.

At the time of the party's foundation, Raj Thackeray stated that he does not want to have hostilities with his uncle who "was, is and always will be (his) mentor".

Although the MNS is a break-away group from the Shiv Sena, the party is still based on Marathi and Bhumiputra ideologies. When unveiling the party in an assembly at Shivaji Park he said, that everyone is anxious to see what will happen to Hindutva. When unveiling, he also said, "I shall elaborate on the party's stance on issues like Sons of Soil and Marathi, its agenda for development of Maharashtra and the significance of the party flag colours at the March 19 public meeting." Raj Thackeray considers himself an Indian nationalist. The party also recognises secularism as one of its core tenets.

== Maharashtra Development Blueprint ==
In September 2014, MNS unveiled its first look of "Maharashtra's Development Blueprint" with the slogan 'Yes, it's possible’. The blueprint discusses party's stance and key ideas on infrastructure, governance, quality of life, growth opportunities and Marathi pride.

== Controversies ==
=== 2008 violence against North Indians in Maharashtra ===
Map showing the various districts of Maharashtra that were affected by Maharashtra Navnirman Sena's violence against North Indians. Maharashtra is shown in red Violence affected districts in dark red Uttar Pradesh in blue Bihar in light blue.

In February 2008, some MNS activists clashed with Samajwadi Party (SP) party workers in Mumbai when Samajwadi Party supporters attended a rally at Shivaji Park, Dadar, Mumbai, a stronghold of MNS, where Samajwadi Party leader Abu Asim Azmi made a fiery speech. After the clashes, 73 MNS activists and 19 SP workers were arrested by Mumbai Police for violence.

On 6 February 2008, reportedly, about 200 MNS members quit the party and joined Shiv Sena due to the anti-north Indian stance of Raj Thackeray.

A petition was filed in the Patna civil court on 8 February against Thackeray for his alleged remarks over Chhath, the most popular festival of Bihar and Eastern Uttar Pradesh (Purvanchal). Mr. Thackeray maintains he is not against Chhath Puja, but against the "show of arrogance" and "Politicization of Chatth Puja" displayed by some people from Bihar and Eastern Uttar Pradesh on this occasion.

On 10 February 2008, MNS workers attacked vendors and shopkeepers from North India in various parts of Maharashtra, and destroyed government property to vent their anger against the reported move to arrest Raj Thackeray. Nashik police detained 26 MNS workers for violence.

In February 2008, Raj Thackeray's speech on the issue of migration into Mumbai from other parts of India created a well-publicised controversy. MNS supporters clashed with activists of the Samajwadi Party leading to street violence. Thackeray also criticised noted film actor turned politician Amitabh Bachchan, a native of Prayagraj in Uttar Pradesh, for business towards Uttar Pradesh because of Amar Singh. Bachchan came into fame and fortune in Mumbai's film industry;– Bollywood.

On 8 September 2008, Infosys Technologies announced that 3,000 employee positions had been shifted from Pune due to construction delays caused earlier that year by MNS attacks on North Indian construction workers in Maharashtra. On 15 October 2008, Thackeray threatened to shut down Jet Airways operations in Maharashtra if they did not rehire probationary employees that had been shed in a cost-cutting move forced by the economic downturn.

In October 2008, MNS activists beat up North Indian candidates appearing for the all-India Railway Recruitment Board entrance exam for the Western region in Mumbai. One Bihari died because of train accident and rioting ensued following coverage in Hindi Media with support from NCP/Congress. In retaliation for the MNS' attack on Biharis and North Indians in general, the Bharatiya Bhojpuri Sangh attacked the residence of a Marathi official of Tata Motors in Jamshedpur. Following the uproar in the Indian parliament, and calls that there was no pressure to arrest the MNS chief, Raj Thackeray was arrested in the early hours of 21 October. He was produced before a court on the day itself and would return the next day after spending the night in jail. Following the arrest, however, MNS party activists took out their anger on parts of Mumbai city and the region at large. The arrest resulted in applause, fear and calls for a ban on the MNS. The Shiv Sena, however, maintained a cool response, although senior party leader Manohar Joshi said they were close to supporting the MNS in their agitation against the non-Marathi candidates for the railway board exam.

=== Clash with Shiv Sena ===
On 10 October 2006 clashes erupted between supporters of Shiv Sena and Maharashtra Navnirman Sena headed by Raj Thackeray. It was alleged that workers of MNS had torn the posters bearing the photographs of Shiv Sena Supremo Bal Thackeray near the SIES college in Mumbai. Later as a retaliation, it was alleged that Shiv Sena workers brought down the hoardings with Raj Thackeray's photo near the Sena Bhavan at Dadar. As the news spread about the incident groups gathered near the Sena Bhavan and started pelting stones at each other. In this incident a policeman was injured and many supporters of both parties were injured. To restore order the police fired tear gas shells at the mob. Decorum was eventually restored following police action and the appearance of Uddhav Thackeray and his cousin Raj Thackeray at the venue. Uddhav appealed to Sena workers to go back home. He said: "The police will take necessary action. This is happening because many people are joining us from MNS. The defections have started and that is why they are resorting to such actions". The division chief of the Shiv Sena Milind Vaidya said that they had lodged a complaint with the local police against an MNS worker who was involved in the incident. MNS general secretary Pravin Darekar, however, pinned the cause down to local elections in the SIES college. He alleges that the Sena is concerned about losing their hold over the colleges and that is why they are trying to color the issue, adding that the Sena's allegations had no merit. Raj Thackeray asserts that MNS could not have vandalized the pictures, seeing as how he and his members revere Bal Thackeray. A Parliamentary committee was set up to examine the breach of privileges notices from some MPs for remarks made by Bal Thackeray against Uttar Bharatiyas (North-Indians). Reacting to this, MNS chief Raj Thackeray had said he would not allow any politician from UP and Bihar to enter Mumbai if the parliamentary panel insisted on summoning Bal.

Bal countered this by terming his nephew Raj a backstabber and reacted to the MNS chief with a "big no thank you."

Shiv Sena (SS) and MNS workers also clashed at Anand Nagar in Oshiwara over the issuance of Navratri posters during the holiday season. SS corporator Rajul Patel said "The MNS activists had put up huge hoardings and were demanding money from people to remove them. People complained to us and we objected. This led to a scuffle." MNS Vibhag Pramukh (Division Leader) Manish Dhuri retorted that "the Sainiks are jealous of our popularity. On Sunday afternoon, a mob of Shiv Sainiks came to the area and started pulling down posters that were put up by us. We objected to this. Unfortunately, one MNS activist sustained severe injuries."

=== Denunciation of MLA Abu Azmi ===
On 9 November 2009 Abu Azmi of the Samajwadi Party was denounced and prevented by MLA of the MNS from taking his oath in Hindi and not in state official language Marathi. As a result of this incident, the speaker of the Maharashtra Legislative Assembly suspended the 4 MNS MLAs involved in the skirmish for a period of four years. They were also barred from entering Mumbai and Nagpur whenever the assembly met in the two cities. The MLAs suspended were Ram Kadam, Ramesh Wanjale, Shishir Shinde and Vasant Gite. The suspension was later revoked in July 2010. Incidents were reported in neighbouring state of Gujarat too.

== Growth in potency ==
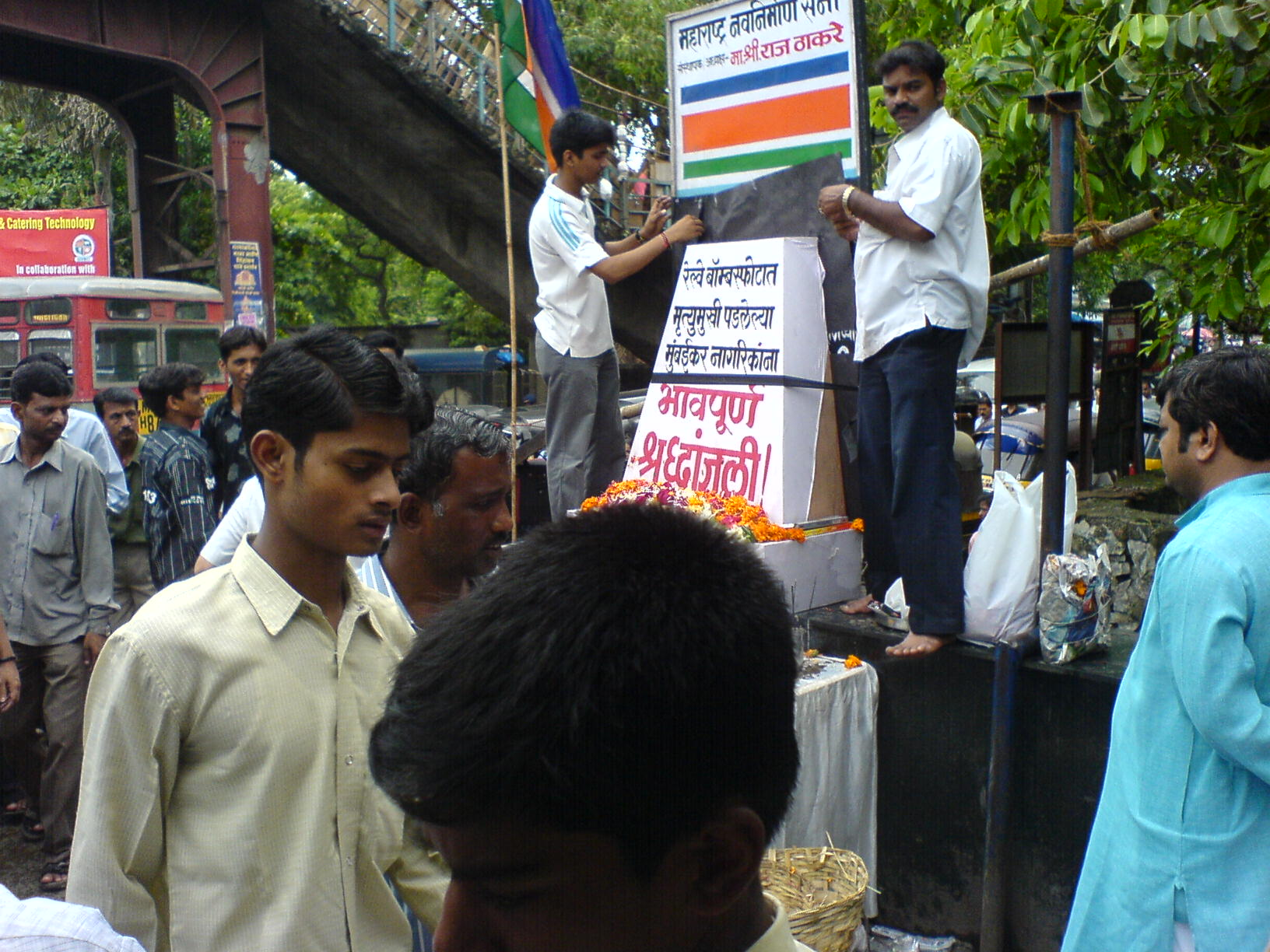
A memorial erected by the Maharashtra Navnirman Sena outside Borivali station aftermath the 11 July 2006 Mumbai train bombings

In October 2008, Jet Airways laid off almost 1,000 employees. In the frenzy for reinstatement that followed numerous political parties took the stand for the probationers’ cause. First the MNS and the SS came in, then the established national parties, the Congress and the BJP. Even the CPI M, rallied in support of the laid off Kolkata employees.

One day after the lay off, the retrenched former staff flocked to the MNS office, even though the SS labour arm, the Bharatiya Kamgar Sena generally rules the aviation unions. The MNS then led more than 300 former employees to Jet's office in Marol. MNS general secretary Nitin Sardesai said, "We met Jet officials today while a lot of (cabin) crew and MNS workers were protesting outside. While we were talking, Jet chairman Naresh Goyal telephoned Raj Thackeray... He requested us to end the protest and offered to meet Raj in a couple of days. We had a one-point agenda that those laid off should be taken back."

In two days the MNS march and support got the staff re-hired. The media widely appeared to pronounce Raj as having won the game of one upmanship with the SS, whose mantle of aggressive street politics was seen as having been usurped. This was a big boost for the MNS' newly formed trade union, the Maharashtra Navnirman Kamgar Sena, which has been trying to cut into the SS' influence in the aviation, hotel and entertainment sectors.

== Electoral history ==
=== Loksabha Elections Results in Maharashtra ===
Maharashtra Navnirman Sena results in the Maharashtra Loksabha Elections
Election Year	Overall votes	% of overall votes	Total seats	seats won/ seats contensted	Change in seats	Outcome
2009	1,503,863	4.1%	48	0 / 11	New	-
2014	11,80,196	2.5%	48	0 / 10	Steady	-
2019 & 2024	Did not contest					

=== Maharashtra Assembly Elections Results ===
Maharashtra Navnirman Sena results in the Maharashtra Assembly Elections
Election Year	Overall votes	% of overall votes	Total seats	seats won/ seats contensted	Change in seats	Outcome
2009	2,585,597	5.71%	288	13 / 143	New	Opposition
2014	1,665,033	3.15%	288	1 / 219	▼12	Opposition
2019	1,642,135	2.25%	288	1 / 101	Steady	Opposition
2024	1,002,557	1.55%	288	0 / 135	▼1	—N/a

=== Municipal Corporation ===
Performance in the 2012 Maharashtra municipal elections.

Municipal Corporation	2012 Results	2017 Results
Brihanmumbai Municipal Corporation	27 (227)	07 (227)
Thane Municipal Corporation	7 / 130	0 / 130
Kalyan-Dombivali Municipal Corporation	26 (107) 2010	10 (107) 2015
Ulhasnagar Municipal Corporation	1 / 78	2 / 78
Mira-Bhayander Municipal Corporation	1 / 94	0 / 95
Vasai-Virar Municipal Corporation	1 (89) 2010	0 (115) 2015
Pune Municipal Corporation	29 / 152	2 / 162
Pimpri-Chinchwad Municipal Corporation	4 / 128	1 / 128
Nashik Municipal Corporation	40 (122)	5 / 122
Akola Municipal Corporation	1 / 73	0 (73)
Amravati Municipal Corporation	1 (87)	
Nagpur Municipal Corporation	2 (145)	
Malegaon Municipal Corporation	2 (31)	
Jalgaon Municipal Corporation	12 (75)	
Palghar Municipal Corporation	0 (12)	
Ahmednagar Municipal Corporation	4 (68)	
Chandrapur Municipal Corporation	1 (66)	
Sangli-Miraj & Kupwad Municipal Corporation	2 (78)	
Wani Municipal Council	8 (16)	
Khed Municipal Council	9 (16)	
Source: MahaSEC

MNS won 13 assembly seats (out of 288) in the 2009 assembly elections Maharashtra. These include 6 in Mumbai, 2 in Thane, 3 in Nashik,1 in Pune and 1 in Kannad (Aurangabad) and remain at 2nd spot at more than 24 places. This result (4.5% seats) makes MNS, fourth in largest party in Maharashtra assembly after Congress-NCP (144 seats), BJP-Shiv-Sena (90 seats), Third Front (14 seats).

In the 2014 Assembly elections, the MNS was trounced. It was only able to win 1 seat across the state. It lost all 10 seats held by it. It also lost on all 6 seats held by it in Mumbai, including Mahim, a Shiv Sena stronghold, which it had previously won from the Sena. Its candidates forfeited their deposits on a record 203 seats out of 218 seats on which it fielded candidates, out of the 288 seats in the state.

In the Bruhanmumbai Municipal Corporation (BMC) elections held in 2017, the tally of MNS was reduced to 7 seats. In October 2017, 6 councillors defected to Shiv Sena, thus taking its representation down to 1 seat.

== Political criticism ==
Following an attack on North Indians who had turned up to the RRB (Railway Recruitment Board) railway exam in Mumbai, numerous politicians, mainly from the then ruling UPA central government, harshly criticised Raj Thackeray and the MNS.

Three UPA ministers demanded tough action, including a call for a ban against the party. Railway Minister Lalu Prasad Yadav demanded a ban on the MNS and saying its chief was a "mental case," Steel Minister Ram Vilas Paswan added that he would raise the issue in the next cabinet meeting and wondered why no action was being, or had been, taken against the MNS despite a repetition of such violent incidents. He said: "I strongly condemn the incident. There should be strong action against that party... MNS should be banned. [The] Thackeray family has become a chronic problem for Maharashtra and Raj Thackeray, in particular, has become a mental case." The Minister for Food Processing Industries, as well as a Congress leader, Subodh Kant Sahay demanded the Congress-NCP coalition government in Maharashtra treat those responsible for the attacks as criminals. He said, "I have spoken to Maharashtra Chief Minister Vilasrao Deshmukh and asked him on the goondaism that is going on in the state." As far the government's action till date is concerned, it has been soft on them. It should take action as too much has already happened there." They are not workers. They are looters. Organisations like MNS, Bajrang Dal, VHP and RSS should be banned."

On the first working day following the incident, uproarious scenes were seen in the national parliament. Numerous members of Parliament condemned the attacks. They also indirectly criticised railway minister Lalu Prasad Yadav while noting that even in their regions, the maximum recruitments being made were those of people from Bihar and not from the state where the recruitment drives were held, adding some credence to the MNS' drive. Speaking first on the issue, RJD leader Devendra Prasad Yadav demanded that the Centre take action in the state under Article 355. He noted that despite the attacks, the Maharashtra chief minister has maintained a silence on the issue, adding that such actions threaten the unity and integrity of the country. Other MP's also demanded the invocation of Article 355 in the light of the attacks. Shahnawaz Hussain of the BJP made such demands in asking if people from Bihar and Uttar Pradesh needed a permit to travel to other parts of the country. The CPI M's Mohammed Salim said that such incidents threaten the country's integrity and send a wrong signal to the rest of the country. Anant Geete of the Shiv Sena, however, tried to give the other side of the story by noting the 4.2 million educated and unemployed youth in Maharashtra. The CPI (M) strongly condemned the attack, terming them a "blatant" assault on the Constitution and demanded the immediate arrest of party chief Raj Thackeray, adding that any leniency shown to "divisive forces" will have far-reaching consequences. The CPI(M) Politburo said the attack on the Constitution was a poor showing on the Maharashtra government which is duty bound to protect and take stringent action against the perpetrators of such crimes. "That it has failed to do so and in fact showing leniency to the leader of the outfit shows the utter bankruptcy of the politics of Congress and its coalition partner." The CPI also said such attacks should not be tolerated and Thackeray and his supporters must be "immediately arrested and prosecuted". Maharashtra Chief Minister Vilasrao Deshmukh said his government is responsible for failure in preventing attacks and ordered a probe into the incident, which will also inquire into why the job advertisements where not given in Marathi newspapers. He said: "What has happened is not good. Such incidents take place because of loopholes in the law. One can't hold only the Home Ministry responsible for it, it is (entire) Government's responsibility. Such incidents are affecting the image of the state and I have instructed the DGP to take stern action." On Raj Thackeray's accusation that job advertisements were not published in local newspapers to keep out Maharashtrian candidates, he said, "An inquiry would also be conducted about why advertisements about the examination were not given in Marathi newspapers and the number of Marathi candidates invited for the exam." He also assured that such incidents of vandalism would not take place in future.

In January 2009, artist Pranava Prakash exhibited his painting series "Chal Hat Be Bihari" in Delhi. It showed in pop style the 2008 attacks on North Indians in Maharashtra in the context of xenophobia.

== Violence and controversies ==
In 2008, MNS created panic among several shop owners through diktat on Marathi signboards.

In December 2012, MNS corporator Nitin Nikam repeatedly slapped a 65-year-old contractor over alleged delay in repairing pipeline causing water shortage.

In March 2013, 5 MNS and Shiv Sena MLAs assaulted Assistant Police Inspector Sachin Suryavanshi in the state assembly.

In January 2014, a mob constituting MNS workers attacked toll booths in eight cities across Maharashtra, and demanding closing of toll booths where the construction cost is below 2 crores.

On 10 April 2015, in a case of moral policing, MNS workers protested against fashion show led by Kareena Kapoor. Following the intervention of law enforcement, the protesting workers fled the scene.

In 2017, MNS workers forcibly removed the signboards of several Gujarati shops claiming they were Belittling Marathi Language.

In May 2018, three trans-women were attacked brutally by more than 20 MNS workers. The trans-women sustained severe injuries.

In June 2018, Kishor Shinde, a former corporator, slapped a multiplex manager repeatedly over high food prices and ban of food items in multiplex theaters .

In September 2018, a mob of MNS workers assaulted a man because of his Facebook post criticising a cartoon drawn by Raj Thackeray. The workers made the man delete his comments, and forced him to apologize. MNS leader Avinash Jadhav threatened the public with similar consequences, "if such things happened again."

In January 2020 on the birth anniversary of Bal Thackeray, his nephew Raj Thackeray changed his party flag colour to Bhagwa (Bhagwa Dhwaj) and agenda from Marathi interest to Hindutva or Hindu nationalism giving a speech against Indian Muslims about disturbances caused by their prayers. He supported National Register of Citizens by saying that "only Indians can live in my country and other countries people can't live in India without passport and VISA so what's wrong in this act?". He also stated that Bangladeshis and Pakistanis should go back to their respective countries or they'll be thrown back forcefully.

In 2022, MNS leader was arrested in Mumbai following allegations of rape made by a female party worker. The complainant alleged that the leader assaulted her after promising a ticket for the upcoming Brihanmumbai Municipal Corporation (BMC) elections and a party post.

in September 2024, film producer Ameya Khopkar threatened violence against Pakistani actors for The Legend of Maula Jatt who set to release on October 2, 2024,

In July 2025, MNS workers were involved in an incident in Mira Road, where a shopkeeper was allegedly assaulted after he refused to speak in Marathi and mentioned that “all languages are spoken in Maharashtra, not just marathi”. A video circulated widely on social media, showing MNS workers repeatedly slapping the shopkeeper while demanding he speak in Marathi.

== Petition filed against Raj Thackeray ==
On April 7, 2025, a petition was filed in the Supreme Court of India accusing MNS president Raj Thackeray of delivering hate speech and inciting violence against the North Indian community. The petition, filed by Sunil Shukla, national president of the Uttar Bhartiya Vikas Sena, and represented by advocate Sriram Parakkat, alleged state inaction against MNS members for harassment and violence. The plea cited Thackeray’s March 30 speech during a Gudi Padwa rally, which allegedly provoked attacks on Hindi-speaking individuals in Mumbai. It also referenced prior threats, including a tweet inciting murder and over 100 anonymous threatening phone calls.

== See also ==
- 2008 All-India Railway Recruitment Board examination attack
- List of political parties in India
