= Bal Thackeray =

Indian cartoonist and politician (1926-2012)

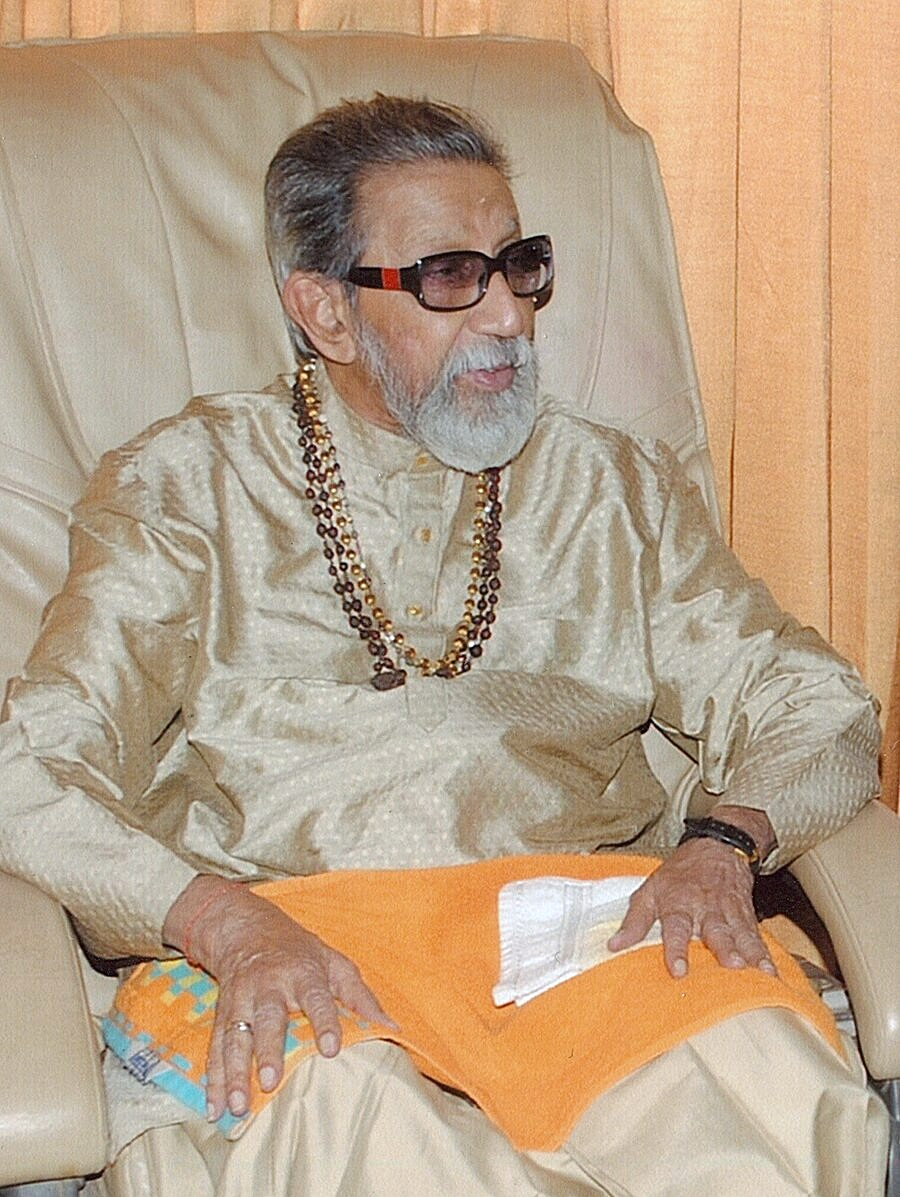
- Thackeray in 2012

Leader (Paksha Pramukh) of Shiv Sena
- In office 19 June 1966 – 17 November 2012
- Preceded by: position created
- Succeeded by: Uddhav Thackeray

Editor-in-chief of Saamana
- In office 23 January 1988 – 20 June 2006
- Preceded by: office established
- Succeeded by: Uddhav Thackeray

Co-founder and Editor-in-chief of Marmik
- In office 13 August 1960 – 17 November 2012
- Preceded by: office established
- Succeeded by: Uddhav Thackeray

Personal details
- Born: Bal Keshav Thackeray; 23 January 1926 Poona, Bombay Presidency, British Raj
- Died: 17 November 2012 (aged 86) Mumbai, Maharashtra, India
- Party: Shiv Sena
- Other political affiliations: National Democratic Alliance (from 1998)
- Spouse: Sarla Vaidya (Note: aka Meena Thackeray) (m. 1948; died 1995)
- Children: 3, including Uddhav Thackeray
- Parents: Keshav Sitaram Thackeray (father); Ramabai Thackeray (mother)
- Relatives: Aaditya Thackeray (grandson); Raj Thackeray (nephew); Thackeray family
- Occupation: Politician; cartoonist
- Known for: Marathi regionalism Hindutva
- Nicknames: Balasaheb; Hindu Hriday Samrat

Bal Keshav Thackeray (Marathi pronunciation: [baːɭ̆ keːʃəʋ ʈʰaːk(ə)ɾeː]; 23 January 1926 – 17 November 2012), also known as Balasaheb Thackeray, was an Indian cartoonist and politician who founded the original Shiv Sena, a right-wing Marathi regionalist and a Hindu nationalist party, active mainly in the state of Maharashtra.

Thackeray began his professional career as a cartoonist with the English-language daily, The Free Press Journal in Bombay, but he left the paper in 1960 to form his own political weekly, Marmik. His political philosophy was largely shaped by his father Keshav Sitaram Thackeray, a leading figure in the Sanyukta Maharashtra (United Maharashtra) movement, which advocated for the creation of a separate linguistic state for Marathi speakers. Through Mārmik, Bal Thackeray campaigned against the growing influence of non-Marathis in Mumbai. He had a large political influence in the state, especially in Mumbai.

In the late 1960s and early 1970s, Thackeray built the Shiv Sena with help of Madhav Mehere, the Chief Attorney for Trade Union of India, Babasaheb Purandare, a historian for Govt of Maharashtra and Madhav Deshpande, the Head Accountant for Shiv Sena. These three individuals, to a large extent, were responsible for the success of Shiv Sena and stability of politics in Mumbai till 2000 to ensure its growth into an economic power center. Thackeray was also the founder of the Marathi-language newspaper Saamana. After the riots of 1992–93, he and his party took a Hindutva ideological stance. In 1999, Thackeray was banned from voting and contesting in any election for six years on the recommendations of the Election Commission for indulging in seeking votes in the name of religion. Thackeray was arrested multiple times and spent a brief stint in prison, but he never faced any major legal repercussions. Upon his death, he was accorded a state funeral, at which many mourners were present. Thackeray did not hold any official positions, and he was never formally elected as the leader of his party.

== Early life and family ==
Bal Thackeray was born on 23 January 1926 in Pune, the son of Prabodhankar Thackeray and his wife Ramabai Thackeray. The family belongs to the Chandraseniya Kayastha Prabhu, a community with ethnic roots in North India. community. His father Keshav was an admirer of India-born British writer William Makepeace Thackeray, and changed his own surname from Panvelkar to "Thackeray" an Anglicised version of their ancestral surname "Thakare".

Thackeray's father, Keshav was a professional journalist and cartoonist by trade; he was also a social activist and a writer who was involved in a Samyukta Maharashtra Samiti, which advocated the creation of a separate linguistic state for Marathi speakers. He also started a magazine named Prabodhan, where he promoted Hindu philosophies and nationalistic ideals to revive Hindutva in society. This proved to be highly influential in shaping Bal Thackeray's political views.

Thackeray was the eldest of eight siblings, with brothers Shrikant Thackeray (father of Raj Thackeray) and Ramesh Thackeray, and five sisters (Sanjeevani Karandikar, Prabhavati (Pama) Tipnis, Malati (Sudha) Sule, Sarla Gadkari and Susheela Gupte).

Raj in 2006 broke away from Shiv Sena to form his own political party called the Maharashtra Navnirman Sena. Despite Raj's breakaway from the main party, he continues to maintain that Thackeray was his ideologue and relations between them improved during Thackeray's final years.

== Cartoonist career ==
Thackeray began his career as a cartoonist in the Free Press Journal in Mumbai. His cartoons were also published in the Sunday edition of The Times of India. After Thackeray's differences with the Free Press Journal, he and four or five people, including politician George Fernandes, left the paper and started their own daily, News Day. The paper survived for one or two months. In 1960, he launched the cartoon weekly Marmik with his brother Srikant. It focused on issues of common "Marathi Manoos" (Marathi, or Marathi-speaking, people) including unemployment, immigration and the retrenchment of Marathi workers. Its office in Ranade Road became the rallying point for Marathi youth. Thackeray later stated that it was "not just a cartoon weekly but also the prime reason for the birth and growth of the Sena". It was the issue of Marmik on 5 June 1966 which first announced the launch of membership for the Shiv Sena.

Thackeray drew cartoons for the Free Press Journal, the Times of India and Marmik besides contributing to Saamna till 2012. He cited the New Zealander cartoonist David Low as his inspiration.

== Politics ==
=== 1966–1998 ===
The success of Marmik prompted Thackeray to form the Shiv Sena on 19 June 1966. The name Shiv Sena (Shivaji's Army) is a reference to the 17th century Maratha Emperor Shivaji. Initially, Thackeray said it was not a political party but an army of Shivaji Maharaj, inclined to fight for the Marathi maanus (person). It demanded that native speakers of the state's local language Marathi (the "sons of the soil" movement) be given preferential treatment in private and public sector jobs. The early objective of the Shiv Sena was to ensure their job security competing against South Indians and Gujaratis. In its 1966 party manifesto, Thackeray primarily blamed south Indians. In Marmik, Thackeray published a list of corporate officials from a local directory, many being south Indians, citing it as proof that Maharashtrians were being discriminated against.

His party grew in the next ten years. Senior leaders such as Babasaheb Purandare, chief attorney for Trade Union of Maharashtra Madhav Mehere joined the party and chartered accountant Madhav Gajanan Deshpande backed various aspects of the party operations. In 1969, Thackeray and Manohar Joshi were jailed after participating in a protest demanding the merger of Karwar, Belgaum and Nipani regions in Maharashtra. During the 1970s, it did not succeed in the local elections and it was active mainly in Mumbai, compared to the rest of the state. The party set up local branch offices and settled disputes, complaints against the government. It later started violent tactics with attacks against rival parties, migrants and the media; the party agitated by destroying public and private property. Thackeray publicly supported Indira Gandhi during the 1975 Emergency; Thackeray supported the Congress party numerous times.

Dr. Hemchandra Gupte, Mayor of Mumbai and the former family physician and confidant of Thackeray, left Shiv Sena in 1976 citing the emphasis given to money, violence committed by the Shiv Sena members, and Thackeray's support for Indira Gandhi and the 1975 emergency.

Politically, the Shiv Sena was anti-communist, and wrested control of trade unions in Mumbai from the Communist Party of India (CPI). Local unemployed youth from the declining textile industry joined the party and it further expanded because of Maharashtrians from the Konkan region. By the 1980s, it became a threat to the ruling Congress party which had initially encouraged it because of it rivalling the CPI. In 1989, the Sena's newspaper Saamna was launched by Thackeray. Because of Thackeray being against the Mandal Commission report, his close aide Chhagan Bhujbal left the party in 1991. Following the 1992 Bombay riots, Thackeray took stances viewed as anti-Muslim and based on Hindutva. Shiv Sena later allied itself with the Bharatiya Janata Party (BJP). The BJP-Shiv Sena alliance won the 1995 Maharashtra State Assembly elections and were in power from 1995 to 1999. Thackeray declared himself to be the "remote control" chief minister.

Thackeray and the Chief Minister Manohar Joshi were explicitly named for inciting the Shivsainiks for violence against Muslims during the 1992–1993 riots in an inquiry ordered by the government of India, the Srikrishna Commission Report.

Thackeray had influence in the film industry. His party workers agitated against films he found controversial and would disrupt film screenings, causing losses. Bombay, a 1995 film on the riots, was opposed by them.

=== 1999–2012 ===
On 28 July 1999, Thackeray was banned from voting and contesting in any election for six years from 11 December 1999 till 10 December 2005 on the recommendations of the Election Commission for indulging in corrupt practice by seeking votes in the name of religion. In 2000, he was arrested for his role in the riots but was released because the statute of limitations expired. In 2002, Thackeray issued a call to form Hindu suicide bomber squads to take on the menace of terrorism. In response, the Maharashtra government registered a case against him for inciting enmity between different groups. At least two organisations founded and managed by retired Indian Army officers, Lt Col Jayant Rao Chitale and Lt Gen. P.N. Hoon (former commander-in-chief of the Western Command), responded to the call with such statements as not allowing Pakistanis to work in India due to accusations against Pakistan for supporting attacks in India by militants. After the six-year voting ban on Thackeray was lifted in 2005, he voted for the first time in the 2007 BMC elections. Eight or nine cases against Thackeray and Saamna for inflammatory writings were not investigated by the government.

Thackeray said that the Shiv Sena had helped the Marathi people in Mumbai, especially in the public sector. Thackeray believed that Hindus must be organised to struggle against those who oppose their identity and religion. Opposition leftist parties alleged that the Shiv Sena has done little to solve the problem of unemployment facing a large proportion of Maharashtrian youth during its tenure, in contradiction to its ideological foundation of 'sons of the soil.'

In November 2005 Thackeray's nephew Raj Thackeray broke away from Shiv Sena and form the Maharashtra Navnirman Sena (MNS) on 9 March 2006 during Thackeray's retirement and appointment of his son, Uddhav rather than Raj as the leader of Shiv Sena. Narayan Rane also quit around 3 July 2005 at that time.

The Sena acted as a "moral police" and opposed Valentine's Day celebrations. On 14 February 2006, Thackeray condemned and apologised for the violent attacks by its Shiv Sainiks on a private celebration in Mumbai. "It is said that women were beaten up in the Nallasopara incident. If that really happened, then it is a symbol of cowardice. I have always instructed Shiv Sainiks that in any situation women should not be humiliated and harassed." Thackeray and the Shiv Sena remained opposed to it, although they indicated support for an Indian alternative.

In 2007, he was briefly arrested and let out on bail after referring to Muslims as 'Green Poison' during a Shiv Sena rally.

On 27 March 2008, in protest to Thackeray's editorial, leaders of Shiv Sena in Delhi resigned, citing its outrageous conduct towards non-Marathis in Maharashtra and announced that they would form a separate party. Addressing a press conference, Shiv Sena's North India chief Jai Bhagwan Goyal said the decision to leave the party was taken because of the partial attitude of the party high command towards Maharashtrians. Goyal further said that Shiv Sena is no different from Khalistan and Jammu and Kashmir militant groups which are trying to create a rift between people along regional lines. The main aim of these forces is to split our country. Like the Maharashtra Navnirman Sena, the Shiv Sena too has demeaned North Indians and treated them inhumanely.

== Views ==
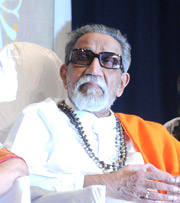
Bal Thackeray at 70th Master Dinanath Mangeshkar Awards in 2012.

Thackeray declared that he was not against every Muslim, but only those who reside in India but do not obey the laws of the land, considering such people to be traitors. The Shiv Sena is viewed by the media as being Islamophobic, though Shiv Sena members officially reject this accusation. When explaining his views on Hindutva, he equated Islam with violence and called on Hindus to fight terrorism and fight Islam. In an interview with Suketu Mehta, he called for the mass expulsion of illegal Bangladeshi Muslim migrants from India and for a visa system to enter Mumbai, the Indian National Congress state government had earlier during the Indira Gandhi declared national emergency considered a similar measure.

He told India Today "[Muslims] are spreading like a cancer and should be operated on like a cancer. The country...should be saved from the Muslims and the police should support them [Hindu Maha Sangh] in their struggle just like the police in Punjab were sympathetic to the Khalistanis." However, in an interview in 1998, he said that his stance had changed on many issues that the Shiv Sena had with Muslims, particularly regarding the Babri Mosque or Ram Janmabhoomi issue: "We must look after the Muslims and treat them as part of us." He also expressed admiration for Muslims in Mumbai in the wake of the 11 July 2006 Mumbai train bombings perpetrated by Islamic fundamentalists. In response to threats made by Abu Azmi, a leader of the Samajwadi Party, that accusations of terrorism directed at Indian Muslims would bring about communal strife, Thackeray said that the unity of Mumbaikars (residents of Mumbai) in the wake of the attacks was a slap to fanatics of Samajwadi Party leader Abu Asim Azmi and that Thackeray salute[s] those Muslims who participated in the two minutes' silence on 18 July to mourn the blast victims. Again in 2008 he wrote: "Islamic terrorism is growing and Hindu terrorism is the only way to counter it. We need suicide bomb squads to protect India and Hindus." He also reiterated a desire for Hindus to unite across linguistic barriers to see a Hindustan for Hindus and to bring Islam in this country down to its knees.

Thackeray was criticised for his praise of Adolf Hitler. He was quoted by Asiaweek as saying: "I am a great admirer of Hitler, and I am not ashamed to say so! I do not say that I agree with all the methods he employed, but he was a wonderful organiser and orator, and I feel that he and I have several things in common...What India really needs is a dictator who will rule benevolently, but with an iron hand." In a 1993 interview, Thackeray stated, "There is nothing wrong if Muslims are treated as Jews were in Nazi Germany." In another 1992 interview, Thackeray stated, "If you take Mein Kampf and if you remove the word 'Jew' and put in the word 'Muslim', that is what I believe in". Indian Express published an interview on 29 January 2007: "Hitler did very cruel and ugly things. But he was an artist, I love him [for that]. He had the power to carry the whole nation, the mob with him. You have to think what magic he had. He was a miracle...The killing of Jews was wrong. But the good part about Hitler was that he was an artist. He was a daredevil. He had good qualities and bad. I may also have good qualities and bad ones." Thackeray also praised Nathuram Godse, the assassin of Mahatma Gandhi.

In 2008, following agitation against Biharis and other north Indians travelling to Maharashtra to take civil service examinations for the Indian Railways due to an overlimit of the quota in their home provinces, Thackeray also said of Bihari MPs that they were spitting in the same plate from which they ate when they criticised Mumbaikars and Maharashtrians. He wrote: "They are trying to add fuel to the fire that has been extinguished, by saying that Mumbaikars have rotten brains." He also criticised Chhath Puja, a holiday celebrated by Biharis and those from eastern Uttar Pradesh, which occurs on six days of the Hindu month of Kartik. He said that it was not a real holiday. This was reportedly a response to MPs from Bihar who had disrupted the proceedings of the Lok Sabha in protest to the attacks on North Indians. Bihar Chief Minister Nitish Kumar, upset with the remarks, called on the prime minister and the central government to intervene in the matter. A Saamna editorial prompted at least 16 MPs from Bihar and Uttar Pradesh, belonging to the Rashtriya Janata Dal, Janata Dal (United), Samajwadi Party and the Indian National Congress, to give notice for breach of privilege proceedings against Thackeray. After the matter was raised in the Lok Sabha, Speaker Somnath Chatterjee said: "If anybody has made any comment on our members' functioning in the conduct of business in the House, not only do we treat that with the contempt that it deserves, but also any action that may be necessary will be taken according to procedure and well established norms. Nobody will be spared.'"

In 2009, he criticised Indian cricketer Sachin Tendulkar, a "Marathi icon", for saying he was an Indian before he was a Maharashtrian.

=== Reservations ===
Thackeray firmly opposed caste based reservation and said, "There are only two castes in the world, the rich are rich and the poor is poor, make the poor rich but don't make the rich poor. Besides these two castes I don't believe in any other casteism."

The Bhartiya Janata Party (BJP) supported caste-based reservations based on the Mandal commission. Thackarey, despite being warned that opposition to the reservations would be politically suicidal for the Shiv Sena party, opposed the BJP over this issue and said he would initiate proceedings against the BJP if the BJP supported caste-based reservations. This also led to his conflict with Chhagan Bhujbal, an OBC, who later left the Shiv Sena.

=== Savarkar ===
Thackeray defended Vinayak Damodar Savarkar against criticism and praised him as a great leader. In 2002, when President A. P. J. Abdul Kalam unveiled a portrait of Savarkar in the presence of Prime Minister Atal Bihari Vajpayee, the Indian National Congress opposed the unveiling of the portrait and boycotted the function. Thackeray criticised the opposition and said, "Who is [Congress president and Leader of the Opposition] Sonia Gandhi to object to the portrait? What relation does she have with the country? How much does she know about the history and culture of India?". Years later, when Congress General Secretary Digvijaya Singh made a statement that Savarkar was allegedly the first one to suggest the two-nation theory that led to the partition, Thackeray rejected the statement of Singh.

=== Kashmiri Pandits ===
In 1990, Bal Thackeray got seats reserved in engineering colleges for the children of Kashmiri Pandits in Maharashtra. At a meeting with them he supported the idea that Kashmiri Pandits could be armed for their self-defence against Jihadis.

== Personal life ==
Thackeray was married to Meena Thackeray (née Sarla Vaidya) on 13 June 1948 and had three sons, oldest son Bindumadhav, middle son Jaidev, and youngest son Uddhav. Meena died in 1995 and Bindumadhav died the following year in a car accident.

== Death ==
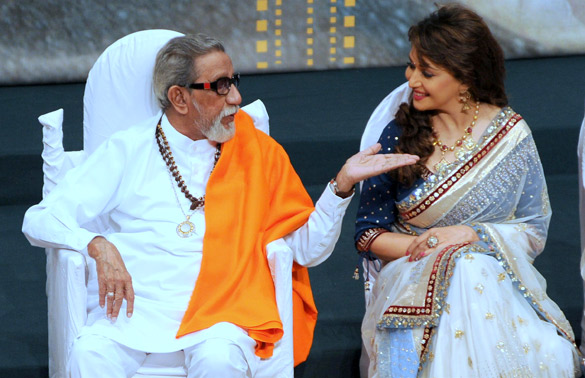
Thackeray with actress Madhuri Dixit in 2012 shortly before his death

Thackeray died on 17 November 2012, of cardiac arrest. Mumbai came to a virtual halt immediately as news about his death broke out, with shops and commercial establishments shutting down. The entire state of Maharashtra was put on high alert. The police appealed for calm and 20,000 Mumbai police officers, 15 units of the State Reserve Police Force and three contingents of the Rapid Action Force were deployed. It was reported that Shiv Sena workers forced shops to close down in some areas. Then Prime Minister Manmohan Singh called for calm in the city and praised Thackeray's "strong leadership", while there were also statements of praise and condolences from other senior politicians such as the then-Gujarat Chief Minister Narendra Modi and the BJP leader and MP (Former Deputy Prime Minister of India), L. K. Advani.

He was accorded a state funeral at Shivaji Park, which generated some controversy and resulted from demands made by Shiv Sena. It was the first public funeral in the city since that of Bal Gangadhar Tilak in 1920. Thackeray's body was moved to the park on 18 November. Many mourners attended his funeral, although there were no official figures. The range reported in media sources varied from around 1 million, to 1.5 million and as many as nearly 2 million. His cremation took place the next day, where his son Uddhav lit the pyre. Among those present at his cremation were senior representatives of the Maharashtra government and the event was broadcast live on national television channels. The Parliament of India opened for its winter session on 21 November 2012. Thackeray was the only non-member to be noted in its traditional list of obituaries. He is one of few people to have been recorded thus without being a member of either the Lok Sabha or the Rajya Sabha. Despite having not held any official position, he was given the 21-gun salute, which was again a rare honour. Both houses of Bihar Assembly also paid tribute. The funeral expenses created further controversies when media reports claimed that the BMC had used taxpayers' money. In response to these reports, the party later sent a cheque of Rs. 500,000 to the corporation.

The Hindu, in an editorial, said regarding the shutdown that "Thackeray’s legion of followers raised him to the status of a demigod who could force an entire State to shut down with the mere threat of violence". Following his death, police arrested a 21-year-old woman who posted a Facebook comment against him, as well as her friend who "liked" the comment. Shiv Sena members also vandalised the clinic owned by the woman's relative.

== Legacy ==
Thackeray was called Hindū Hṛdaya Samrāṭa (lit. 'Emperor of Hindu Hearts') by his supporters. His yearly address at Shivaji Park was popular among his followers. In 2012, he instead gave a video-taped speech and urged his followers "to give the same love and affection to his son and political heir Uddhav as they had given him". Thackeray was known to convert popular sentiment into votes, getting into controversies and making no apologies for it though his son has tried to tone down the party's stance after his death. He was known for his inflammatory writings, was seen as a good orator who used cruel humour to engage his audience. He had a large political influence throughout the state, especially in Mumbai. His party never had any formal internal elections nor was he ever formally elected as its chief at any point. Gyan Prakash said, "Of course, the Samyukta Maharashtra Movement had mobilized Marathi speakers as a political entity, but it was Thackeray who successfully deployed it as an anti-immigrant, populist force." He inspired Baliram Kashyap the leader of Bastar who often regarded as the Thackeray of Bastar.

A memorial for him was proposed at Shivaji Park but legal issues and opposition from local residents continue to delay it.

Thackeray is satirised in Salman Rushdie's 1995 novel The Moor's Last Sigh as 'Raman Fielding'. The book was banned by the Maharashtra state government. Suketu Mehta interviewed Thackeray in his critically acclaimed, Pulitzer-nominated, non-fiction 2004 book Maximum City.

== In popular culture ==
In 2005, Ram Gopal Varma directed the Godfatheresque-Sarkar, a super-hit thriller was inspired by the life of Bal Thackeray and North Indian politics. In this film, Amitabh Bachchan's character was inspired by Thackeray.

The 2011 documentary Jai Bhim Comrade depicted a speech by Thackeray at a public rally, in which he articulated "genocidal sentiments" about Muslims, stating that they were the "species to be exterminated." The documentary followed this by showing several Dalit leaders criticising Thackeray for his beliefs.

Balkadu, a 2015 Marathi film is loosely based on the ideologies of Bal Thackeray and contains voice clippings of Thackeray's political career.

A Bollywood biopic titled Thackeray, starring Nawazuddin Siddiqui and written by Shiv Sena politician Sanjay Raut, was released on 25 January 2019.

Makarand Padhye played Balasaheb Thakeray in the 2022 Marathi film Dharmaveer and its sequel based on the life of Shiv Sena politician Anand Dighe.

Dushyant Wagh played Thackeray in the 2023 Marathi film Maharashtra Shahir based on the life of Krishnarao Sable.

== See also ==
- Thackeray family
  - Prabodhankar Thackeray
  - Uddhav Thackeray
- Shiv Sena (2022–present)
