= Uddhav Thackeray =

19th Chief Minister of Maharashtra from 2019 to 2022 (born 1960)

- Thackeray in 2020.

19th Chief Minister of Maharashtra
- In office 28 November 2019 – 30 June 2022
- Governor: Bhagat Singh Koshyari
- Cabinet: Thackeray ministry
- Deputy: Ajit Pawar
- Preceded by: Devendra Fadnavis
- Succeeded by: Eknath Shinde
Additional Ministries
In office 28 November 2019 – 30 June 2022
Ministry and Departments	General Administration; Law and Judiciary; Information and Public Relations; Information Technology; Forests Department
Preceded by	Devendra Fadnavis

Leader of the House in Maharashtra Legislative Assembly
- In office 28 November 2019 – 29 June 2022
- Speaker of Assembly: Nana Patole; Zirwal Narhari Sitaram
- Deputy: Ajit Pawar
- Preceded by: Devendra Fadnavis
- Succeeded by: Eknath Shinde

Member of Maharashtra Legislative Council
- In office 14 May 2020 – 13 May 2026
- Chair of Council: Ramraje Naik Nimbalkar; Neelam Gorhe; Ram Shinde
- Succeeded by: Ambadas Danve
- Constituency: elected by Legislative Assembly members
Party Political Offices
President of Maha Vikas Aghadi
Incumbent
Assumed office 26 November 2019
Chairperson	Sharad Pawar
Secretary	Balasaheb Thorat
Preceded by	Position established
President of Shiv Sena (UBT)
Incumbent
Assumed office 11 October 2022
Preceded by	Position established
Leader (Paksha Pramukh) of Shiv Sena
In office 23 January 2013 – 10 October 2022
Preceded by	Bal Thackeray (as Pramukh)
Succeeded by	Eknath Shinde (as mukhya neta)
Working President of Shiv Sena
In office 2003–2013
President	Bal Thackeray
Preceded by	Position established
Editor-in-chief of Saamana
In office 20 June 2006 – 28 November 2019
Preceded by	Bal Thackeray
Succeeded by	Rashmi Thackeray

Personal details
- Born: Uddhav Bal Thackeray; 27 July 1960 (age 66) Bombay, Maharashtra, India
- Other political affiliations: Indian National Developmental Inclusive Alliance (since 2023); United Progressive Alliance (2019–2023); Shiv Sena (1978–2022); National Democratic Alliance (1998–2019); Maha Yuti (2014–2019)
- Spouse: Rashmi Thackeray (m. 1989)
- Children: 2, including Aaditya Thackeray
- Parent: Bal Thackeray (father)
- Relatives: See Thackeray Family
- Education: Sir J.J. Institute of Applied Art
- Occupation: Politician

Uddhav Bal Thackeray (Marathi pronunciation: [ud̪ʱːəʋ ʈʰaːkɾeː], born 27 July 1960) is an Indian politician who served as the 19th Chief Minister of Maharashtra from 2019 to 2022 and the Leader of the House, Maharashtra Legislative Assembly from 2019 to 2022. He is a member of Maharashtra Legislative Council since 2020, the president of Maha Vikas Aghadi since 2019 and the president of Shivsena since 2022. He was also the leader (pramukh) of Shivsena from 2013 to 2022, working President from 2003 to 2013 and the editor-in-chief of Saamana from 2006 to 2019. During his tenure from 2019 to 2022, he was ranked as the most popular Chief Minister in a survey conducted in 13 states of India.

== Early life ==
Thackeray was born in a Marathi family on 27 July 1960 as the youngest of politician Bal Thackeray and his wife Meena Thackeray's three sons. He did his schooling from Balmohan Vidyamandir and graduated from Sir J. J. Institute of Applied Art with photography as his main subject.

== Political career ==
In 2002, Thackeray started his political career as campaign in-charge of Shiv Sena in the Brihan Mumbai Municipal Corporation elections. In 2003, he was appointed as working president of Shiv Sena. Thackeray took over as chief editor of Saamana (a daily Marathi-language newspaper published by Shiv Sena) in 2006 and resigned in 2019 before becoming chief minister of Maharashtra.

A split in Shiv Sena happened when his cousin Raj Thackeray left the party in 2006 to form his own party named Maharashtra Navnirman Sena. After the death of his father Bal Thackeray in 2012, he led the party and was elected as Shiv Sena president in 2013, and under his leadership Shiv Sena joined the NDA government in Maharashtra in 2014.

In 2019, Shiv Sena broke away with NDA and joined UPA. It formed a sub alliance called Maha Vikas Aghadi to form the government in Maharashtra with Thackeray leading the ministry.

=== Chief Minister of Maharashtra ===
Though Thackeray never took any constitutional post in his political career initially, however after a brief political crisis, on 28 November 2019 he took the oath as 18th Chief minister of Maharashtra after being elected as the president of the newly formed post-poll coalition Maha Vikas Aghadi.

Thackeray has committed Maharashtra to leading the effort against climate change, as the state considers a radical plan to deregister vehicles that run on diesel or petrol by 2030. He plans for the city of Mumbai to become a climate-resilient metropolis which is carbon-neutral by 2050, which is 20 years before India's target for carbon neutrality.

Following a rebellion within his party and resulting political crisis on 29 June 2022, Thackeray resigned from the post of Chief Minister of Maharashtra ahead of a floor test ordered by governor Bhagat Singh Koshyari. Thackeray challenged the order in the Supreme Court of India citing the pending disqualification motion of the rebel MLAs, but the Supreme Court refused to stay the floor test.

=== Loss of Control over Shiv Sena Party ===
Thackeray took over as the leader of Shiv Sena in 2012 after his father, Bal Thackeray, died. However, in recent years, his leadership of the party has been challenged. After Eknath Shinde established the government in Maharashtra, he began using the Shiv Sena name and symbols without Uddhav Thackeray, leading to a leadership dispute within the party. Despite challenging this in court and before the Election Commission of India, Thackeray's faction was ultimately unsuccessful in its bid to maintain control over the party, as the commission recognised Eknath Shinde's faction as the legitimate Shiv Sena party.

=== Change in bylaws ===
The Election Commission of India mandates that every political party follows a democratic process. In 2018, Thackeray oversaw changes to the Shiv Sena party constitution that were criticised for centralising control of the party and not allowing for free, fair, and transparent elections for party positions. The Election Commission of India deemed these amendments undemocratic, further eroding his control over the party.

=== Eknath Shinde's challenge and takeover ===
More recently, Thackeray faced a significant challenge to his leadership when Eknath Shinde, a key member of the party, called for breaking the Maha Vikas Aghadi alliance and re-establishing an alliance with the Bharatiya Janata Party. Despite gathering support from two-thirds of his party members, Thackeray ignored their requests, leading to a political crisis that resulted in his resignation as Chief Minister of Maharashtra. Through a legal battle, Eknath Shinde claimed that he had the support of the majority of Shiv Sena members, and the Election Commission of India recognised his faction as the legitimate Shiv Sena party, effectively granting him control over the party.

== Personal life ==
Thackeray has always had a keen interest in photography and has exhibited his collection of aerial shots of various forts of Maharashtra at the Jehangir Art Gallery in 2004. He has also taken photographs of wildlife including those of the Kanha, Gir, Ranthambore, Bharatpur national parks. Due to these experiences he named his first photography exhibition in 1999 as "Live and Let Live". He has also published photo-books Maharashtra Desh (2010) and Pahava Vitthal (2011), capturing various aspects of Maharashtra and the warkaris during Pandharpur Wari respectively in the two books.

On 16 July 2012, Thackeray was admitted to Lilavati Hospital after he reported chest pain. He underwent an angioplasty and all the three blockages in his arteries were successfully removed. On 12 November 2021, he underwent a cervical spine surgery at the HN Reliance Hospital.

=== Family ===
Thackeray is married to Rashmi Thackeray and has two sons, Aaditya, who serves as MLA from Worli constituency, and Tejas.

Rashmi Thackeray (née Patankar) is the editor of Saamana and Marmik. She is the daughter of Madhav Patankar, who runs his family business and is also an RSS member. She lived in suburban Dombivli and did her Bachelor of Commerce degree from V G Vaze College in Mulund. She joined the Life Insurance Corporation of India as a contract employee in 1987. She became the friend of Raj Thackeray's sister Jaywanti and came into contact with Thackeray through her. Later, they got married in 1989.

The elder son, Aaditya, is the president of the Yuva Sena. He has served as Cabinet Minister of Tourism and Environment Government of Maharashtra. Tejas, the younger son, is a wildlife conservationist and researcher.

== See also ==
- Uddhav Thackeray ministry
- Political families of India
- Political families of Maharashtra
