= Thackeray family =

Indian political Family

- Place of origin: Maharashtra
- Members: Keshav Sitaram Thackeray Rama Thackeray (wife): Bal Thackeray (son); Uddhav Thackeray (grandson); Rashmi Thackeray (granddaughter-in-law); Aaditya Thackeray (great-grandson); Tejas Thackeray (great-grandson); Bindumadhav Thackeray (grandson); Jaidev Thackeray (grandson); Srikant Thackeray (son); Raj Thackeray (grandson); Sharmila Thackeray (grand daughter-in-law); Amit Thackeray (great-grandson); Urvashi Thackeray (great-granddaughter)

The Thackeray family (Marathi pronunciation: [ʈʰaːkəɾeː]) is one of the most powerful political families in the Indian state of Maharashtra.

Keshav Sitaram Thackeray was one of the prominent leaders of the Samyukta Maharashtra Movement.

== Family tree ==
This is the family tree of the Thackeray family.

Prabodhankar Thackeray	Ramabai Thackeray
Pama	Susheela	Sanjeevani	Balasaheb Thackeray	Minatai Thackeray	Shrikant Thackeray	Kunda Thackeray
Jaiprakash Tipnis	Pankaj Gupte	Shweta Gupte	Bindumadhav	Madhavi	Uddhav	Rashmi	Jaidev	Anuradha	Raj	Sharmila
Leena Tipnis Kulkarni	Payal Gupte	Nihar	Ankita Harshvardhan Patil	Neha	Aaditya	Tejas	Amit	Urvashi

== See also ==
- Nehru–Gandhi family
