= Raj Thackeray =

Indian politician (born 1968)

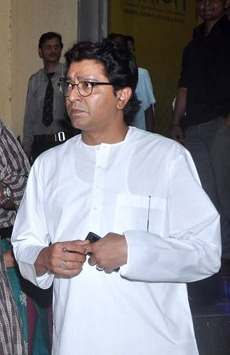
- Thackeray in 2010's

President of Maharashtra Navnirman Sena
- Incumbent
- Assumed office 9 March 2006
- Preceded by: Office established

Personal details
- Born: Swararaj Shrikant Thackeray; 14 June 1968 (age 58) Mumbai, Maharashtra, India
- Party: Maharashtra Navnirman Sena (2006–present)
- Other political affiliations: Shiv Sena (before 2006)
- Spouse: Sharmila Thackeray
- Children: Amit Thackeray; Urvashi Thackeray
- Parent: Kunda Thackeray Shrikant Thackeray
- Relatives: Thackeray family
- Education: Sir J.J. Institute of Applied Art
- Profession: Politician, cartoonist, orator

Raj Shrikant Thackeray (Marathi pronunciation: [ɾaːd͡ʒ ʈʰaːkɾeː], born Swararaj Shrikant Thackeray; 14 June 1968) is an Indian politician and the founder chairman of Maharashtra Navnirman Sena (MNS), a regional political party. He is the nephew of Bal Thackeray.

== Early life ==
Thackeray's given name is a hypocorism of Swararaj. His parents were Shrikant Thackeray (younger brother of Bal Thackeray) and Kunda Thackeray (younger sister of Bal Thackeray's wife Meena Thackeray). As a child he learnt tabla, guitar and violin. Thackeray is a 10th standard graduate and a dropout of Mumbai's Sir J.J. Institute of Applied Art. He finished 10th standard in 1983 and joined Marmik, the weekly magazine of Bal Thackeray, as a cartoonist, in 1985.

== Political career ==
=== Early years in Shiv Sena ===
Thackeray started his political career by launching the student wing of Shiv Sena called Bharatiya Vidyarthi Sena. He came to prominence during the campaign for 1990 Maharashtra assembly elections. During the 1990s, Raj believed himself to be heir of his uncle, Balasaheb. However, Balasaheb showed strong preference for his own son, Uddhav Thackeray.

=== Maharashtra Navnirman Sena ===
Years after being sidelined by Bal Thackeray's other leaders working for him, Raj Thackeray resigned from Shiv Sena on 27 November 2005 and announced his intention to start a new political party. On 9 March 2006 in Mumbai, Thackeray founded Maharashtra Navnirman Sena. After 20 years of his political career as the party supremo of MNS, he allied for the first time, with his cousin Uddhav Thackeray's Shiv Sena (UBT) for the 2026 BrihanMumbai Municipal Corporation Elections.

== Controversies ==
=== 2008 Anti-North Indian campaign ===
In February 2008, Raj Thackeray led a violent movement against migrants from the North Indian states of Uttar Pradesh and Bihar in Maharashtra and more so in its commercial capital, Mumbai. At a rally in Shivaji Park, Raj warned that if the dadagiri (intimidating dominance) of these people (North Indians) in Mumbai and Maharashtra continued, he would be compelled to make them leave the metropolis. Raj was arrested along with a Samajwadi Party leader, Abu Azmi, but was released on paying a penalty of ₹15,000 (US$160).

=== Australian ban ===
His party, along with Shiv Sena banned Australian cricketers participating in IPL 3 from playing in Mumbai as a protest against the attack on Indian students in Australia.

=== Business signboards in Marathi ===
In July 2008, Raj issued a public warning that shops in Mumbai needed to have Marathi signboards in addition to the existing English signboards. He warned that after one month, MNS workers would start blackening non-Marathi signboards. While there had been a law passed for this earlier by Brihanmumbai Municipal Corporation, it had not been enforced. In September 2008, MNS workers attacked shops and blackened signboards, to enforce the demand, after which most shop owners complied and installed Marathi signboards. Six MNS workers were arrested but later released on bail.

=== Jaya Bachchan ===
Jaya Bachchan, actor and MP of Samajwadi Party, during the music launch of the Hindi film Drona, said, "हम यूपी के लोग हैं, इसलिए हिन्दी में बात करेंगे, महाराष्ट्र के लोग मा'फ़ कीजिए।" [ISO: Hama Yūpī Kē Lōga Haiṃ, Isaliē Hindī Mēṃ Bāta Karēngē, Mahārāṣṭra Kē Lōga Mā'af Kījiē.] (We are people of UP (Uttar Pradesh), so we will speak in Hindi. People of Maharashtra, please excuse). Thackeray commented that she had no business alluding to all the people of Maharashtra in that statement. He threatened to ban all Bachchan films unless Jaya apologised in a public forum for hurting Maharashtrians. MNS workers began to attack theatres featuring films affiliated to her. It was only after her husband, Amitabh Bachchan, tendered an apology that the screening resumed. Following Raj's threat, Maharashtra Police acted against Raj, issuing a gag order preventing him from speaking to the media.

=== Jet airways staff reinstatement ===
In October 2008, Jet Airways laid off 800 temporary workers and announced layoffs of an additional 1100 workers. The laid-off workers included Marathi as well as North-Indians. Thackeray was asked to intervene. Following this, Raj Thackeray declared that most of these workers had paid security deposits to the company, and he would meet Jet management to plead their case. Unless Jet Airways cancelled the layoffs, his party would not allow any Jet Airways plane to take off from any airport in Maharashtra. Within 12 hours of Raj Thackeray's declaration, Jet chairman Naresh Goyal reversed the layoffs and reinstated the sacked employees. He said that he did it on his own and that there was no political pressure on him.

=== Wake Up Sid Controversy ===
On 2 October 2009, MNS workers disrupted the screening of the film Wake Up Sid on its release in a few Pune and Mumbai theatres, after Raj objected to references in the movie to "Bombay" rather than "Mumbai". The city of Mumbai was referred to as "Bombay" in many scenes and in some songs (lyrics by Javed Akhtar). The film's producer, Karan Johar, visited Raj's residence to apologise, and agreed to all of Raj's terms, including an apology on each of the 700 frames in the film.

=== Telecom Services in Marathi ===
Telecom companies in Maharashtra had been providing customer service in English & Hindi only. Raj demanded that all telecom companies operating in Maharashtra start providing the service in Marathi also and set a deadline of 27 February 2010, after which his party MNS would launch an agitation. Following this demand, all telecom companies complied, introducing Marathi as an additional option in their customer service.

=== Merger of Belgaum in Maharastra ===
In December 2011, Raj Thackeray meeting a group from MES (Maharashtra Ekikaran Samiti) advised them that they should revisit their stand of merging Belgaum with Maharashtra in the interest of Marathi speaking people of Belgaum. In a major departure from the earlier held stand of traditional right-wing groups of Maharashtra, Raj Thackeray pointed out that a practical approach rather than an emotional one is the need of the hour. However, he advocated that if the Supreme Court of India itself gives a decision in favour of Belgaum's merger, he would welcome it but the local situation in Belgaum should not be vitiated for the sake of it. He asked the MES leaders to first identify the real issue as to whether Marathis in Belgaum are being targeted for espousing the cause of Marathi language or because they were supporting the merger of Belgaum with Maharashtra. Lamenting that strikes and bandhs only add to the misery of the Marathi-speaking community in Belgaum, Thackeray said: "If the Karnataka government is ready to respect the Marathi people, their culture and language, then there is nothing wrong in Belgaum being there." His comments were strongly criticised by his cousin Uddhav as a cruel joke on the Marathi people.

== Views ==
Raj Thackeray and his party, Maharashtra Navnirman Sena, state that Maharashtra State, Marathi language and Marathi people are subverted by the influence of Marathi politicians. He has opposed migration into Maharashtra from Uttar Pradesh and Bihar.

Raj reproached North Indian leaders for politicising Chhath Puja, a festival popular in eastern Uttar Pradesh, Bihar, and Jharkhand calling it a "drama" and a "show of numerical strength". He stated that the Chhath Puja was a political gimmick by some parties to attract the north Indian vote. A petition was filed in the Patna civil court on 8 February against him for his remarks. His statements were criticised from political leaders, especially those from the North Indian states. He accused migrants of swamping Maharashtra, India's most industrialised state, in search of jobs. The MNS chief also accused migrants of disrespecting the local culture. In 2008, expressing his stance on new migrants settling in Mumbai, Raj said, "New immigrants to the city should be denied entry into the city, while those already staying here should show respect to the Marathi 'manoos' and his culture".

Thackeray and his party have been criticised for use of violence during their agitations, especially directed towards immigrants from UP and Bihar. On use of violence, Thackeray says that violence is a part of all agitations in Indian politics, and there are several cases of much more violence carried out by other parties and organisations. According to him, the incidents of violence involving members of his party have been unduly highlighted by North Indian politicians and journalists.

Thackeray had initially praised former Chief Minister of Gujarat and incumbent Prime Minister of India, Narendra Modi for his governance, and the development of Gujarat during his tenure as chief minister. He had also expressed support for Modi for the post of Prime Minister for the 2014 Lok Sabha election. Although later on, he regretted his support for Modi and since then has been a vocal critic of him and the NDA government. For the 2019 elections to the Lok Sabha, Maharashtra Navnirman Sena, did not contest any seats, and instead Thackeray urged the party supporters to vote for the NCP–Congress alliance, with Thackeray campaigning for candidates belonging to these parties. However, during the 2024 elections, Thackeray changed his stance and reaffirmed his support for Narendra Modi and the NDA, after dismal governance of the Maha Vikas Aghadi in Maharashtra, the divisive politics played by INDI Alliance, and citing the NDA's work from on removing article 370, criminalizing triple talaq, construction of Ram Mandir in Ayodhya, and the COVID-19 vaccination in India.

Thackeray-led MNS criticised the centre's move to award the Padma Shri, the fourth highest civilian award in India, to Adnan Sami, claiming that Sami was not an original Indian citizen.

While appearing on primetime TV show Aap Ki Adalat in April 2014, Thackeray targeted several political leaders on various matters. He criticized Ajit Pawar for his comment on urinating into a dam when asked about resolving water crisis, and heavily slammed Samajwadi Party leaders Abu Azmi and Mulayam Singh Yadav for their anti-women views after making insensitive comments about rape.

Thackeray called for a ban on loudspeakers in Masjid.

== Personal life ==
Thackeray is married to Sharmila Wagh, daughter of Marathi cinema photographer, producer-director Mohan Wagh. They got married on 11 December 1990 in Mumbai. They have a son, Amit Thackeray and a daughter, Urvashi Thackeray.

== See also ==
- Zenda, 2010 Marathi-language film
