= Shiv Sena =

Political party in Maharashtra, India

- Founder: Bal Thackeray
- Founded: 19 June 1966
- Dissolved: 10 October 2022
- Succeeded by: Shiv Sena (UBT); Shiv Sena (Shinde)
- Headquarters: Shivsena Bhavan, Dadar, Mumbai, Maharashtra
- Newspaper: Saamana; Marmik
- Student wing: Bharatiya Vidyarthi Sena (BVS)
- Youth wing: Yuva Sena
- Women's wing: Shiv Sena Mahila Aghadi
- Ideology: Conservatism (Indian); Social conservatism Marathi regionalism Marathi nativism Hindutva; Hindu nationalism Ultranationalism; Economic nationalism Right-wing populism
- Political position: Right-wing to far-right
- Colours: Saffron
- ECI status: State Party
- Alliance: National Democratic Alliance (1998–2019); Maha Vikas Aghadi (2019–2022); United Progressive Alliance (2019–2022)

Election symbol

Party flag
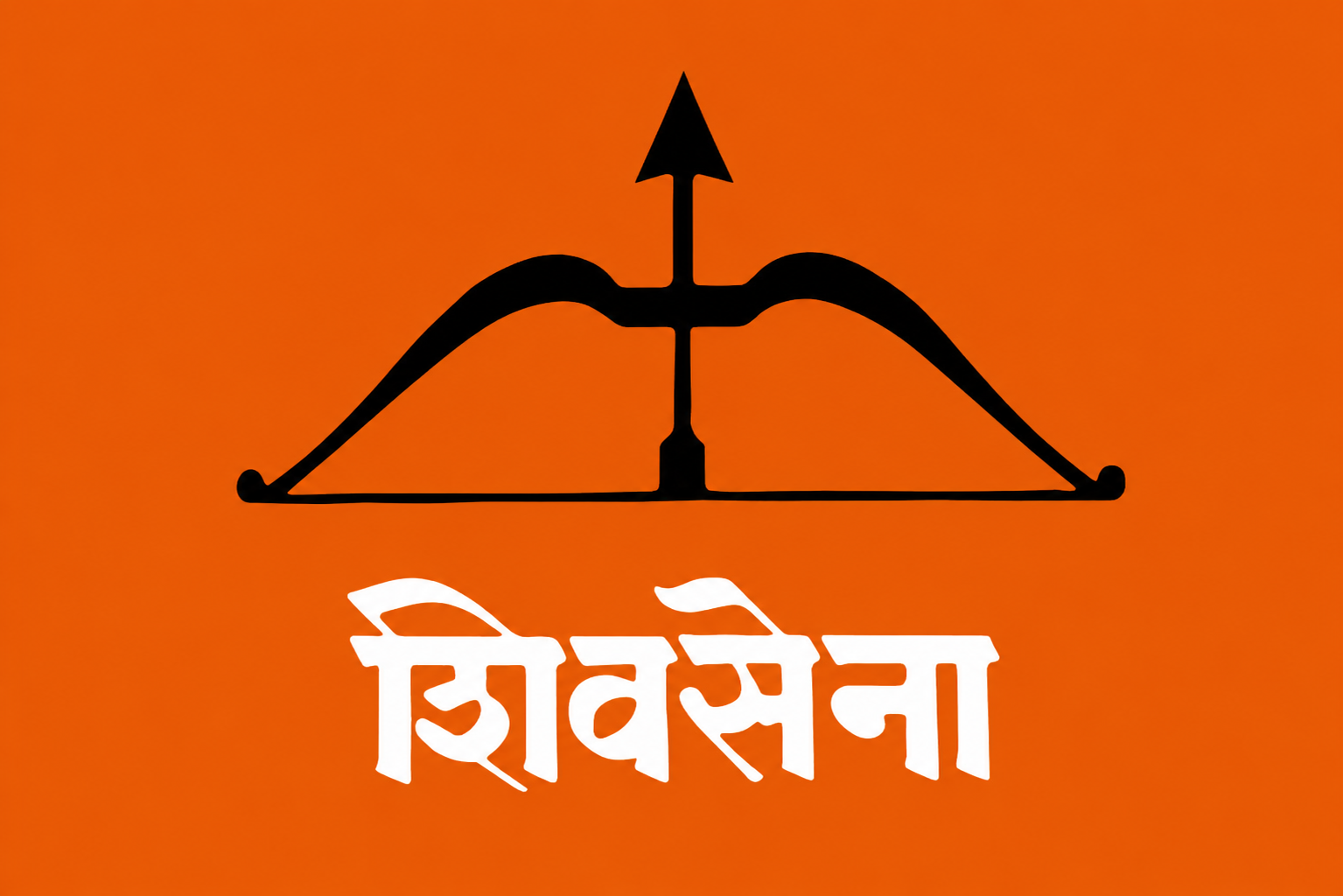

Shiv Sena (1966–2022) (Śiva Sēnā; lit. 'Army of Shivaji'; abbr. SS) was a conservative Marathi regionalist Hindutva-based political party in India founded in 1966 by Bal Thackeray, who was later succeeded by Uddhav Thackeray. The party has split into two parties: the Uddhav Thackeray-led Shiv Sena (Uddhav Balasaheb Thackeray) which has a new symbol of Mashaal (Torch) and Eknath Shinde-led Shiv Sena (Eknath Shinde) which has the original party name and the "bow and arrow" symbol.

Initially apolitical, the organisation was patronised by the then Chief Minister Vasantrao Naik who used it for curbing trade unions and maintain stranglehold of the Congress. The organisation at the same time carried out pro-Marathi nativist movement in Mumbai in which it agitated for preferential treatment for the Marathi people over migrants from other parts of India.

Although Shiv Sena's primary base always remained in Maharashtra, it tried to expand to a pan-Indian base. In the 1970s, it gradually moved from advocating a pro-Marathi ideology to supporting a broader Hindu nationalist agenda, and aligned itself with the Bharatiya Janata Party (BJP). Shiv Sena took part in Mumbai (BMC) municipal elections for its entire existence. In 1989, it entered into an alliance with the BJP for Lok Sabha as well as Maharashtra Legislative Assembly elections. The alliance in the latter was temporarily broken in the 2014 elections due to seat sharing adjustment, although it was quickly reformed. Shiv Sena was one of the founding members of the BJP-led National Democratic Alliance (NDA) in 1998, and it also participated in Vajpayee Government from 1998 to 2004 and the Narendra Modi Government from 2014 to 2019.

After 2019 Maharashtra Legislative Assembly election, the party left the alliance after disagreements with BJP over the CM post. Under Uddhav Thackeray, Shiv Sena formed an alliance with its historic rivals, the Indian National Congress and Nationalist Congress Party Following the 2022 Maharashtra political crisis, the party split.

The party once had a powerful hold over the Hindi film industry. It has been accused of being an "extremist", "chauvinist", or "fascist" party. Shiv Sena has been allegedly involved in the 1970 communal violence in Bhiwandi, the 1984 Bhiwandi riot, and violence in the 1992–1993 Bombay riots.

== History ==
=== Origins ===
After the Independence of India in 1947, regional administrative divisions from the colonial era were gradually changed and states following linguistic borders were created. Within the Bombay Presidency, a massive popular struggle was launched for the creation of a state for the Marathi-speaking people. In 1960, the presidency was divided into two linguistic states: Gujarat and Maharashtra. Moreover, Marathi-speaking areas of the erstwhile Hyderabad state were joined with Maharashtra. Bombay, in many ways the economic capital of India, became the state capital of Maharashtra. On one hand, people belonging to the Gujarati community owned the majority of the industry and trade enterprises in the city. There was a steady flow of South Indian migrants to the city leading to fears that they would take many white-collar jobs.

In 1960, Bal Thackeray, a Mumbai-based cartoonist, began publishing the satirical cartoon weekly Marmik. Through this publication, he started disseminating anti-migrant sentiments. On 19 June 1966, Thackeray founded the Shiv Sena as a political organisation.

The Shiv Sena attracted many unemployed Marathi youth, who were attracted by Thackeray's charged anti-migrant oratory. Shiv Sena cadres became involved in various attacks against the South Indian communities, vandalizing South Indian restaurants and pressuring employers to hire Marathis.

Initially apolitical, the organisation was patronised by the then Chief Minister Vasantrao Naik who used it for curbing trade unions and maintain stranglehold of the Congress. Because of its close association with Vasantrao, the organisation was also referred to as "Vasant Sena".

The Shiv Sena declared support to the Emergency in 1975 and supported the Congress in the 1977 general election. In 1980 Maharashtra Assembly election, the party did not contest from any seat however it campaigned for the Congress.

=== Alliance with the Bharatiya Janata Party ===
The Sena started placing more weight on the Hindutva ideology in the 1970s as the 'sons of the soil' cause was weakening.

In the 1984 general election, Shiv Sena formed its first alliance with the Bharatiya Janata Party (BJP) and Shiv Sena candidates fought on BJP's lotus symbol.

The party began a coalition with the BJP for seats in the Lok Sabha and the Maharashtra Assembly from 1989. The two formed a government in Maharashtra between 1995 and 1999. The Sena was the opposition party in the state along with the BJP from 1999 to 2014. However, the 25 year alliance with the BJP was threatened in 2014 Maharashtra Assembly elections over seat sharing and both contested the election independently. With the BJP becoming the largest party following the 2014 election, Sena declared opposition. However, after negotiations, Sena agreed to join the government in Maharashtra. The Shiv Sena-BJP combine governs the Brihanmumbai Municipal Corporation. Traditionally the main strongholds of Shiv Sena have been Mumbai and the Konkan coastal areas. However, in the 2004 Lok Sabha elections the result was reversed. The Shiv Sena made inroads in the interior parts of the state, while suffering losses in Mumbai.

=== Formation of Maharashtra Navanirman Sena ===
In July 2005, Former Maharashtra Chief Minister and Sena leader Narayan Rane was expelled from the party, which sparked internal conflict in the party. In December the same year Raj Thackeray, Bal Thackeray's nephew, left the party. Raj Thackeray later founded a separate party, Maharashtra Navnirman Sena (MNS).

Although the MNS is a break-away group from the Shiv Sena, the party is still based in Bhumiputra ideology. When unveiling the party in an assembly at Shivaji Park he said, everyone is anxious to see what will happen to Hindutva and, "I shall elaborate on the party's stance on issues like Hindutva, its agenda for development of Maharashtra and the significance of the party flag colours at the 19 March public meeting."

=== Leadership change ===
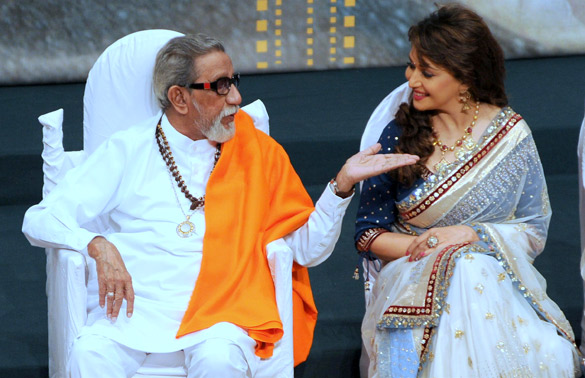
Bal Thackeray, at a gathering

Bal Thackeray's son Uddhav Thackeray became the party's leader in 2004, although Bal Thackeray continued to be an important figurehead. After the death of Bal Thackeray on 17 November 2012, Uddhav became the leader of the party but refused to take the title "Shiv Sena Pramukh" (Eng : Shiv Sena Supremo).

=== Ideology shifts ===
The Shiv Sena party's ideology has undergone changes since its formation. Initially, it started with the ideology of Marathi regionalism under the leadership of Bal Thackeray. However, the party shifted towards ultranationalism and right-wing populism over time, which helped them form an alliance with the Bharatiya Janata Party (BJP). When Uddhav Thackeray became the party leader, he gradually shifted towards composite nationalism and formed an alliance with the Congress and Nationalist Congress Party (NCP). This shift in ideology was a significant departure from Shiv Sena's traditional stance, as the party had been historically opposed to the Congress and NCP for the majority of its existence.

=== 2022 political crisis and split in the party ===
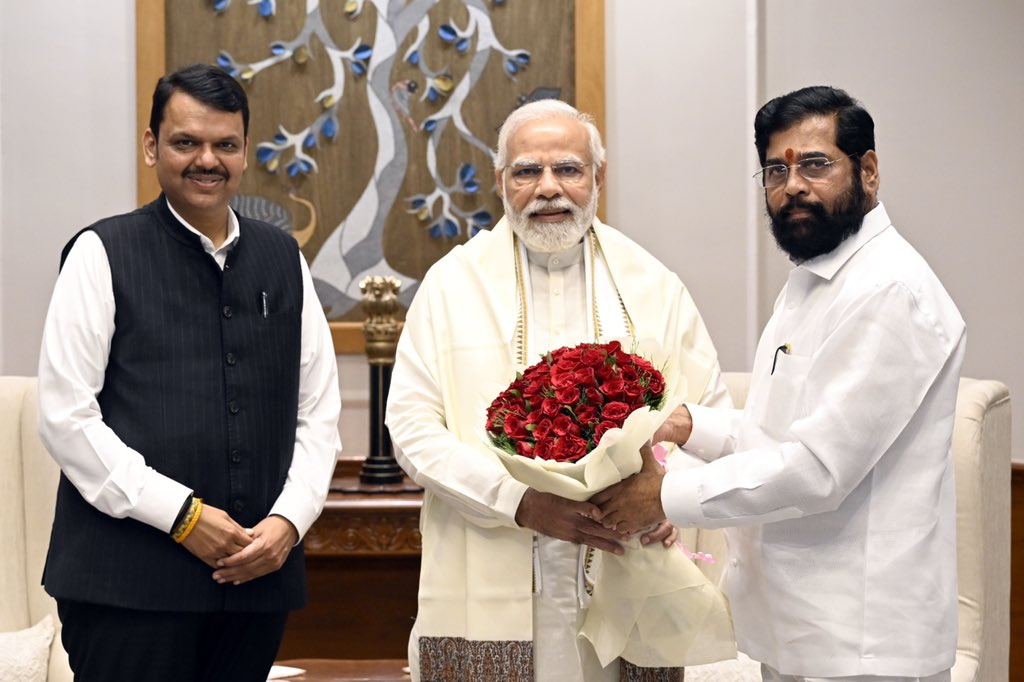
Eknath Shinde with NDA partners

In late June 2022, Eknath Shinde, a senior Shiv Sena leader, and the majority of MLAs from Shiv Sena joined hands with the BJP. Governor Bhagat Singh Koshyari called for a trust vote, an action that would later on be described as a "sad spectacle" by Supreme Court of India, and draw criticism from Political Observers. Uddhav Thackeray resigned from the post as chief minister well as a MLC member ahead of no-confidence motion on 29 June 2022. Shinde subsequently formed a new coalition with the BJP, and was sworn in as the Chief Minister on 30 June 2022. Uddhav Thackeray filed a lawsuit with the Supreme Court of India claiming that Eknath Shinde and his group's actions meant that they were disqualified under the anti-defection law, with Eknath Shinde claiming that he has not defected, but rather represents the true Shiv Sena party. The case is currently being heard by Supreme Court of India. The parties split into two factions: Balasahebanchi Shiv Sena led by Shinde and Shiv Sena (Uddhav Balasaheb Thackeray) led by Thackeray.

Shinde subsequently filed a petition with the Election Commission of India staking his claim to the 'Shiv Sena' name and the Bow and Arrow symbol. The ECI ruled in favour of Shinde's faction based on the strength of its legislative wing, rather than on the organizational wing. Thackeray appealed against the decision, and the case is currently pending in the Supreme Court.

== Party structure and caste composition ==
=== Structure ===
The Shiv Sena (SS) was led by a president, traditionally referred to as the "Shiv Sena Pramukh", (transl. Chief) which translates to "Shiv Sena Chief" in English. Bal Thackeray served as the first Shiv Sena Pramukh and took all major decisions while the activists and members of the Shiv Sena, known as Shiv Sainiks, (transl. Soldiers) carried out most of the party's grassroots work. During his last days, the day-to-day activities of the party were handled by his youngest son Uddhav Thackeray, who succeeded him as party leader after his death in 2012.

Shiv Sena formed a network of grassroots organizations, known as "Shiv Sena Shakhas" (transl. Branch). The Shakhas serve as the primary unit of the party, with each Shakha consisting of 25-50 members. The Shakhas were responsible for carrying out the party's activities at the grassroots level, such as mobilizing voters during elections, organizing protests and rallies, and engaging in community service activities.

In addition to the Shakhas, the party has various other organizational structures, including the Yuva Sena, (transl. Youth Army) party's youth wing, and the Mahila Aghadi, the party's women's wing. The Shiv Sena is also affiliated with the Sthaniya Lokadhikar Samiti, which advocates for the preservation of employment rights for Maharashtrians in Maharashtra.

Prior to the rebellion by its prominent leader Eknath Shinde in 2022, the party was in hand of Thackeray family, thus most of the important positions was hold by Bal Thackeray's son and grandson that is Uddhav and Aditya Thackeray respectively. Opposition parties frequently alleged Shiva Sena as a dynastic political party. Bal Thackeray never remained on any elected political position but he never vacated the position of Shiva Sena supremo and ruled as a Godfather or king maker.

For the first time ever, Thackeray family directly participated in election when Aditya contested for a seat of MLA in 2019. Later, his father debuted in direct politics and became chief minister of the state. Aditya was the tourism minister his father's cabinet.

=== Caste composition ===
People of various Maharashtrian castes worked together in the Sena. The party's leaders mostly came from the "high castes" that is Brahmins, Chandraseniya Kayastha Prabhu and Pathare Prabhus - Thackerey, Manohar Joshi, Sudhir Joshi, Balwant Mantri, Hemchandra Gupte, Shyam Deshmukh, Madhav Deshpande, Datta Pradhan, Vijay Parvatkar, Madhukar Sarpotdar and Pramod Navalkar. One of the above-mentioned leaders, Hemchandra Gupte, who was Mayor of Bombay in the early 70s and was the former family physician and confidant of Thackeray, quit Shivsena citing flaws such as importance given to money, violence committed by the Shivsainiks (transl. Soldiers) and Bal Thackeray's support to then prime minister Indira Gandhi during the 1975 emergency.

There were also leaders from other castes such as Dattaji Salvi, Dattaji Nalawade and Wamanrao Mahadik, and those from the lower castes such as Chaggan Bhujbal, Leeladhar Dake, Bhai Shingre and Vijay Gaonkar.

Over the years, other than the Bal Thackeray, there have been twelve senior leaders in the party, out of these, eight have been from upper caste (four were Brahmins, two Chandraseniya Kayastha Prabhu and two Pathare Prabhus). Others have been either Maratha (Dattaji Salvi), Shimpi (Wamanrao Mahadik), Agri (Leeladhar Dake) or Mali (Chaggan Bhujbal). In fact, Bhujbal quit the party accusing the party is biased towards upper caste people.

The number of Dalits were also not insignificant and even after the Sena opposed the reservations proposed by the Mandal commission, there was no dent in the percentage of Other Backward Class in the party. In this way, the Sena was successful in uniting all Maharashtrians irrespective of caste under the common "Marathi umbrella". The agenda of preferential treatment for the "sons of the soil" that is Maharashtrians brought them all together.

=== Voter base ===
Shiv Sena's strength in the late 1980s and early '90s mainly came from the support of the Maratha caste - which it drew away from the Congress. Citing the large percentage of MLAs elected from Shiv Sena belonging to the Maratha caste, Vora from the University of Pune concludes that the Shiv Sena has been emerging as a "Maratha Party".

== Headquarters ==
Shivsena Bhavan (transl. House), was the central office of the Shiv Sena, located in Ram Ganesh Gadkari Chowk and Shivaji Park in Dadar, Mumbai. It was first inaugurated on 19 June 1977, and refurbished and re-inaugurated on 27 July 2006. It has a Copper Statue of Shivaji Maharaj and a large Poster of Bal Thackeray. In the 1993 Bombay bombings, terrorists planted a powerful bomb in Shivsena Bhavan; it exploded and the building received damage.

Matoshri, the house of Bal Thackeray and Uddhav Thackeray was an important building in this party. Many high-profile meetings usually held in it. It worked as a command and control centre of the party in Bal–Uddhava's regime.

== List of chief ministers ==
Following is the list of the chief ministers of Maharashtra from Shiv Sena.

No.	Portrait	Name (Birth–Death)	Tenure			Constituency	Assembly
No.	Portrait	Name (Birth–Death)	Assumed office	Left office	Time in office	Constituency	Assembly
1		Manohar Joshi (1937–2024)	14 March 1995	1 February 1999	3 years, 324 days	Dadar	9th (1995)
2		Narayan Rane (born 1952)	1 February 1999	18 October 1999	259 days	Malvan	9th (1995)
3		Uddhav Thackeray (born 1960)	28 November 2019	30 June 2022	2 years, 214 days	MLC	14th (2019)

== List of Ministers in Union Government ==
No.	Name	Term in office		Portfolio	Prime Minister
1	Manohar Joshi	19 October 1999	9 May 2002	Heavy Industries and Public Enterprises, 13th Speaker of the Lok Sabha	Atal Bihari Vajpayee
2	Anandrao Vithoba Adsul	August 2002	May 2004	Ministry of State, Finance and Company Affairs	Atal Bihari Vajpayee
3	Suresh Prabhu	13 October 1999	25 August 2002	Minister of Chemicals and Fertilizers, Ministry of Power, Ministry of Heavy Industries and Public Enterprises	Atal Bihari Vajpayee
4	Anant Geete	26 August 2002	22 May 2004	Minister of Power	Atal Bihari Vajpayee
4	Anant Geete	16 May 2014	30 May 2019	Heavy Industries and Public Enterprises	Narendra Modi
5	Arvind Sawant	30 May 2019	11 November 2019	Ministry of Heavy Industries and Public Enterprises	Narendra Modi

== Electoral performance ==
=== Lok Sabha elections ===
Year	Seats won	Change in seats
1989	1 / 48	▲1
1991	4 / 48	▲3
1996	15 / 48	▲11
1998	6 / 48	▼9
1999	15 / 48	▲9
2004	12 / 48	▼3
2009	11 / 48	▼1
2014	18 / 48	▲7
2019	18 / 48	Steady

=== Maharashtra Vidhan Sabha elections ===
Year	Party leader	Seats won	+/-	Voteshare (%)	+/- (%)	Popular vote	Outcome
1990	Bal Thackeray	52 / 288	▲52	15.94%	▲15.94%	4,733,834	Opposition
1995	Bal Thackeray	73 / 288	▲21	16.39%	▲0.45%	6,315,493	Government
1999	Bal Thackeray	69 / 288	▼4	17.33%	▲0.94%	5,692,812	Opposition
2004	Bal Thackeray	62 / 288	▼7	19.97%	▲2.64%	8,351,654	Opposition
2009	Bal Thackeray	44 / 288	▼18	16.26%	▼3.71%	7,369,030	Opposition
2014	Uddhav Thackeray	63 / 288	▲19	19.35%	▲3.09%	10,235,970	Government
2019	Uddhav Thackeray	56 / 288	▼7	16.41%	▼3.04%	9,049,789	Government

Election	Candidates	Elected	Votes	Source
1971 Lok Sabha	5		227,468	
1980 Lok Sabha	2		129,351	
1989 Lok Sabha	3	1	339,426	
1989 Goa Assembly	6		4,960	
1991 Uttar Pradesh Assembly	14	1	45,426	
1991 Lok Sabha	22	4	2,208,712	
1993 Madhya Pradesh Assembly	88		75,783	
1996 Lok Sabha	132	15	4,989,994	
1996 Haryana Assembly	17		6,700	
1997 Punjab Assembly	3		719	
1998 Lok Sabha	79	6	6,528,566	
1998 Delhi Assembly	32		9,395	
1998 Himachal Pradesh Assembly	6		2,827	
1999 Lok Sabha	63	15	5,672,412	
1999 Goa Assembly	14		5,987	
2000 Odisha Assembly	16		18,794	
2001 Kerala Assembly	1		279	
2002 Goa Assembly	15			
2004 Lok Sabha	56	12	7,056,255	
2009 Lok Sabha	22	11	6,828,382	
2014 Lok Sabha	20	18	10,262,981	
1990 Maharashtra Assembly	183	52	47,33,834(16.39%)	
1995 Maharashtra Assembly	169	73	6315493(16.39%)	
1999 Maharashtra Assembly	169	69	(17.33%)	
2004 Maharashtra Assembly	163	62	8351654 (19,97%)	
2009 Maharashtra Assembly	160	45		
2014 Maharashtra Assembly	286	63	10,235,972	
2015 Bihar Assembly	80	0	2,11,131	
2017 Goa Assembly	3	0	792	
2019 Lok Sabha	23	18	12,589,064	
2019 Maharashtra Assembly	124	56	9,049,789 (16.41)	

== Activities ==
The Sena says it has played a central role in the emancipation of 500,000 slum dwellers in the Dharavi area of Mumbai, the largest slum in Asia. However, the policy of giving free houses to slum dwellers has been controversial since it was introduced by the then Shiv Sena-BJP government.

In the 1970s, Shiv Sena was opposed to the Namantar Andolan, a Dalit-led movement to change the name of Marathwada University in Aurangabad to "Dr. Babasaheb Ambedkar University", and supported views of conservative Marathas.

In 1996, Shiv Sena organised the first and only live concert of American pop icon Michael Jackson in India to raise the funds for its business wing and to help create over two-hundred seventy thousand jobs for people of Maharashtra.

Shiv Sena got an entry in Guinness Book of World Records in 2010 for "collecting maximum blood in a day". Shiv Sena organized a blood donation camp which collected over 24,000 bottles of blood in a single day. Later this world record was broken by a blood donation camp of HDFC Bank in 2014.

In 2015 Shiv Sena announced 10,000 rupees help to each drought-affected farmer of Marathwada region, while they also announced 2 lakh rupees "reward" to Hindus family who had 5 children between 2010 and 2015 in Uttar Pradesh. As per Shiv Sena, the reason behind the "reward" was "decline in growth rate of Hindu population compared to Muslim population as per recent census".

In January 2016, the Shiv Sena demanded that the words "secular" and "socialist" be "permanently removed" from the Constitution's Preamble which were added in the 42nd amendment during the emergency. In April 2019, party member Sanjay Raut called for the burqa to be banned.

== Controversies and criticism ==
The Shiv Sena has been involved in several controversies, ranging from hooliganism, criminal activities, spreading religious bigotry, and moral policing.

In December 2003, Shiv Sena activists damaged the cricket pitch of the Agra Sport Stadium which was supposed to host the cricket match between Pakistan and India. In April 2005, Bharatiya Vidyarthi Sena, the student wing of Shiv Sena, attempted to prevent the India-Pakistan One-day international match being held in New Delhi. The protester's spokesman demanded:

India should not play cricket with Pakistan till it hands over to India 20 terrorists, including Dawood Ibrahim, and closes down militant training camps running there.

The Sena acted as a "moral police" and opposed Valentine's Day celebrations. On 14 February 2006, Bal Thackeray condemned and apologised for the violent attacks by its Shiv Sainiks on a private celebration in Mumbai. "It is said that women were beaten up in the Nallasopara incident. If that really happened, then it is a symbol of cowardice. I have always instructed Shiv Sainiks that in any situation women should not be humiliated and harassed." Thackeray and the Shiv Sena remained opposed to it, although they indicated support for an "Indian alternative".

On 20 November 2009, Shiv Sena activists attacked and vandalised the offices of Hindi and Marathi language TV news channels IBN7 and IBN-Lokmat, located in Mumbai and Pune respectively. The Shivsainik slapped IBN7's senior editor Ravindra Ambekar and then attacked IBN-Lokmat's editor Nikhil Wagle. Shiv Sena attributed the attacks to the criticisms of Bal Thackeray by the news channel over his remarks on Sachin Tendulkar. Shiv Sena's Rajya Sabha MP Sanjay Raut described the attacks as "spontaneous". Shiv Sena spokespersons tried to justify the attacks and refused to apologize for their acts of violence.

During the 2011 Cricket World Cup, Shiv Sena leaders threatened to disrupt the final in Mumbai if the Pakistani team qualified. The Sena has opposed any sporting events between India and Pakistan following the November 2008 terror attacks in Mumbai, which was perpetrated by Pakistan-based terrorist group Lashkar-e-Taiba, besides opposing inclusion of Pakistani players in the Indian Premier League.

On 18 November 2012, following the death of founder Bal Thackeray, Mumbai Police, under the pressure of Shiv Sena workers and activists, arrested a 21-year-old woman who posted a Facebook comment against him, as well as her friend who "liked" the comment. Shiv Sena members, who took it as an insult, vandalised the clinic owned by the woman's relative. The charges were subsequently dropped in January 2013, and in July 2014, the Government of Maharashtra was ordered to pay compensation of Rs 50,000 to each victim after the National Human Rights Commission noted that the detention was illegal and violated rights to freedom of speech and expression.

On 2 November 2014, during the Kiss of Love protest against moral policing, members of Shiv Sena, Bajrang Dal, Vishwa Hindu Parishad and many other right wing groups opposed and attacked protestors and threatened to strip protestors for kissing on the streets. These opposing groups claimed that public display of affection is against both Indian culture and the law of the land (under section 294 of the Indian Penal Code), though according to the Supreme Court and the Delhi High Court, kissing in public is not a criminal offence. Police took many of the Kiss of Love protestors into custody to save their lives, but were blamed for giving a free hand to counter protestors of the right wing groups.

In October 2015, Shiv Sena issued threats which enforced a ban on a scheduled concert by Pakistani classic singer Ghulam Ali. The move was adopted to appease anti-Pakistan constituents to vote for Sena in coming elections. However, in 2015 Pakistan urged the international community to take note of the activities of Shiv Sena, while Shiv Sena claimed that criticism of Shiv Sena by Pakistan vindicates "our patriotism".

On 19 October 2015, Shiv Sena activists attacked and vandalised the office of BCCI to stop a meeting between PCB and BCCI officials. The activists shouted anti-Pakistan slogans and held posters that read 'Shahryar Khan go back', determined to stop Manohar from meeting his Pakistani counterpart. Shiv Sena has also threatened to stop Pakistan's Aleem Dar from officiating in the fifth and final ODI between India and South Africa.

On 23 March 2017, while travelling to Delhi from Pune, Shiv Sena leader Ravindra Gaikwad was accused of thrashing Air India staff with his shoe, when they tried to make him disembark the plane, after being denied a business class seat because the flight was all-economy. The Delhi Police had charged him with hitting government staff on duty, as well as taking the plane ransom without departing from the plane. The incident led to the creation of No-Fly List in India, and Gaikwad was the first person to be put on the list.

On 19 July 2017, Malishka Mendonsa, a popular radio jockey of Red FM, released a parody video on YouTube targeting the Brihanmumbai Municipal Corporation for incompetence in dealing potholed roads. In response to the video, the BMC and Shiv Sena slammed her and sent a notice imposing a penalty of Rs 10,000 for defamation. As a result of the notice, several political parties criticized the BMC and Shiv Sena for intolerance towards criticism, as 2 Shiv Sena corporators sent a legal notice with a suit of Rs. 500 cr (Rs. 5 billion) against the RJ and Red FM. Malishka made another parody video against the BMC and released it on 17 July 2018, describing the incapability and pathetic conditions of Mumbai's infrastructure in the monsoons.

During the 2018 Maharashtra Council election and the 2014 Lok Sabha elections, many candidates fielded by Shiv Sena had criminal records or had criminal charges pending against them.

Following actress Kangana Ranaut's criticism of Uddhav Thackeray and his Government for mishandling the death of Sushant Singh Rajput in September 2020, Shiv Sena leaders, including Sanjay Raut issued threats to her. On the orders of Shiv Sena leaders, the Brihanmumbai Municipal Corporation demolished a portion of her house. Following the demolition, the Bombay High Court criticized the BMC and ruled in her favour, noting that BMC acted with malice and ordered BMC to pay compensation to Ranaut. Due to the nature of threats, Ranaut was given security from the Central Reserve Police Force from the Central Government.

== See also ==
- List of political parties in India
- List of Hindu nationalist political parties
