= Dadar Assembly constituency =

Former constituency of the Maharashtra legislative assembly in India

Coordinates: 19.020°N 72.843°E

Dadar
- Former constituency for the Maharashtra Legislative Assembly

Constituency details
- Country: India
- Region: Western India
- State: Maharashtra
- Lok Sabha constituency: Mumbai South Central
- Established: 1955
- Abolished: 2008
- Total electors: 1,26,381
- Reservation: None

Dadar Vidhan Sabha seat was one of the constituencies of Maharashtra Vidhan Sabha, in India. It was a segment of Mumbai South Central Lok Sabha constituency. Dadar seat existed until the 2004 elections after which it was merged into Mahim seat in 2008.

== Members of Vidhan Sabha ==
Year	Member	Party
1957	Trimbak Ramchandra Naravne	Independent politician
1962	Pralhad Keshav Atre	Independent politician
1967	Waman Shankar Matkar	Indian National Congress
1972	Waman Shankar Matkar	Indian National Congress
1978	Hemachandra Shankar Gupte	Janata Party
1980	Sharayu Govind Thakur	Indian National Congress
1985	Sharayu Govind Thakur	Indian National Congress
1990	Manohar Joshi	Shiv Sena
1995	Manohar Joshi	Shiv Sena
1999	Vishakha Raut	Shiv Sena
2004	Sada Sarvankar	Shiv Sena
After 2008 See: Mahim

== Election results ==
=== Assembly Election 2004 ===
2004 Maharashtra Legislative Assembly election : Dadar
Party	Candidate	Votes	%	±%
SS	Sada Sarvankar	42,390	57.12%	▲8.63
INC	Bhosale Shahaji Alias Rajan	29,341	39.54%	▲10.52
BSP	Ulka Harshad Thakur	790	1.06%	New
Shivrajya Party	Bhausaheb Sadashiv Shinde	629	0.85%	New
Margin of victory		13,049	17.58%	▼1.89
Turnout		74,208	58.72%	▲6.93
Total valid votes		74,207		
Registered electors		126,381		▼7.50
SS hold		Swing	▲8.63	

=== Assembly Election 1999 ===
1999 Maharashtra Legislative Assembly election : Dadar
Party	Candidate	Votes	%	±%
SS	Vishakha Raut	34,308	48.49%	▼19.85
INC	Rajan Bhosle	20,529	29.02%	▲5.25
NCP	Ramesh Parab	13,182	18.63%	New
ABS	Sanjay Y. Kambli	682	0.96%	New
Independent	Madhav Deshpande	618	0.87%	New
Independent	Gajanan (Gaja) Sadanand Pednekar	586	0.83%	New
Independent	Ulka Harshad Thakur	532	0.75%	New
Margin of victory		13,779	19.48%	▼25.10
Turnout		70,748	51.78%	▼14.31
Total valid votes		70,747		
Registered electors		136,624		▲4.77
SS hold		Swing	▼19.85	

=== Assembly Election 1995 ===
1995 Maharashtra Legislative Assembly election : Dadar
Party	Candidate	Votes	%	±%
SS	Manohar Joshi	58,901	68.34%	▲13.35
INC	Sharayu Govind Thakur	20,482	23.77%	▼4.38
Independent	Uke Dhanraj Mahadev	3,228	3.75%	New
Independent	Sathe Bharat Pradip	1,054	1.22%	New
Independent	Satish Mangaldas Motiwale	746	0.87%	New
Independent	Xavier Robert Joseph	553	0.64%	New
Margin of victory		38,419	44.58%	▲17.73
Turnout		87,344	66.98%	▲3.00
Total valid votes		86,184		
Registered electors		130,400		▼4.98
SS hold		Swing	▲13.35	

=== Assembly Election 1990 ===
1990 Maharashtra Legislative Assembly election : Dadar
Party	Candidate	Votes	%	±%
SS	Manohar Joshi	47,617	54.99%	New
INC	Bhaurao Patil	24,367	28.14%	▲0.75
CPI(M)	Jayawant Moreshwar Patil	13,440	15.52%	New
Margin of victory		23,250	26.85%	▲21.92
Turnout		87,445	63.72%	▲7.95
Total valid votes		86,587		
Registered electors		137,234		▲14.32
SS gain from INC		Swing	▲27.60	

=== Assembly Election 1985 ===
1985 Maharashtra Legislative Assembly election : Dadar
Party	Candidate	Votes	%	±%
INC	Sharayu Govind Thakur	18,134	27.39%	New
Independent	Sudhir Joshi	14,872	22.47%	New
Independent	Dada Samant	14,608	22.07%	New
BJP	Ramesh Medhekar	10,398	15.71%	▼2.26
CPI	Comjaiwant Patil	5,794	8.75%	▼18.03
Independent	Vithal Sawant	694	1.05%	New
Independent	Ramchandra Hatiskar	620	0.94%	New
Margin of victory		3,262	4.93%	▼1.72
Turnout		66,893	55.73%	▲11.10
Total valid votes		66,195		
Registered electors		120,040		▼4.06
INC gain from INC(I)		Swing	▼6.03	

=== Assembly Election 1980 ===
1980 Maharashtra Legislative Assembly election : Dadar
Party	Candidate	Votes	%	±%
INC(I)	Thakur Sharayu Govind	18,421	33.43%	▲18.48
CPI	Jayawant Moreshwar Patil	14,760	26.79%	▲13.70
JP	Gupte Hemchandra S.	10,795	19.59%	▼26.63
BJP	Gokhale Keshav Waman	9,903	17.97%	New
[[Janata Party (Secular) Charan Singh|Janata Party (Secular) Charan Singh]]	Tribineram Yadav	948	1.72%	New
Margin of victory		3,661	6.64%	▼20.40
Turnout		55,684	44.50%	▼26.57
Total valid votes		55,104		
Registered electors		125,120		▲5.02
INC(I) gain from JP		Swing	▼12.79	

=== Assembly Election 1978 ===
1978 Maharashtra Legislative Assembly election : Dadar
Party	Candidate	Votes	%	±%
JP	Hemachandra Shankar Gupte	38,879	46.22%	New
SS	Manohar Joshi	16,131	19.18%	▼0.27
INC(I)	Bhaurao Patil	12,579	14.95%	New
CPI	Jayawant Moreshwar Patil	11,004	13.08%	▼4.72
INC	Waman Shankar Matkar	4,372	5.20%	▼37.72
Margin of victory		22,748	27.04%	▲3.57
Turnout		85,403	71.68%	▼0.47
Total valid votes		84,121		
Registered electors		119,138		▲19.98
JP gain from INC		Swing	▲3.30	

=== Assembly Election 1972 ===
1972 Maharashtra Legislative Assembly election : Dadar
Party	Candidate	Votes	%	±%
INC	Waman Shankar Matkar	30,292	42.92%	▲3.47
SS	Sudhir Gajanan Joshi	13,724	19.45%	New
CPI	Jayawant Moreshwar Patil	12,562	17.80%	▼13.17
SSP	Pramila M. Dandavate	6,290	8.91%	New
ABJS	Gayamwkad Sharad Bajirao	3,210	4.55%	▼7.24
INC(O)	Madhav Narayan Birje	2,845	4.03%	New
Margin of victory		16,568	23.47%	▲15.00
Turnout		72,132	72.64%	▲2.30
Total valid votes		70,578		
Registered electors		99,297		▲5.54
INC hold		Swing	▲3.47	

=== Assembly Election 1967 ===
1967 Maharashtra Legislative Assembly election : Dadar
Party	Candidate	Votes	%	±%
INC	Waman Shankar Matkar	25,527	39.45%	▼0.17
CPI	Jayawant Moreshwar Patil	20,042	30.97%	New
PSP	M. R. Dandavate	11,509	17.79%	▲10.44
ABJS	M. D. Mantri	7,629	11.79%	▼0.47
Margin of victory		5,485	8.48%	▲7.34
Turnout		68,181	72.47%	▲1.08
Total valid votes		64,707		
Registered electors		94,082		▲15.54
INC gain from Independent		Swing	▼1.31	

=== Assembly Election 1962 ===
1962 Maharashtra Legislative Assembly election : Dadar
Party	Candidate	Votes	%	±%
Independent	Pralhad Keshav Atre	22,469	40.76%	New
INC	Trimbak Ramchandra Narawane	21,843	39.62%	▲11.68
ABJS	Dattatraya Shankar Pradhan	6,761	12.26%	New
PSP	Anusaya Shridhar Limaye	4,052	7.35%	New
Margin of victory		626	1.14%	▼38.88
Turnout		57,058	70.07%	▼7.54
Total valid votes		55,125		
Registered electors		81,426		▲22.18
Independent hold		Swing	▼27.20	

=== Assembly Election 1957 ===
1957 Bombay State Legislative Assembly election : Dadar
Party	Candidate	Votes	%	±%
Independent	Trimbak Ramchandra Naravne	34,080	67.96%	New
INC	Hirlekar Yamunarao Krishnarao	14,013	27.95%	New
Independent	Birje Madhav Narayan	1,476	2.94%	New
RRP	Thakur Bechansingh Jagbir Singh	575	1.15%	New
Margin of victory		20,067	40.02%	
Turnout		50,144	75.24%	
Total valid votes		50,144		
Registered electors		66,646		
Independent win (new seat)				

== See also ==
- List of constituencies of Maharashtra Legislative Assembly
