= Mumbai South Central Lok Sabha constituency =

Constituency of the Indian parliament in Maharashtra

Coordinates: 19.0°N 72.9°E

Mumbai South Central Lok Sabha
- Lok Sabha constituency
- Interactive Map Outlining Mumbai South Central Lok Sabha Constituency

Constituency details
- Country: India
- Region: Western India
- State: Maharashtra
- Assembly constituencies: Anushakti Nagar; Chembur; Dharavi; Sion Koliwada; Wadala; Mahim
- Established: 1952
- Total electors: 14,74,405(2024)
- Reservation: None

Member of Parliament
- 18th Lok Sabha
- Incumbent Anil Desai
- Party: SS(UBT)
- Alliance: INDIA
- Elected year: 2024
- Preceded by: Rahul Shewale

Mumbai South Central Lok Sabha constituency (formerly, Bombay South Central Lok Sabha constituency) is one of the 48 Lok Sabha (parliamentary) constituencies in Maharashtra state in western India.

== Demographics ==
The South Central Lok Sabha constituency is quiet unique as it has voters from various communities, classes, sects & groups. The constituency has around 2.5 lakh South Indian voters. There around 5 lakh voters from North Indian mostly from UP & Bihar, 3.2 lakh Muslims and about 4.2 lakh marathi voters in total. South Indian voters are concentrated in Dharavi & Sion Koliwada. Migrants from UP/Bihar are concentrated around Anushakti Nagar, Chembur, Dharavi & up to some extent in Wadala. Muslims are concentrated in Anushakti Nagar, Dharavi & Sion Koliwada. Christian population are scattered evenly but is seen mostly in Mahim also have one of the oldest St. Michael's Church. Buddhist are seen predominantly in Chembur & Dharavi.

== Assembly segments ==
Presently, after the implementation of the Presidential notification on delimitation on 19 February 2008, Mumbai South Central Lok Sabha constituency comprises six Vidhan Sabha (legislative assembly) segments. These segments are

| # | Name | District | Member | Party | Leading (in 2024) |
|---|---|---|---|---|---|
| 172 | Anushakti Nagar | Mumbai Suburban | Sana Malik | NCP | SS(UBT) |
| 173 | Chembur | Mumbai Suburban | Tukaram Kate | SHS | SS(UBT) |
| 178 | Dharavi (SC) | Mumbai City | Jyoti Gaikwad | INC | SS(UBT) |
| 179 | Sion Koliwada | Mumbai City | R. Tamil Selvan | BJP | SS(UBT) |
| 180 | Wadala | Mumbai City | Kalidas Kolambkar | BJP | SHS |
| 181 | Mahim | Mumbai City | Mahesh Sawant | SS(UBT) | SHS |

== Members of Parliament ==
| Year | Name | Party |
|---|---|---|
| 1952 | Jayashri Raiji | Indian National Congress |
| 1957 | Shripad Amrit Dange | Communist Party of India |
| 1962 | Vithal Balkrishna Gandhi | Indian National Congress |
| 1967 | Shripad Amrit Dange | Communist Party of India |
| 1971 | Abdul Kader Salebhoy | Indian National Congress |
| 1977 | B. C. Kamble | Janata Party |
| 1980 | R. R. Bhole | Indian National Congress |
| 1984 | Dutta Samant | Independent |
| 1989 | Wamanrao Mahadik | Shiv Sena |
| 1991 | Mohan Rawale | Shiv Sena |
| 1996 | Mohan Rawale | Shiv Sena |
| 1998 | Mohan Rawale | Shiv Sena |
| 1999 | Mohan Rawale | Shiv Sena |
| 2004 | Mohan Rawale | Shiv Sena |
| 2009 | Eknath Gaikwad | Indian National Congress |
| 2014 | Rahul Shewale | Shiv Sena |
| 2019 | Rahul Shewale | Shiv Sena |
| 2024 | Anil Desai | Shiv Sena (UBT) |

== Election results ==
=== 1999 ===
1999 Indian general election: Mumbai South Central
| Party | Candidate | Votes | % | ±% |
|---|---|---|---|---|
| SS | Mohan Rawale | 1,76,323 | 47.97 | |
| SP | Majeed Memon | 97,287 | 26.47 | |
| BBM | Dada Samant | 77,747 | 21.15 | |
| Independent | P K Gaikwad | 16,248 | 4.42 | |
| Majority | | 79,036 | 21.50 | |
| Turnout | | 3,69,130 | 45.43 | |
| SS hold | | Swing | | |

=== 2004 ===
2004 Indian general elections: Mumbai South Central
| Party | Candidate | Votes | % | ±% |
|---|---|---|---|---|
| SS | Mohan Rawale | 1,28,536 | 36.94 | −11.03 |
| NCP | Sachin Ahir | 1,06,348 | 30.56 | |
| ABS | Arun Gawli | 92,210 | 26.50 | |
| SP | T.K. Choudhary | 10,104 | 2.90 | −23.57 |
| BSP | Abdul Malik Choudhary | 4,690 | 1.35 | |
| Independent | Pukhraj Chunnilal Jain | 2,677 | 0.77 | |
| IUML | Ansari Husain Ahmed | 1921 | 0.55 | |
| Akhil Bharatiya Jan Sangh | Yashwant (Prakash) Shinde | 1,486 | 0.43 | |
| Majority | | 22,188 | 6.38 | −15.12 |
| Turnout | | 3,47,980 | 49.40 | +3.97 |
| SS hold | | Swing | -11.03 | |

=== 2009 ===
2009 Indian general elections: Mumbai South Central
| Party | Candidate | Votes | % | ±% |
|---|---|---|---|---|
| INC | Eknath Mahadeo Gaikwad | 2,57,523 | 43.00 | N/A |
| SS | Suresh Anant Gambhir | 1,81,817 | 30.36 | −6.58 |
| MNS | Shweta Vivek Parulkar | 1,08,341 | 18.09 | N/A |
| BSP | Pravin Ramchandra Barve | 18,427 | 3.08 | +1.73 |
| PRCP | Rajendra Ganpat Jadhav | 5,986 | 1.00 | N/A |
| Majority | | 75,706 | 12.64 | +6.26 |
| Turnout | | 5,98,845 | 39.50 | −9.90 |
| INC gain from SS | | Swing | +6.06 | |

=== 2014 ===
2014 Indian general elections: Mumbai South Central
| Party | Candidate | Votes | % | ±% |
|---|---|---|---|---|
| SS | Rahul Ramesh Shewale | 3,81,008 | 49.57 | +19.21 |
| INC | Eknath Mahadeo Gaikwad | 2,42,828 | 31.59 | −11.41 |
| MNS | Aditya Rajan Shirodkar | 73,096 | 9.51 | −8.58 |
| AAP | Sundar Balakrishnan | 27,687 | 3.60 | N/A |
| BSP | Ganesh Aiyyar | 14,762 | 1.92 | −1.16 |
| NOTA | None of the Above | 9,571 | 1.25 | N/A |
| Majority | | 1,38,180 | 17.98 | +5.34 |
| Turnout | | 7,68,627 | 53.09 | +13.59 |
| SS gain from INC | | Swing | +15.32 | |

=== 2019 ===
2019 Indian general elections: Mumbai South Central
| Party | Candidate | Votes | % | ±% |
|---|---|---|---|---|
| SS | Rahul Ramesh Shewale | 424,913 | 53.30 | +3.73 |
| INC | Eknath Mahadeo Gaikwad | 272,774 | 34.21 | +2.62 |
| VBA | Sanjay Sushil Bhosale | 63,412 | 7.95 | New |
| BSP | Ahmedshakil Sagirahmed Shaikh | 8,635 | 1.08 | −0.84 |
| DMSK | Godfrey Noble | 2,199 | 0.28 | N/A |
| NOTA | None of the Above | 13,834 | 1.74 | +0.49 |
| Majority | | 1,52,139 | 19.09 | +1.11 |
| Turnout | | 7,97,903 | 55.40 | +2.31 |
| SS hold | | Swing | +3.73 | |

=== 2024 ===
2024 Indian general election: Mumbai South Central
| Party | Candidate | Votes | % | ±% |
|---|---|---|---|---|
| SS(UBT) | Anil Desai | 395,138 | 49.73 | New |
| SHS | Rahul Ramesh Shewale | 3,41,754 | 43.01 | ▼10.29 |
| VBA | Abul Hasan Ali Hasan Khan | 23,867 | 3.00 | ▼4.95 |
| NOTA | None of the Above | 13,423 | 1.69 | ▼0.05 |
| Majority | | 53,384 | 6.75 | ▼12.34 |
| Turnout | | 7,94,872 | 53.90 | ▼1.50 |
| SS(UBT) gain from SHS | | Swing | | |

== See also ==
- Mumbai
- List of constituencies of the Lok Sabha
