= Worli Prabhadevi Assembly constituency =

Constituency of the Maharashtra legislative assembly in India

Worli Prabhadevi
- Former constituency for the Maharashtra Legislative Assembly

Constituency details
- Country: India
- Region: Western India
- State: Maharashtra
- Established: 1952
- Abolished: 1955
- Total electors: 51,310

Worli Prabhadevi Assembly constituency was an assembly constituency in the India state of Maharashtra. After 1955 Delimitation act, Worli Prabhadevi split into Worli, Dadar and Parel.

== Members of the Legislative Assembly ==
Election	Member	Party
1952	Madhav Narayan Birje	Indian National Congress

== Election results ==
=== Assembly Election 1952 ===
1952 Bombay State Legislative Assembly election : Worli Prabhadevi
Party	Candidate	Votes	%	±%
INC	Madhav Narayan Birje	8,434	30.08%	New
Socialist	Peter Alvares	7,029	25.07%	New
CPI	Mirajkar, Shantaram Sawalaram	5,882	20.98%	New
Independent	Matkar Waman Shankar	4,426	15.79%	New
Independent	Pande, Ramnath Mahabir	1,578	5.63%	New
RRP	Thakur, Surajbalisingh Rameshwarsingh	690	2.46%	New
Margin of victory		1,405	5.01%	
Turnout		28,039	54.65%	
Total valid votes		28,039		
Registered electors		51,310		
INC win (new seat)				
