= Mahim Assembly constituency =

Constituency of the Maharashtra legislative assembly in India

Coordinates: 19°02′24.49″N 72°49′54.10″E

Mahim
- Constituency No. 181 for the Maharashtra Legislative Assembly

Constituency details
- Country: India
- Region: Western India
- State: Maharashtra
- District: Mumbai City
- Lok Sabha constituency: Mumbai South Central
- Established: 1955
- Total electors: 225,975
- Reservation: None

Member of Legislative Assembly
- 15th Maharashtra Legislative Assembly
- Incumbent Mahesh Sawant
- Party: SS(UBT)
- Alliance: MVA
- Elected year: 2024

Mahim Assembly constituency is a part of Maharashtra Vidhan Sabha, in Western India; it is a segment of Mumbai South Central (Lok Sabha constituency).

== Overview ==
It is a part of Mumbai South Central Lok Sabha constituency along with five other assembly constituencies, viz Dharavi, Sion Koliwada, Wadala, from Mumbai City district and Chembur and Anushakti Nagar from Mumbai Suburban district.

== Members of the Legislative Assembly ==
| Year | Member | Party |
|---|---|---|
| 1957 | Frederick Michael Pinto | Praja Socialist Party |
| 1962 | Frederick Michael Pinto | Praja Socialist Party |
| 1967 | Frederick Michael Pinto | Indian National Congress |
| 1972 | Frederick Michael Pinto | Indian National Congress |
| 1978 | Frederick Michael Pinto | Janata Party |
| 1980 | Frederick Michael Pinto | Janata Party |
| 1985 | Sham Shetty | Indian National Congress |
| 1990 | Suresh Anant Gambhir | Shiv Sena |
| 1995 | Suresh Anant Gambhir | Shiv Sena |
| 1999 | Suresh Anant Gambhir | Shiv Sena |
| 2004 | Suresh Anant Gambhir | Shiv Sena |
Major boundary changes
| 2009 | Nitin Vijayakumar Sardesai | Maharashtra Navnirman Sena |
| 2014 | Sada Sarvankar | Shiv Sena |
| 2019 | Sada Sarvankar | Shiv Sena |
| 2024 | Mahesh Baliram Sawant | Shiv Sena (UBT) |

== Election results ==
=== Assembly Election 2024 ===
2024 Maharashtra Legislative Assembly election : Mahim
| Party | Candidate | Votes | % | ±% |
|---|---|---|---|---|
| SS(UBT) | Mahesh Baliram Sawant | 50,213 | 37.74 | New |
| SS | Sada Sarvankar | 48,897 | 36.75 | ▼14.31 |
| MNS | Amit Raj Thackeray | 33,062 | 24.85 | ▼10.69 |
| NOTA | None of the Above | 1,553 | 1.17 | ▼2.09 |
| Margin of victory | | 1,316 | 0.99 | ▼14.54 |
| Turnout | | 134,599 | 59.56 | ▲7.87 |
| Total valid votes | | 133,046 | | |
| Registered electors | | 225,975 | | ▼4.04 |
| SS(UBT) gain from SS | | Swing | ▼13.32 | |

=== Assembly Election 2019 ===
2019 Maharashtra Legislative Assembly election : Mahim
| Party | Candidate | Votes | % | ±% |
|---|---|---|---|---|
| SS | Sada Sarvankar | 61,337 | 51.06 | ▲16.61 |
| MNS | Sandeep Sudhakar Deshpande | 42,690 | 35.54 | ▲5.51 |
| INC | Pravin Naik | 15,246 | 12.69 | ▲3.82 |
| NOTA | None of the Above | 3,912 | 3.26 | ▲1.83 |
| Independent | Mohanish Ravindra Raul | 843 | 0.70 | New |
| Margin of victory | | 18,647 | 15.52 | ▲11.10 |
| Turnout | | 124,078 | 52.69 | ▼6.76 |
| Total valid votes | | 120,116 | | |
| Registered electors | | 235,479 | | ▲1.25 |
| SS hold | | Swing | ▲16.61 | |

=== Assembly Election 2014 ===
2014 Maharashtra Legislative Assembly election : Mahim
| Party | Candidate | Votes | % | ±% |
|---|---|---|---|---|
| SS | Sada Sarvankar | 46,291 | 34.46 | ▲6.24 |
| MNS | Nitin Vijayakumar Sardesai | 40,350 | 30.04 | ▼7.78 |
| BJP | Ambekar Vilas Ramesh | 33,446 | 24.90 | New |
| INC | Pravin Naik | 11,917 | 8.87 | ▼22.02 |
| NOTA | None of the Above | 1,918 | 1.43 | New |
| NCP | Ramesh Parab | 1,219 | 0.91 | New |
| Margin of victory | | 5,941 | 4.42 | ▼2.50 |
| Turnout | | 136,276 | 58.60 | ▲7.37 |
| Total valid votes | | 134,341 | | |
| Registered electors | | 232,566 | | ▼9.05 |
| SS gain from MNS | | Swing | ▼3.36 | |

=== Assembly Election 2009 ===
2009 Maharashtra Legislative Assembly election : Mahim
| Party | Candidate | Votes | % | ±% |
|---|---|---|---|---|
| MNS | Nitin Vijayakumar Sardesai | 48,734 | 37.82 | New |
| INC | Sadananad Shankar Saravankar | 39,808 | 30.89 | ▼15.20 |
| SS | Adesh Chandrakant Bandekar | 36,364 | 28.22 | ▼20.62 |
| Independent | Vasant Bhaguji Jadhav | 1,890 | 1.47 | New |
| Margin of victory | | 8,926 | 6.93 | ▲4.18 |
| Turnout | | 128,865 | 50.40 | ▲0.66 |
| Total valid votes | | 128,862 | | |
| Registered electors | | 255,706 | | ▲74.56 |
| MNS gain from SS | | Swing | ▼11.02 | |

=== Assembly Election 2004 ===
2004 Maharashtra Legislative Assembly election : Mahim
| Party | Candidate | Votes | % | ±% |
|---|---|---|---|---|
| SS | Suresh Anant Gambhir | 35,585 | 48.84 | ▼7.88 |
| INC | Ajit Pandurang Sawant | 33,581 | 46.09 | New |
| Independent | Girish Vinayak Raut | 1,529 | 2.10 | New |
| Independent | Viraj Satish Ajgaonkar | 537 | 0.74 | New |
| BSP | Shaikh Mohammed Hussain Mohammed Raza | 530 | 0.73 | New |
| Margin of victory | | 2,004 | 2.75 | ▼30.44 |
| Turnout | | 72,855 | 49.74 | ▲1.46 |
| Total valid votes | | 72,855 | | |
| Registered electors | | 146,485 | | ▼1.87 |
| SS hold | | Swing | ▼7.88 | |

=== Assembly Election 1999 ===
1999 Maharashtra Legislative Assembly election : Mahim
| Party | Candidate | Votes | % | ±% |
|---|---|---|---|---|
| SS | Suresh Anant Gambhir | 40,883 | 56.72 | ▲3.95 |
| BBM | Chaudhari Abdul Wahab Mohammadali | 16,965 | 23.54 | New |
| NCP | Kulkarni Sharadchandra Shantaram | 11,272 | 15.64 | New |
| Independent | Shripad Martand Korde | 1,860 | 2.58 | New |
| Independent | Khan Khamruddin Haji Jamyat Khan | 1,093 | 1.52 | New |
| Margin of victory | | 23,918 | 33.19 | ▲6.28 |
| Turnout | | 72,079 | 48.28 | ▼13.65 |
| Total valid votes | | 72,073 | | |
| Registered electors | | 149,283 | | ▲7.01 |
| SS hold | | Swing | ▲3.95 | |

=== Assembly Election 1995 ===
1995 Maharashtra Legislative Assembly election : Mahim
| Party | Candidate | Votes | % | ±% |
|---|---|---|---|---|
| SS | Suresh Anant Gambhir | 45,601 | 52.78 | ▲9.07 |
| INC | Ramanand Laud | 22,356 | 25.88 | ▼3.95 |
| SP | Martis Clifford Lawarence | 16,252 | 18.81 | New |
| SJP(R) | Chandrakant Shivagan | 889 | 1.03 | New |
| Margin of victory | | 23,245 | 26.90 | ▲13.03 |
| Turnout | | 88,091 | 63.15 | ▲3.76 |
| Total valid votes | | 86,400 | | |
| Registered electors | | 139,505 | | ▼5.64 |
| SS hold | | Swing | ▲9.07 | |

=== Assembly Election 1990 ===
1990 Maharashtra Legislative Assembly election : Mahim
| Party | Candidate | Votes | % | ±% |
|---|---|---|---|---|
| SS | Suresh Anant Gambhir | 37,587 | 43.70 | New |
| INC | Shyam Shetty | 25,652 | 29.83 | ▼9.25 |
| JD | Martis Clifford Lawrence | 22,107 | 25.71 | New |
| Margin of victory | | 11,935 | 13.88 | ▲9.84 |
| Turnout | | 87,097 | 58.91 | ▲9.08 |
| Total valid votes | | 86,002 | | |
| Registered electors | | 147,848 | | ▲21.12 |
| SS gain from INC | | Swing | ▲4.63 | |

=== Assembly Election 1985 ===
1985 Maharashtra Legislative Assembly election : Mahim
| Party | Candidate | Votes | % | ±% |
|---|---|---|---|---|
| INC | Sham Shetty | 23,416 | 39.08 | New |
| JP | Pinto Frederic Michael | 20,999 | 35.04 | ▼17.20 |
| Independent | Suresh A. Gambhir | 14,053 | 23.45 | New |
| LKD | Dossani Abdul Razzak Mohammed Ishaque | 520 | 0.87 | New |
| Independent | Chimanbhai Goyal | 375 | 0.63 | New |
| Margin of victory | | 2,417 | 4.03 | ▼0.46 |
| Turnout | | 60,713 | 49.74 | ▲7.68 |
| Total valid votes | | 59,922 | | |
| Registered electors | | 122,070 | | ▲4.57 |
| INC gain from JP | | Swing | ▼13.17 | |

=== Assembly Election 1980 ===
1980 Maharashtra Legislative Assembly election : Mahim
| Party | Candidate | Votes | % | ±% |
|---|---|---|---|---|
| JP | Frederick Michael Pinto | 25,254 | 52.25 | ▼12.15 |
| INC(I) | Kunte Prabhakar Kashinath | 23,083 | 47.75 | ▲34.88 |
| Margin of victory | | 2,171 | 4.49 | ▼47.03 |
| Turnout | | 48,990 | 41.97 | ▼18.25 |
| Total valid votes | | 48,337 | | |
| Registered electors | | 116,734 | | ▲4.83 |
| JP hold | | Swing | ▼12.15 | |

=== Assembly Election 1978 ===
1978 Maharashtra Legislative Assembly election : Mahim
| Party | Candidate | Votes | % | ±% |
|---|---|---|---|---|
| JP | Frederick Michael Pinto | 42,774 | 64.39 | New |
| INC(I) | Chitre P. M. | 8,550 | 12.87 | New |
| SS | Keny Ramkrishna Mangesh | 8,061 | 12.13 | ▼21.94 |
| INC | Ashalata Vithalrao Toraskar | 6,697 | 10.08 | ▼53.52 |
| Margin of victory | | 34,224 | 51.52 | ▲21.99 |
| Turnout | | 67,390 | 60.52 | ▼9.66 |
| Total valid votes | | 66,428 | | |
| Registered electors | | 111,352 | | ▲24.26 |
| JP gain from INC | | Swing | ▲0.79 | |

=== Assembly Election 1972 ===
1972 Maharashtra Legislative Assembly election : Mahim
| Party | Candidate | Votes | % | ±% |
|---|---|---|---|---|
| INC | Frederick Michael Pinto | 39,508 | 63.61 | ▲13.59 |
| SS | Hemchandra Gupte | 21,167 | 34.08 | New |
| SWA | Desmondanthony D. Souza | 1,078 | 1.74 | ▼0.42 |
| Margin of victory | | 18,341 | 29.53 | ▲5.23 |
| Turnout | | 63,043 | 70.35 | ▲0.68 |
| Total valid votes | | 62,114 | | |
| Registered electors | | 89,614 | | ▲9.26 |
| INC hold | | Swing | ▲13.59 | |

=== Assembly Election 1967 ===
1967 Maharashtra Legislative Assembly election : Mahim
| Party | Candidate | Votes | % | ±% |
|---|---|---|---|---|
| INC | Frederick Michael Pinto | 28,152 | 50.01 | ▲13.74 |
| ABJS | D. S. Pradhan | 14,474 | 25.71 | New |
| RPI | V. M. Bhave | 11,910 | 21.16 | ▼1.29 |
| SWA | R. D. Trikha | 1,216 | 2.16 | New |
| Independent | V. R. Patke | 540 | 0.96 | New |
| Margin of victory | | 13,678 | 24.30 | ▲19.30 |
| Turnout | | 58,822 | 71.72 | ▲12.17 |
| Total valid votes | | 56,292 | | |
| Registered electors | | 82,018 | | ▲0.42 |
| INC gain from PSP | | Swing | ▲8.73 | |

=== Assembly Election 1962 ===
1962 Maharashtra Legislative Assembly election : Mahim
| Party | Candidate | Votes | % | ±% |
|---|---|---|---|---|
| PSP | Frederick Michael Pinto | 19,036 | 41.28 | ▼17.33 |
| INC | Lakshmikant Narayan Welingker | 16,729 | 36.27 | ▼5.12 |
| RPI | Keshav Laxman Kambale | 10,353 | 22.45 | New |
| Margin of victory | | 2,307 | 5.00 | ▼12.21 |
| Turnout | | 48,923 | 59.90 | ▼11.19 |
| Total valid votes | | 46,118 | | |
| Registered electors | | 81,679 | | ▲40.25 |
| PSP hold | | Swing | ▼17.33 | |

=== Assembly Election 1957 ===
1957 Bombay State Legislative Assembly election : Mahim
| Party | Candidate | Votes | % | ±% |
|---|---|---|---|---|
| PSP | Frederick Michael Pinto | 23,090 | 58.60 | New |
| INC | Kataria Takandas Hemraj | 16,310 | 41.40 | New |
| Margin of victory | | 6,780 | 17.21 | New |
| Turnout | | 39,400 | 67.65 | New |
| Total valid votes | | 39,400 | | |
| Registered electors | | 58,239 | | New |
| PSP gain from INC | | Swing | | |
