= Sada Sarvankar =

Indian politician

Member of Maharashtra Legislative Assembly
- In office 2014–2024
- Preceded by: Nitin Sardesai
- Succeeded by: Mahesh Sawant
- Constituency: Mahim
- In office 2004–2009
- Preceded by: Vishakha Raut
- Constituency: Dadar (Vidhan Sabha constituency)

Personal details
- Party: Shiv Sena
- Children: Samadhan Sarvankar, Priya Gurav
- Occupation: Politician

Sada Sarvankar is an Indian politician and Shiv Sena leader from Dadar, Mumbai. He is a former member of the Maharashtra Legislative Assembly representing the Mahim Assembly Constituency. He had been elected to Vidhan Sabha for three terms in 2004, 2014 and 2019. Before that he served as Corporator in Brihanmumbai Municipal Corporation (BMC) for three terms from 1992 to 2004 till he was asked to contest Dadar Constituency in 2004.

== Defection from the Shiv Sena to the Indian National Congress in 2009 ==
Sada Sarvankar had defected from the Shiv Sena to the Indian National Congress because he was denied a ticket by the Shiv Sena for the 2009 Maharashtra Legislative Assembly election. Sarvankar joined Congress in the presence of Narayan Rane who is claimed to have engineered Sarvankar's defection. The Congress fielded Sada Sarvankar from the Mahim Assembly seat for the 2009 Maharashtra Legislative Assembly election, a move which had upset many members of the Congress in Maharashtra.

== Rejoined the Shiv Sena in 2012 ==
Sada Sarvankar returned to the Shiv Sena before the 2014 Maharashtra Legislative Assembly election, contested and won in Mahim Assembly constituency.

== Positions held ==
- 1992: Elected as Corporator in Brihanmumbai Municipal Corporation (1st term)
- 1997: Re-elected as Corporator in Brihanmumbai Municipal Corporation (2nd term)
- 2002: Re-elected as Corporator in Brihanmumbai Municipal Corporation (3rd term)
- 2002-04: Standing Committee Chairman
- 2004: Elected to Maharashtra Legislative Assembly
- 2014: Re-elected to Maharashtra Legislative Assembly
- 2019: Re-elected to Maharashtra Legislative Assembly
