= Regional Congress =

Regional Congress may refer to:

- Congress of Local and Regional Authorities, an assembly of the Council of Europe
- Mumbai Regional Congress Committee, a unit of the Indian National Congress in Mumbai
- Regional Congress of Peasants, Workers and Insurgents, the principle authority of the Makhnovshchina
