= Sion Koliwada Assembly constituency =

Constituency of the Maharashtra legislative assembly in India

Coordinates: 19.040°N 72.864°E

Sion Koliwada
- Constituency No. 179 for the Maharashtra Legislative Assembly

Constituency details
- Country: India
- Region: Western India
- State: Maharashtra
- District: Mumbai City
- Lok Sabha constituency: Mumbai South Central
- Established: 2008
- Total electors: 283,296
- Reservation: None

Member of Legislative Assembly
- 15th Maharashtra Legislative Assembly
- Incumbent Captain R. Tamil Selvan
- Party: Bharatiya Janata Party
- Elected year: 2024

Sion Koliwada Assembly constituency is one of the ten constituencies of the Maharashtra Vidhan Sabha located in Mumbai City district.

== Overview ==
Sion Koliwada (constituency number 179) is one of the 10 Vidhan Sabha constituencies located in the Mumbai City district. Number of electorates in 2009 was 290,338 (male 167,923, female 122,514) 78,913 are minority voters.

It is a part of Mumbai South Central Lok Sabha constituency along with five other assembly constituencies, Dharavi, Wadala and Mahim from Mumbai City district and Chembur and Anushakti Nagar from Mumbai Suburban district.

== Members of the Legislative Assembly ==
Year	Member	Party
Until 2008: Constituency did not exist
2009	Jagannath Shetty	Indian National Congress
2014	R. Tamil Selvan	Bharatiya Janata Party
2019	R. Tamil Selvan	Bharatiya Janata Party
2024	R. Tamil Selvan	Bharatiya Janata Party

== Election results ==
=== Assembly Election 2024 ===
2024 Maharashtra Legislative Assembly election : Sion Koliwada
Party	Candidate	Votes	%	±%
BJP	Captain R Tamil Selvan	73,429	48.86	▲5.54
INC	Ganesh Kumar Yadav	65,534	43.61	▲11.30
MNS	Sanjay Prabhakar Bhogle	5,729	3.81	▼7.00
VBA	Adv. Rajguru Balkrishna Kadam	2,219	1.48	▼7.65
NOTA	None of the Above	1,893	1.26	▼1.31
BSP	Vilas Dhondu Kamble	1,216	0.81	▼0.55
Margin of victory		7,895	5.25	▼5.77
Turnout		152,174	53.72	▲3.85
Total valid votes		150,281		
Registered electors		283,296		
BJP hold		Swing	▲5.54	

=== Assembly Election 2019 ===
2019 Maharashtra Legislative Assembly election : Sion Koliwada
Party	Candidate	Votes	%	±%
BJP	Captain R Tamil Selvan	54,845	43.32	▲12.49
INC	Ganesh Kumar Yadav	40,894	32.30	▲14.87
MNS	Anant Laxman Kamble	13,684	10.81	▲8.27
VBA	Amiruddin Alqamar Nizamuddin (Aamir Edresy)	11,556	9.13	New
NOTA	None of the Above	3,259	2.57	▲1.48
BSP	Vilas Dhondu Kamble	1,724	1.36	New
CPI	Com. Vijay Ashok Dalvi	1,696	1.34	New
Bahujan Maha Party	Adv. Shanta Nair	986	0.78	New
Margin of victory		13,951	11.02	▲8.20
Turnout		129,883		▼2.95
Total valid votes		126,592		
Registered electors		257,293		
BJP hold		Swing	▲12.49	

=== Assembly Election 2014 ===
2014 Maharashtra Legislative Assembly election : Sion Koliwada
Party	Candidate	Votes	%	±%
BJP	Captain R Tamil Selvan	40,869	30.83	▲7.17
SS	Mangesh Satamkar	37,131	28.01	New
INC	Shetty Jagannath Achanna	23,107	17.43	▼21.68
NCP	PRASAD MINESH LAD	11,769	8.88	New
Independent	Sansare Manoj	6,716	5.07	New
AIMIM	Mohammad Raza Shaikh	5,896	4.45	New
MNS	Baba Kadam	3,370	2.54	▼15.31
NOTA	None of the Above	1,457	1.10	New
Margin of victory		3,738	2.82	▼12.63
Turnout		134,022		▲11.96
Total valid votes		132,548		
Registered electors		254,163		
BJP gain from INC		Swing	▼8.28	

=== Assembly Election 2009 ===
2009 Maharashtra Legislative Assembly election : Sion Koliwada
Party	Candidate	Votes	%	±%
INC	Shetty Jagannath Achanna	45,638	39.11	New
BJP	Dr. Manisha Kayande	27,615	23.67	New
MNS	Vinod Shantaram Khopkar	20,827	17.85	New
RPI(A)	Manoj Martandrao Sansare	15,661	13.42	New
BSP	Adv. Ganesh Ayyer	3,030	2.60	New
Independent	Adv. Shakil Ahmed	1,211	1.04	New
AIADMK	S. Ramanathan Thevar	1,005	0.86	New
Margin of victory		18,023	15.45	
Turnout		116,687	40.19	
Total valid votes		116,687		
Registered electors		290,317		
INC win (new seat)				
