= Great strike =

Great strike or great strikes may refer to:

== Asia ==
- The Great Bombay textile strike, a 1982 strike of textile workers

== Australia and Pacific Islands ==
- The 1913 Great Strike, a general strike in New Zealand
- The Australian general strike, 1917, also simply the Great Strike

== Europe ==
- The London dock strike of 1889, also the Great Dock Strike, involving dock workers in the Port of London

== North America ==
- The Great Railroad Strike of 1877, or the Great Upheaval
- The Great Railroad Strike of 1922, or the Railway Shopmen's Strike
- The Great Southwest railroad strike of 1886, an 1886 strike against the Union Pacific and Missouri Pacific railroads
- The Flint sit-down strike, also the great GM sit down strike, a 1936–1937 strike against General Motors
- The Strike wave of 1945–46, also the great strike wave of 1946, the largest strikes in American labor history

== See also ==
- List of strikes
