= Dharavi Assembly constituency =

Constituency of the Maharashtra legislative assembly in India

Coordinates: 19.04°N 72.86°E

Dharavi
- Constituency No. 178 for the Maharashtra Legislative Assembly

Constituency details
- Country: India
- Region: Western India
- State: Maharashtra
- District: Mumbai City
- Lok Sabha constituency: Mumbai South Central
- Established: 1978
- Total electors: 261,892
- Reservation: SC

Member of Legislative Assembly
- 15th Maharashtra Legislative Assembly
- Incumbent Jyoti Gaikwad
- Party: INC
- Alliance: MVA
- Elected year: 2024

Dharavi Assembly constituency is one of the 288 constituencies of Maharashtra Vidhan Sabha located in the Mumbai City district.

== Overview ==
Dharavi (constituency number 178) is one of the 10 Vidhan Sabha constituencies located in the Mumbai City district. Number of electorates in 2009 was 268,779 (male 152,013, female 116,766) 113,732 are voters from minority community.

It is a part of the Mumbai South Central (Lok Sabha constituency) along with five other assembly constituencies, viz Sion Koliwada, Wadala, Mahim, from Mumbai City district and Chembur and Anushakti Nagar from Mumbai Suburban district.

== Members of the Legislative Assembly ==
Year	Member	Party
1978	Satyendra More	Communist Party of India
1980	Premanand Awale	Indian National Congress (I)
1985	Eknath Gaikwad	Indian National Congress
1990	Eknath Gaikwad	Indian National Congress
1995	Baburao Mane	Shiv Sena
1999	Eknath Gaikwad	Indian National Congress
2004	Varsha Gaikwad	Indian National Congress
2009	Varsha Gaikwad	Indian National Congress
2014	Varsha Gaikwad	Indian National Congress
2019	Varsha Gaikwad	Indian National Congress
2024	Jyoti Gaikwad	Indian National Congress

== Election results ==
=== Assembly Election 2024 ===
2024 Maharashtra Legislative Assembly election : Dharavi
Party	Candidate	Votes	%	±%
INC	Dr. Jyoti Gaikwad	70,727	54.60%	▲8.56
SS	Rajesh Shivdas Khandare	47,268	36.49%	▲0.54
BSP	Manohar Kedari Raibage	6,196	4.78%	▲3.19
Independent	Ghazi Saaduddin	3,331	2.57%	New
NOTA	None of the Above	1,756	1.36%	▼0.24
Margin of victory		23,459	18.11%	▲8.02
Turnout		131,304	50.14%	▲2.63
Total valid votes		129,548		
Registered electors		261,892		▲4.65
INC hold		Swing	▲8.56	

=== Assembly Election 2019 ===
2019 Maharashtra Legislative Assembly election : Dharavi
Party	Candidate	Votes	%	±%
INC	Varsha Eknath Gaikwad	53,954	46.03%	▲5.15
SS	Ashish Vasant More	42,130	35.94%	▲8.20
AIMIM	Manoj Sansare	13,099	11.18%	New
MNS	Kawade Sandeep Vinayak	4,062	3.47%	▲0.79
BSP	Anita Deepak Gautam	1,870	1.60%	▼1.10
NOTA	None of the Above	1,869	1.59%	▲0.36
Margin of victory		11,824	10.09%	▼3.04
Turnout		119,092	47.59%	▼1.99
Total valid votes		117,208		
Registered electors		250,251		▲4.68
INC hold		Swing	▲5.15	

=== Assembly Election 2014 ===
2014 Maharashtra Legislative Assembly election : Dharavi
Party	Candidate	Votes	%	±%
INC	Varsha Eknath Gaikwad	47,718	40.88%	▼8.87
SS	Baburao Mane	32,390	27.75%	▼12.80
BJP	Divya Dholay	20,763	17.79%	New
Independent	Hanumantha S Nandepalli	5,333	4.57%	New
BSP	Adv. Sandeep Dattu Katke	3,143	2.69%	▼4.20
MNS	Ganesh Chandrakant Khade	3,120	2.67%	New
Independent	Dilip Nagesh Katke	2,199	1.88%	New
NOTA	None of the Above	1,436	1.23%	New
Margin of victory		15,328	13.13%	▲3.93
Turnout		118,160	49.42%	▲9.56
Total valid votes		116,724		
Registered electors		239,073		▼11.05
INC hold		Swing	▼8.87	

=== Assembly Election 2009 ===
2009 Maharashtra Legislative Assembly election : Dharavi
Party	Candidate	Votes	%	±%
INC	Varsha Eknath Gaikwad	52,492	49.75%	▼3.03
SS	Raibage Manohar Kedari	42,783	40.55%	▲0.63
BSP	Vishnu Ramchandra Gaikwad	7,269	6.89%	▲2.52
Independent	Daulatram Bhujingrao Kawle	1,720	1.63%	New
Independent	Lokhande Shanu Janardan	645	0.61%	New
Margin of victory		9,709	9.20%	▼3.66
Turnout		105,523	39.26%	▼0.82
Total valid votes		105,516		
Registered electors		268,770		▼12.50
INC hold		Swing	▼3.03	

=== Assembly Election 2004 ===
2004 Maharashtra Legislative Assembly election : Dharavi
Party	Candidate	Votes	%	±%
INC	Varsha Eknath Gaikwad	64,981	52.78%	▲5.85
SS	Jadhav Snehal Sudhir	49,151	39.92%	▲1.47
INC	Baba Jiyauddin Siddiki	44,517	36.16%	▼10.77
BJP	Shaina Nana Chudasama Alias Shaina N.C	25,877	21.02%	New
Independent	Edwin Brito	5,482	4.45%	New
BSP	Doulatram Bhujingrao Kawle	5,378	4.37%	▲1.85
BSP	Singh Chandrashekhar ( Mannubhai)	1,945	1.58%	▼0.94
Margin of victory		15,830	12.86%	▲4.38
Turnout		123,124	40.08%	▼1.02
Total valid votes		123,122		
Registered electors		307,177		▲13.76
INC hold		Swing	▲5.85	

=== Assembly Election 1999 ===
1999 Maharashtra Legislative Assembly election : Dharavi
Party	Candidate	Votes	%	±%
INC	Eknath Gaikwad	52,087	46.93%	▲16.41
SS	Baburao Mane	42,673	38.45%	▼11.11
Independent	M. Y. Shinde	10,372	9.35%	New
BSP	Chandrakant Atamaram Yadav	2,800	2.52%	▼6.27
Independent	Shashikant Lumaji Bhalerao	2,034	1.83%	New
National Minorities Party	Jagannath Bhimrao Vhatkar	1,022	0.92%	New
Margin of victory		9,414	8.48%	▼10.56
Turnout		110,990	41.10%	▼11.38
Total valid votes		110,988		
Registered electors		270,033		▲8.71
INC gain from SS		Swing	▼2.63	

=== Assembly Election 1995 ===
1995 Maharashtra Legislative Assembly election : Dharavi
Party	Candidate	Votes	%	±%
SS	Baburao Jotiram Mane	64,607	49.56%	New
INC	Dr. Boudhankar Rajeev Narendra	39,787	30.52%	▼10.81
BSP	Dhakoliya Vijender Surtaram	11,460	8.79%	▲7.80
JD	Kawle Doulatram Bhujangrao	7,100	5.45%	New
Independent	Vhatkar Jagannath Bhimrao	3,868	2.97%	New
JP	Trimbake Machindranath Mahadeo	1,531	1.17%	New
Margin of victory		24,820	19.04%	▲12.65
Turnout		133,009	53.55%	▲4.52
Total valid votes		130,358		
Registered electors		248,403		▲5.56
SS gain from INC		Swing	▲8.23	

=== Assembly Election 1990 ===
1990 Maharashtra Legislative Assembly election : Dharavi
Party	Candidate	Votes	%	±%
INC	Eknath Gaikwad	46,643	41.33%	▼7.99
BJP	Ramesh Medhekar	39,430	34.94%	New
CPI(M)	Satyendra More	13,614	12.06%	▲5.81
Independent	Vasant More	10,597	9.39%	New
BSP	Balvant Kakade	1,115	0.99%	New
Margin of victory		7,213	6.39%	▼10.10
Turnout		114,411	48.62%	▲5.85
Total valid votes		112,859		
Registered electors		235,310		▲34.27
INC hold		Swing	▼7.99	

=== Assembly Election 1985 ===
1985 Maharashtra Legislative Assembly election : Dharavi
Party	Candidate	Votes	%	±%
INC	Eknath Gaikwad	36,396	49.32%	New
IC(S)	Vasant More	24,223	32.82%	New
CPI(M)	Satyendra More	4,612	6.25%	▼15.55
Independent	Narayan Genu Kadam	4,541	6.15%	New
Independent	Nanasaheb Waghmare	3,828	5.19%	New
Margin of victory		12,173	16.49%	▼14.72
Turnout		75,056	42.83%	▲9.24
Total valid votes		73,802		
Registered electors		175,252		▲9.17
INC gain from INC(I)		Swing	▼3.69	

=== Assembly Election 1980 ===
1980 Maharashtra Legislative Assembly election : Dharavi
Party	Candidate	Votes	%	±%
INC(I)	Premanand Awale	27,971	53.01%	New
CPI(M)	Satyendra More	11,501	21.80%	▼27.70
BJP	Dattaji Shinde	11,194	21.21%	New
Independent	Yeshwant Gopal Thorat	532	1.01%	New
Independent	Shakuntala Chintaman Salve	460	0.87%	New
Independent	Prakash Ambaji Kamble	330	0.63%	New
Margin of victory		16,470	31.21%	▲3.28
Turnout		53,535	33.35%	▼20.28
Total valid votes		52,767		
Registered electors		160,532		▲16.81
INC(I) gain from CPI(M)		Swing	▲3.51	

=== Assembly Election 1978 ===
1978 Maharashtra Legislative Assembly election : Dharavi
Party	Candidate	Votes	%	±%
CPI(M)	Satyendra More	36,156	49.50%	New
INC	Gaikwad Vishnu Babaji	15,754	21.57%	New
Independent	Bharat Namdeo More	11,093	15.19%	New
SS	Sadaphule Sudam Krishna	5,543	7.59%	New
Independent	Ashayya Buchayya Badhya	4,499	6.16%	New
Margin of victory		20,402	27.93%	
Turnout		74,769	54.40%	
Total valid votes		73,045		
Registered electors		137,434		
CPI(M) win (new seat)				
