= Mohan Rawale =

Indian politician (1948–2020)

Member of Parliament
- In office (1991-1996), (1996-1998), (1998-1999), (1999-2004), (2004 – 2009)
- Preceded by: Wamanrao Mahadik
- Succeeded by: Eknath Gaikwad
- Constituency: Mumbai South Central

Personal details
- Born: 9 December 1948 Mumbai, Maharashtra
- Died: 19 December 2020 (aged 72) Goa, India
- Party: Shiv Sena
- Spouse: Indira Mohan Rawale
- Children: 1 son and 1 daughter

Mohan Rawale (9 December 1948 – 19 December 2020) was a member of the 14th Lok Sabha of India. He represented the Mumbai South Central constituency of Maharashtra and was a member of the Shiv Sena (SS) political party before Shiv Sena party leader Uddhav Thackeray expelled him from the party in an apparent clamp down on dissidence. He joined the Nationalist Congress Party but soon after rejoined the Shiv Sena.

He was born in Parel, Mumbai. He got married on 21 December 1986 to Indira Mohan Rawale and had a son and a daughter.

== Positions held ==
- 1979–1984 – President, Bharatiya Vidyarthi Sena (BVS), Maharashtra now it’s Yuva Sena a youth wing of Shiv Sena
- 1991 – Elected to 10th Lok Sabha
- 1996 – Elected to 11th Lok Sabha
- 1998 – Elected to 12th Lok Sabha
- 1999 – Elected to 13th Lok Sabha
- 2004 – Elected to 14th Lok Sabha
- 2009 – Lost from Mumbai South

Lok Sabha
Preceded by Wamanrao Mahadik	Member of Parliament for Mumbai South Central; 1991–2009	Succeeded by Eknath Gaikwad
