= Varsha Gaikwad =

Indian politician from Maharashtra

Varsha Eknath Gaikwad
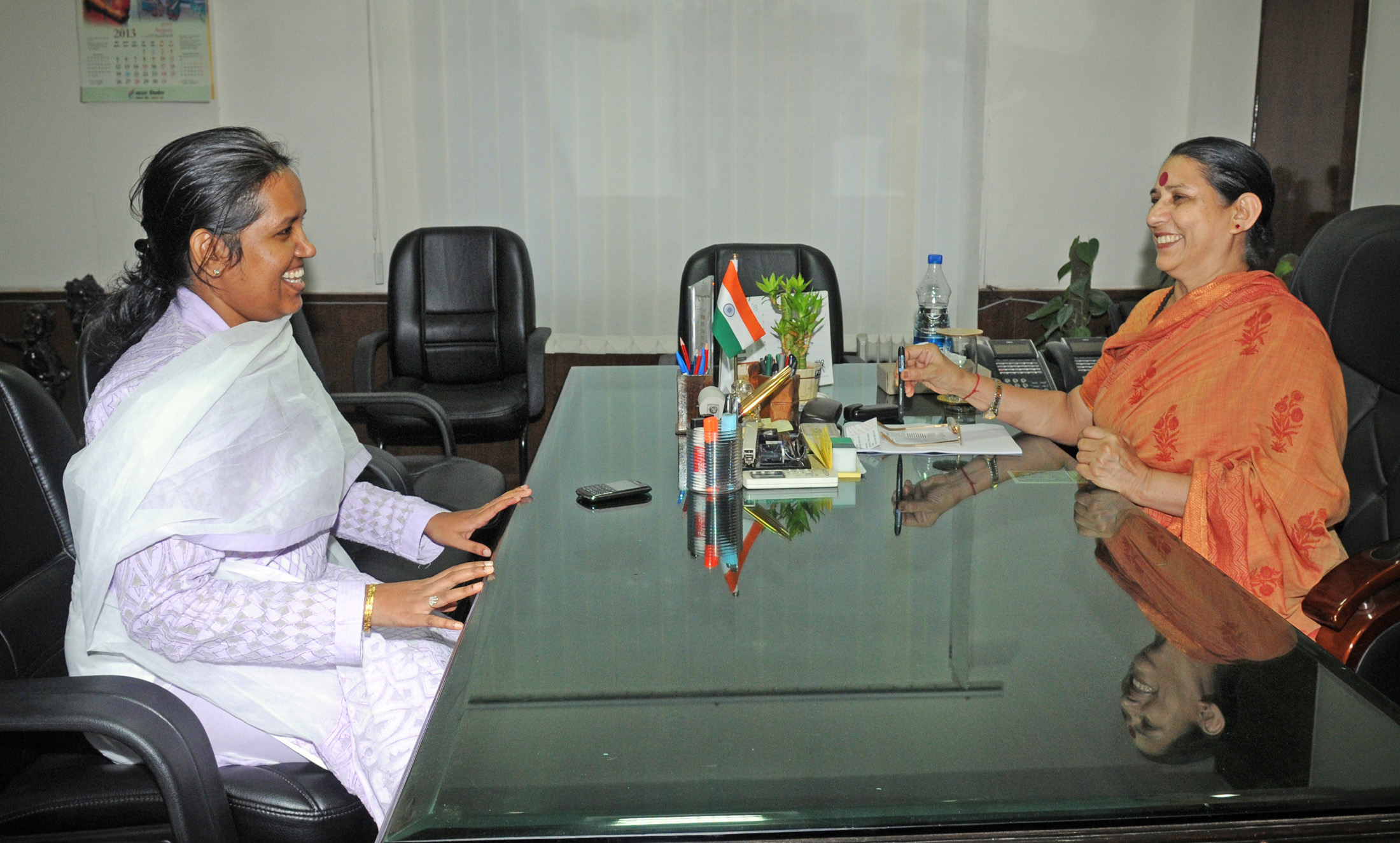
- Varsha Gaikwad (L) and Krishna Tirath (R) in New Delhi

Member of Parliament, Lok Sabha
- Incumbent
- Assumed office 24 June 2024
- Preceded by: Poonam Mahajan
- Constituency: Mumbai North Central

President of Mumbai Regional Congress Committee
- Incumbent
- Assumed office 9 June 2023
- National President Congress: Mallikarjun Kharge
- Preceded by: Bhai Jagtap

Minister of School Education Government of Maharashtra
- In office 30 December 2019 – 29 June 2022
- Governor: Bhagat Singh Koshyari
- Chief Minister: Uddhav Thackeray
- Dy Chief Minister: Ajit Pawar
- Guardian Ministers: Hingoli District
- Preceded by: Balasaheb Thorat; Dilip Kamble (Guardian Ministers Hingoli)
- Succeeded by: Eknath Shinde; Abdul Sattar (Guardian Ministers Hingoli)

Minister of Woman and Child Development Government of Maharashtra
- In office 11 November 2010 – 26 September 2014
- Governor: K. Sankaranarayanan; Om Prakash Kohli (additional charge); C. Vidyasagar Rao
- Chief Minister: Prithviraj Chavan
- Dy Chief Minister: Ajit Pawar
- Guardian Ministers: Washim District; Thane District
- Preceded by: Subhash Zanak; Radhakrishna Vikhe Patil (Guardian Ministers Washim); Ganesh Naik (Guardian Ministers Thane)
- Succeeded by: Pankaja Munde; Eknath Khadse (Guardian Ministers Washim); Eknath Shinde (Guardian Ministers Thane)

Member of Maharashtra Legislative Assembly
- In office 2004 – 18 June 2024
- Preceded by: Eknath Gaikwad
- Succeeded by: Jyoti Gaikwad
- Constituency: Dharavi

Minister of State Government of Maharashtra
- In office 07 November 2009 – 10 November 2010
- Minister: Medical Education; Higher and Technical Education; Tourism; Special Assistance
- Governor: S. C. Jamir; K. Sankaranarayanan
- Chief Minister: Ashok Chavan
- Dy Chief Minister: Chhagan Bhujbal
- Guardian Ministers: Hingoli District

Personal details
- Born: 3 February 1975 (age 51) Mumbai, Maharashtra, India
- Party: Indian National Congress
- Parent: Eknath Gaikwad (father)
- Education: M.Sc (Maths), B.Ed
- Occupation: Politician
- Profession: Professor

Varsha Eknath Gaikwad (born 3 February 1975) is an Indian politician serving as a Member of Parliament, Lok Sabha. She is the President of the Mumbai Regional Congress Committee. Earlier, she was a four term Member of the Maharashtra Legislative Assembly (MLA) represented the Dharavi Assembly constituency in Mumbai (2004-2024). She served as the Cabinet Minister of Maharashtra from 30 December 2019 to 29 June 2022.

Gaikwad won the Mumbai North Central Lok Sabha constituency in the 2024 Lok Sabha election. She defeated BJP candidate Adv. Ujjwal Nikam. She is one of the three Buddhist MPs in the 18th Lok Sabha.

Gaikwad was one of the key protestors during the 2026 Budget Session proceedings of the Lok Sabha, where Opposition members entered the vale of the House and displayed placards and surrounded the front benches, including the Prime Minister’s seat, resulting in a adjournment.

== Positions held ==
- 2004 – 2009: Member of Maharashtra Legislative Assembly (1st term)
- 2009 – 2014: Member of Maharashtra Legislative Assembly (2nd term)
  - 2009 - 2010: State Minister for Medical Education, Higher and Technical Education, Tourism, Special Assistance
  - 2010 – 2014: Cabinet Minister for Women and Child Development, Government of Maharashtra
- 2014 – 2019: Member of Maharashtra Legislative Assembly (3rd term)
- 2019 – 2024: Member of Maharashtra Legislative Assembly (4th term)
  - Cabinet Minister for School Education Department, Government of Maharashtra
- 2024 – current: Member of Parliament, Lok Sabha

== Personal life ==
Varsha Gaikwad's father is Eknath Gaikwad, who was a three term Member of parliament. She belongs to an Ambedkarite Buddhist family. She was lecturer in Siddharth College of Arts, Science and Commerce, Mumbai.
