= Population Control Bill, 2019 =

Proposed population control bill, India

The Population Control Bill, 2019 (or, Population Regulation Bill, 2019) is a proposed bill introduced in the Rajya Sabha in July 2019 by Rakesh Sinha. The purpose of the bill is to control the population growth of India. According to the World Population Prospects 2019 report by the United Nations, the population of India was set to overtake that of China within a decade, which has occurred. The proposed bill was signed by 125 Members of Parliament (MP) and is yet to become an act of law.

== Summary ==
On 7 February 2020, the Constitution (Amendment) Bill, 2020 was introduced in the Rajya Sabha by Anil Desai, a Shiv Sena MP. Desai proposed to amend the Article 47A of the Constitution of India to state -

The State shall promote small family norms by offering incentives in taxes, employment, education etc. to its people who keep their family limited to two children and shall withdraw every concession from and deprive such incentives to those not adhering to small family norm, to keep the growing population under control.

The 2020 bill proposes to introduce a two-child policy per couple and aims to incentivize its adoption through various measures such as educational benefits, taxation cuts, home loans, free healthcare, and better employment opportunities. The 2019 bill proposed by Sinha talks about introducing penalties for couples not adhering to the two-child policy such as debarment from contesting in elections and ineligibility for government jobs.

In July 2022, it was reported that BJP MP Ravi Kishan was going to introduce private members' bill on Population control. In the same month Giriraj Singh supported calls for Population control laws.

== Reception ==
Columnist Shivanshu K. Srivastava wrote "It is urgently required that our lawmakers pass the Population Control Bill under which an upper limit to the number of children a couple can have is specified. Couples exceeding this limit must be penalised."

== See also ==
- Population control
- Human overpopulation
- Two-child policy
