= Krishna Desai =

Indian politician (1877–1970)

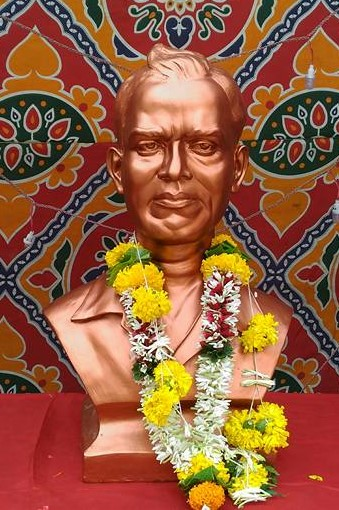
- Statue of Krishna Desai at Tavari Pavda Lalbaug, Mumbai, where he was killed

Member of Maharashtra Legislative Assembly
- In office 21 February 1967 – 5 June 1970
- Preceded by: Madhavrao Mani
- Succeeded by: Wamanrao Mahadik
- Constituency: Parel

Personal details
- Born: 13 October 1877 Bulasr, Bombay Presidency, British India (modern day Gujarat, India)
- Died: 5 June 1970 (aged 92) Lalbaug, Mumbai, Maharashtra, India
- Cause of death: Assassination by stabbing
- Party: Communist Party of India

Krishna Desai (13 October 1877 - 5 June 1970) was an Indian politician. He served as a member of the Maharashtra Legislative Assembly representing the Communist Party of India from 1967 until his assassination in 1970.

== Life ==
He was a Member of Legislative Assembly of Maharashtra, who represented the working-class Mumbai Parel Assembly constituency then a communist stronghold. Desai was murdered in 1970, and this was preceded by the burning of the office of the CPI-led Girni Kamgar Union. Hansen considers his murder to be the culmination of the Shiv Sena campaign against the communists. His murder was a sign of a Sena victory in its struggle for the domination of unions and politics in Mumbai's working class district.

== Death ==
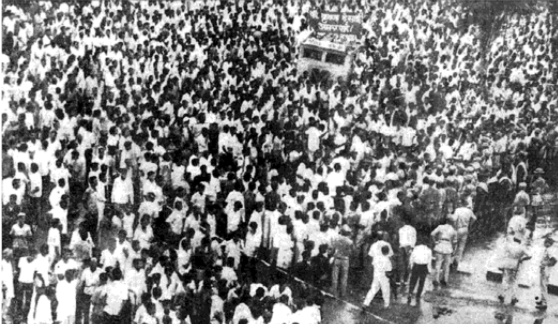
Funeral Procession for Krishna Desai. June 14, 1970

Desai was stabbed to death on 5 June 1970. He was a sitting MLA when he was murdered. Seven suspects were arrested on 8 June 1970. Nineteen people were charged and sixteen were convicted for the murder. The accused were defended by Ram Jethmalani. Bal Thackeray's complicity in the murder was never proven. Prakash writes that those convicted were members of the Shiv Sena. According to Dipankar Gupta, the Shiv Sena chief Bal Thackeray congratulated those who killed Desai, declaring, "we must not miss a single opportunity to massacre communists wherever we find them."

== Aftermath ==
In the special by-election held in October 1970, his wife Sarojini Desai was nominated by the CPI, but she was defeated by the Shiv Sena candidate Wamanrao Mahadik by a narrow margin of 1679 votes (of the nearly 62000 votes cast).

According to the communists, the then Indian National Congress government had an interest in weakening and driving out the communists, and so it "supported the incident".

== See also ==
- List of assassinated Indian politicians
