= Sanjay Nirupam =

Indian politician

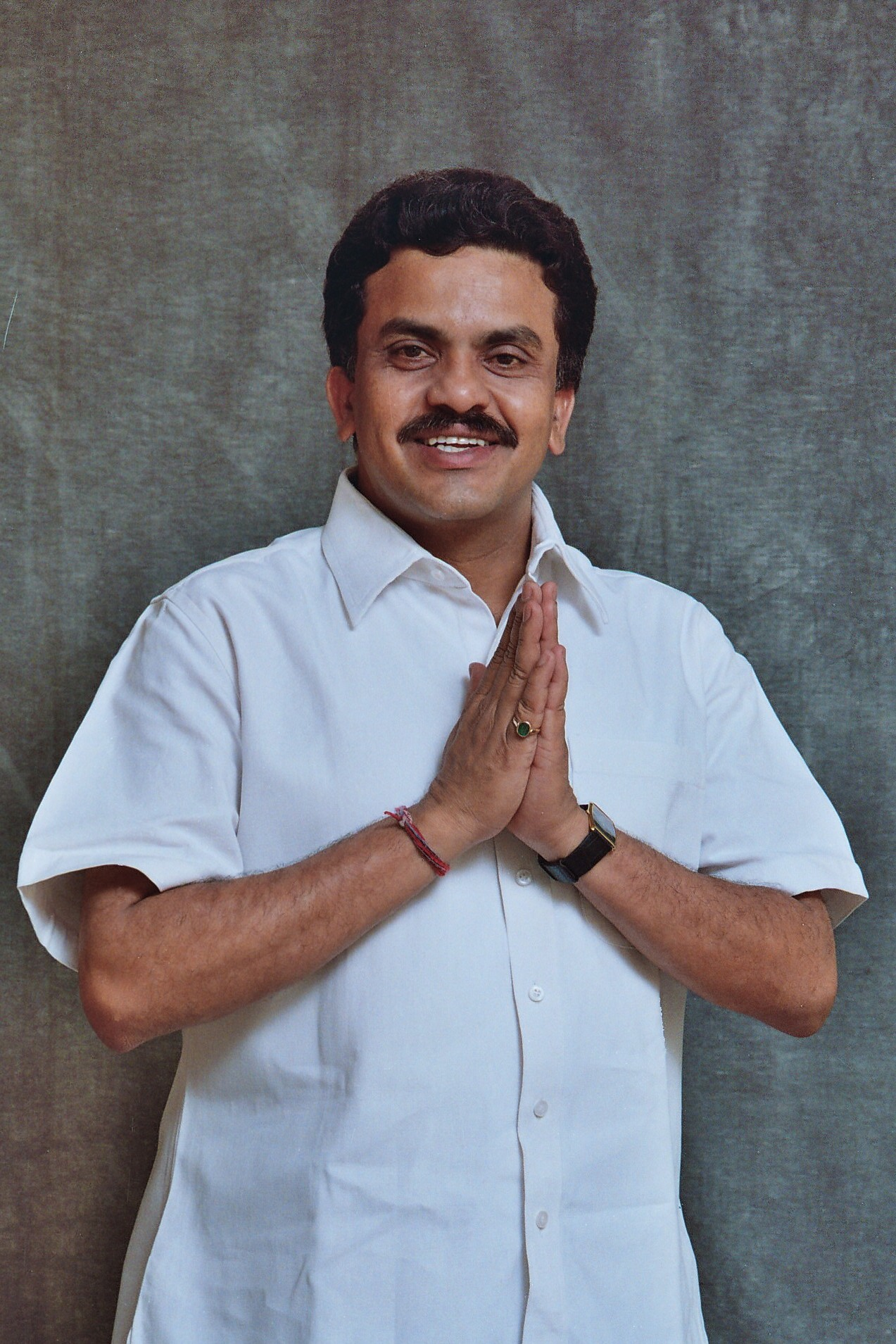

Member of Parliament, Lok Sabha
- In office 2009-2014
- Preceded by: Govinda Ahuja
- Succeeded by: Gopal Shetty
- Constituency: Mumbai North

Member of Parliament, Rajya Sabha
- In office 1996-2005
- Preceded by: Suresh Kalmadi
- Succeeded by: Vasant Chavan
- Constituency: Maharashtra

President of Mumbai Regional Congress Committee
- In office 15 January 2015 - 25 March 2019

Personal details
- Born: 6 February 1965 (age 61) Rohtas, Bihar, India
- Party: Shiv Sena (1993-2005), (2024-present)
- Other political affiliations: Indian National Congress (2005-2024)
- Education: A N College, Patna
- Website: sanjaynirupam.com

Sanjay Nirupam (born 6 February 1965) is a Shiv Sena politician. He is a former member of the Indian Parliament from Indian National Congress party, and former President of the Mumbai Regional Congress Committee. Nirupam served two terms as an MP in the Rajya Sabha first as a member of the Shiv Sena and then as a member of the Congress Party. He also represented North Mumbai Lok Sabha constituency from 2009 to 2014.

== Career ==
Nirupam began his journalism career in 1986. In 1993, he became the chief editor of Saamana, which was owned at the time by the founder of Shiv Sena, Bal Thackeray. He then became an MP for Shiv Sena in 1996.

He was a member of Parliamentary Committees such as the Public Accounts Committee (PAC) and Finance Committee. He opened the 2013–14 budget debate for the Congress party in the Parliament. He was Secretary of the AICC and was also Secretary-in-Charge of the state of Bihar. He was one of the national spokespersons of the Congress party to express the party's view on different issues on various TV Channels. Sanjay Nirupam lost to BJP candidate Gopal Shetty in the 2014 Lok Sabha elections. He was appointed President of Mumbai Regional Congress Committee in 2015. He was a contestant on Bigg Boss in 2008.

== Political career ==
After another poor showing at the polls, this time in the BMC elections in 2017, Nirupam tendered his resignation as the head of the Congress Party for Mumbai.

On 4 April 2024, he was suspended for 6 years by the Indian National Congress for Party Indiscipline. Later the same day, he resigned from Indian National Congress.
