= Rashtriya Mill Mazdoor Sangh =

Indian textile trade union

The Rashtriya Mill Mazdoor Sangh is a trade union for textile mills in Mumbai, India.

Until the fiery Dutta Samant came on the scene ahead of the Great Bombay textile strike, Rashtriya Mill Mazdoor Sangh had been the officially recognised union of the textile workers in Bombay. It is affiliated with Indian National Trade Union Congress.
