= Mahesh Sawant =

Indian politician

Mahesh Baliram Sawant (born 1972) is an Indian politician from Maharashtra. He is an MLA from Mahim Assembly constituency in Mumbai City District. He won the 2024 Maharashtra Legislative Assembly election representing the Shiv Sena (UBT).

== Early life and education ==
Sawant is from Mahim, Mumbai City District, Maharashtra. He is the son of Baliram Shankar Sawant, a mill worker. He completed his B.Com. in 1992 at RM Bhatt College, Parel, Mumbai, which is affiliated with Mumbai University. He runs his own business along with his wife. He is a Shiv Sainik who contested elections for the first time.

== Career ==
Sawant won from Mahim Assembly constituency representing Shiv Sena (UBT) in the 2024 Maharashtra Legislative Assembly election. He polled 50,313 votes and defeated his nearest rival, Sada Sarvankar of the Shiv Sena, by a margin of 1,316 votes. Sarvankar of Shiv Sena, the sitting MLA, came second while Amit Thackeray, the son of Maharashtra Navnirman Sena president Raj Thackeray, making his electoral debut could only finish third. Thus, he is credited with bagging Thackeray's legacy seat.
