= Jayashri Raiji =

Indian independence activist (1895–1985)

Jayashri Naishadh Raiji

Member of Parliament, 1st Lok Sabha
- In office 1952–1957
- President: Rajendra Prasad
- Prime Minister: Jawaharlal Nehru
- Vice President: Sarvepalli Radhakrishnan
- Preceded by: Position established
- Constituency: Bombay Suburban

Personal details
- Born: October 26, 1895 Surat, Bombay Presidency, British India
- Died: 1985 (aged 89–90)
- Spouse: N. M. Raiji (m. 1918)
- Children: 4
- Parent: Manubhai Mehta (father)
- Education: Baroda College
- Occupation: Independence activist; social worker; politician
- Known for: Non-cooperation movement and Quit India Movement participation
- Awards: Jamnalal Bajaj Award (1980)

Jayashri Naishadh Raiji (1895–1985) was an Indian independence activist, social worker, reformist and politician. She was a member of the 1st Lok Sabha from Bombay Suburban seat.

== Early life ==
Jayashri was born on 26 October 1895 to Sir Manubhai Mehta in Surat and for her higher studies attended the Baroda College.

== Career ==
Known for her social work, Raiji became the chairperson of Bombay Presidency Women's Council in 1919. During the Non-cooperation movement (1930), she participated in the picketing of shops selling foreign goods and was imprisoned by British authorities for six months during the Quit India Movement (1942).To encourage the adoption of swadeshi goods, she helped organise exhibitions and set up women's co-operative stores.

After India gained independence, she contest the first general elections from Bombay Suburban constituency and became a member of the 1st Lok Sabha. She was one of founding members of the Indian Council for Child Welfare. In 1980, she was awarded the Jamnalal Bajaj Award for Development and Welfare of Women And Children.

== Personal life ==
She was married to N. M. Raiji in 1918 and had four children from him. She died in 1985.
