= Rahul Shewale =

Indian politician

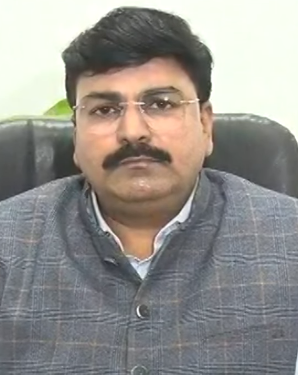

Member of Parliament, Lok Sabha
- In office 16 May 2014 – 3 June 2024
- Preceded by: Eknath Gaikwad
- Succeeded by: Anil Yashwant Desai
- Constituency: Mumbai South Central

Personal details
- Born: 14 April 1973 (age 53)
- Party: Shiv Sena
- Website: rahulshewale.in

Rahul Ramesh Shewale (born 14 April 1973) is an Indian politician from the Shiv Sena and served as the Lok Sabha member from the Mumbai South Central constituency.

Shewale is a four-time chairman of the standing committee of the Brihanmumbai Municipal Corporation (BMC), the municipal corporation of the city of Mumbai. He held the position from 2010 to 2014. His nomination for a fifth time was replaced by Yashodhar Phanse after he was declared a candidate for the Lok Sabha. He, along with his predecessor Ravindra Waikar, hold the record for being appointed the chairman of the BMC standing committee the most times.

== Personal life ==
Rahul Shewale was born on 14 April 1973 to Ramesh Sambhaji Shewale, an Indian Navy officer and Jayashri Shewale, an employee of MTNL. His elder brother Avinash is a software engineer, who has settled in the United States, while his brother Navin is a doctor. He married fellow Shiv Sena politician and BMC corporator Kamini Mayekar (Kamini Shewale) on 14 February 2005. Kamini Shewale is a housewife. The couple have two sons: Swayam and Vedant.

Shewale is a Diploma holder in Civil Engineering from Government Polytechnic, Bandra.

== Political career ==
Besides a four-time chairman of the standing committee of the BMC, Shewale has also headed the Market and Garden Committee and the Ward Committee and was also a member of the Law Committee.

He was SS candidate from Trombay assembly seat in 2004 vidhansabha elections but lost to congress candidate.

Shewale, then a BMC corporator from Anushakti Nagar was nominated by his party as the National Democratic Alliance (NDA) candidate from Mumbai South Central constituency in the 2014 Indian general election. Shewale, a Dalit leader was fielded against the sitting 2-time MP and Dalit leader Eknath Gaikwad of the Congress party, which was part of the United Progressive Alliance (UPA). Shewale got 3.8 lakh votes and won by a margin of 1.38 lakh over his nearest rival Gaikwad.

After the split in Shiv Sena, Rahul Shewale left Uddhav Thackeray and went with Eknath Shinde.

- 2002: Elected as corporator in BMC
- 2007: Elected as corporator in Brihanmumbai Municipal Corporation
- 2012: Re-elected as corporator in Brihanmumbai Municipal Corporation
- 2012-2014: Standing Committee Chairman Brihanmumbai Municipal Corporation
- 2014 : Elected to 16th Lok Sabha
- 2019 : Elected to 17th Lok Sabha
- 2022 a
