= Maharashtra General Kamgar Union =

Trade union in India

MGKU
- Maharashtra General Kamgar Union
- Founded: Dutta Samant
- Headquarters: Maharashtra
- Location: India
- Key people: Dutta Samant (21 November 1932 – 16 January 1997) Dada Samant (1929-22 May 2020) Bhushan Dutta Samant (Present Leader)

Maharashtra General Kamgar Union is a trade union federation in Maharashtra, India. MGKU is formed by the well known Dutta Samant. After his assassination the union was then led by his elder brother Dada Samant. He handled the trade union for a few years but lacked leadership qualities so eventually he left leadership to the Union. The Union is now led by Bhushan Dutta Samant.
