= Mangesh Satamkar =

Indian politician

Education Committee Chairman, Brihanmumbai Municipal Corporation
- Incumbent
- Assumed office April 2018

Personal details
- Party: Shiv Sena
- Occupation: Politician

Mangesh Satamkar is an Indian politician and Shiv Sena leader from Mumbai, Maharashtra. He is the Education Committee Chairman in Brihanmumbai Municipal Corporation. He had worked on several committees in the municipal corporation such as Standing committee, Education Committee etc. He had unsuccessfully contested Sion Koliwada Assembly election in 2014.

== Positions held ==
- 1994: Elected as corporator in Brihanmumbai Municipal Corporation
- 2002: Re-elected as corporator in Brihanmumbai Municipal Corporation
- 2004, 2006, 2007: Education Committee Chairman Brihanmumbai Municipal Corporation
- 2007: Re-elected as corporator in Brihanmumbai Municipal Corporation
- 2017: Re-elected as corporator in Brihanmumbai Municipal Corporation
- 2018: Elected as Education Committee Chairman Brihanmumbai Municipal Corporation
