= Vasant Chavan =

Indian politician

Member of Parliament, Rajya Sabha
- In office 25 April 2005 – 11 July 2006
- Preceded by: Sanjay Nirupam
- Succeeded by: Supriya Sule
- Constituency: Maharashtra

Personal details
- Born: 15 October 1942 Pune, Maharashtra, India
- Died: 11 July 2006 (aged 63)
- Party: NCP

Vasant Chavan (born 1942) was a member of Rajya Sabha from Maharashtra state during the terms 25 April 2005 to 2 April 2006 as Nationalist Congress Party candidate, in bye-elections unopposed after the resignation of then Shiv Sena Rajya Sabha member Sanjay Nirupam. He was elected for second term from 03/04/2006 to 02/04/2012.

He had member of Maharashtra Legislative Council for 3 terms until 2004. Chavan had a large following among the Mehtar Valmiki community and his brilliant academic record had earned him many admirers, including the political leader like Sharad Pawar.
