= R. R. Bhole =

Indian politician

Member of Parliament, Lok Sabha
- In office 1980-1984
- Preceded by: B. C. Kamble
- Succeeded by: Datta Samant
- Constituency: Mumbai South Central

Personal details
- Born: 11 February 1913
- Party: Indian National Congress
- Spouse: Ambika Bhole

Rajaram Ramji Bhole was an Indian politician, elected to the Lok Sabha, the lower house of the Parliament of India as a member of the Indian National Congress.
