= Mumbai Regional Congress Committee =

- President: Varsha Gaikwad
- Youth wing: Mumbai Youth Congress
- Women's wing: Mumbai Regional Mahila Congress Committee
- Ideology: Neoliberalism; Social liberalism; Economic liberalism; Social democracy; Secularism
- Alliance: Indian National Developmental Inclusive Alliance
- Seats in Brihanmumbai Municipal Corporation: 24 / 227

Election symbol

Website
- mumbairegionalcongress.org.in

The Mumbai Regional Congress Committee (MRCC) is the unit of the Indian National Congress for the city of Mumbai. Although Mumbai is part of Maharashtra state, the Mumbai RCC functions as an independent Pradesh Congress Committee unit and is responsible for organizing and coordinating the party's activities and campaigns in the Mumbai Metropolitan Region of Maharashtra state. Prominent Congress leaders, including former prime ministers Indira Gandhi and Rajiv Gandhi, have been associated with it. The current president of the Mumbai Regional Congress Committee is Varsha Gaikwad.

== Office bearers ==
The Mumbai Regional Congress Committee is headed by President Varsha Gaikwad, while Charan Singh Sapra serves as the Working President. Zeenat Shabrin is the President of the Mumbai Youth Congress, and Umesh Padala serves as the Incharge of its Media Department. Mr. Pradyum Yadav is the President of Mumbai NSUI, and Janardan Singh is the President of Mumbai AIUWC. The Minority Department of the Mumbai Regional Congress Committee is chaired by Haji Ebrahim Shaikh.

== List of presidents ==
S.no	President	Portrait	Term		Duration
1	Murli Deora		1981	16 March 2003	22 years, 74 days
2	Gurudas Kamat		16 March 2003	15 August 2008	5 years, 152 days
3	Kripa Shankar Singh		15 August 2008	4 April 2013	4 years, 232 days
4	Janardhan Chandurkar		4 April 2013	15 January 2015	1 year, 286 days
5	Sanjay Nirupam		15 January 2015	25 March 2019	4 years, 69 days
6	Milind Deora		25 March 2019	6 September 2019	165 days
7	Eknath Gaikwad		6 September 2019	19 December 2020	1 year, 104 days
8	Bhai Jagtap		19 December 2020	9 June 2023	2 years, 172 days
9	Varsha Gaikwad		9 June 2023	Present	3 years, 111 days
