= Satish Pednekar =

Indian politician and former cabinet minister

Member of the Legislative Assembly
- In office 1980–1985
- Constituency: Parel

Home and Labour Minister of Maharashtra
- In office 1980–1985

Personal details
- Died: 2011 Mumbai, Maharashtra, India
- Party: Indian National Congress
- Spouse: Sumitra Pednekar
- Children: Bhumi Pednekar
- Occupation: Politician

Satish Pednekar was an Indian politician. In 1980, he was elected as a Member of the legislative assembly from the Parel Assembly constituency from the Indian National Congress party. He served as the Home and Labour Minister of Maharashtra, also handled the ministry of Slum Improvement, Home Repairs, and Reconstruction. He had also served as the head of Seva Dal.

== Personal life ==
Pednekar was married to Sumitra and the two had met when she was the general secretary for a students' union in Haryana and he was working with the Indian Youth Congress. His family was originally from Pernem, Goa. Pednekar died from complications of oral cancer, in 2011.

His daughter, Bhumi Pednekar, is an actress working in Hindi cinema.
