= Great Bombay textile strike =

1982 textile strike in Mumbai

The Great Bombay Textile Strike was a textile strike called on 18 January 1982 by the mill workers of Bombay (now Mumbai) under trade union leader Dutta Samant. The purpose of the strike was to obtain a bonus payment and increase in wages. Nearly 250,000 workers of 65 textile mills went on strike in Mumbai.

== History of mills in Bombay ==
Built in 1854 at Tardeo by Cowaszee Nanabhoy Davar (1815–73) and his associates, Bombay Spinning and Weaving Company was the first cotton mill to be established in Bombay. It was the first of the factories that spread over many parts of the island city in the next decades. Rastriya Mill Mazdoor Sangh was the officially recognized union of the Mills. By 1982, a new militant union leader by the name of Dutta Samant had arrived on the scene. Earlier he had got major wage increases for workers of Premier Automobiles Limited and a section of the mill workers were hoping he could facilitate the same for them. The major difference between Premier Automobiles and the mills was that the former was a very profitable company and the mills were all sick units. Later that year Dutta Samant led the textile strike, over 240,000 people worked in Girangaon.

== Protests ==
In late 1981, Dutta Samant was chosen by a large group of Bombay mill workers to lead them in a precarious conflict between the Bombay Mill Owners' Association and the unions, thus rejecting the INTUC-affiliated Rashtriya Mill Mazdoor Sangh (RMMS) which had represented the mill workers for decades. Samant planned a massive strike, forcing the entire industry of the city to be shut down for over a year. It was estimated that nearly 250,000 workers went on strike and more than 50 textile mills were shut in Bombay permanently.

Samant demanded that, along with wage hikes, the government scrap the Bombay Industrial Act of 1947 and that the RMMS would no longer be the only official union of the city industry. While fighting for greater pay and better conditions for the workers, Samant and his allies also sought to capitalize on and establish their power on the trade union scene in Mumbai. Although Samant had links with the Congress and Maharashtra politician Abdul Rehman Antulay, Prime Minister Indira Gandhi considered him a serious political threat. Samant's control of the mill workers made the Congress leaders fear that his influence would spread to the port and dock workers and make him the most powerful union leader in India's commercial capital. Thus the government took a firm stance of rejecting Samant's demands and refusing to budge despite the severe economic losses suffered by the city and the industry. As the strike progressed through the months, Samant's militancy in the face of government obstinacy led to the failure of any attempts at negotiation. Disunity and dissatisfaction over the strike soon became apparent, and many textile mill owners began moving their plants outside the city. After a prolonged and destabilizing confrontation, the strike collapsed with no concessions having been obtained for the workers. The closure of textile mills across the city left tens of thousands of mill workers unemployed and, in the succeeding years, most of the industry moved away from Bombay after decades of being plagued by rising costs and union militancy. It is one reason why some industries in India settled in Gujarat. Although Samant remained popular with a large block of union activists, his clout and control over Bombay trade unions disappeared.

== Consequences ==
The majority of the over 80 mills in Central Mumbai closed during and after the strike, leaving more than 150,000 workers unemployed. The textile industry in Mumbai has largely disappeared, reducing labour migration after the strikes.

One of the consequences of the strike's failure was that labour laws in the country were mellowed and 'liberalized' since unions lost their foothold. Until 1980s, labour laws were stringent to appease the unions. As labour market became less transparent and unified, exploitative placement agencies popped up in the city, so a large population moved to contractual employment, which lacked all the benefits of organised sector like provident funds or even job security. This job insecurity also pushed a lot of the youth, especially Maharashtrian youth into the arms of the regional party Shiv Sena, so even if their parents had been communists, the children became Shiv Sainiks.

The industries in Mumbai shut down and moved to the periphery or to other states as the land became a real estate gold mine. Mumbai's functional nature changed from industrial to commercial.

== Popular culture ==
The city was remade by the Dutta Samant-led textile strike. Many Bollywood film directors started making politically relevant films on textile strikes in Bombay, and textile mill strikes have become an important theme of modern-day Indian films. Producer Sangeeta Ahir, who is also a co-founder of the NGO Shree Sankalp Pratisthan is making a film on the Great Bombay Textile Strike worker movement of the city.

- Albert Pinto Ko Gussa Kyoon Aata Hai, a 1980 film directed by Saeed Akhtar Mirza
- City of Gold (2010 film) - directed by Mahesh Manjrekar
- Bombay Velvet, a 2015 film by Anurag Kashyap

== See also ==
- History of Mumbai
- Growth of Mumbai
