= Manohar Joshi =

Indian politician (1937–2024)

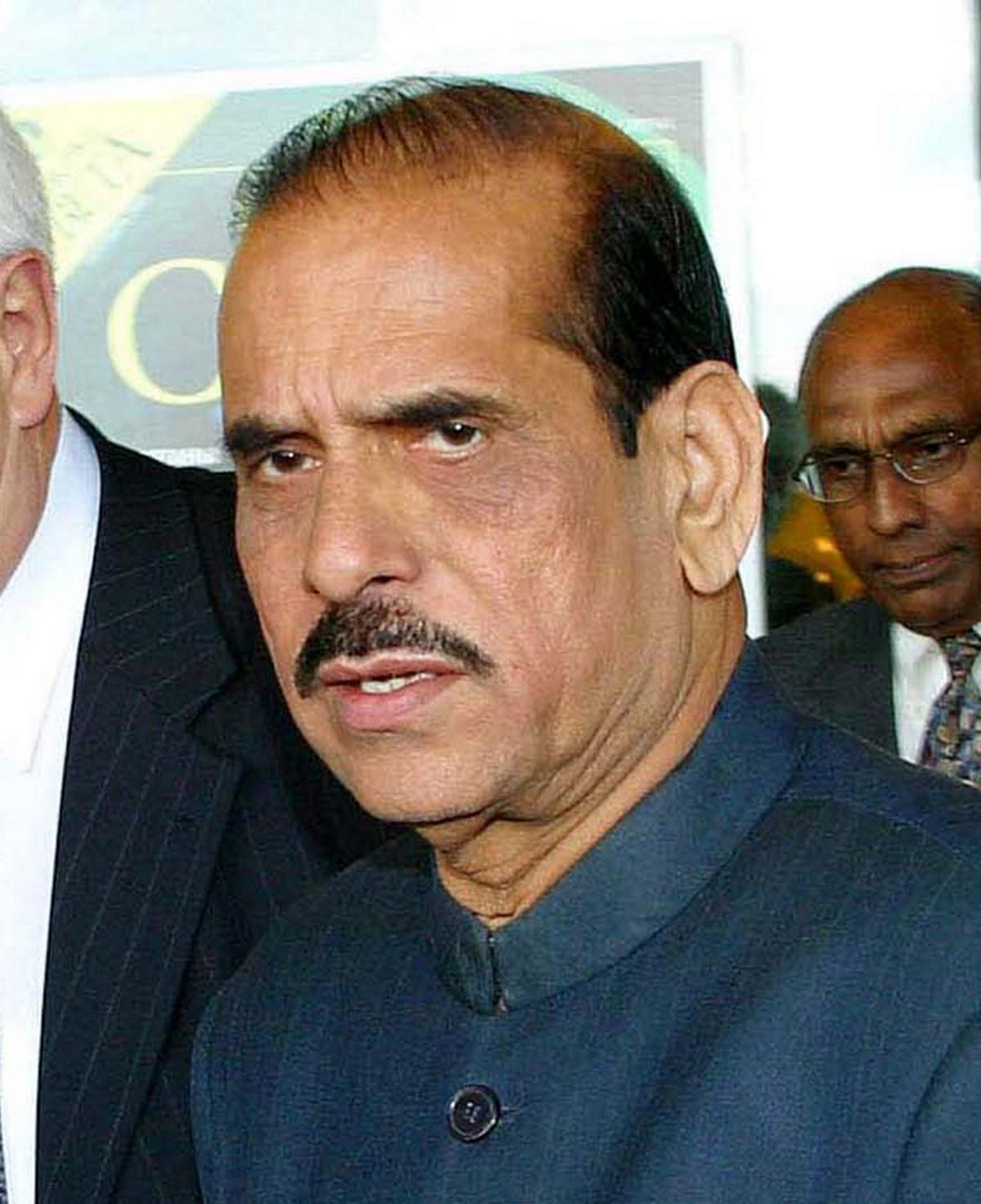
- Joshi in 2019

12th Chief Minister of Maharashtra
- In office 14 March 1995 – 31 January 1999
- Governor: P. C. Alexander
- Preceded by: Sharad Pawar
- Succeeded by: Narayan Rane

13th Speaker of the Lok Sabha
- In office 10 May 2002 – 2 June 2004
- President: A. P. J. Abdul Kalam
- Deputy: P. M. Sayeed
- Leader of the House: Atal Bihari Vajpayee
- Preceded by: G. M. C. Balayogi
- Succeeded by: Somnath Chatterjee

Union Minister of Heavy Industries and Public Enterprises
- In office 19 October 1999 – 9 May 2002
- Prime Minister: Atal Bihari Vajpayee
- Preceded by: Chandra Shekhar
- Succeeded by: Anant Geete

Leader of Shiv Sena
- In office 19 June 1966 – 23 February 2024
- President: Bal Thackeray (1966–2012); Uddhav Thackeray (2012–2022)

Leader of the House in Maharashtra Legislative Assembly
- In office 14 March 1995 – 31 January 1999
- Preceded by: Sharad Pawar
- Succeeded by: Narayan Rane

13th Leader of the Opposition in Maharashtra Legislative Assembly
- In office 22 March 1990 – 12 December 1991
- Preceded by: Mrinal Gore
- Succeeded by: Gopinath Munde

Mayor of Mumbai
- In office 1976–1977
- Preceded by: Mehta
- Succeeded by: Murli Deora

Member of Parliament, Lok Sabha
- In office 1999–2004
- Preceded by: Ramdas Athawale
- Succeeded by: Eknath Gaikwad
- Constituency: Mumbai North Central, Maharashtra

Member of Parliament, Rajya Sabha
- In office 2006–2012
- Preceded by: Ram Jethmalani
- Succeeded by: Anil Desai
- Constituency: Maharashtra

Member of Maharashtra Legislative Assembly
- In office 1990–1999
- Preceded by: Sharayu Thakur
- Succeeded by: Vishakha Raut
- Constituency: Dadar

Member of Maharashtra Legislative Council
- In office 1972–1989
- Constituency: Nominated

Councillor of Brihanmumbai Municipal Corporation
- In office 1968–1972
- Constituency: Dadar

Personal details
- Born: 2 December 1937 Raigad, Bombay Province, British India
- Died: 23 February 2024 (aged 86) Mumbai, Maharashtra, India
- Party: Shiv Sena
- Spouse: Anagha Joshi
- Children: 3
- Relatives: Sharvari Wagh (granddaughter)

Manohar Gajanan Joshi (2 December 1937 – 23 February 2024) was an Indian politician from the state of Maharashtra, who served as the Chief Minister of Maharashtra from 1995 to 1999, and Speaker of the Lok Sabha from 2002 to 2004. He was one of the prominent leaders of the Shiv Sena, and also one of the few Indians to be elected to all of the four legislatures. He was posthumously awarded the Padma Bhushan, India's third-highest civilian honour, by the Government of India in 2025.

== Early life ==
Joshi was born on 2 December 1937 in the Marathi-speaking Brahmin family of Gajanan Krishna Joshi and Saraswati Gajanan in Nandavi of Raigad district in Maharashtra. He received his Masters of Arts and LLB degrees from Mumbai University. He married Anagha Joshi on 14 May 1964, with whom he had a son, Unmesh, and two daughters, Asmita and Namrata. His granddaughter, Sharvari Wagh, is a Bollywood actress who made her debut in the 2021 film Bunty Aur Babli 2.

== Formation of Kohinoor ==
After receiving his MA in law he joined Brihanmumbai Municipal Corporation (BMC) as an officer, but later started the Kohinoor technical/vocational training institute with the idea of an institute for semi–skilled youths who could be trained as electricians, plumbers, TV/radio/scooter repairmen and photographers. Eventually, he started multiple branches of Kohinoor in Mumbai, Pune, Nagpur, Nashik, etc., He later made an entry into construction and another capital-oriented business.

Manohar Joshi also founded the Kohinoor Business School & Kohinoor-IMI School of Hospitality Management in Khandala, Maharashtra. Later, he took on the Chancellorship of Dnyaneshwar Vidyapeeth.

== Political career ==
=== Early years ===
Joshi began his career by being elected as a municipal councillor in Bombay Municipal Corporation in 1968 from the Shiv Sena.

In 1972 Joshi was elected to the Maharashtra Legislative Council, where he served three terms until 1989. He became the Mayor of Mumbai during 1976 to 1977. He was elected to the Legislative Assembly from a Shiv Sena ticket in 1990.

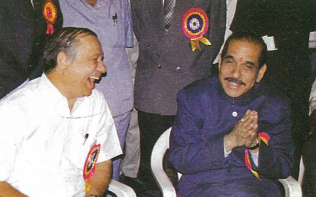
Joshi with former BCCI vice-president Dnyaneshwar Agashe.

=== Chief Minister ===
Joshi became the first non-Congress Chief Minister of Maharashtra when the Shiv Sena-Bharatiya Janata Party (BJP) coalition came to power in 1995. Technically, Sharad Pawar led the first non-Congress government in Maharashtra in 1978 as a member of Socialist Indian National Congress.

=== Controversy and resignation ===
Joshi and Bal Thackeray were explicitly named for inciting the Shivsainiks to violence against Muslims during the 1992–1993 riots in an inquiry ordered by the government of India, the Srikrishna Commission Report. However, Joshi, then a part of the BJP-Sena government called the report "anti-Hindu, pro-Muslim and biased" and refused to adopt the commission's recommendations.

As Chief Minister, he had permitted the release of a plot of land in Pune, reserved for a school, to a builder with ties to his son-in-law, Girish Vyas. A housing complex, named Sundew, was built on that land by Vyas in 1998. Sustained legal efforts by Vijay Kumbhar, an RTI activist from Pune, led to Joshi's resignation in January 1999. In March 2009, Bombay High Court passed a verdict calling the housing complex illegal. The Supreme Court of India upheld the verdict in 2011 and fined Joshi Rs 15,000. Following its order, the building is now being used for a school.

=== Lok Sabha and Speaker ===
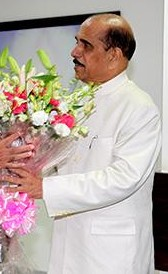

Joshi was promoted to the Lok Sabha when he won in Central Mumbai in the 1999 General Elections. He was the Speaker of the Lok Sabha from 2002 to 2004 during the National Democratic Alliance (NDA) administration.

Joshi was elected for a six-year term to the Rajya Sabha on 20 March 2006 after being defeated in the previous Lok Sabha election in the Central Mumbai constituency.

=== National Legislator Conference ===
In September 2022, Manohar Joshi was appointed a key patron of NLC Bharat.

== Death ==
Manohar Joshi died in Mumbai on 23 February 2024, at the age of 86. He had suffered a cardiac arrest a day earlier and been placed in Hinduja hospital's intensive care unit, dying the next day of age-related health complications.

== See also ==
- Manohar Joshi ministry
- List of chief ministers of Maharashtra

Lok Sabha
Preceded by Ramdas Athawale	Member of Parliament for Mumbai North Central; 1999–2004	Succeeded by Eknath Gaikwad
Political offices
Preceded by Sharad Pawar	Chief Minister of Maharashtra; 14 March 1995 – 31 January 1999	Succeeded by Narayan Rane
Preceded by G. M. C. Balayogi	Speaker of Lok Sabha; 2002–2004	Succeeded by Somnath Chatterjee
