= Growth of Mumbai =

Mumbai was a cluster of islands before a huge land reclamation process took place to increase its area. The city became more and more relevant during British times, when it was used as a port city and became a centre of economic growth and progress in India. The city was capital of Bombay state before the formation of state of Maharashtra. It became financial centre of India and attracted people from all across India which resulted in booming population growth of the city.The following is a timeline of the growth of Mumbai's population over the last four centuries:

- 1661: 10000 inhabitants
- 1664: 15000
- 1673: 60000 (Fryer)
- 1675: 60000
- 1718: 16000 (Cobbe)
- 1744: 70000 (Niebuhr) (large influx of people during the busy season)
- 1764: 140000 (Niebuhr), According to Historical account pg 6, pop was 60,000
- 1780: 100,000 Materials etc. Part III, pg 525—Mahim 13,726
- 1812: 235,000 (Hall) Fixed 165,000, migratory 50,000, famine increase 20,000
- 1814: 180,000 (Warden)
- 1830: 229,000 Lagrange
- 1836: 236,000 "-do-
- 1864: 816,562
- 1872: 644,605 (census)
- 1881: 773,196 (census)
- 1891: 821,764 (census)
- 1901: 812,912 (Greater Bombay)
- 1911: 1,018,388
- 1921: 1,244,934
- 1931: 1,268,936
- 1941: 1,686,127
- 1951: 2,966,902 (0.1% of the world population)
- 1961: 4,152,056
- 1971: 5,970,575
- 1981: 8,227,382
- 1991: 9,900,000 + 2,600,000 (Thané) = 12,500,000 (Greater Bombay)
- 2001: 16,368,084 (Greater Mumbai, incl. Thané)
- 2005: 18,366,089 (Greater Mumbai, incl. Thane)
- 2011: 18,410,000
- 2020: 20,411,274

== See also ==
- Housing in Mumbai
