= Parel Assembly constituency =

Former constituency of the Maharashtra legislative assembly in India

Coordinates: 18.998°N 72.840°E

Parel
- Former constituency No. 14 for the Maharashtra Legislative Assembly

Constituency details
- Country: India
- Region: Western India
- State: Maharashtra
- Lok Sabha constituency: Mumbai North Central
- Established: 1952
- Abolished: 2008

Parel was one of the constituencies of Maharashtra Legislative Assembly, in India. It was last represented by Dagdu Sakpal of the Shiv Sena.

== Members of the Legislative Assembly ==
Year	Member	Party
From 1952 - 1957 see: Lalbaug Parel
1952	Madhav Dattatraya Desai	Indian National Congress
1957	Vyankatesh Shenoy	Praja Socialist Party
1962	Madhavrao Mani	Indian National Congress
1967	Krishna Desai	Communist Party of India
1970^	Wamanrao Mahadik	Shiv Sena
1972	Gajanan Loke	Indian National Congress
1978	Vasu Desai	Janata Party
1980	Satish Pednekar	Indian National Congress
1985	Sharad Khatu	Independent politician
1990	Vitthal Chavan	Shiv Sena
1995	Suryakant Desai	Shiv Sena
1999	Dagdu Sakpal	Shiv Sena
2004	Dagdu Sakpal	Shiv Sena
2008 onwards: Constituency merged into Shivadi

== Election results ==
=== Assembly Election 2004 ===
2004 Maharashtra Legislative Assembly election : Parel
Party	Candidate	Votes	%	±%
SS	Dagdu Haribhau Sakpal	50,646	66.36%	▲11.83
INC	Ghandat Sandeep Sitaram	20,967	27.47%	▲6.39
ABS	Sanjay Prabhakar Girkar	4,703	6.16%	▲4.83
Margin of victory		29,679	38.89%	▲5.44
Turnout		76,320	55.98%	▲9.16
Total valid votes		76,316		
Registered electors		1,36,334		▼2.66
SS hold		Swing	▲11.83	

=== Assembly Election 1999 ===
1999 Maharashtra Legislative Assembly election : Parel
Party	Candidate	Votes	%	±%
SS	Dagdu Haribhau Sakpal	35,759	54.53%	▲3.20
INC	Arun Govind Nare	13,823	21.08%	▼3.24
NCP	Vishnu (Baban) Jairam Kanavje	13,534	20.64%	New
Independent	Chandrakant Wairkar (Master)	1,105	1.69%	New
ABS	Colonol (Retired) Ashok Mhatre	876	1.34%	New
Independent	Shankar Sandipan Hegade	478	0.73%	New
Margin of victory		21,936	33.45%	▲6.43
Turnout		65,577	46.82%	▼19.24
Total valid votes		65,575		
Registered electors		1,40,060		▲1.98
SS hold		Swing	▲3.20	

=== Assembly Election 1995 ===
1995 Maharashtra Legislative Assembly election : Parel
Party	Candidate	Votes	%	±%
SS	Desai Suryakant Gangaram	46,574	51.34%	▲0.39
INC	Dr. Jagannathrao Hegde	22,061	24.32%	▲1.53
Independent	Chandrakant Wairkar (Master)	11,194	12.34%	New
Samajwadi Janata Party (Maharashtra)	Sharad Khatu	4,551	5.02%	New
Independent	Parkar Shridhar Narayan	4,384	4.83%	New
Independent	Chandrakant Mahadeo Jadhav	607	0.67%	New
Independent	Dr. Satyavan Bhau Nandoskar	550	0.61%	New
Margin of victory		24,513	27.02%	▲2.05
Turnout		92,270	67.19%	▲5.30
Total valid votes		90,725		
Registered electors		1,37,336		▼5.33
SS hold		Swing	▲0.39	

=== Assembly Election 1990 ===
1990 Maharashtra Legislative Assembly election : Parel
Party	Candidate	Votes	%	±%
SS	Vithal Chavan	44,907	50.95%	New
JD	Sharad Khatu	22,899	25.98%	New
INC	Satish Pednekar	20,086	22.79%	▼1.46
Margin of victory		22,008	24.97%	▲19.57
Turnout		89,009	61.36%	▲2.83
Total valid votes		88,140		
Registered electors		1,45,071		▲10.20
SS gain from Independent		Swing	▲21.30	

=== Assembly Election 1985 ===
1985 Maharashtra Legislative Assembly election : Parel
Party	Candidate	Votes	%	±%
Independent	Sharad Khatu	22,613	29.65%	New
INC	Jagannathrao Hegde	18,493	24.25%	New
Independent	Nagesh Pawar	17,709	23.22%	New
JP	Laxman Jadhab	11,904	15.61%	▼29.95
CPI	Baburao Shankar Shelar	4,913	6.44%	New
Independent	Ramshiromani Yadav	505	0.66%	New
Margin of victory		4,120	5.40%	▼3.47
Turnout		77,041	58.52%	▲15.81
Total valid votes		76,257		
Registered electors		1,31,648		▲2.07
Independent gain from INC(I)		Swing	▼24.78	

=== Assembly Election 1980 ===
1980 Maharashtra Legislative Assembly election : Parel
Party	Candidate	Votes	%	±%
INC(I)	Satish Pednekar	29,570	54.44%	▲45.67
JP	Vasu Desai	24,750	45.56%	▼5.09
Margin of victory		4,820	8.87%	▼22.44
Turnout		54,983	42.63%	▼29.30
Total valid votes		54,320		
Registered electors		1,28,981		▲5.70
INC(I) gain from JP		Swing	▲3.78	

=== Assembly Election 1978 ===
1978 Maharashtra Legislative Assembly election : Parel
Party	Candidate	Votes	%	±%
JP	Vasu Desai	44,147	50.66%	New
SS	Dattaji Salvi	16,856	19.34%	▼17.00
INC	Gajanan Shankar Loke	11,549	13.25%	▼37.74
INC(I)	Kandalkar Tukaram Ganesh	7,636	8.76%	New
CPI	Chitnis Gangadhar Vishnu	6,789	7.79%	▼3.59
Margin of victory		27,291	31.32%	▲16.66
Turnout		88,516	72.54%	▼0.21
Total valid votes		87,147		
Registered electors		1,22,022		▲29.90
JP gain from INC		Swing	▼0.34	

=== Assembly Election 1972 ===
1972 Maharashtra Legislative Assembly election : Parel
Party	Candidate	Votes	%	±%
INC	Gajanan Shankar Loke	34,310	50.99%	New
SS	Vaman Shivram Mahadik	24,451	36.34%	New
CPI	Prabhakar Balwant Vaidya	7,656	11.38%	New
INC(O)	Aba Deugaonkar	866	1.29%	New
Margin of victory		9,859	14.65%	
Turnout		68,308	72.72%	
Total valid votes		67,283		
Registered electors		93,934		
INC gain from Independent		Swing		

=== Assembly By-election 1970 ===
1970 Maharashtra Legislative Assembly by-election : Parel
Party	Candidate	Votes	%	±%
Independent	Wamanrao Mahadik	31,592		New
CPI	Sanjivani Krushna Desai	29,913		
Margin of victory		1,679		
Turnout				
Total valid votes		0		
Independent gain from CPI		Swing		

=== Assembly Election 1967 ===
1967 Maharashtra Legislative Assembly election : Parel
Party	Candidate	Votes	%	±%
CPI	Krishna Gangaram Desai	28,847	47.38%	New
INC	Madhavrao Ganpatrao Mani	18,231	29.94%	▼15.86
PSP	A. B. Vichare	9,282	15.24%	▲3.46
Independent	S. S. Paul	2,361	3.88%	New
SWA	N. K. Jagtap	2,168	3.56%	New
Margin of victory		10,616	17.44%	▲7.34
Turnout		62,863	73.56%	▲8.18
Total valid votes		60,889		
Registered electors		85,463		▲18.79
CPI gain from INC		Swing	▲1.57	

=== Assembly Election 1962 ===
1962 Maharashtra Legislative Assembly election : Parel
Party	Candidate	Votes	%	±%
INC	Madhavrao Ganpatrao Mani	20,784	45.80%	▲11.87
Independent	Krishna Gangaram Desai	16,203	35.71%	New
PSP	Vishwanath Krishna Tembe	5,349	11.79%	▼54.28
ABJS	Prabhakar Ramchandra Keluskar	2,345	5.17%	New
Socialist Party (India)	Shridhar Vasudeo Redkar	694	1.53%	New
Margin of victory		4,581	10.10%	▼22.04
Turnout		47,450	65.95%	▼9.07
Total valid votes		45,375		
Registered electors		71,943		▲18.75
INC gain from PSP		Swing	▼20.26	

=== Assembly Election 1957 ===
1957 Bombay State Legislative Assembly election : Parel
Party	Candidate	Votes	%	±%
PSP	Shenoy Vyankatesh Appa	28,876	66.07%	New
INC	Gaonkar Hari Dharmaji	14,832	33.93%	New
Margin of victory		14,044	32.13%	
Turnout		43,708	72.15%	
Total valid votes		43,708		
Registered electors		60,583		
PSP win (new seat)				

== See also ==
- List of constituencies of Maharashtra Legislative Assembly
