= Eknath Gaikwad =

Indian politician (1940–2021)

Member of Parliament, Lok Sabha
- In office 2009–2014
- Preceded by: Mohan Rawale
- Succeeded by: Rahul Shewale
- Constituency: Mumbai South Central
- In office 2004–2009
- Preceded by: Manohar Joshi
- Succeeded by: Priya Dutt
- Constituency: Mumbai North Central

Member of Maharashtra Legislative Assembly
- In office (1985-1990), (1990-1995), (1999 – 2004)
- Preceded by: Premanand Awale
- Succeeded by: Varsha Gaikwad
- Constituency: Dharavi

Maharashtra State Minister for Health, Medical Education, Social Justice, Housing and Slum Development and Labour
- In office 1999–2004

Personal details
- Born: 1 January 1940 Satara, Bombay Presidency, British India
- Died: 28 April 2021 (aged 81) Mumbai, Maharashtra, India
- Party: Indian National Congress
- Spouse: Lalita Eknath Gaikwad
- Children: 2 sons (including Tushar Gaikwad) and 2 daughters (including Varsha Gaikwad & Jyoti Gaikwad)

Eknath Mahadev Gaikwad (1 January 1940 – 28 April 2021) was an Indian politician from the Indian National Congress (INC) political party. He was a member of the 15th Lok Sabha and the 14th Lok Sabha of India. He died from COVID-19 in 2021.

== Personal life ==
Gaikwad belonged to an Ambedkarite Buddhist family. Gaikwad's daughter is Varsha Gaikwad, who is a four term Member of Maharashtra Legislative Assembly and a ex-Cabinet Minister of Maharashtra.

== Career ==
He represented the Mumbai South Central Lok Sabha constituency of Mumbai. He lost the seat to Rahul Shewale in 2014. He has been three times a Member of Legislative Assembly from Dharavi and also twice state minister of Maharashtra state cabinet. Since 1985, he has represented Dharavi which is Asia's largest slum.

== Positions held ==
- 1985-1990: Member of Maharashtra Legislative Assembly
- 1990-1995: Member of Maharashtra Legislative Assembly
- 1999-2004: Member of Maharashtra Legislative Assembly
- 1999-2004: Maharashtra State Minister For Health, Medical Education, Social Justice, Housing and Slum Development and Labour
- 2004-2009: Member of Parliament, Lok Sabha
- 2009-2014: Member of Parliament, Lok Sabha
- 2017-2020: President Of Mumbai Congress Committee

Lok Sabha
Preceded by Manohar Joshi	Member of Parliament for Mumbai North Central; 2004 – 2009	Succeeded by Priya Dutt
Preceded by Mohan Rawale	Member of Parliament for Mumbai South Central; 2009 – 2014	Succeeded by Rahul Shewale
