= Jyoti Gaikwad =

Indian politician

Member of the Maharashtra Legislative Assembly
- Incumbent
- Assumed office 2024
- Preceded by: Varsha Gaikwad
- Constituency: Dharavi

Personal details
- Party: Indian National Congress
- Relations: Varsha Gaikwad (sister)
- Parent: Eknath Gaikwad (father)
- Profession: Politician

Jyoti Eknath Gaikwad is an Indian politician from Maharashtra. She is a Member of Maharashtra Legislative Assembly from 2024, representing Dharavi Assembly constituency as a member of the Indian National Congress.

Jyoti Eknath Gaikwad elected to the 15th Maharashtra Assembly for the first time from the Dharavi Assembly constituency reserved for Scheduled Caste in the 2024 Assembly Elections. Earlier, Jyoti Gaikwad's sister and sitting MP Varsha Gaikwad was elected for four consecutive terms from Dharavi assembly constituency. In the 2024 Lok Sabha elections, Varsha Gaikwad became an MP from the Mumbai North Central Lok Sabha constituency.

Jyoti Gaikwad belongs to the Ambedkarite Buddhist community. Her father Eknath Gaikwad was also a three-time MP. She is the only Buddhist woman MLA in the 15th Maharashtra Legislative Assembly. Apart from this, she is also the only woman MLA of Maha Vikas Aghadi. In the 2024 Maharashtra Assembly elections, Jyoti Gaikwad secured 70,727 votes and defeated Shinde faction's Shiv Sena candidate Rajesh Shivdas Khandare by 23,459 votes.

== See also ==
- List of chief ministers of Maharashtra
- Maharashtra Legislative Assembly
