= R. Tamil Selvan =

Indian politician

Captain R. Tamil Selvan

Member of the Maharashtra Legislative Assembly
- Incumbent
- Assumed office 2014
- Preceded by: Jagannath Shetty
- Constituency: Sion Koliwada

Personal details
- Born: 8 December 1958 (age 67) Pilaviduthi, Karambakkudi, Pudukottai
- Party: Bharatiya Janata Party
- Occupation: Politician
- Website: mahabjp.org

Captain R. Tamil Selvan is a leader of Bharatiya Janata Party. He is elected to Maharashtra Legislative Assembly in 2014, 2019, and 2024 from Sion-Koliwada constituency. He served as a corporator in Mumbai Municipal Corporation. During the 26/11 Mumbai attacks in 2008, Selvan, then a railway parcel contractor at Chhatrapati Shivaji Terminus, along with his team, saved approximately 36 lives when Ajmal Kasab and his associate began firing.
