= Anil Desai =

Indian politician

Member of Parliament, Lok Sabha
- Incumbent
- Assumed office 2024
- Preceded by: Rahul Shewale
- Constituency: Mumbai South Central

Member of Parliament, Rajya Sabha
- In office 2012–2024
- Preceded by: Manohar Joshi
- Succeeded by: Milind Deora
- Constituency: Maharashtra

Personal details
- Born: 2 May 1957 (age 69) Bombay (now Mumbai, Maharashtra, India)
- Party: Shiv Sena(UBT)
- Spouse: Priti Desai
- Children: 2
- Education: Mumbai University

Anil Desai is an Indian politician belonging to the Shiv Sena (Uddhav Balasaheb Thackeray). He is a member of the Lok Sabha, the Lower house of Indian Parliament from Maharashtra. Anil Desai is considered to be excellent at managing elections, legal matters and back room activities. He has played a major role in managing the party’s resources and floated ideas like coining the slogan, UTha Maharashtra (Wake up, Maharashtra). He is known as the party’s sober face.

In 2020, Desai promoted a Two-child policy with the Constitution (Amendment) Bill; Desai proposed to amend the Article 47A of the Constitution of India to state -

The State shall promote small family norms by offering incentives in taxes, employment, education etc. to its people who keep their family limited to two children and shall withdraw every concession from and deprive such incentives to those not adhering to small family norm, to keep the growing population under control.

== Positions held ==
- 2002: All India Party Secretary, Shiv Sena
- 2005: General Secretary, Sthaniya Lokadhikar Samiti Mahasangh (Federation), an affiliated organisation of Shiv Sena
- 2012: Elected to Rajya Sabha (1st term)
- 2018: Re-Elected to Rajya Sabha (2nd term)
- 2024:elected to Loksabha from Mumbai South Central

== See also ==
- Rajya Sabha Members
