= Wamanrao Mahadik =

Indian politician

Member of Parliament, Lok Sabha
- In office 1989–1991
- Constituency: Mumbai South Central

Member of Maharashtra Legislative Council
- In office 1980–1986

Member of Maharashtra Legislative Assembly
- In office 1970–1972
- Preceded by: Krishna Desai
- Succeeded by: Gajanan Shankar Loke
- Constituency: Parel

Personal details
- Born: March 17, 1925 Talere, Kankavli, Sindhudurg, Bombay State
- Died: October 12, 1999 (aged 74) Mumbai, Maharashtra
- Party: Shiv Sena

Wamanrao Mahdik (17 March 1925–12 October 1999) was a leader of the Shiv Sena. He was the first Shiv Sena member elected to the Maharashtra Legislative Assembly. He was elected from Parel Assembly constituency in 1969–70 by poll. He was mayor of Mumbai in 1978.

He was a member of Maharashtra Legislative Council during 1980–1986. He was member of 9th Lok Sabha (1989–1991) elected from Mumbai South Central Lok Sabha constituency. He contested 1991 Lok Sabha election from Rajapur with Shiv Sena - BJP alliance and came second, pushing Madhu Dandavate of Janata Dal to third place.

Wamanrao Mahadik was born on 17 March 1925 at Talere, Tehsil-Kankavali, Sindhudurg district, Maharashtra. He died in Mumbai on 12 October 1999.
