= Nitin Sardesai =

Indian politician

Nitin Vijaykumar Sardesai
- Born: 22 December 1963 (age 62)
- Occupation: Politician

Nitin Sardesai is a politician from the Maharashtra state of India. He belongs to the political party of Maharashtra Navnirman Sena (MNS) and is a member of the Maharashtra Legislative Assembly since 2009.

== Political career ==
Sardesai has been friends with Raj Thackeray, the founder and president of MNS, since their college days. He is a partner with Thackeray in the real estate agency called "Matoshree Infrastructure". He is also the General Secretary and Chief Coordinator of MNS and president of Hawai Karmachari Sena (HAKSE), the wing of MNS which works for the Air Services employees. HAKSE was launched in November 2008 as a labour union in aviation sector. Earlier in October 2008, more than 1900 employees were sacked by Jet Airways but were taken back after MNS staged protests.

After formation of MNS in 2006, the party contested its first state assembly elections in 2009. Sardesai contested from the Mahim constituency of Mumbai and won. He defeated Sadanand Saravankar of Indian National Congress and actor-politician Aadesh Bandekar of Shiv Sena. In the 2014 Assembly elections, he was defeated by INC-return Shiv Sena turncoat and former MLA Sadanand "Sada" Sarvankar.

== See also ==
- Raj Thakeray
