= Mumbai City district =

- District of Maharashtra
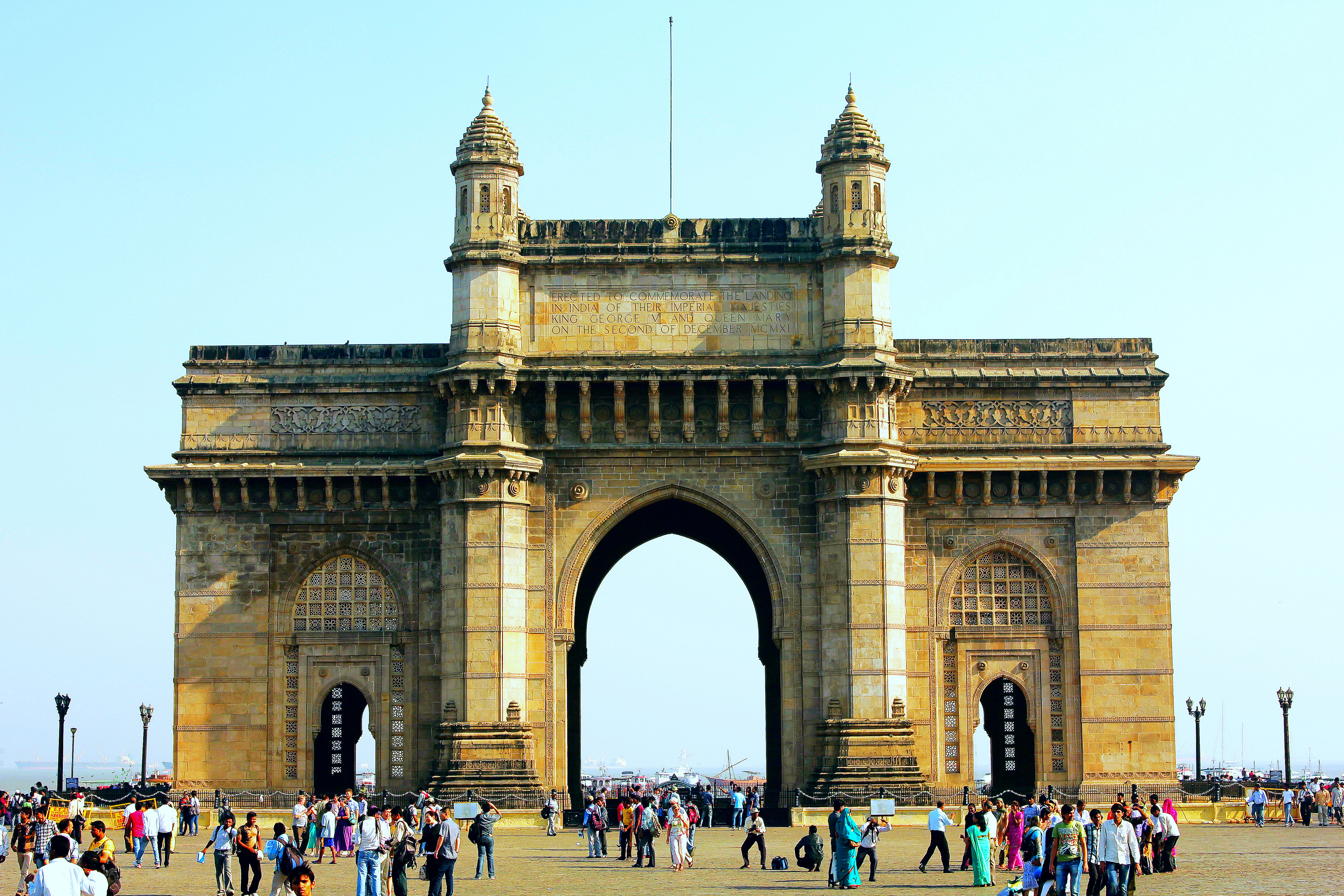
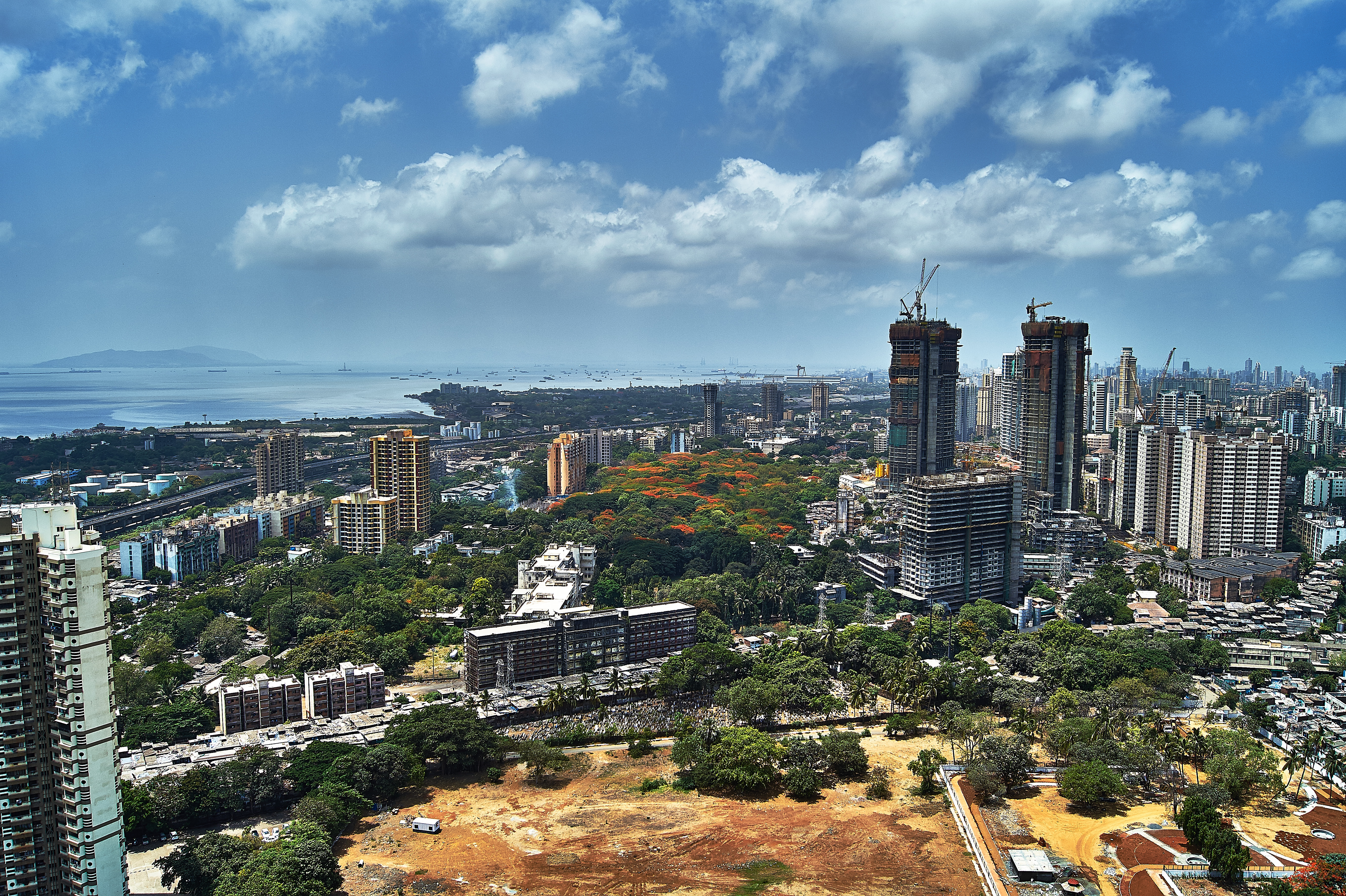
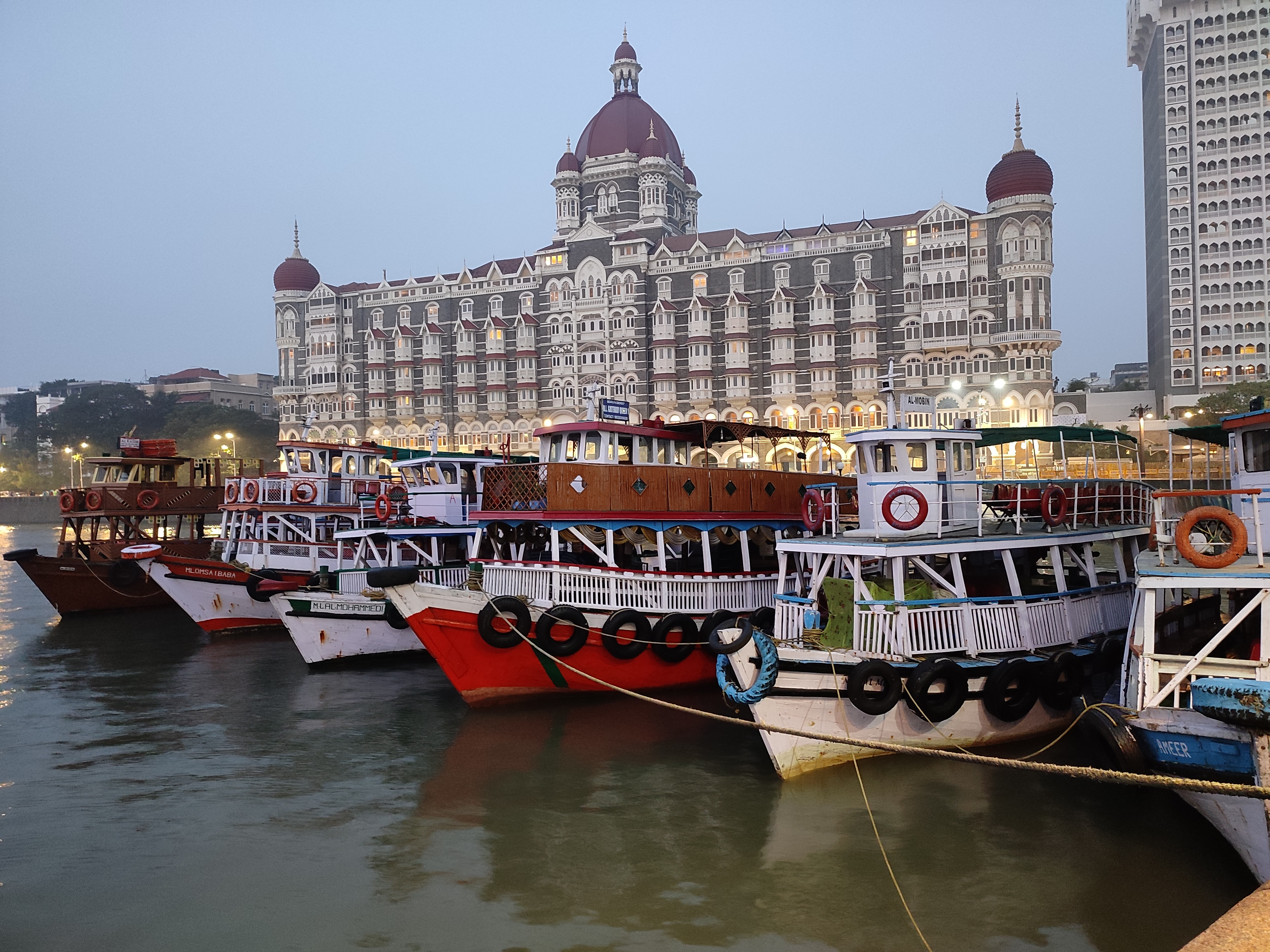
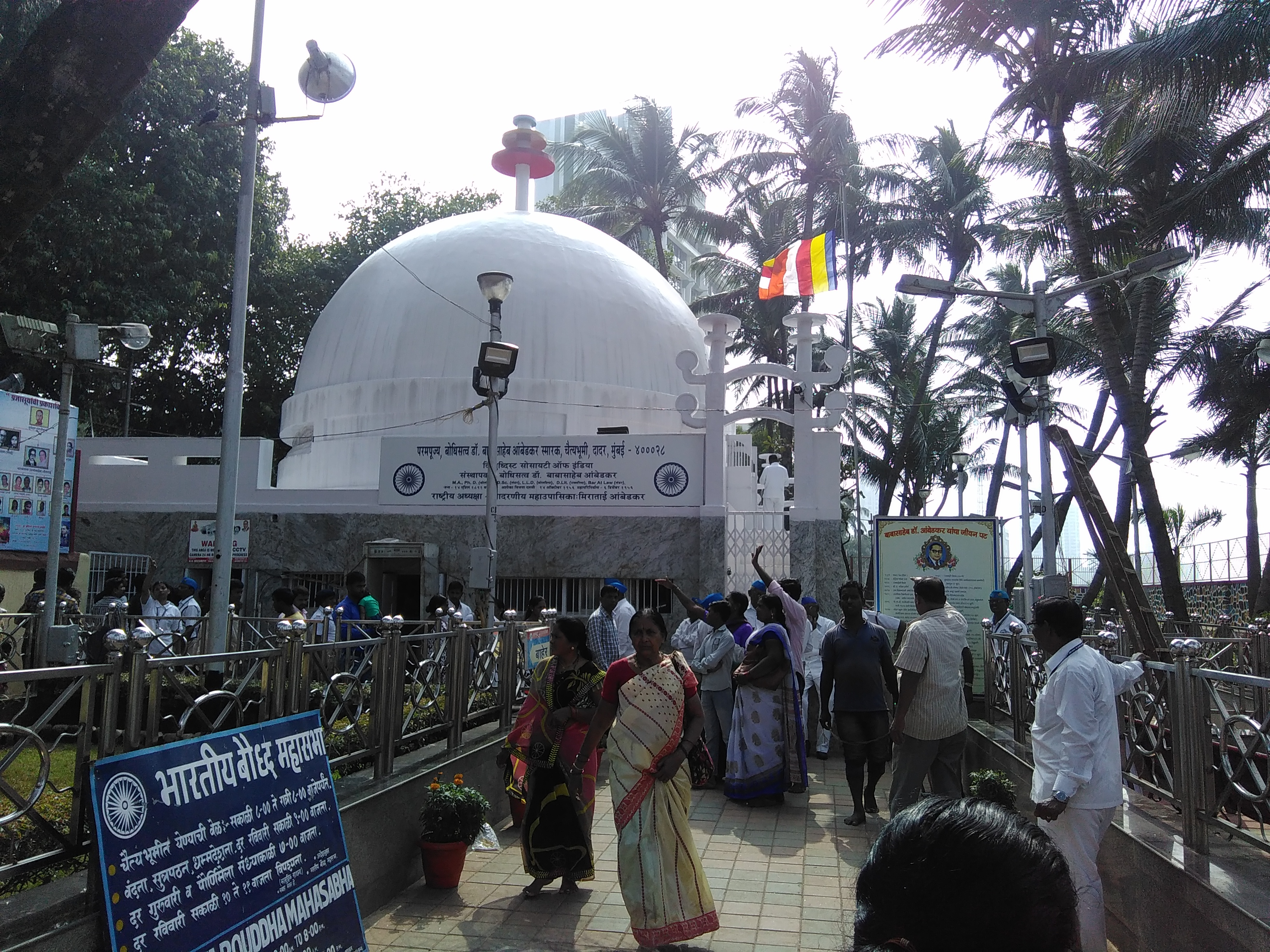
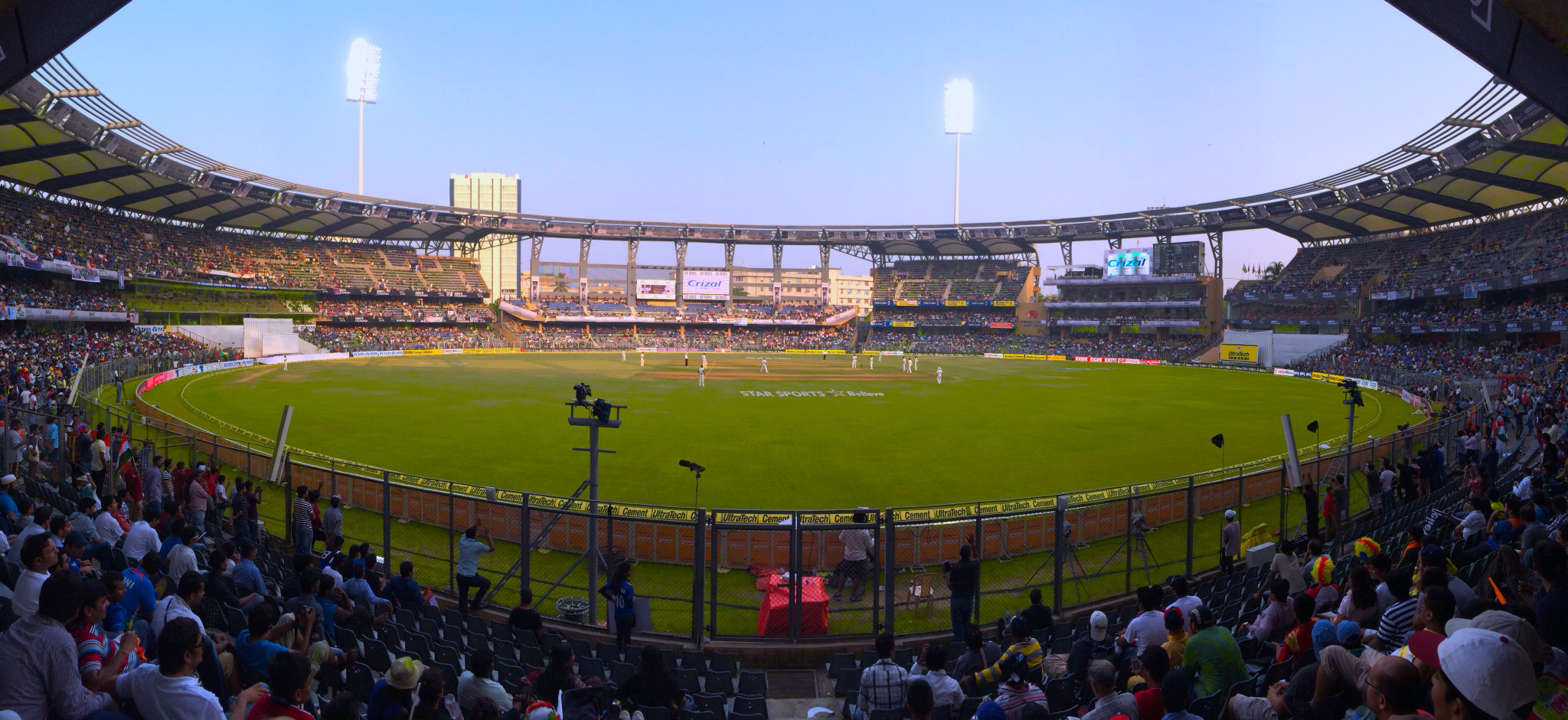
- Clockwise from top-left: Gateway of India, South Mumbai Harbour, Chaitya Bhoomi, Wankhede Stadium, Taj Mahal Palace Hotel

- Location in Maharashtra
- Coordinates: 18.96°N 72.82°E
- Country: India
- State: Maharashtra
- Division: Konkan

Government
  - Body: Brihanmumbai Municipal Corporation
  - Guardian Minister: Eknath Shinde (Deputy Chief Minister)
  - Mayor: Mayor Ritu Tawde; Deputy Mayor Sanjay Ghadi
  - District Collector: Shri Sanjay Yadav (IAS)
  - Municipal Commissioner & Administrator: Bhushan Gagrani (IAS)
  - MPs: Anil Desai (Mumbai South Central); Arvind Sawant (Mumbai South)

Area
  - Total: 157 km^{2} (61 sq mi)

Population (2024)
  - Total: 3,304,000
  - Density: 21,000/km^{2} (54,500/sq mi)
- Time zone: UTC+5:30 (IST)
- Website: https://mumbaicity.gov.in/

Mumbai City district is a district of Maharashtra in Konkan Division, India. As a city district, it has no headquarters or subdivisions. It, along with the Mumbai Suburban District, makes up the metropolis of Mumbai. This area is called the "Island City" or South Mumbai or Old Mumbai. It occupies the southern tip of Salsette Island and extends from Colaba in the south to Mahim and Sion in the north. The city has an area of 157 km^{2} (61 sq mi) and a population of 3,085,411.

== Proposed Talukas ==
- Mumbai Colaba
- Mumbai Fort
- Mumbai Malabar Hills
- Mumbai Byculla
- Mumbai Dadar
- Dharavi

== Officer ==
=== Members of Parliament ===
- Anil Desai
  (Mumbai South Central)
- Arvind Sawant
  (Mumbai South)

=== Guardian Minister ===
Guardian Minister Mumbai City
- पालकमंत्री मुंबई शहर
- Emblem of India
- Incumbent; Eknath Shinde since 18 January 2025
- Style: The Honourable
- Appointer: Chief Minister of Maharashtra
- Term length: 5 years / No time limit
- Website: mumbaicity.gov.in/en/

==== list of Guardian Minister ====
Name	Term of office
Jayant Patil; Cabinet Minister	07 November 2009 10 November 2010
R. R. Patil; Cabinet Minister	11 November 2010 – 26 September 2014
Subash Desai; Cabinet Minister	31 October 2014 - 8 November 2019
Aslam Shaikh; Cabinet Minister	9 January 2020 - 29 June 2022
Deepak Kesarkar; Cabinet Minister	24 September 2022 - 26 November 2024
Eknath Shinde (Deputy Chief Minister)	18 January 2025 - Incumbent

=== District Magistrate/Collector ===
District Magistrate / Collector Mumbai City
- जिल्हाधिकारी तथा जिल्हदंडाधिकरी मुंबई शहर
- Emblem of India
- Incumbent; Shri Sanjay Yadav (IAS) since 2024
- Residence: At Mumbai City district
- Appointer: Government of Maharashtra
- Term length: No time limit
- Website: mumbaicity.gov.in/en/

==== list of District Magistrate / Collector ====
Name	Term of office
Aanchal Goyal (IAS)	2025 - Incumbent

== History ==
Historical population
Year	Pop.	±% p.a.
1901	721,776	—
1911	893,481	+2.16%
1921	1,073,685	+1.85%
1931	1,087,191	+0.13%
1941	1,401,059	+2.57%
1951	2,329,020	+5.21%
1961	2,771,933	+1.76%
1971	3,070,378	+1.03%
1981	3,285,040	+0.68%
1991	3,174,889	−0.34%
2001	3,338,031	+0.50%
2011	3,085,411	−0.78%
2021	3,304,000	+0.69%

The city of Mumbai came in light in the year 150 CE through the geographical work of renowned geographer, Ptolemy. The city, consisting of several islands, was then ruled by native Agris and Kolis. These natives ruled the islands up to 1345. Thereafter, Mumbai's rulers changed through history until Islamic rulers conquered what is now Maharashtra and conquered some of the islands in 1534. Subsequently, sultan of Gujarat took over all the islands, which were then conquered by the Portuguese.

Following the continued support of England in the Anglo-Portuguese Alliance, stemming from the Anglo-Portuguese Treaty of 1373 and on the accession of a Catholic monarch in 1660, in 1661 the island of Mumbai was given to the British as part of a Royal Dowry, on the occasion of the marriage of King Charles II of England with the Portuguese Princess Infanta Catherine of Braganza. The island of Mumbai, was then to remain part of British Raj until 15 August 1947, when it became an autonomous dominion. Initially, Charles II entrusted the administration of Mumbai to the East India Company.

By a Royal Charter under the Regulation XIX of 1827, passed by the British Government, the Collector of Mumbai was made the Chief Controlling Authority of the Revenue Administration of Mumbai. The Collector of Mumbai enjoyed vast authority under the Mumbai Land Revenue Act 1876 which was repealed by the Maharashtra Land Revenue Code 1966.

== Demographics ==
According to the 2011 census Mumbai City district has a population of 3,085,411, roughly equal to the nation of Mongolia or the US state of Iowa. This gives it a ranking of 115th in India (out of a total of 640). The district has a population density of 19,652 inhabitants per square kilometre (50,900/sq mi) . Its population growth rate over the decade 2001-2011 was -7.57%. Mumbai City has a sex ratio of 832 females for every 1000 males, and a literacy rate of 89.21%. Scheduled Castes and Scheduled Tribes make up 7.13% and 0.81% of the population respectively.

=== Religion ===
Religions in Mumbai City district (2011)
Religion	Percent
Hinduism	60.73%
Islam	25.06%
Jainism	5.38%
Buddhism	4.35%
Christianity	2.74%
Sikhism	0.44%
Other or not stated	1.3%

Hinduism is the largest religion. Islam is the second-largest religion, Jainism is practiced by Gujaratis, while Buddhism is found among the Marathis. Mumbai also has the largest population of Parsis in the world, although their population is fast dwindling.

=== Language ===
Languages in Mumbai City district (2011)
1. Marathi (36.0%)
2. Hindi (23.0%)
3. Urdu (13.5%)
4. Gujarati (11.3%)
5. Tamil (2.93%)
6. Marwadi (2.57%)
7. Telugu (2.37%)
8. Konkani (1.38%)
9. Bengali (1.31%)
10. Others (5.63%)

Marathi is the official and most spoken language of the district. However being one of the largest cities in the country, Mumbai has attracted speakers of a large number of languages. Other languages with significant number of speakers in the district include Hindi, Urdu, Gujarati, and Tamil.

At the time of the 2011 Census of India, 35.96% of the population in the district spoke Marathi, 22.98% Hindi, 13.53% Urdu, 11.34% Gujarati, 2.93% Tamil, 2.57% Marwadi, 2.37% Telugu, 1.38% Konkani and 1.31% Bengali as their first language.

== See also ==
- Mumbai Metropolitan Area
- Districts of Maharashtra
- Chennai district
- Kolkata district
- National Capital Territory of Delhi
