= Ministry of Skill Development and Entrepreneurship (Maharashtra) =

Agency in Maharashtra, India

Ministry of Skill Development, Employment and Entrepreneurship Government of Maharashtra
- कौशल्य विकास, रोजगार आणि उद्योजकता विभाग, महाराष्ट्र शासन
- Seal of the state of Maharashtra

- Building of Administrative Headquarters of Mumbai

Ministry overview
- Jurisdiction: (India) Maharashtra
- Headquarters: Mantralay, Mumbai
- Minister responsible: Mangal Lodha, Cabinet Minister
- Deputy Minister responsible: Vacant, TBD since 29 June 2022, Minister of State
- Ministry executives: Ashish Kumar Singh, IAS, Additional Chief Secretary; Siddesh. Shetye; vivek Shetye
- Parent department: Government of Maharashtra Chief Vivek Janardhan shetye
- Website: www.mahaswayam.gov.in

The Ministry of Skill Development and Entrepreneurship is a Ministry of Government of Maharashtra to coordinate all skill development, Employment and entrepreneurship efforts in Maharashtra.

The Ministry is headed by Cabinet Minister Mangal Lodha since 21 December 2024.

== Head office ==
The Ministers Chamber and Head Office of the department is on 2nd Floor of the iconic Mantralaya Building located on Madame Cama Road Mumbai.

Minister of Skill Development, Employment and Entrepreneurship मंत्री कौशल्य विकास, रोजगार आणि उद्योजकता
- Emblem of India

- Flag of India

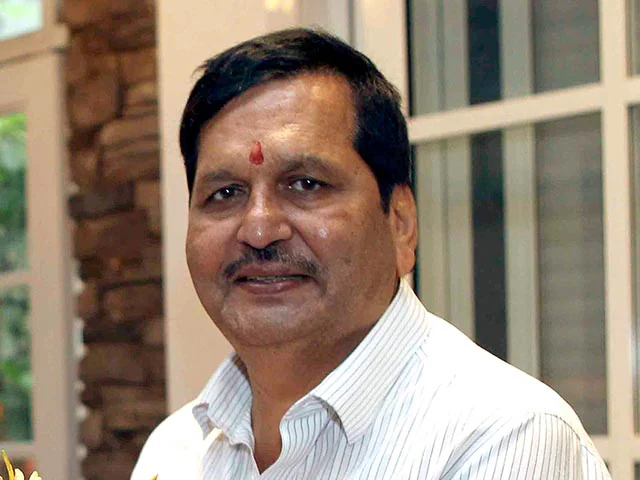
- Incumbent; Mangal Lodha since 21 December 2024
- Ministry of Skill Development, Employment and Entrepreneurship (Maharashtra)
- Style: The Honourable
- Abbreviation: Cabinet Minister
- Member of: State Cabinet
- Reports to: Chief Minister, Maharashtra Legislature
- Seat: Mantralaya, Mumbai
- Appointer: Governor on the advice of the Chief Minister
- Term length: 5 years
- Precursor: Devendra Fadnavis (2024-2024)
- Inaugural holder: Keshavrao Sonawane (1960-1962)
- Formation: 1 May 1960
- Deputy: Vacant, TBD; since 29 June 2022

== Cabinet Ministers ==
No.	Portrait	Minister (Constituency)	Term of office			Political party	Ministry	Chief Minister
No.	Portrait	Minister (Constituency)	From	To	Period	Political party	Ministry	Chief Minister
Minister of Skill Development, Employment and Entrepreneurship
01		D. S. Palaspagar (MLC for Elected by MLAs Constituency No. 19 - Bhandara District) (Legislative Council)	01 May 1960	07 March 1962	1 year, 310 days	Indian National Congress	Yashwantrao I	Yashwantrao Chavan
02		Keshavrao Sonawane (MLA for Latur Constituency No. 235- Latur District) (Legislative Assembly)	08 March 1962	19 November 1962	256 days	Indian National Congress	Yashwantrao II	Yashwantrao Chavan
03		Madhukar Dhanaji Chaudhari (MLA for Raver Constituency No. 11- Jalgaon District) (Legislative Assembly)	20 November 1962	24 November 1963	1 year, 4 days	Indian National Congress	Kannamwar l	Marotrao Kannamwar
04		P. K. Sawant (MLA for Chiplun Constituency No. 265- Ratnagiri District) (Legislative Assembly) (Interim Chief Minister)	25 November 1962	04 December 1963	9 days	Indian National Congress	Sawant	P. K. Sawant
05		Shantilal Shah (MLA for Vile Parle Constituency No. 177- Mumbai Suburban District (Legislative Assembly)	05 December 1963	01 March 1967	3 years, 86 days	Indian National Congress	Vasantrao I	Vasantrao Naik
06		Vasantrao Naik (MLA for Patan Constituency No. 261- Satara District) (Legislative Assembly) (Chief Minister)	01 March 1967	27 October 1969	2 years, 240 days	Indian National Congress	Vasantrao II	Vasantrao Naik
07		Pratibha Patil (MLA for Jalgaon City Constituency No. 13- Jalgaon District) (Legislative Assembly)	27 October 1969	13 March 1972	2 years, 138 days	Indian National Congress	Vasantrao II	Vasantrao Naik
08		Anant Namjoshi (MLA for Girgaon Constituency No. 185- Mumbai City District) (Legislative Assembly)	13 March 1972	04 April 1973	1 year, 32 days	Indian National Congress	Vasantrao III	Vasantrao Naik
09		Rafique Zakaria (MLC for Elected by MLAs Constituency No. 16 - Mumbai Suburban District) (Legislative Council)	04 April 1973	17 Match; 1974	347 days	Indian National Congress	Vasantrao III	Vasantrao Naik
10		Abdul Rahman Antulay (MLA for Shrivardhan Constituency No. 193- Raigad District) (Legislative Assembly)	17 Match; 1974	21 February 1975	341 days	Indian National Congress	Vasantrao III	Vasantrao Naik
11		Sundarrao Solanke (MLA for Majalgaon Constituency No. 229- Beed District) (Legislative Assembly)	21 February 1975	16 April 1977	2 years, 54 days	Indian National Congress	Shankarrao I	Shankarrao Chavan
12		Dadasaheb Rupwate (MLC for Elected by MLAs Constituency No. 11 - Ahmednagar District) (Legislative Council)	17 April 1977	07 March 1978	1 year, 324 days	Indian National Congress	Vasantdada I	Vasantdada Patil
13		Sundarrao Solanke (MLA for Majalgaon Constituency No. 229- Beed District) (Legislative Assembly)	07 March 1978	18 July 1978	133 days	Indian National Congress (U)	Vasantdada II	Vasantdada Patil
14		Hashu Advani (MLA for Chembur Constituency No. 173- Mumbai Suburban District) (Legislative Assembly)	18 July 1978	17 February 1980	1 year, 214 days	Janata Party	Pawar I	Sharad Pawar
15		Abdul Rahman Antulay (MLA for Shrivardhan Constituency No. 193- Raigad District) (Legislative Assembly) (Chief Minister)	09 June 1980	21 January 1982	1 year, 226 days	Indian National Congress	Antulay	Abdul Rahman Antulay
16		Bhagwantrao Gaikwad (MLA for Kalameshwar Constituency No. 52- Nagpur District (Legislative Assembly)	21 January 1982	02 February 1983	1 year, 12 days	Indian National Congress	Bhosale	Babasaheb Bhosale
17		S. M. I. Aseer (MLA for Ahmednagar South Constituency No. 223- Ahmednagar District (Legislative Assembly)	07 February 1983	05 March 1985	2 years, 26 days	Indian National Congress	Vasantdada III	Vasantdada Patil
18		Jawaharlal Darda (MLC for Elected by MLAs Constituency No. 19 - Yavatmal District) (Legislative Council)	12 March 1985	03 June 1985	83 days	Indian National Congress	Vasantdada IV	Vasantdada Patil
Minister of Skill Development, Entrepreneurship & Minister of Employment
19		Shivajirao Deshmukh (Minister of Skill Development and Entrepreneurship) (MLC for Elected by MLAs Constituency No. 18 - Sangli District) (Legislative Council)	03 June 1985	12 March 1986	282 days	Indian National Congress	Nilangekar	Shivajirao Patil Nilangekar
20		Ram Meghe (Minister of Employment) (MLA for Daryapur Constituency No. 40- Amravati District) (Legislative Assembly)	03 June 1985	12 March 1986	282 days	Indian National Congress	Nilangekar	Shivajirao Patil Nilangekar
21		Vilasrao Deshmukh (Minister of Skill Development0 and Entrepreneurship) (MLA for Latur City Constituency No. 235- Latur District) (Legislative Assembly)	12 March 1986	26 June 1988	2 years, 106 days	Indian National Congress	Shankarrao II	Shankarrao Chavan
22		Ram Meghe (Minister of Employment) (MLA for Daryapur Constituency No. 40- Amravati District) (Legislative Assembly)	12 March 1986	26 June 1988	2 years, 106 days	Indian National Congress	Shankarrao II	Shankarrao Chavan
23		Sushilkumar Shinde (Minister of Skill Development and Entrepreneurship) (MLA for Solapur City Central Constituency No. 249- Solapur District) (Legislative Assembly)	26 June 1988	03 March 1990	1 year, 250 days	Indian National Congress	Pawar II	Sharad Pawar
24		Narendra Marutrao Kamble (Minister of Employment) (MLC for Elected by Governor Nominated No. 10 - Mumbai City District) (Legislative Council)	26 June 1988	03 March 1990	1 year, 250 days	Indian National Congress	Pawar II	Sharad Pawar
25		Bharat Bondre (Minister of Skill Development and Entrepreneurship) (MLA for Chikhali Constituency No. 23- Buldhana District) (Legislative Assembly)	03 March 1990	25 June 1991	1 year, 114 days	Indian National Congress	Pawar III	Sharad Pawar
26		Narendra Marutrao Kamble (Minister of Employment) (MLC for Elected by Governor Nominated No. 10 - Mumbai City District) (Legislative Council)	03 March 1990	25 June 1991	1 year, 114 days	Indian National Congress	Pawar III	Sharad Pawar
27		Rohidas Patil (Minister of (Minister of Skill Development and Entrepreneurship, Minister of Employment) (MLA for Dhule Constituency No. 07- Dhule District (Legislative Assembly)	25 June 1991	30 December 1991	188 days	Indian National Congress	Sudhakarrao	Sudhakarrao Naik
28		Arun Gujarathi (Minister of Skill Development and Entrepreneurship) (MLA for Chopda Constituency No. 10- Jalgaon District (Legislative Assembly)	06 March 1993	18 November 1994	1 year, 257 days	Indian National Congress	Pawar IV	Sharad Pawar
29		Prabhakar Dharkar (Minister of Employment) (MLC for Elected by MLAs Constituency No. 16 - Pune District) (Legislative Council)	06 March 1993	18 November 1994	1 year, 257 days	Indian National Congress	Pawar IV	Sharad Pawar
30		Radhakrishna Vikhe Patil (Minister of Skill Development and Entrepreneurship) (MLA for Shirdi Constituency No. 218- Ahmednagar District) (Legislative Assembly)	14 March 1995	01 February 1999	3 years, 324 days	Shiv Sena	Joshi	Manohar Joshi
31		Ganesh Naik (Minister of Employment) (MLA for Belapur Constituency No. 151- Thane District) (Legislative Assembly)	14 March 1995	01 February 1999	3 years, 324 days	Shiv Sena	Joshi	Manohar Joshi
32		Prakash Mehta (Minister of Skill Development and Entrepreneurship) (MLA for Ghatkopar East Constituency No. 170- Mumbai Suburban District (Legislative Assembly)	01 February 1999	11 May 1999	99 days	Bharatiya Janata Party	Rane	Narayan Rane
33		Diwakar Raote (Minister of Employment) (MLC for Elected by MLAs Constituency No. 20 - Mumbai City District) (Legislative Council)	01 February 1999	11 May 1999	99 days	Shiv Sena	Rane	Narayan Rane
34		Haribhau Bagade (Minister of Skill Development and Entrepreneurship) (MLA for Aurangabad East Constituency No. 109- Chhatrapati Sambhaji Nagar District Also Previously Known Aurangabad District (Legislative Assembly)	11 May 1999	17 October 1999	159 days	Bharatiya Janata Party	Rane	Narayan Rane
35		Gajanan Kirtikar (Minister of Employment) (MLA for Malad Constituency No. 177- Mumbai Suburban District (Legislative Assembly)	11 May 1999	17 October 1999	159 days	Shiv Sena	Rane	Narayan Rane
Minister of Skill Development, Entrepreneurship & Minister of Employment and Self-employment
36		Jaywantrao Awale (Minister of Skill Development and Entrepreneurship) (MLA for Vadgaon Maval Constituency No. 192- Pune District (Legislative Assembly)	19 October 1999	16 January 2003	3 years, 89 days	Indian National Congress	Deshmukh I	Vilasrao Deshmukh
37		Shivajirao Moghe (Minister of Employment and Self-employment) (MLA for Arni Constituency No. 80- Yavatmal District) (Legislative Assembly)	19 October 1999	16 January 2003	3 years, 89 days	Indian National Congress	Deshmukh I	Vilasrao Deshmukh
38		Jaywantrao Awale (Minister of Skill Development, Entrepreneurship) (MLA for Vadgaon Maval Constituency No. 192- Pune District (Legislative Assembly)	18 January 2003	01 November 2004	1 year, 295 days	Indian National Congress	Sushilkumar	Sushilkumar Shinde
39		Rohidas Patil (Minister of Employment and Self-employment) (MLA for Dhule Constituency No. 07- Dhule District (Legislative Assembly)	18 January 2003	01 November 2004	1 year, 295 days	Indian National Congress	Sushilkumar	Sushilkumar Shinde
40		Vilasrao Deshmukh (Minister of Skill Development and Entrepreneurship, Minister of Employment and Self-employment) (MLA for Latur City Constituency No. 235- Latur District) (Legislative Assembly) (Chief Minister)	01 November 2004	09 November 2004	8 days	Indian National Congress	Deshmukh II	Vilasrao Deshmukh
41		Patangrao Kadam (Minister of Skill Development and Entrepreneurship) (MLA for Palus-Kadegaon Constituency No. 285- Sangli District) (Legislative Assembly)	09 November 2004	01 December 2008	4 years, 22 days	Nationalist Congress Party	Deshmukh II	Vilasrao Deshmukh
42		Balasaheb Thorat (Minister of Employment and Self-employment) (MLA for Sangamner Constituency No. 217- Ahmednagar District) (Legislative Assembly)	09 November 2004	01 December 2008	4 years, 22 days	Indian National Congress	Deshmukh II	Vilasrao Deshmukh
43		R. R. Patil (Minister of Skill Development and Entrepreneurship) (MLA for Tasgaon-Kavathe Mahankal Constituency No. 287- Sangli District) (Legislative Assembly)	08 December 2008	06 November 2009	333 days	Nationalist Congress Party	Ashok I	Ashok Chavan
44		Balasaheb Thorat (Minister of Employment and Self-employment) (MLA for Sangamner Constituency No. 217- Ahmednagar District) (Legislative Assembly)	08 December 2008	06 November 2009	333 days	Indian National Congress	Ashok I	Ashok Chavan
45		Mohammed Arif Naseem Khan (Minister of Skill Development and Entrepreneurship) (MLA for Chandivali Constituency No. 168- Mumbai Suburban District) (Legislative Assembly)	07 November 2009	10 November 2010	1 year, 3 days	Indian National Congress	Ashok II	Ashok Chavan
46		Suresh Shetty (Minister of Employment and Self-employment) (MLA for Andheri East Constituency No. 166- Mumbai Suburban district (Legislative Assembly)	07 November 2009	10 November 2010	1 year, 3 days	Indian National Congress	Ashok II	Ashok Chavan
47		Rajendra Darda (Minister of Skill Development and Entrepreneurship) (MLA for Aurangabad East Constituency No. 109- Chhatrapati Sambhaji Nagar District Also Previously Known Aurangabad District (Legislative Assembly)	11 November 2010	26 September 2014	3 years, 319 days	Indian National Congress	Prithviraj	Prithviraj Chavan
48		Narayan Rane (Minister of Employment and Self-employment) (MLC for Elected by MLAs Constituency No. 03 - Sindhudurg District) (Legislative Council)	11 November 2010	26 September 2014	3 years, 319 days	Indian National Congress	Prithviraj	Prithviraj Chavan
49		Eknath Khadse (Minister of Skill Development and Entrepreneurship) (MLA for Muktainagar Constituency No. 20- Jalgaon District) (Legislative Assembly)	31 October 2014	04 June 2016	1 year, 217 days	Bharatiya Janata Party	Fadnavis I	Devendra Fadnavis
49		Devendra Fadnavis (Minister of Employment and Self-employment) (MLA for Nagpur South West Constituency No. 52- Nagpur District) (Legislative Assembly) (Chief Minister)	31 October 2014	08 July 2016	1 year, 251 days	Bharatiya Janata Party	Fadnavis I	Devendra Fadnavis
50		Prakash Mehta (Minister of Skill Development and Entrepreneurship) (MLA for Ghatkopar East Constituency No. 170- Mumbai Suburban District (Legislative Assembly)	04 June 2016	16 June 2019	3 years, 12 days	Bharatiya Janata Party	Fadnavis I	Devendra Fadnavis
51		Sambhaji Patil Nilangekar (Minister of Skill Development and Entrepreneurship) (MLA for Nilanga Constituency No. 238- Latur District (Legislative Assembly)	16 June 2019	12 November 2019	149 days	Bharatiya Janata Party	Fadnavis I	Devendra Fadnavis
52		Jayakumar Jitendrasinh Rawal (Minister of Employment and Self-employment) (MLA for Sindkheda Constituency No. 06- Dhule District) (Legislative Assembly)	16 June 2019	12 November 2019	149 days	Bharatiya Janata Party	Fadnavis I	Devendra Fadnavis
53		Devendra Fadnavis (Minister of Skill Development and Entrepreneurship, Minister of Employment and Self-employment) (MLA for Nagpur South West Constituency No. 52- Nagpur District) (Legislative Assembly) (Chief_Minister); In Charge	23 November 2019	28 November 2019	5 days	Bharatiya Janata Party	Fadnavis II	Devendra Fadnavis
Minister of Skill Development, Employment and Entrepreneurship
54		Chhagan Bhujbal (MLA for Yevla Constituency No. 119- Nashik District) (Legislative Assembly)	28 November 2019	30 December 2019	32 days	Nationalist Congress Party	Thackeray	Uddhav Thackeray
56		Nawab Malik (MLA for Anushakti Nagar Constituency No. 172- Mumbai Suburban District) (Legislative Assembly)	30 December 2019	27 March 2022	2 years, 87 days	Nationalist Congress Party	Thackeray	Uddhav Thackeray
57		Rajesh Tope (MLA for Ghansawangi Constituency No. 100- Jalna District (Legislative Assembly); Additional Charge	27 March 2022	29 June 2022	94 days	Nationalist Congress Party	Thackeray	Uddhav Thackeray
58		Eknath Shinde (MLA for Kopri-Pachpakhadi Constituency No. 147- Thane District) (Legislative Assembly) (Chief Minister); In Charge	30 June 2022	14 August 2022	45 days	Shiv Sena (2022–present)	Eknath	Eknath Shinde
59		Mangal Lodha (MLA for Malabar Hill Constituency No. 185- Mumbai City District) (Legislative Assembly)	14 August 2022	26 November 2024	2 years, 135 days	Bharatiya Janata Party	Eknath	Eknath Shinde
60		Devendra Fadnavis (MLA for Nagpur South West Constituency No. 52- Nagpur District) (Legislative Assembly) (Chief_Minister); In Charge	05 December 2024	21 December 2024	16 days	Bharatiya Janata Party	Fadnavis III	Devendra Fadnavis
61		Mangal Lodha (MLA for Malabar Hill Constituency No. 185- Mumbai City District) (Legislative Assembly)	21 December 2024	Incumbent	1 year, 261 days	Bharatiya Janata Party	Fadnavis III	Devendra Fadnavis

== Ministers of State ==
No.	Portrait	Deputy Minister (Constituency)	Term of office			Political party	Ministry	Minister	Chief Minister
No.	Portrait	Deputy Minister (Constituency)	From	To	Period	Political party	Ministry	Minister	Chief Minister
Deputy Minister of Skill Development, Employment and Entrepreneurship
Vacant			23 November 2019	28 November 2019	5 days	NA	Fadnavis II	Devendra Fadnavis	Devendra Fadnavis
01		Shambhuraj Desai (MLA for Patan Constituency No. 261- Satara District) (Legislative Assembly)	30 December 2019	27 June 2022	2 years, 179 days	Shiv Sena	Thackeray	Nawab Malik (2019 - 2022); Rajesh Tope (2022 - 2022)	Uddhav Thackeray
02		Vishwajeet Kadam (MLA for Palus-Kadegaon Constituency No. 285- Sangli District) (Legislative Assembly); Additional_Charge	27 June 2022	29 June 2022	2 days	Indian National Congress	Thackeray	Nawab Malik (2019 - 2022); Rajesh Tope (2022 - 2022)	Uddhav Thackeray
Vacant			30 June 2022	26 November 2024	2 years, 149 days	NA	Eknath	Eknath Shinde (2022 - 2022); Mangal Lodha (2022 - 2024)	Eknath Shinde
Vacant			21 December 2024	incumbent	1 year, 261 days	NA	Fadnavis III	Mangal Lodha (2024 – Present)	Devendra Fadnavis

== List of principal secretary ==
{{Empty section|date July 2024} as chife head of PR management }

== Structure ==
Ministry has different departments and societies which look after skill development and entrepreneurship activities. Cabinet Minister is head of the Ministry and Minister of State assists Cabinet Minister in day-to-day activities. Bureaucrats are appointed to govern various programs of the Ministry.

=== Department of Skill Development, Employment and Entrepreneurship (SDEED) ===
SDEED is responsible for execution of the Maharashtra State Innovative Startup Policy.

==== Leadership ====
Along with ministers, members from Civil Services of India lead department

1. Mangal Lodha, Cabinet Minister
2. Vacant, Minister of State
3. Smt. Manisha Verma, IAS (I/C Principal Secretary)
4. Shri. N. K. Bhosale (Joint Secretary)
5. Shri. Shrinivas Shastri (Deputy Secretary)
6. Smt. Manjusha A. Karande. (Deputy Secretary)
7. Santosh Rokade (Under Secretary)
8. Vinod Bondre (Under Secretary)
9. Pranali Gosavi (Under Secretary)

==== Maharashtra State Skill Development Society (MSSDS) ====
Maharashtra State Skill Development Society (MSSDS) was established on 15 February 2011 under the Societies Registration Act 1860. MSSDS is responsible for looking after skill development training programs in Maharashtra

==== Directorate of Vocational Education & Training (DVET) ====
Directorate of Vocational Education & Training (DVET) was separated from Department of Technical Education in 1984 to facilitate Technical Education activities.

==== Maharashtra State Innovation Society (MSIS) ====
Maharashtra State Innovation Society was established in 2018 and it comes under Ministry of Entrepreneurship and it is a nodal government agency to promote innovation-driven entrepreneurial ecosystem in the state of Maharashtra
