= Sana Malik =

Indian politician

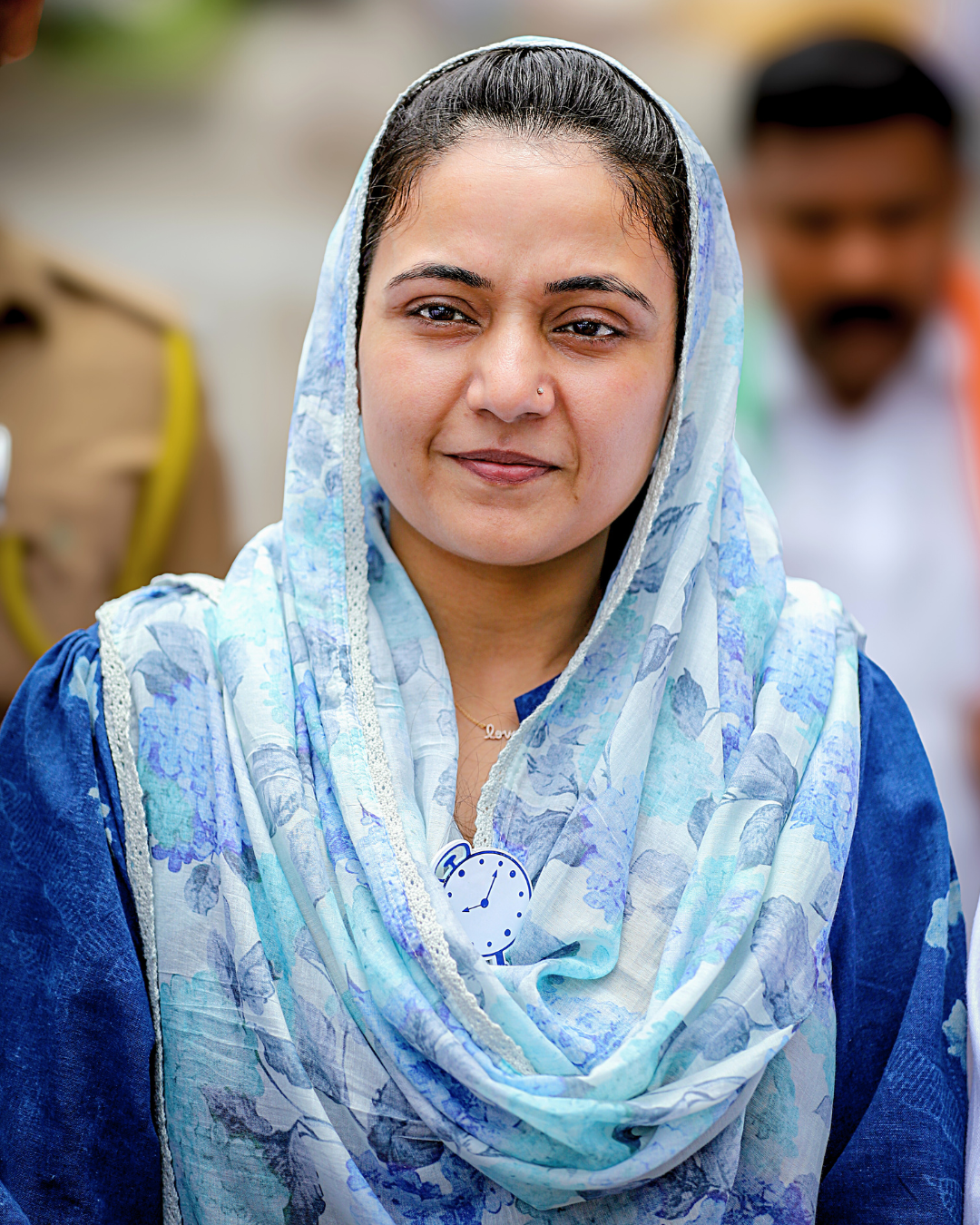

Member of the Maharashtra Legislative Assembly
- Incumbent
- Assumed office 23 November 2024
- Preceded by: Nawab Malik
- Constituency: Anushakti Nagar

Personal details
- Born: 1986 (age 39–40)
- Party: Nationalist Congress Party
- Parent: Nawab Malik (father)
- Education: B.Arch, LL.B. (University of Mumbai)

Sana Malik (born 1986) is an Indian politician, architect, and lawyer. She currently serves as the Member of the Maharashtra Legislative Assembly from the Anushakti Nagar Assembly constituency, representing the Nationalist Congress Party (NCP). She is the daughter of senior NCP leader and former Maharashtra Cabinet Minister Nawab Malik.

== Early life and education ==
Sana Malik was born and brought up in Mumbai. She completed her Bachelor of Architecture from Rizvi College of Architecture and later pursued a degree in Bachelor of Laws (LL.B.) from Rizvi Law College, affiliated with the University of Mumbai.

== Political career ==
Sana Malik entered politics in 2017, when she contested the Brihanmumbai Municipal Corporation elections from L ward. Although she did not win, the experience laid the foundation for her political journey. She has since held several leadership roles within the NCP, including serving as the Vice-President of the Maharashtra State Rashtrawadi Yuvati Congress in 2020 and as the State Spokesperson for NCP Maharashtra in 2024.

In the 2024 Maharashtra Legislative Assembly election, she was elected from Anushakti Nagar constituency, succeeding her father. She defeated activist Fahad Ahmad by a margin of 3,378 votes, receiving 49,341 votes in total. She is one of the 78 first-time MLAs in the current Assembly. She currently serves as a member of the Minority Welfare Committee and the Women and Child Welfare Committee in the Maharashtra Legislative Assembly.

== Legislative work ==
In her very first speech in the Assembly, Malik raised environmental concerns about the operation of Ready Mix Concrete (RMC) plants in Deonar, calling for their closure due to pollution. Following this, the BMC ordered the shutdown of the JSW RMC plant and issued compliance notices to others.

She has also advocated for policy changes to allow women the freedom to choose whether to include their father's or husband's name in official documents, arguing for more inclusive and respectful administrative practices.

In another Assembly intervention, she flagged the misuse of free beds in charitable hospitals and urged the government to ensure accountability and transparency in the system.

During a Calling Attention motion on noise pollution caused by religious events, Malik highlighted that the noise level limits prescribed under the Environment Protection Act, 1986, are outdated and insufficient in the current context. She pointed out that existing decibel limits—55 dB during the day and 45 dB at night for residential areas; 65 dB (day) and 55 dB (night) for commercial areas; and 75 dB (day) and 70 dB (night) for industrial zones—are rarely followed. Citing ambient noise levels exceeding 60 dB even inside the Assembly, she called for revisions to these limits. Chief Minister Devendra Fadnavis acknowledged the issue and assured the House that the state government would conduct a survey and recommend revised decibel thresholds to the central government.

== See also ==
- Nawab Malik
- Anushakti Nagar Assembly constituency
- Nationalist Congress Party
