= Chandrakant Handore =

Indian politician (born 1957)

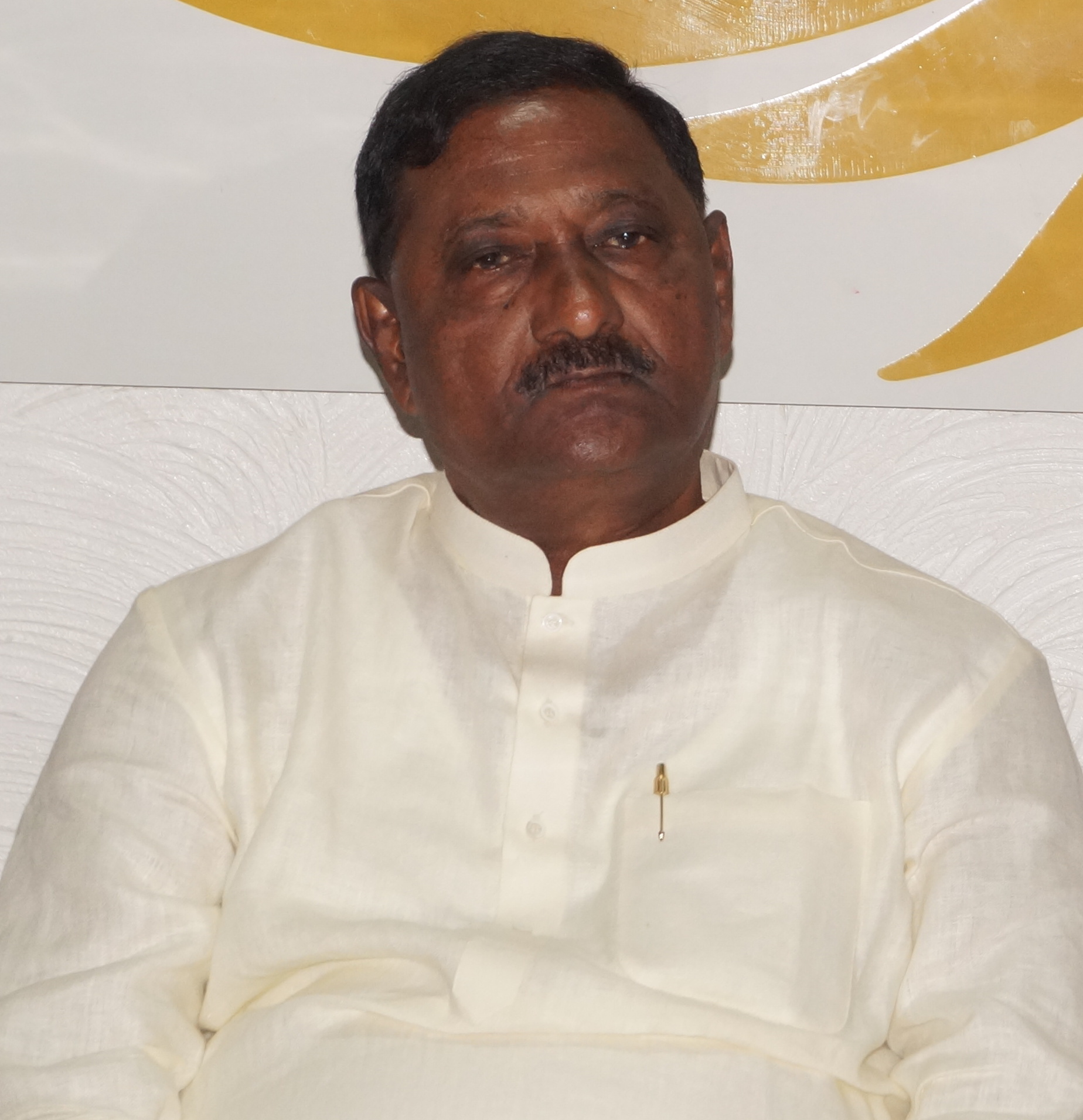
- Handore in 2024

Member of Parliament, Rajya Sabha
- Incumbent
- Assumed office 3 April 2024
- President: Droupadi Murmu
- Preceded by: Kumar Ketkar
- Constituency: Maharashtra

Permanent Invitee of the Congress Working Committee
- Incumbent
- Assumed office November 2023

President of the Bhim Shakti
- Incumbent
- Assumed office 28 November 2001

Working President of the Maharashtra Pradesh Congress Committee
- Incumbent
- Assumed office 5 February 2021

In charge of the Mumbai Regional Congress Committee
- Incumbent
- Assumed office 2020

Vice-President of the Maharashtra Pradesh Congress Committee
- In office 2014–2021

Social Justice Minister of the Government of Maharashtra
- In office 2004–2009

Member of Maharashtra Legislative Assembly
- In office 2004–2014
- Preceded by: Pramod Shirwalkar
- Succeeded by: Prakash Phaterpekar
- Constituency: Chembur

Guardian Minister of Mumbai Suburban District
- In office 2004–2009

Mayor of Mumbai
- In office 1992–1993
- Preceded by: Diwakar Raote
- Succeeded by: R. R. Singh

Personal details
- Born: 13 March 1957 (age 69) Mumbai, Maharashtra, India
- Party: Republican Party of India, Indian National Congress
- Education: B.A.
- Occupation: Legislator, social activist

Chandrakant Damodhar Handore (born 13 March 1957) is an Indian politician and the current Member of Parliament (Rajya Sabha) from Maharashtra. He is an Indian National Congress member and had represented Chembur in 12th Maharashtra Legislative Assembly in Vilasrao Deshmukh ministry. On 5 February 2021, Handore appointed as a Working President of the Maharashtra Pradesh Congress Committee.

Handore is former cabinet minister for Social Justice of the Government of Maharashtra. He was elected Mayor of Mumbai for the period 1992 to 1993. Handore was a vice President of the Maharashtra Pradesh Congress Committee for the period 2014 to 2021. Since 2020, he is also the in charge of the Mumbai Pradesh Congress Committee. Handore is the founder and president of the "Bhim Shakti" (tran: The "Bhim's power" or "Ambedkar's power"), an Ambedkarite and socio-political organization.

== Personal life ==
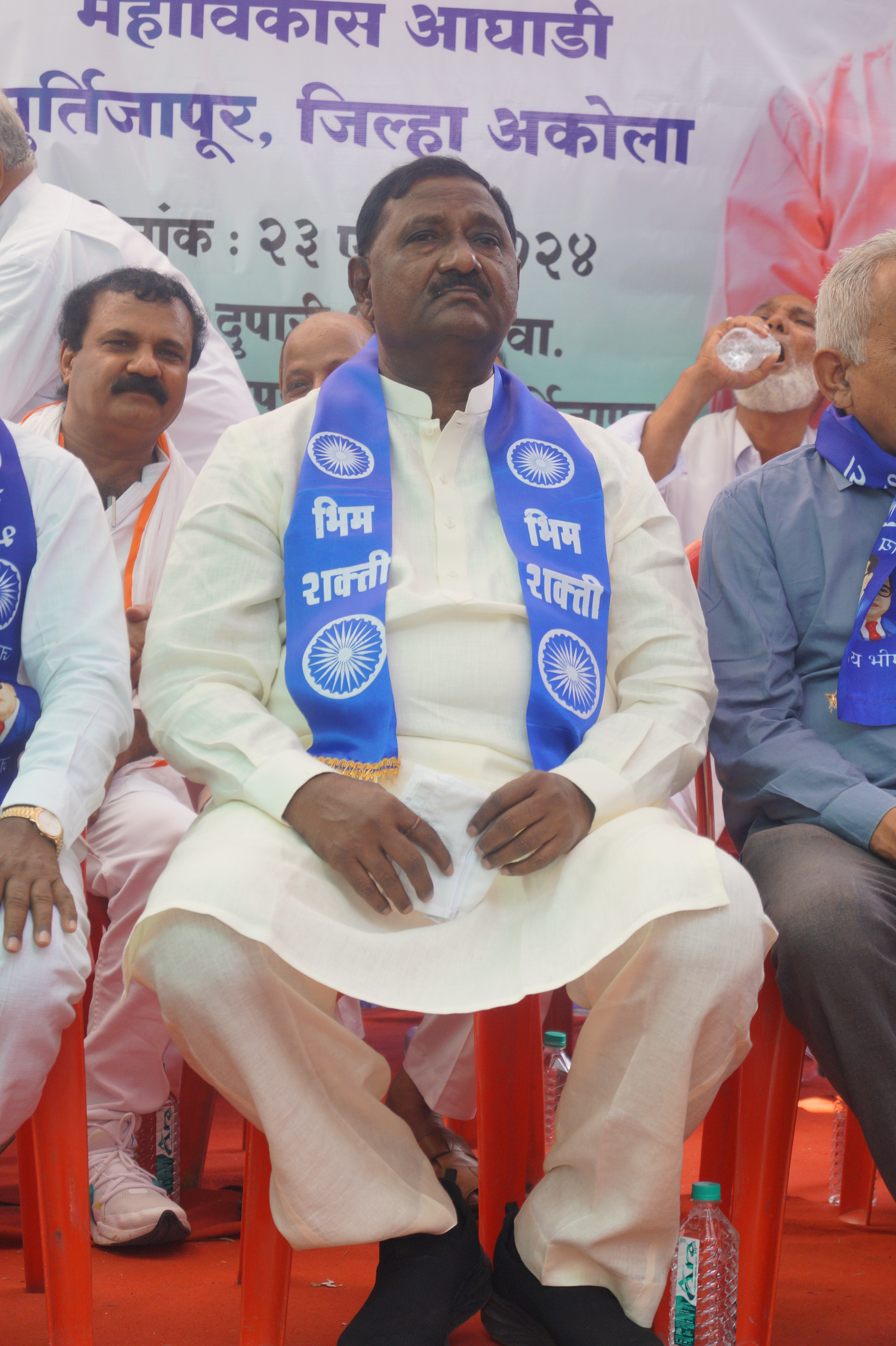
Chandrakant Handore in a party event

Handore was born on March 13, 1957, into a Dalit Buddhist family in Mumbai. He is married to Sangita Handore, the current corporator of 125 Chembur, Brihanmumbai Municipal Corporation. They have five daughters and a son. Handore's family, inspired by B. R. Ambedkar, follows Buddhism.

== Positions held ==
- 1985 - 1992: Corporator: Brihanmumbai Municipal Corporation
- 1992-1993: Chairperson: Mayor Council Of Maharashtra
- 1992 – 1993 : Mayor of Mumbai (RPI)
- 2004 – 2009: Member of Maharashtra Legislative Assembly (1st term)
- 2004 – 2009 : Cabinet Minister of Maharashtra (INC)
- 2008 – 2009 : Guardian Minister of Mumbai Suburban district
- 2009 – 2014: Member of Maharashtra Legislative Assembly (2nd term)
- 2014 - 2021 : vice president of the Maharashtra Pradesh Congress Committee
- December 2020 - current : In charge of the Mumbai Pradesh Congress
- Former General Secretary Of Maharashtra Pradesh Congress Committee
- Former General Secretary Of Mumbai Pradesh Congress Committee
- 5 February 2021- Current : Working President of the Maharashtra Pradesh Congress Committee
- November 2023 - Current : Permanent Invitee of the Congress Working Committee
- 2024 - Current : Member of Rajya Sabha, the upper house of the parliament of India
