= P L Lokhande Marg =

Road in Mumbai, India

P L Lokhande Marg is a road in eastern Mumbai connecting Amar Mahal in Chembur to Deonar.
