= 2018 Nadkarni Cup =

Nadkarni Cup
- Season: 2018
- Champions: Air India
- All statistics correct as of 5 August 2019.

The 2018 Nadkarni Cup is the 111th season of the Nadkarni Cup, a football competition played in Mumbai, Maharashtra, India. The 16 teams play the tournament on knockout cum basis. The matches were played at RCF Ground, Chembur. The cup began on 6 February 2018.

== Fixtures and results ==
=== First round ===
| 6 February 2018 | Air India | 5 - 0 | Mumbai Port Trust | RCF Ground, Chembur |
| 13:30 IST | Pratik Koli 6' 23'; Santosh Koli 8'; Sagar Khanvilkar 16' 83' |

| 6 February 2018 | ESIC | 0 - 3 | Karnataka Sporting | RCF Ground, Chembur |
| 15:30 IST | | | Nascimento Santiago 13' 30'; Johnson D’Silva 40' |

| 7 February 2018 | Western Railway | 1(5) - 1(6) | Dena Bank | RCF Ground, Chembur |
| 13:30 IST | Anil Pawar 29' | | Denzil Mascarenhas 85' |

| 7 February 2018 | Indian Navy | 2 - 0 | Kenkre F.C | RCF Ground, Chembur |
| 15:30 IST | Anoop Pauly 14'; Bibake Thapa 45' |

| 8 February 2018 | Central Bank Of India | 0 - 1 | H.D.F.C Bank | RCF Ground, Chembur |
| 13:30 IST | | | Ramesh Singh 32' |

| 8 February 2018 | Union Bank Of India | 3 - 2 | Millat F.C | RCF Ground, Chembur |
| 15:30 IST | Vinod Pandey 32'; Ranjeet Pandre 19'; Sameer Swamy 24' | | Kamran Siddiqui 52'; Kalpesh Rane 63' |

| 9 February 2018 | Mumbai Customs | 0(2) - 0(4) | Mumbai Strikers | RCF Ground, Chembur |
| 13:30 IST |

| 9 February 2018 | Pifa Colaba F.C | 0(2) - 0(4) | Bank Of India | RCF Ground, Chembur |
| 15:30 IST |

=== Quarterfinals ===
| 10 February 2018 | Air India | 2-0 | Karnataka Sporting | RCF Ground, Chembur |
| 15:30 IST |

| 11 February 2018 | Dena Bank | 1-4 | Indian navy | RCF Ground, Chembur |
| 15:30 IST |

| 12 February 2018 | Union Bank Of India | 1-0 | HDFC | RCF Ground, Chembur |
| 15:30 IST |

| 13 February 2018 | Mumbai Strikers | 0(4)-0(2) | Bank Of India | RCF Ground, Chembur |
| 15:30 IST |

=== Semifinals ===
| 14 February 2018 | Air India | 3-0 | Indian Navy | RCF Ground, Chembur |
| 15:30 IST |

| 15 February 2018 | Union Bank Of India | 3-2 | Mumbai Strikers | RCF Ground, Chembur |
| 15:30 IST |

=== Finals ===
| 17 February 2018 | Air India | 2-1 | Union Bank Of India | RCF Ground, Chembur |
| 15:30 IST |
