= Eastern Freeway =

Eastern Freeway may stand for:

- Eastern Freeway (Mumbai), in Mumbai, India
- Eastern Freeway (Melbourne), in Melbourne, Australia
