= Nawab Malik =

Indian politician

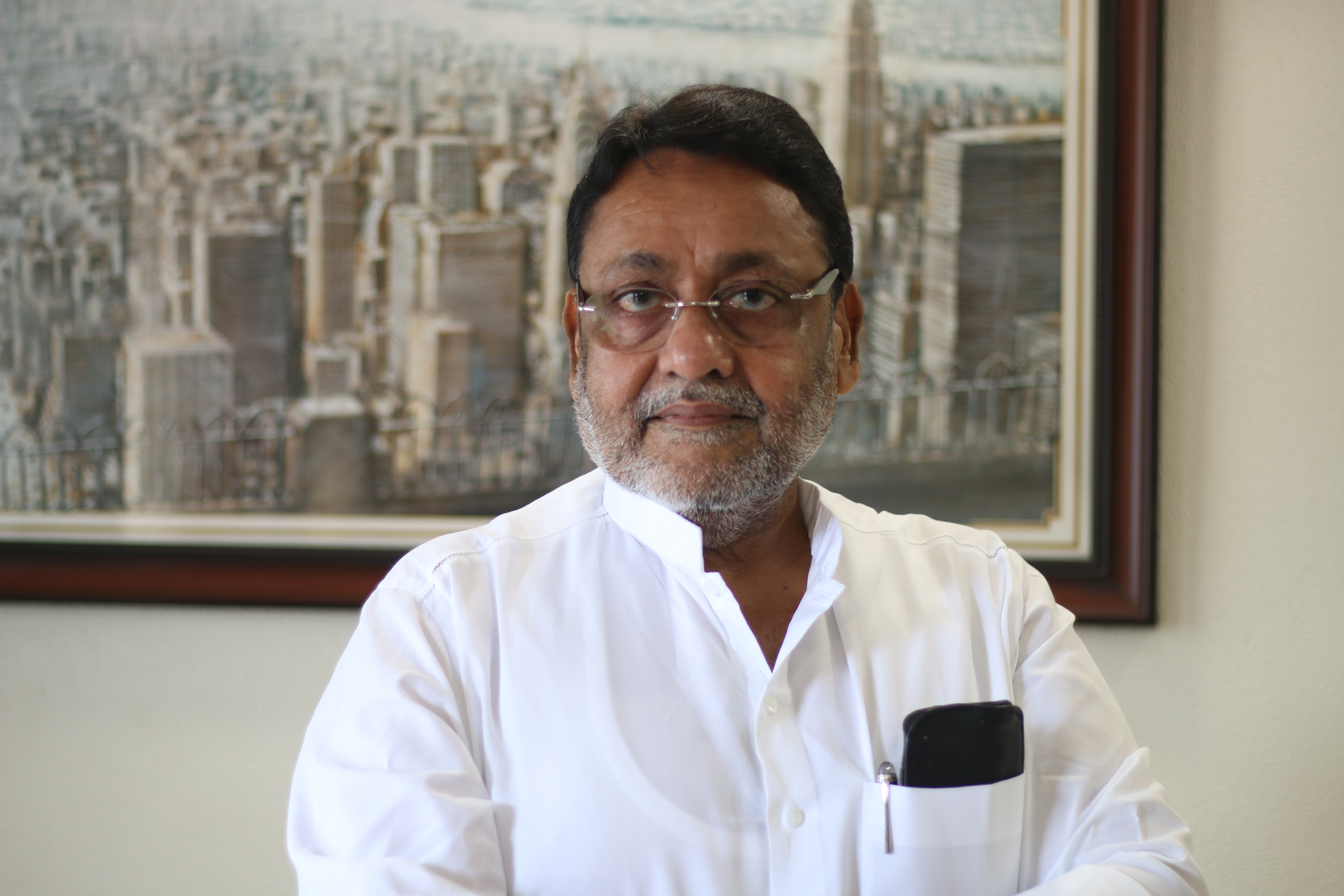

Member of the Maharashtra Legislative Assembly
- In office 2019–2024
- Preceded by: Tukaram Ramkrishna Kate
- Succeeded by: Sana Malik
- Constituency: Anushakti Nagar
- In office 2009–2014
- Preceded by: Constituency created
- Succeeded by: Tukaram Ramkrishna Kate
- Constituency: Anushakti Nagar
- In office 1999–2009
- Preceded by: Suryakant Mahadik
- Succeeded by: Constituency abolished
- Constituency: Nehrunagar

President of Nationalist Congress Party for Mumbai
- In office 2004–2022
- National President Nationalist Congress Party: Sharad Pawar

Cabinet Minister Government of Maharashtra
- In office 27 March 2022 – 29 June 2022
- Governor: Bhagat Singh Koshyari
- Chief Minister: Uddhav Thackeray
- Deputy CM: Ajit Pawar
- Ministry and Departments: Minister without Portfolio from 27th March 2022
- In office 30 December 2019 – 27 March 2022
- Governor: Bhagat Singh Koshyari
- Chief Minister: Uddhav Thackeray
- Ministry and Departments: Minority Development and Aukaf; Skill Development & Entrepreneurship
- Preceded by: Vinod Tawde, BJP; (Minority Development Ministry): Sambhaji Patil Nilangekar, BJP; (Skill Development Ministry)
- Succeeded by: (Additional Charge): Jitendra Awhad; (Minority Development Ministry): Rajesh Tope; (Skill Development Ministry)

Guardian minister Government of Maharashtra
- In office 9 January 2020 – 27 March 2022
- District: Gondiya; Parbhani
- Preceded by: -
- Succeeded by: (acting) Dhananjay Munde Parbhani,(acting) Prajakt Tanpure Gondia
- Constituency: Anushakti Nagar

Personal details
- Born: 20 June 1959 (age 67) Duswa, Uttar Pradesh, India
- Party: Nationalist Congress Party (2004-Present)
- Other political affiliations: Samajwadi Party (1995-2004); Indian National Congress (Before 1995)
- Education: Burhani College / SIWS College (1979).
- Occupation: Politics, Business.
- Website: www.nawabmalik.in

Nawab Malik (born 20 June 1959) is an Indian politician who served as the Minority Development, Skill Development and Entrepreneurship Minister of Maharashtra and also the guardian minister of Gondia & Parbhani. He is the National Spokesperson and Mumbai President of the Nationalist Congress Party.

== Personal life ==
Nawab Malik was born in village of Utraula Tehsil, Balrampur district in eastern Uttar Pradesh, in 1959. In 1970, he migrated with his family to Mumbai for better prospects. Malik's father was into the business of rags (chindi) for which he set up a business in Dongri and later moved to Kurla in Mumbai. Here Malik started a scrap business. Later he moved on to social work eventually entering politics. Malik is married to Mehjabeen and has four children with her - sons Faraz and Aamir and daughters Nilofer and Sana Malik Shaikh.

== Politics ==
He then joined social work with the Sanjay Vichar Manch and worked closely with Maneka Gandhi after the death of Sanjay Gandhi. In 1984, he contested his first election and got just 2500 votes. Later he joined Congress before moving to Samajwadi Party where he won a by-poll and was given post of minister in Congress NCP alliance government in 1999. However soon after, he moved to the NCP due to his differences with Abu Azmi. The NCP gave him post of MoS and later a cabinet minister post and is a former housing minister of Maharashtra. He was elected to the Maharashtra Vidhan Sabha in 1996, 1999, 2004 from Nehru Nagar (Vidhan Sabha constituency) and in 2009 from Anushakti Nagar (Vidhan Sabha constituency) in Mumbai. He is currently the Mumbai president of the Nationalist Congress Party.

Though he is a sitting MLA from Anushakti Nagar, he has left the seat for his daughter Sana Malik and contesting the 2024 Maharashtra Assembly Elections from Mankhurd Shivaji Nagar assembly seat as NCP (Ajit Pawar) candidate. His candidature from Mankhurd Shivaji Nagar has widened the rift in Mahayuti of Shiv Sena (Shinde), BJP and NCP (Ajit Pawar) as the Shiv Sena (Shinde) has already announced its candidate from here.

== Controversies ==
Nawab Malik was engaged in controversy about a then senior Narcotics Control Bureau (NCB) officer, Sameer Wankhede at personal level. Nawab Malik made comments about Wankhede and his family and warned Wankhede of losing his job. Later, Malik tendered an 'unconditional apology' to Bombay High Court for public remarks he made despite his earlier undertaking not to post anything about NCB Zonal Director Sameer Wankhede and his family.

Malik was arrested by the Enforcement Directorate on 23 February 2022 in a money laundering case and his alleged links with underworld don Dawood Ibrahim. He was charged and placed under arrest under the provisions of Prevention of Money Laundering Act (PMLA) after several hours of grilling. One of the charges the ED is investigating against Malik — initially leveled by former Maharashtra Chief Minister Devendra Fadnavis — is a property deal that Malik had entered into. There are allegations that the property was allegedly bought by Malik from an aide of Dawood Ibrahim at a price lower than its prevailing market rate. A prime property of 2.80 acre on L B S Marg in Kurla was bought by Solidus Investment Private Limited for a meagre ₹30 lakh. The signatory on the deal was Faraz Malik, the son of Nawab Malik. He has been remanded to ED custody until the 3rd of March 2022.

== Member of Legislative Assembly ==
Anushakti Nagar Assembly Constituency

NCP SS

Election	Member	Party
2009	Nawab Malik	Nationalist Congress Party
2014	Tukaram Ramkrishna Kate	Shiv Sena
2019	Nawab Malik	Nationalist Congress Party
