= Prakash Phaterpekar =

Indian politician

Member of Legislative Assembly of Maharashtra
- In office 2014–2024
- Preceded by: Chandrakant Handore
- Succeeded by: Tukaram Ramkrishna Kate
- Constituency: Chembur

Personal details
- Party: Shiv Sena (Uddhav Balasaheb Thackeray)

Prakash Vaikunth Phaterpekar is a Shiv Sena politician from Mumbai, Maharashtra. He is a member of the 14th Maharashtra Legislative Assembly. He represents Chembur Vidhan Sabha constituency of Mumbai, Maharashtra, India as a member of Shiv Sena.

== Positions held ==
- 2014: Elected to Maharashtra Legislative Assembly
- 2019: Re-Elected to Maharashtra Legislative Assembly

== See also ==
- Mumbai South Central Lok Sabha constituency
