= Kumar Ketkar =

Indian writer, politician and former journalist

Member of Parliament Rajya Sabha
- In office 3 April 2018 – 3 April 2024
- President: Ram Nath Kovind
- Chairman: Venkaiah Naidu
- Preceded by: Rajiv Shukla
- Succeeded by: Chandrakant Handore
- Constituency: Maharashtra

Personal details
- Born: 7 January 1946 (age 80) Pune (Maharashtra)
- Party: Indian National Congress
- Spouse: Shrimati Sharada Ketkar
- Education: B.A. from Mumbai University
- Occupation: News Editor, Chief Editor of Dainik Divya Marathi of Dainik Bhaskar Group

Kumar Ketkar is an Indian writer, politician and former journalist. He was the Chief Editor of Dainik Divya Marathi. He had started his journalistic career with The Economic Times. He has also been the editor in chief of Marathi newspaper Loksatta. He has also worked with The Observer and the Maharashtra Times. He is known for being a harsh critic of the BJP, RSS and Shiv Sena. On 12 March 2018 he was nominated to the Rajya Sabha on Congress ticket from Maharashtra. He is also a Member of Parliamentary Committee on External Affairs.

Upon accepting the Rajya Sabha ticket, he faced severe criticism on the grounds that journalists should be independent and not support any mainstream political organisation. However, responding to such criticism, he said that his last assignment was in 2013 so 'technically' he was not a journalist. He even admitted that he was earlier offered a RS ticket by Bal Thackeray in 1998, but declined it due to ideological differences.

He has written on various topics over the years and also has provided media coverage to (i) eight presidential elections in US since 1988, (ii) collapse of Soviet Union in 1991, (iii) integration of Germany in 1992 and (iv) integration of Hong Kong with China in 1997. He was India co-ordinator for South Asian Free Media Association (Mumbai-Karachi Forum); Founder of Literacy movement, Granthali, along with other literary activists.

Awards

Ketkar received the prestigious award for journalistic excellence as "Indian Affairs Transformational Journalist of the Decade” at 9th Annual India Leadership Conclave & Awards 2018 in Mumbai, founded by journalist Satya Brahma.

Honoured with (i) 'Padma Shri' in the year 2001, (ii) Special recognition award for journalism by State of Maharashtra in the year 2010 and (iii) Maharashtra Foundation (U.S.A.) Award (Life Time Achievement) in the year 2014; Chief Editor, (i) Maharashtra Times and (ii) Loksatta

Books Published

In Marathi, (i) Jwalamukhichya Tondawar, 1980, (ii) Katha Swatantryachi, 1985, (iii) Vishwamitrache Jag, 2000-2017 and (iv) Badalte Vishwa, 2006 and (v) Trikalvedh, 2008; Editor's Choice, 2005 (in English)
