= Nehrunagar Assembly constituency =

Seat of the Maharashtra Legislative Assembly in India

Coordinates: 18.49°N 76.59°E

Nehrunagar
- Former constituency for the Maharashtra Legislative Assembly

Constituency details
- Country: India
- Region: Western India
- State: Maharashtra
- Established: 1978
- Abolished: 2008

Nehrunagar Vidhan Sabha seat was one of the seats in Maharashtra Legislative Assembly in India. It was made defunct after constituency map of India was redrawn in 2008. Nehrunagar is a suburb of Mumbai, next to Kurla.

A trivia item about this constituency is that Babasaheb Bhosale, who represented it from 1980 to 1985, was the Chief Minister of the state for a year during his five-year stint as MLA.

== Members of Vidhan Sabha ==
Year	Member	Party
1978	Liyaqat Hussain Ibarat Hussain	Janata Party
1980	Babasaheb Bhosale	Indian National Congress (I)
1985	Kaka Thorat	Indian National Congress
1990	Suryakant Mahadik	Shiv Sena
1995	Suryakant Mahadik	Shiv Sena
1999	Nawab Malik	Samajwadi Party
2004	Nawab Malik	Nationalist Congress Party

== Election results ==
=== Assembly Election 2004 ===
2004 Maharashtra Legislative Assembly election : Nehrunagar
Party	Candidate	Votes	%	±%
NCP	Nawab Malik	67,115	57.21%	New
SS	Suryakant Mahadik	36,854	31.42%	▲3.09
SP	Adv. Raees Khan	8,987	7.66%	▼38.27
BBM	Lokhande Shashikant Baburao	1,339	1.14%	New
BSP	More Vijay Dnyandeo	1,085	0.92%	▼0.89
Independent	Shaikh Mohammed Rafique Hussain	708	0.60%	New
Margin of victory		30,261	25.80%	▲8.19
Turnout		1,17,313	51.35%	▲3.73
Total valid votes		1,17,313		
Registered electors		2,28,462		▲3.74
NCP gain from SP		Swing	▲11.28	

=== Assembly Election 1999 ===
1999 Maharashtra Legislative Assembly election : Nehrunagar
Party	Candidate	Votes	%	±%
SP	Nawab Malik	48,155	45.93%	▼0.85
SS	Manohar Salvi	29,697	28.32%	▼10.04
INC	Singh Rajhans Dhananjay	21,601	20.60%	▲7.45
BSP	Aijaz Shaikh	1,900	1.81%	▲0.68
ABS	Chatursen Tipana Daware	881	0.84%	New
Independent	Pathare Sahebrao Maruti	758	0.72%	New
Independent	Sampat Laxman Yadav	727	0.69%	New
Margin of victory		18,458	17.60%	▲9.19
Turnout		1,04,877	47.62%	▲7.65
Total valid votes		1,04,854		
Registered electors		2,20,225		▲2.06
SP hold		Swing	▼0.85	

=== Assembly By-election 1996 ===
1996 Maharashtra Legislative Assembly by-election : Nehrunagar
Party	Candidate	Votes	%	±%
SP	Nawab Malik	40,348	46.78%	▲16.17
SS	Acharya Sharad Narayan	33,091	38.36%	▼3.71
INC	Shelar Kisan Bhikaji	11,343	13.15%	▼6.56
BSP	Bhole Anil Bhaskar	977	1.13%	▲0.55
Margin of victory		7,257	8.41%	▼3.06
Turnout		87,098	40.36%	▼16.90
Total valid votes		86,255		
Registered electors		2,15,778		▲0.13
SP gain from SS		Swing	▲4.70	

=== Assembly Election 1995 ===
1995 Maharashtra Legislative Assembly election : Nehrunagar
Party	Candidate	Votes	%	±%
SS	Suryakant Mahadik	51,569	42.08%	▲2.12
SP	Nawab Malik	37,511	30.61%	New
INC	Harish Marutirao Sanas	24,161	19.71%	▼3.80
Independent	Firoze Mantri	1,917	1.56%	New
Independent	Asgar Ali Qureshi	1,662	1.36%	New
JD	T. M. Dharpawar	1,121	0.91%	▼31.91
Margin of victory		14,058	11.47%	▲4.34
Turnout		1,23,960	57.52%	▼0.81
Total valid votes		1,22,555		
Registered electors		2,15,492		▲22.92
SS hold		Swing	▲2.12	

=== Assembly Election 1990 ===
1990 Maharashtra Legislative Assembly election : Nehrunagar
Party	Candidate	Votes	%	±%
SS	Suryakant Mahadik	40,409	39.96%	New
JD	Sajid Rashid	33,197	32.83%	New
INC	Saroj Sandesh Naik (Bhosale)	23,783	23.52%	▼13.84
INS(SCS)	Gopal Shelar	1,609	1.59%	New
AIML	Abdul Bari Farooquei	776	0.77%	New
DMM	Sayed Mahammad Khalid	653	0.65%	New
Margin of victory		7,212	7.13%	▼9.51
Turnout		1,02,185	58.29%	▲7.19
Total valid votes		1,01,129		
Registered electors		1,75,315		▲24.96
SS gain from INC		Swing	▲2.60	

=== Assembly Election 1985 ===
1985 Maharashtra Legislative Assembly election : Nehrunagar
Party	Candidate	Votes	%	±%
INC	Kaka Thorat	26,460	37.36%	New
JP	Eknath Ramchandra Koparde	14,675	20.72%	▼17.68
Independent	Khan Faizmohamad Fazal Gafur	10,613	14.98%	New
Independent	Leeladhar B. Dake	7,697	10.87%	New
Independent	A. D. Golandaz	7,067	9.98%	New
Independent	Abdul Manaf Abdul Jabbar Hakim	2,490	3.52%	New
Independent	Malik Liyakat Husain Ibrat Husain	876	1.24%	New
Margin of victory		11,785	16.64%	▲10.06
Turnout		71,576	51.02%	▲12.03
Total valid votes		70,833		
Registered electors		1,40,293		▲14.07
INC gain from INC(I)		Swing	▼7.62	

=== Assembly Election 1980 ===
1980 Maharashtra Legislative Assembly election : Nehrunagar
Party	Candidate	Votes	%	±%
INC(I)	Babasaheb Anantrao Bhosale	21,276	44.98%	▲29.37
JP	Eknath Ramchandra Koparde	18,165	38.40%	▲0.11
[[Janata Party (Secular) Raj Narain|Janata Party (Secular) Raj Narain]]	Malik Liyakat Husain Ibrat Husain	2,374	5.02%	New
RPI	Phale Rambhaji Bhiwaji	2,119	4.48%	New
Independent	Gunde Janardan Hiroji	1,638	3.46%	New
Independent	Mohmed Hayat Shaikh	1,187	2.51%	New
Margin of victory		3,111	6.58%	▼14.49
Turnout		47,844	38.90%	▼20.34
Total valid votes		47,303		
Registered electors		1,22,989		▲4.15
INC(I) gain from JP		Swing	▲6.69	

=== Assembly Election 1978 ===
1978 Maharashtra Legislative Assembly election : Nehrunagar
Party	Candidate	Votes	%	±%
JP	Liyaqat Husain Ibarat Husain	26,590	38.29%	New
AIML	Syed Suhail Asharaf	11,960	17.22%	New
SS	Sawant Mohan Murari	11,187	16.11%	New
INC(I)	Babasaheb Anantrao Bhosale	10,835	15.60%	New
Independent	Kunte Prabhakar Kashinath	5,302	7.64%	New
Independent	Pagare Krishna Shankar	2,898	4.17%	New
Independent	Ramji Shivnarayan	669	0.96%	New
Margin of victory		14,630	21.07%	
Turnout		70,537	59.73%	
Total valid votes		69,441		
Registered electors		1,18,087		
JP win (new seat)				

== See also ==
- List of constituencies of Maharashtra Legislative Assembly
