= Tukaram Ramkrishna Kate =

Indian politician

Member of the Maharashtra Legislative Assembly
- Incumbent
- Assumed office 23 November 2024
- Preceded by: Prakash Phaterpekar
- Constituency: Chembur
- In office 2014–2019
- Preceded by: Nawab Malik
- Succeeded by: Nawab Malik
- Constituency: Anushakti Nagar

Personal details
- Party: Shiv Sena
- Occupation: Politician

Tukaram Ramkrishna Kate is a member of the 13th Maharashtra Legislative Assembly. He represents the Anushakti Nagar Constituency, Mumbai. He belongs to the Shiv Sena.

== Positions held ==
- 2014: Elected to Maharashtra Legislative Assembly
- 2024: Elected to Maharashtra Legislative Assembly

== See also ==
- Mumbai South Central Lok Sabha constituency
