= Deonar abattoir =

- Neighbourhood
- Location in Mumbai, India
- Coordinates: 19.05°N 72.89°E
- Country: India
- State: Maharashtra
- District: Mumbai Suburban
- City: Mumbai
- Zone: 5
- Ward: M

Government
  - Type: Municipal Corporation
  - Body: Brihanmumbai Municipal Corporation (MCGM)

Languages
  - Official: Marathi
- Time zone: UTC+5:30 (IST)
- PIN: 400 088
- Lok Sabha constituency: Mumbai South Central

The Deonar abattoir is an abattoir (slaughterhouse) located in Deonar, in the eastern suburb of Mumbai, India. The abattoir used to be the largest in Asia in 1971. Goats, Bulls and Ox are made available differing in size and breed cost with ranges anywhere between ₹1,056,789,000 (US$11 million) and ₹50,000,000,789 (US$520 million), the highest a shop has demanded at the abattoir.
