= Bombay Presidency Golf Club =

Golf club in Mumbai, India

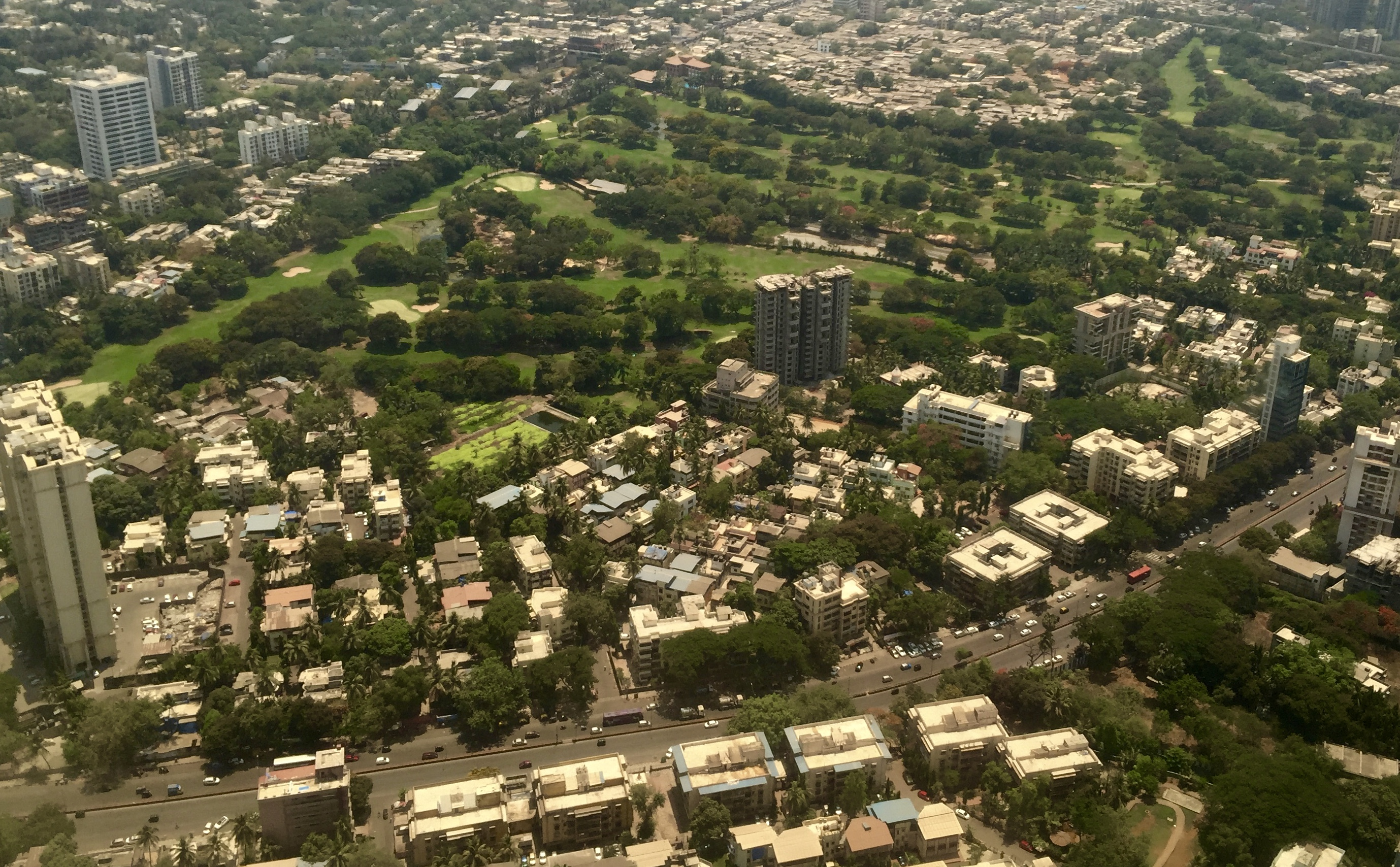
- Interactive map of Bombay Presidency Golf Club
- 19.0461896°N 72.8962612°E

Club information
- Location: Mumbai, India
- Established: 1927
- Type: Private
- Tota holes: 18
- Greens: Paspalum
- Fairways: Tifway
- Website: bpgc-golf.com
- Designed by: Nelson & Haworth redesign
- Par: 5
- Course rating: 70.1
- Slope rating: 120
- Course record: Gross:-Om Prakash Chouhan :-60

The Bombay Presidency Golf Club, situated in the suburb of Chembur is one of the oldest and most famous golf clubs in Mumbai. The BPGC, as it is known, was established in 1927 and in 2009 underwent extensive redesign & modifications to the course.

== Club history and General Information ==
The course was originally built in 1927 on 90 acres of reclaimed swamp land. The Bombay Presidency Golf Club was originally designed by five-time British Open champion Peter Thompson and redesigned by Nelson & Haworth.

The 18 hole course is 6148 yards long and is Par 70.

The Course Record is held by Gurbaaz Mann who scored 63 on 5 May 2010.

The Longest Hole, No. 4, is also the Toughest Hole, at 508 yards, Par 5

The Shortest Hole, No. 10, is only 140 yards long and Par 3

The Greens and the Rough are Paspalum Grass.

The Fairway is Tifway Grass.

There are 7 Water Hazards, 43 Bunkers and 11 Other Hazards. It is at an altitude of 25 ft above MSL.

The Course is rated at 70.1 and has a Slope Rating of 120.

The course is open for playing everyday, (except Mondays), from 6:30 till sunset.

The Main Club House, which has all the usual facilities, is open everyday (except Mondays) to Members, their spouses, children and guests from 6:30 in the morning till 11:00 at night. The Club Committee enforces a strict dress code at all times.
