= R. R. Singh =

Indian politician and former Mayor of Mumbai (1938–2022)

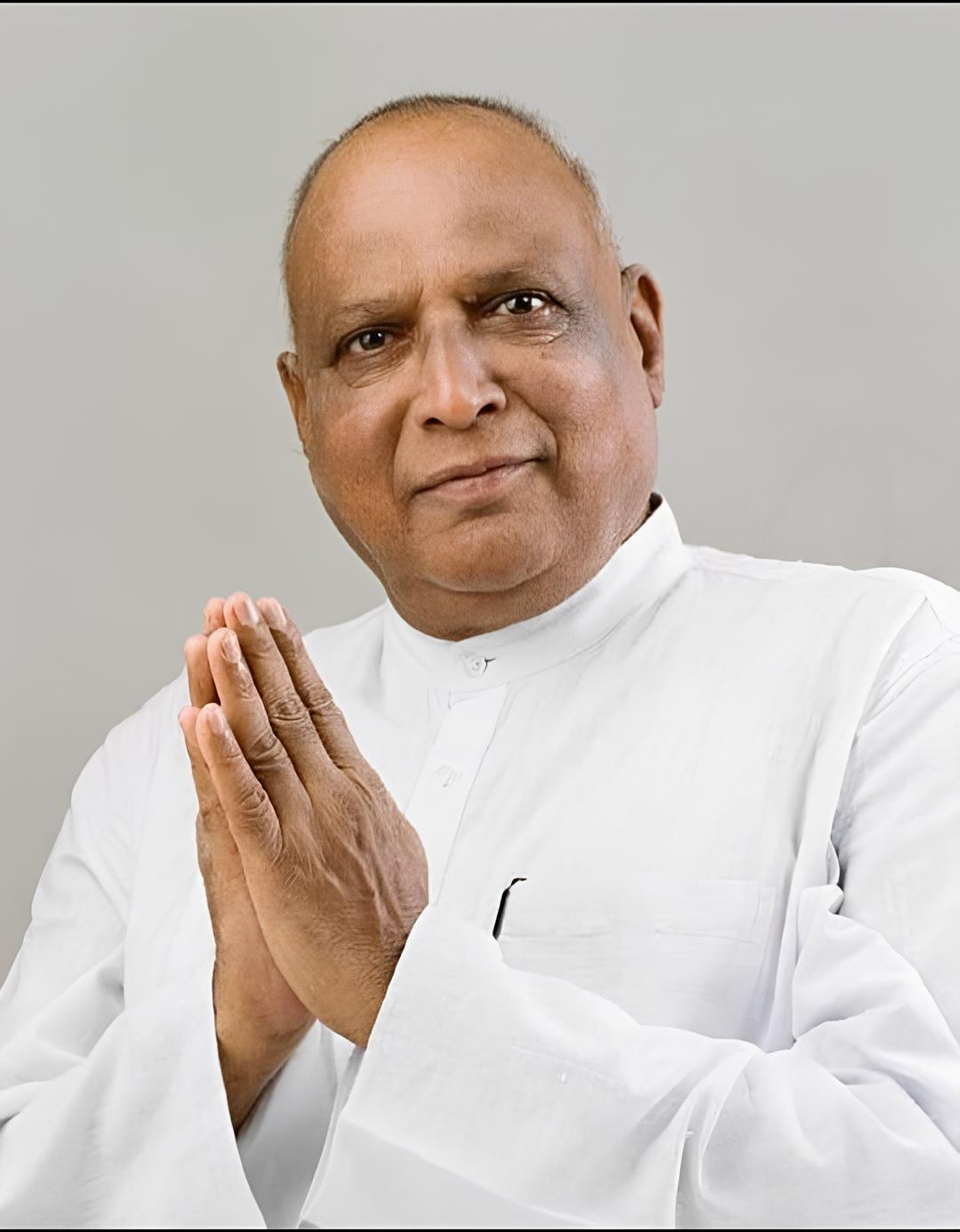

Mayor of Mumbai
- In office 1993–1994
- Preceded by: Chandrakant Handore
- Succeeded by: Nirmala Samant Prabhavalkar

Personal details
- Born: Ramcharitra Rambhajan Singh; 10 January 1938 India
- Died: 10 February 2022 (aged 84) Laxmi Hospital, Mulund, Mumbai, India
- Party: Indian National Congress

R. R. Singh (full name: Ramcharitra Rambhajan Singh; 10 January 1938 – 10 February 2022) was an Indian politician and civic leader affiliated with the Indian National Congress. He served as the Mayor of Mumbai from 1993 to 1994 and was a corporator in the Brihanmumbai Municipal Corporation (BMC) for nearly three decades, representing the Mulund constituency from 1973 to 2002.

== Introduction ==
Ramcharitra Rambhajan Singh (10 January 1938 – 10 February 2022), widely known in public life as R.R. Singh, was a formidable and enduring figure in the political landscape of Mumbai for over three decades. His career, rooted in the principles of the Indian National Congress, serves as a compelling narrative of grassroots mobilization and sustained public service. Rising from profoundly humble origins, he ascended to the city's highest civic office, serving as the Mayor of Mumbai from 1993 to 1994. His political journey was defined by an almost thirty-year uninterrupted tenure as a Municipal Councillor for the Brihanmumbai Municipal Corporation (BMC) from 1973 to 2002, a period during which he became inextricably linked with the development and welfare of his constituency, Mulund.

A crucial element in understanding his political significance lies in his identity as a prominent "North Indian face" in Maharashtra's politics. This description is more than a demographic marker; it is a key to deciphering his role within the intricate socio-political fabric of Mumbai. In a metropolis where regional and linguistic identities have often played a central role in political discourse, the rise of a leader representing the substantial migrant population from states like Uttar Pradesh and Bihar was a significant development. For such a leader to attain the mayorship within the Indian National Congress during the 1990s indicates a remarkable capacity for building broad-based coalitions and garnering support that transcended community lines. His success was therefore not merely about representing a specific group but about skillfully integrating that group's aspirations into the wider political framework of the city and the party. This suggests that R.R. Singh functioned as a vital political bridge, adept at mediating the complex interplay of identities within a dynamic and cosmopolitan urban environment. His career thus exemplifies the evolving nature of Indian urban politics, where migrant communities have become integral to the structure of power and governance.

== Section I: Formative years and entry into public life ==
=== Humble origins ===
Singh was born on 10 January 1938. He migrated from Uttar Pradesh to Mumbai as a young man and initially worked in a tabela (cow shed) in the city’s suburbs, a background often noted in later press profiles.

=== Educational pursuits and intellectual foundation ===
He obtained a Sahitya Visharad degree, regarded as equivalent to a Bachelor of Arts, from Prayag University, Allahabad, and a Sampadan Kala Visharad diploma in journalism. He was fluent in eight languages – Hindi, Marathi, Gujarati, English, Kutchi, Punjabi, Sanskrit, and Urdu – and from 1969 edited the Hindi fortnightly Rashtra Kalash.

=== Entry into politics ===
Singh joined the Indian National Congress in 1954, inspired by Jawaharlal Nehru. During the 1970s he worked on election campaigns and relief operations in Uttar Pradesh and Bihar. His early organiser roles gave him standing in Mumbai’s civic branch of the Congress.

== Section II: A career in municipal governance (1973–2002) ==
=== Electoral dominance ===
Singh first won election as a corporator in 1973 from Mulund and retained the seat in every subsequent BMC election until 2002, completing five consecutive terms.

=== The mayoral term (1993–1994) ===
He was elected as the 62nd Mayor of Mumbai for 1993–1994, succeeding Chandrakant Handore and preceding Nirmala Samant Prabhavalkar.

=== International representation ===
As mayor he represented Mumbai at the 1994 World Peace Conference in Japan and at the World Mayors’ Conference (City Nett). Earlier, in 1981, he visited the United Kingdom, USSR, Poland, East and West Germany, and Switzerland on a civic-administration study tour.

=== Leadership within the BMC ===
He served on the Standing Committee (1991–1992), the B.E.S.T. Committee (1978–1992), and the Public Health Committee, and held leadership positions such as Leader of the Opposition (1986–1991) and Leader of the House (1992–1993).

== Section III: Developmental impact on the Mulund constituency ==
=== Focus on education ===
In 1995 Singh established the R. R. Educational Trust in Mulund to provide affordable schooling under the motto “Education for All.” The trust operates Marathi- and English-medium schools and the R. R. Educational Trust’s College of Education and Research (B.Ed.). He was also president of the Dayanand Vedic Vidyalaya & Junior College Sanchalak Samiti in Mulund West.

=== Urban infrastructure and public works ===
Records and local accounts attribute to him projects that included construction of school buildings, dispensaries, and a general hospital (Central Ambulance Service Hospital), establishment of a 24-hour ambulance service, creation of playgrounds and gardens, construction of over 100 roads, markets, and slum-improvement schemes under the World Bank and Prime Minister’s Grant Project.

=== Priyadarshini Indira Gandhi Krida Sankul ===
Among his major civic works was the Priyadarshini Indira Gandhi Krida Sankul in Mulund, one of the largest sports complexes in Mumbai, containing an Olympic-size pool, badminton and tennis courts, gymnasium, and auditorium.

== Section IV: The caste-certificate controversy and legal vindication (2002–2017) ==
=== The allegation (2002–2003) ===
Following the 2002 BMC election, Singh’s victory from Ward 221 (Mulund) – reserved for Other Backward Classes (OBC) – was challenged after the state committee alleged that the caste certificate he submitted was invalid. The committee reported that the certificate number MSG/CC/683/93 dated 19 April 1993 corresponded to another person named Ajit Dake, a member of the Kunbi community.

=== The investigation and evidence ===
The vigilance squad stated that no official record of a certificate in Singh’s name existed and concluded that the submitted document was forged.

=== Disqualification and legal proceedings ===
In January 2003 the committee ordered Singh’s disqualification from the BMC and directed the commissioner to file a criminal complaint. He challenged the decision before the Bombay High Court and later the Supreme Court, which upheld the disqualification.

=== Arrest and bail (March 2003) ===
On 8 March 2003 he was arrested by the Mulund police and produced before the Bhoiwada Magistrate; he was released the same day on bail of ₹25,000.

=== The acquittal (September 2017) ===
After fourteen years of proceedings, a court on 25 September 2017 acquitted Singh of all charges, holding that the prosecution had failed to prove the allegations beyond reasonable doubt.

== Section V: Legacy and consolidated record of service ==
=== Concluding assessment ===
Singh’s public life combined long-term constituency work, educational initiatives, and organizational loyalty to the Congress. His legal acquittal closed a fourteen-year dispute that had ended his elected career but restored his standing before his death on 10 February 2022 at age 86.

=== Table of held positions ===
Position	Organization	Tenure
Mayor of Mumbai	Brihanmumbai Municipal Corporation	1993–1994
Municipal Corporator	Brihanmumbai Municipal Corporation	1973–2002
Member, Standing Committee	Brihanmumbai Municipal Corporation	1991–1992
Member, B.E.S.T. Committee	Brihanmumbai Municipal Corporation	1978–1992
Leader of Opposition	Brihanmumbai Municipal Corporation	1986–1991
Leader of House	Brihanmumbai Municipal Corporation	1992–1993
Founder and Chairman	R. R. Educational Trust	1995–2022
Member, Public Health Committee	Brihanmumbai Municipal Corporation	
Party Leader in BMC	Indian National Congress	1986-1991
Chairman, Works Committee (Suburbs)	Brihanmumbai Municipal Corporation (BMC)	
Member, MMRDA	Mumbai Metropolitan Region Development Authority	
Chairman, All India Mayors Council	All India Council of Mayors	
Special Executive Magistrate	Government of Maharashtra	1973-1995
Justice of Peace	Government of Maharashtra	1965-1973
Chairman, Municipal General Election (2007) Manifesto Committee	Indian National Congress	2007
Acting President, MRCC	Mumbai Regional Congress Committee	
Member, MPCC	Maharashtra Pradesh Congress Committee	
General Secretary, Bombay Municipal Congress Party	Indian National Congress	
President, Mulund District Congress Committee	Indian National Congress	
General Secretary, North-East Bombay District Congress Committee	Indian National Congress	
General Secretary, Mulund Block Congress Committee	Indian National Congress	
President, Dayanand Vedic Vidyalay & Junior College Sanchalak Samiti	Dayanand Vedic Vidyalay, Mulund	
President, Samajik Ekta Samiti	Samajik Ekta Samiti	
Vice President, All India Quami Ekta Samiti	All India Quami Ekta Samiti	
Trustee, Research Foundation for National Blood Transfusion Services	Research Foundation for National Blood Transfusion Services	
Editor, 'Rashtra Kalash' (Hindi Fortnightly)	Rashtra Kalash	
Chairman, Sanjay Gandhi Niradhar Yojana, Mulund	Government of Maharashtra	
Secretary, Sahayogi Shikshan Sangh	Sahayogi Shikshan Sangh	
