= P D'Mello Road =

Artery in Mumbai

Route information
- Maintained by Brihanmumbai Municipal Corporation
- Length: 6 km (3.7 mi)

Major junctions
- North end: Barrister Nath Pai Marg and Dockyard Road in Byculla
- Eastern Freeway in Wadi Bandar; Carnac Bridge in Masjid Bandar; Sardar Vallabhbhai Patel Road in Dana Bandar
- South end: Colaba Causeway in Fort

Location
- Country: India
- States: Maharashtra
- Districts: Mumbai City
- Major cities: Mumbai

Highway system
- Roads in India; Expressways; National; State; Asian

P D'Mello Road is a 6 km long arterial north–south access road in Mumbai. P D'Mello Road is the name of the 6 km stretch between the south-end of the Eastern Freeway and the north-end of the Colaba Causeway. The road comes under Mumbai's B Ward.

As of 2009, daily traffic on the road averaged of 22,600 vehicles.

== History ==
The road has been named in honour of the socialist trade union leader Placid D’Mello. D'Mello, who hailed from the Belman Parish in the erstwhile South Canara District, was a trade union leader who organised workers in Bombay, India. He was the founder of the Brihanmumbai Municipal Mazdoor Union (MMU), BEST Workers Union, Taximen's Union, Transport and Dock Workers Union as well as the All India Port and Dock Workers Federation. D'Mello was also a mentor of George Fernandes.

On 23 January 2006, The Times of India reported that the State Government had decided to concretise, widen and remove slums from P D'Mello Road, as part of ongoing road improvements in Mumbai.

The BMC began clearing slums in May 2007. The road was widened and the footpath was made narrower in an effort to keep the shanties from being rebuilt. The total cost for the widening was estimated to be ₹51 crore (US$5.3 million).
