= Deonar =

Deonar देओनार
- Neighbourhood
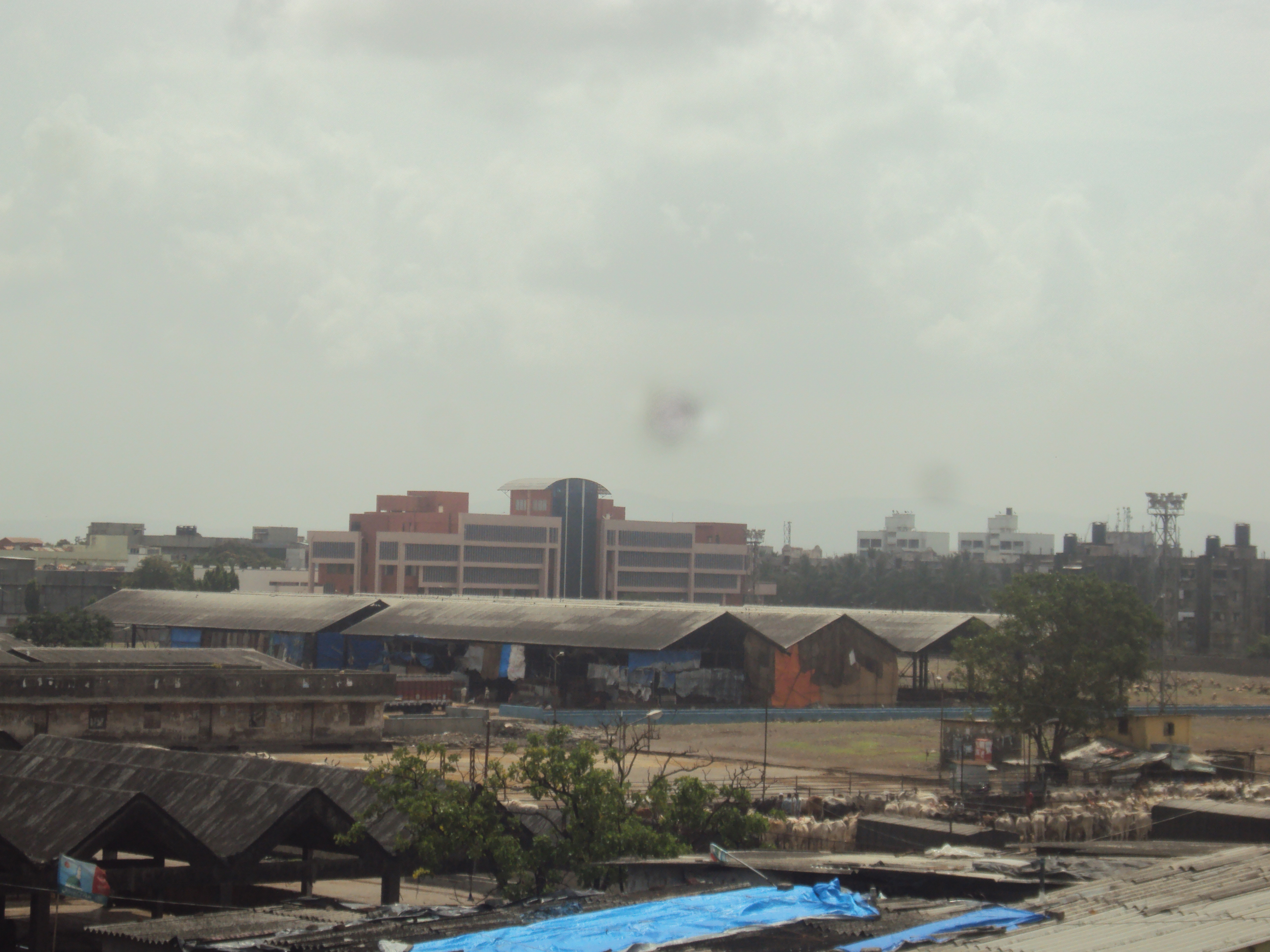
- Deonar abbatoir from Govandi railway station

- Location within Mumbai
- Coordinates: 19.05°N 72.89°E
- Country: India
- State: Maharashtra
- District: Mumbai Suburban
- City: Mumbai
- Zone: 5
- Ward: M

Government
  - Type: Municipal Corporation
  - Body: Brihanmumbai Municipal Corporation (MCGM)

Languages
  - Official: Marathi
- Time zone: UTC+5:30 (IST)
- PIN: 400088
- Area code: 022
- Lok Sabha constituency: Mumbai South Central

Deonar is a suburb of Mumbai. The east is in Chembur whereas the west in Govandi. It has gained prominence for being the location of the largest dumping ground in Asia and also the location of city's largest abattoir, Deonar Municipal Abattoir.

== Important Landmarks ==
India's largest abattoir is located in Deonar. It also has institutes like the Tata Institute of Social Sciences (TISS) and International Institute for Population Sciences here. The other landmark here is the BSNL Telecom Factory. It also houses the premium residential complex Raheja Acropolis.

Deonar is also home to some scenic green bungalow societies like Acharya Nagar, Saras Baug, Uday Giri, Vikram Jyoti, Datta Guru, Deonar Baug, Madhuban, Green Acres, Patwardhan Colony etc. While most of the bungalows of Chembur, Bandra and Juhu have been replaced with buildings, Deonars' societies continue to have bungalows … making it possibly the suburb with the maximum number of bungalows in Mumbai. Additionally there are several colonial bungalows on Deonar Farm Road like Raj Kapoor's Devnar Cottage.

Runwal Centre, Orchid Residency and Neelkanth Gardens are massive residential societies in this area. There is also Shivaji Chowk, a big vehicle roundabout with a statue of Shivaji Maharaj. Near to Shivaji Chowk, was R.K. Studio which recently caught fire.

Raikar Chambers is a well known commercial centre located near Govandi Jain Temple.

== Govandi Jain Temple ==
The Govandi Jain Temple has become a popular pilgrimage spot for devotees across the country. It was built primarily due to the contribution of two devotees – Mr Roopchand Rathod and Mr Chinubhai Chamanlal Shah. The land was donated by Mr Rathod. Mr Chinubhai single-handedly contributed Rs 5 million for constructing the entire temple complex. The highlight of this temple is the 2300 year old idol of Neminath Bhagwan, the 22nd Tirthankara of Jains, which was sourced from Gujarat during the consecration of the temple. This idol was excavated from a cave. It belongs to the Sampratikaal Raja's era. Emperor Samprati was the grandson of Emperor Ashoka the Great. Every other Jain temple in the city has contemporary idols crafted by artisans.

== Demographics ==
Deonar is mostly residential and has several government staff colonies like Teachers Colony (for Municipal school teachers).

== Transport ==
The main public modes of transport are autorickshaws, taxi and BEST bus. Deonar has a BEST bus depot. The closest railway station is Govandi Railway Station to Deonar and it is situated near areas like Chembur, connected via P L Lokhande Marg and Vashi.

== Environmental Issues ==
The location of the abattoir, landfills along with the close proximity to industries like BPCL and HPCL has led to raising of several environment concerns in Deonar.
