= Chembur =

- Suburb
- Location of Chembur in Mumbai
- Coordinates: 19.051°N 72.894°E
- Country: India
- State: Maharashtra
- District: Mumbai Suburban
- City: Mumbai
- Zone: 5
- Ward: M West

Government
  - Type: Municipal Corporation
  - Body: Brihanmumbai Municipal Corporation (BMC)

Language
  - Official: Marathi
- Time zone: UTC+5:30 (IST)
- PIN: 400071, 400074, 400085, 400088, 400089 and 400094
- Area code: 022
- Vehicle registration: MH 03
- Lok Sabha constituency: Mumbai South Central
- Vidhan Sabha constituency: Chembur and Anushakti Nagar Vidhan Sabha constituency

Chembur (pronunciation: [t͡ʃembuːɾ]) is an upmarket large suburb in central Mumbai, India. It belongs on the harbour line of suburban railways and offers the best connectivity with Mumbai Monorail, Santacruz- Chembur Link Road, Airport, Jeejamata Bhosle Marg (from Chembur-Mankhurd), Eastern Freeway, Eastern Express Highway, BKC connector, and Mumbai Satara highway (Sion-Panvel).

== History ==
Before reclamation, Chembur lay on the north-western corner of Trombay Island. It is suggested that Chembur is the same place referred to as Saimur by the Arab writers (915–1137), Sibor in Cosmas Indicopleustes (535), Chemula in the Kanheri cave inscriptions (300–500), Symulla by the author of the Periplus of the Erythraean Sea (247), Symulla or Timulla by Ptolemy (150), and perhaps even Perimula by Pliny (A.D. 77). This is, however, disputed. Chembur is also said to be a reference to Chevul at the mouth of the Kundalika River on mainland Maharashtra. Later, the area occupied was said to have occupied a branch of an animal home.

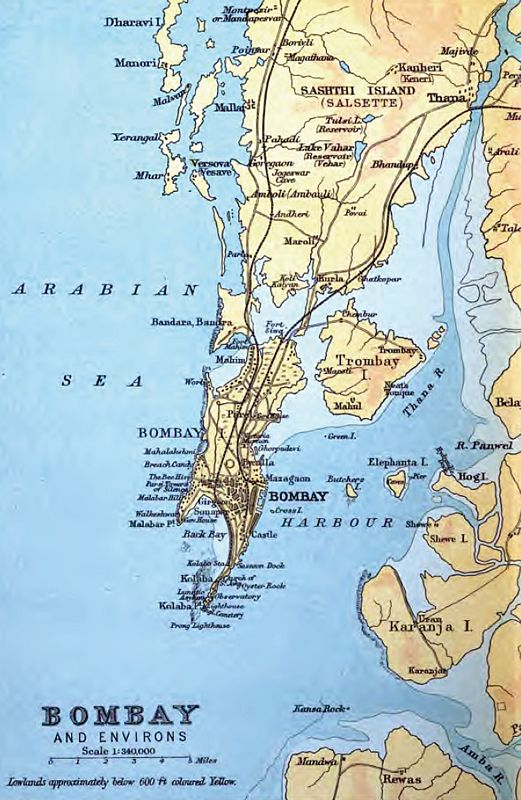
1893 map showing Chembur in the North-West of Trombay Island

The Bombay Presidency Golf Club was established in 1827, and was later re-built to meet international standards. No major activity occurred until the Kurla-Chembur single railway line was built in 1906 for garbage trains. The line was opened to passenger traffic in 1924. After construction activity in the 1920s, Chembur was finally opened up in the 1930s. It was made part of Bombay City in 1945.

After independence, Chembur was one of the sites where refugee camps were set up to settle Sindhi Hindu refugees after partition. The industrialisation of Trombay during and after World War II led to the demand for housing and the growth of Chembur thereafter.

== Administration ==
Chembur belongs to the Mumbai South Central parliamentary constituency. It used to be in Mumbai North-East Parliamentary constituency, prior to delimitation in 2008, where it was moved to Mumbai South Central parliamentary Constituency. The current sitting Member of Parliament of Mumbai South Central is Shiv Sena (UBT) Anil Desai.

The Current Member of the Legislative Assembly of Chembur is Mr. Prakash Vaikunth Phaterpekar of the Shiv Sena (UBT).

Chembur is the seat of the M Ward offices. The M Ward ranges from Thane Creek in the East to Tansa Pipe Line No. 2 in the West, from Somaiyya Nalla in the North to Mahul Creek in the South. Chembur lies inward numbers 141 to 149 with Councillors for each representing it in the Brihanmumbai Municipal Corporation.

== Geography ==
Chembur is surrounded by the neighborhoods of Kurla, Mankhurd, Wadala, BKC, Trombay, Govandi, Chunabhatti, Vidyavihar and Ghatkopar. A marine alluvium-type of soil is observed in Chembur. It has north–south running basalt hills to its south.

== Transport ==
Modes of public transport in Chembur include autorickshaws, online aggregator cabs such as Uber and Ola, taxicabs, BEST buses, NMMT buses, monorail, and trains. Buses are available from Navi Mumbai to Mumbai and vice versa. The Mumbai Metro will serve Chembur when Line 2 enters service.

=== Dayanand Saraswati Marg ===
Dayanand Saraswati Marg formerly called Central Avenue Road was given its current name in memory of Dayanand Saraswati. Stretches from Chembur Railway Station to Sion Panvel Highway, formerly and commonly called Central Avenue Road. It is lined on both sides mainly with residential complexes and shade trees. In 2008, the height of the road was raised and provided with a sidewalk. The Central Avenue Road is a prime locality in Chembur.

=== Ramkrishna Chemburkar Marg ===
Ramkrishna Chemburkar Marg also known as R.C Marg is located in Chembur. It is named after and a tribute to Ramkrishna Chemburkar a freedom fighter and former chembur corporator. He was elected in 1952 as the corporator of chembur. The road was originally called as Ghatkopar-Mahul road which was changed to Ramkrishna Chemburkar Marg after he died in 1966.

== Environmental problems ==
Chembur had pollution problems in the past and was ranked 46th in a list of the most polluted industrial clusters in India. Studies of Chembur have also found high levels of copper, chromium, calcium, arsenic and mercury in groundwater. Effluents from oil refineries, fertilizer plants and reactors in Chembur are also said to have polluted seawater in Thane Creek and affected marine life.

The main problem was the uncontrolled release of ammonia and nitrous oxides from the Rashtriya Chemicals & Fertilisers (RCF) complex. Although ammonia is easy to scrub, the problem seems to be due to improper operation of pollution control equipment and/or operation of the urea/ammonia complex way beyond the design capacity without augmentation of pollution control equipment.

The Deonar dumping ground in Deonar had caused health issues for the residents of Chembur. In 2008, around 40 residents of Chembur went on a hunger strike to protest against the frequent fires and smoke. Again in 2012, the residents complained to the Brihanmumbai Municipal Corporation on the smoke coming out of the dumping ground, which has been affecting asthma patients.

== See also ==
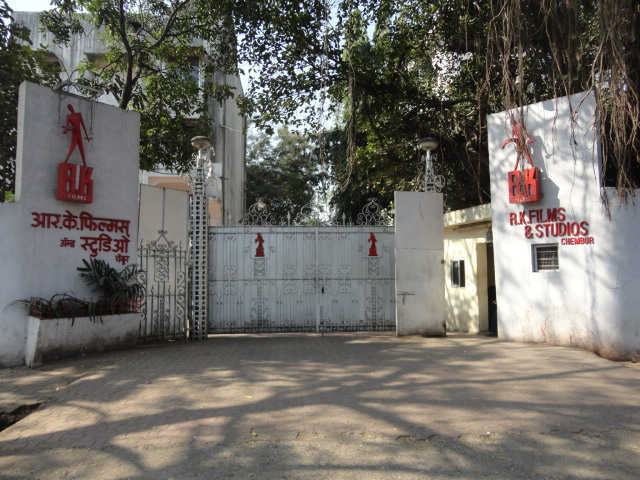
R. K. Films and R. K. Studio was established in Chembur in 1948

- Chembur (Vidhan Sabha constituency)
- R. K. Studios
- Bhabha Atomic Research Centre
