= Chembur Assembly constituency =

Constituency of the Maharashtra legislative assembly in India

Coordinates: 19.05°N 72.90°E

Chembur
- Constituency No. 173 for the Maharashtra Legislative Assembly

Constituency details
- Country: India
- Region: Western India
- State: Maharashtra
- District: Mumbai Suburban
- Lok Sabha constituency: Mumbai South Central
- Established: 1957
- Total electors: 259,002
- Reservation: None

Member of Legislative Assembly
- 15th Maharashtra Legislative Assembly
- Incumbent Tukaram Kate
- Party: SHS
- Alliance: NDA
- Elected year: 2024

Chembur Assembly constituency is one of the 288 Vidhan Sabha (legislative assembly) constituencies of Maharashtra state in western India.

== Overview ==
Chembur (constituency number 173) is one of the 26 Vidhan Sabha constituencies located in the Mumbai Suburban district. Number of electorates in 2009 was 252,142 (male 137,636, female 114,506) there are 43,871 minority voters.

Chembur is part of the Mumbai South Central constituency along with five other Vidhan Sabha segments, namely Anushakti Nagar in Mumbai Suburban district and Dharavi, Sion Koliwada, Wadala and Mahim in the Mumbai City district.

== Members of the Legislative Assembly ==
Year	Member	Party
1957	Oza Indravadanrai Manmohanrai	Indian National Congress
1962	Vadilal Gandhi	Indian National Congress
1967	Hashu Advani	Bharatiya Jana Sangh
1972	Vishwanath Tambe	Indian National Congress
1978	Hashu Advani	Janata Party
1980	Hashu Advani	Bharatiya Janata Party
1985	Parvati Parihar	Indian National Congress
1990	Hashu Advani	Bharatiya Janata Party
1995	Hashu Advani	Bharatiya Janata Party
1999	Pramod Shirwalkar	Bharatiya Janata Party
2004	Chandrakant Handore	Indian National Congress
2009	Chandrakant Handore	Indian National Congress
2014	Prakash Phaterpekar	Shiv Sena
2019	Prakash Phaterpekar	Shiv Sena
2024	Tukaram Kate	Shiv Sena

== Election results ==
=== Assembly Election 2024 ===
2024 Maharashtra Legislative Assembly election : Chembur
Party	Candidate	Votes	%	±%
SS	Tukaram Ramkrishna Kate	63,194	44.81%	▲3.55
SS(UBT)	Prakash Vaikunth Phaterpekar	52,483	37.22%	New
VBA	Anand Bhimrao Jadhav	8,854	6.28%	▼11.68
MNS	Mauli Thorave	7,820	5.55%	▼5.61
RPI(A)	Deepakbhau Nikalje	7,440	5.28%	New
NOTA	None of the Above	2,018	1.43%	▼1.34
BSP	Anita Kiran Patole	1,222	0.87%	▲0.16
Margin of victory		10,711	7.60%	▼7.14
Turnout		143,031	55.22%	▲3.61
Total valid votes		141,013		
Registered electors		259,002		▲2.01
SS hold		Swing	▲3.55	

=== Assembly Election 2019 ===
2019 Maharashtra Legislative Assembly election : Chembur
Party	Candidate	Votes	%	±%
SS	Prakash Vaikunth Phaterpekar	53,264	41.27%	▲6.30
INC	Chandrakant Handore	34,246	26.53%	▼1.04
VBA	Rajendra Jagannath Mahulkar	23,178	17.96%	New
MNS	Karna (Bala) Dunbale	14,404	11.16%	▲6.86
NOTA	None of the Above	3,578	2.77%	▼0.10
BSP	Madhu Rama More	910	0.71%	▼1.06
Margin of victory		19,018	14.73%	▲7.34
Turnout		132,681	52.26%	▲2.34
Total valid votes		129,076		
Registered electors		253,901		▼9.19
SS hold		Swing	▲6.30	

=== Assembly Election 2014 ===
2014 Maharashtra Legislative Assembly election : Chembur
Party	Candidate	Votes	%	±%
SS	Prakash Vaikunth Phaterpekar	47,410	34.97%	New
INC	Chandrakant Handore	37,383	27.57%	▼10.85
RPI(A)	Dipak Sadashiv Nikalje	36,615	27.00%	▲10.43
MNS	Sarika Manoj Sawant Thadani	5,832	4.30%	▼19.56
NCP	Ravindra Pawar	3,933	2.90%	New
NOTA	None of the Above	3,894	2.87%	New
BSP	Raju Kacharu Sontakke	2,394	1.77%	▲0.79
Margin of victory		10,027	7.40%	▼7.16
Turnout		139,490	49.89%	▼0.47
Total valid votes		135,591		
Registered electors		279,585		▲10.88
SS gain from INC		Swing	▼3.45	

=== Assembly Election 2009 ===
2009 Maharashtra Legislative Assembly election : Chembur
Party	Candidate	Votes	%	±%
INC	Chandrakant Handore	47,431	38.42%	▼1.01
MNS	Anil Bachubhai Chauhan	29,465	23.87%	New
BJP	Anil Gajanan Thakur	21,751	17.62%	▼19.72
RPI(A)	Deepak Sadashiv Nikalje	20,467	16.58%	New
BSP	Sanjay Shantaram Waghmare	1,207	0.98%	▼0.37
Independent	Prabhunath Yadav	803	0.65%	New
Margin of victory		17,966	14.55%	▲12.46
Turnout		123,465	48.97%	▼1.36
Total valid votes		123,461		
Registered electors		252,142		▲8.30
INC hold		Swing	▼1.01	

=== Assembly Election 2004 ===
2004 Maharashtra Legislative Assembly election : Chembur
Party	Candidate	Votes	%	±%
INC	Chandrakant Handore	46,196	39.43%	New
BJP	Pramod Shirwalkar	43,746	37.33%	▼13.86
BSP	Bhikkhu Viral Bhadant	1,581	1.35%	▼8.02
Independent	Harishchandra Yadav	962	0.82%	New
SP	Kairo Ajmernsing	803	0.69%	New
Margin of victory		2,450	2.09%	▼33.49
Turnout		117,173	50.33%	▲6.69
Total valid votes		117,173		
Registered electors		232,822		▼10.50
INC gain from BJP		Swing	▼11.77	

=== Assembly Election 1999 ===
1999 Maharashtra Legislative Assembly election : Chembur
Party	Candidate	Votes	%	±%
BJP	Pramod Shirwalkar	58,118	51.20%	▲12.52
Independent	Chandrakant Handore	17,727	15.62%	New
BBM	Arjun Dangle	17,614	15.52%	New
BSP	Ahluwalia Inderjit Satwant	10,637	9.37%	New
Independent	Suresh Sadashiv Ahire	1,780	1.57%	New
Independent	Uma Datta Gharat	1,742	1.53%	New
AIADMK	V. Krishnadas	1,559	1.37%	New
Margin of victory		40,391	35.58%	▲25.81
Turnout		113,979	43.82%	▼2.52
Total valid votes		113,521		
Registered electors		260,133		▲2.46
BJP hold		Swing	▲12.52	

=== Assembly By-election 1996 ===
1996 Maharashtra Legislative Assembly by-election : Chembur
Party	Candidate	Votes	%	±%
BJP	Pramod Shirwalkar	45,328	38.68%	▼3.42
RPI	Arjun Dangle	33,874	28.91%	▲28.37
INC	Parvati Parihar	33,683	28.74%	▼2.71
JP	Jai Sankar Shetty	998	0.85%	New
Margin of victory		11,454	9.77%	▼0.87
Turnout		120,159	47.33%	▼11.15
Total valid votes		117,190		
Registered electors		253,890		▲5.99
BJP hold		Swing	▼3.42	

=== Assembly Election 1995 ===
1995 Maharashtra Legislative Assembly election : Chembur
Party	Candidate	Votes	%	±%
BJP	Hashu Advani	57,790	42.10%	▼5.67
INC	Kunnure Annasaheb Ramchandra	43,172	31.45%	New
BSP	Chandrakant Handore	19,426	14.15%	New
BBM	Babasaheb Dnyanu Bansode	9,691	7.06%	New
JD	R. Chinna Pandian	2,667	1.94%	▼1.77
Margin of victory		14,618	10.65%	▲10.01
Turnout		139,594	58.28%	▲2.76
Total valid votes		137,279		
Registered electors		239,534		▲25.48
BJP hold		Swing	▼5.67	

=== Assembly Election 1990 ===
1990 Maharashtra Legislative Assembly election : Chembur
Party	Candidate	Votes	%	±%
BJP	Hashu Advani	49,739	47.76%	▲13.52
RPI	Chandrakant Handore	49,071	47.12%	▲45.99
JD	Dharpawar Thukaram Mahadev	3,867	3.71%	New
INS(SCS)	S. T. Sengupta	761	0.73%	New
Margin of victory		668	0.64%	▼8.79
Turnout		105,376	55.20%	▲3.79
Total valid votes		104,134		
Registered electors		190,898		▲20.54
BJP gain from INC		Swing	▲4.08	

=== Assembly Election 1985 ===
1985 Maharashtra Legislative Assembly election : Chembur
Party	Candidate	Votes	%	±%
INC	Parihar Parvati Laxmnarain	35,115	43.68%	New
BJP	Hashu Advani	27,529	34.24%	▼10.93
Independent	Chandrakant Handore	12,432	15.46%	New
Independent	Ramakant P. Shinde	2,185	2.72%	New
RPI	Kadam B. S.	908	1.13%	▼13.84
Independent	Jatolia Ruparam Shivramji	869	1.08%	New
Margin of victory		7,586	9.44%	▲3.02
Turnout		81,300	51.33%	▲11.23
Total valid votes		80,392		
Registered electors		158,373		▲13.99
INC gain from BJP		Swing	▼1.49	

=== Assembly Election 1980 ===
1980 Maharashtra Legislative Assembly election : Chembur
Party	Candidate	Votes	%	±%
BJP	Hashu Advani	24,810	45.17%	New
INC(I)	Vicki Kapoor	21,288	38.76%	New
RPI	Dayanand Jagannath Mhaske	8,222	14.97%	New
Independent	Yadav Suryabali Chhangu	359	0.65%	New
Margin of victory		3,522	6.41%	▼24.65
Turnout		55,576	40.00%	▼22.05
Total valid votes		54,925		
Registered electors		138,941		▲11.98
BJP gain from JP		Swing	▼11.15	

=== Assembly Election 1978 ===
1978 Maharashtra Legislative Assembly election : Chembur
Party	Candidate	Votes	%	±%
JP	Hashu Advani	43,028	56.32%	New
INC	Rupavate Premchand Damodar	19,297	25.26%	▼31.91
Independent	Dayanand Jagannath Mhaske	6,003	7.86%	New
SS	Ambre Gopinath Sakharam	5,996	7.85%	▼1.15
Independent	Bhagwanji Mayaram Davariya	1,766	2.31%	New
Margin of victory		23,731	31.06%	▼3.08
Turnout		77,854	62.75%	▼1.30
Total valid votes		76,404		
Registered electors		124,078		▼26.51
JP gain from INC		Swing	▼0.85	

=== Assembly Election 1972 ===
1972 Maharashtra Legislative Assembly election : Chembur
Party	Candidate	Votes	%	±%
INC	Vishwanath Krishna Tembe	60,690	57.17%	▲31.7
ABJS	Hashu Parasaram Advani	24,453	23.03%	▼5.4
RPI	Ramchandra Genuji Kharat	10,590	9.98%	▼5.11
SS	Chandrakant S. Tendulkar	9,556	9.00%	New
PWPI	Ramnath S. Prabhakar	537	0.51%	New
Independent	Subhash Keshao Mayekar	332	0.31%	New
Margin of victory		36,237	34.13%	▲31.17
Turnout		108,728	64.40%	▼5.44
Total valid votes		106,158		
Registered electors		168,840		▲50.16
INC gain from ABJS		Swing	▲28.74	

=== Assembly Election 1967 ===
1967 Maharashtra Legislative Assembly election : Chembur
Party	Candidate	Votes	%	±%
ABJS	Hashu Advani	21,841	28.43%	▲12.77
INC	N. G. Acharya	19,561	25.47%	▼30.72
RPI	M. B. Morwe	11,589	15.09%	New
PSP	V. Khanolkar	9,775	12.73%	New
Independent	C. Raju	5,977	7.78%	New
Independent	J. Jadav	4,182	5.44%	New
SWA	S. Mirza	3,612	4.70%	New
Margin of victory		2,280	2.97%	▼34.96
Turnout		80,446	71.55%	▲5.49
Total valid votes		76,814		
Registered electors		112,438		▼33.23
ABJS gain from INC		Swing	▼27.75	

=== Assembly Election 1962 ===
1962 Maharashtra Legislative Assembly election : Chembur
Party	Candidate	Votes	%	±%
INC	Vadilal Chatrabhuj Gandhi	59,446	56.19%	New
CPI	Raghunath Janardan Dhupkar	19,319	18.26%	New
ABJS	Sardarilal Moolchand Gupta	16,568	15.66%	New
Independent	Premratan Fakirchand Vohra	6,292	5.95%	New
Independent	S. M. V. Giri	2,430	2.30%	New
Socialist Party (India)	Vishnu Narhar Sane	1,044	0.99%	New
Independent	Vishwanath Sadashiv Bapat	703	0.66%	New
Margin of victory		40,127	37.93%	
Turnout		109,753	65.18%	
Total valid votes		105,802		
Registered electors		168,390		
INC win (new seat)				

== See also ==
- Chembur
- List of constituencies of Maharashtra Vidhan Sabha
