= Hashu Advani =

Indian politician

Hashu Advani (1926–1995) was a leader of Bharatiya Janata Party and its earlier incarnation of Jana Sangh. He was born in Hyderabad, Sindh. Later he migrated to Mumbai. He was a cabinet minister in Government of Maharashtra in 1995.. He was elected to Maharashtra Legislative Assembly from Chembur constituency in 1967 (Jana Sangh), 1978 (Janata Party), and later as BJP member in 1980, 1990, 1995. He served as State Minister for Urban Development from 1978 to 1980 and as Minister for Finance and Planning from March 1995 until his death in office later in the same year.
