= Govandi =

Govandi Gaondevi Mata Gaondevi
- Suburb
- Nickname: Govandi
- Location in Mumbai, India
- Coordinates: 19.05°N 72.9°E
- Mumbai: India
- State: Maharashtra
- District: Mumbai Suburban
- City: Mumbai
- Zone: 5
- Ward: M

Government
  - Body: Brihanmumbai Municipal Corporation (MCGM)

Languages
  - Official: Marathi
- Time zone: UTC+5:30 (IST)
- PIN: 400048

Govandi is a suburb in eastern Mumbai, Maharashtra. The closest railway station is Govandi railway station which is on the Harbour Line of the Mumbai Suburban Railway.

The suburb contains many of the displaced settlements. In July 2025, Brihanmumbai Municipal Corporation planned to redevelop 64 slum pockets across Mumbai and has marked 18 slum colonies for redevelopment in Govandi.

The Deonar dumping ground, set up in 1927, is close to Govandi.

In December 2024, an architect and urban planners’ collective named Community Design Agency from Natwar Parekh Compound, opened community spaces, Humraahi and Awaz, similar to the existing Kitaab Mahal, at Govandi to create creative spaces through architectural changes for the well-being of its residents.

== See also ==
- Mankhurd Shivaji Nagar (Vidhan Sabha constituency)
- Deonar
