= Anushakti Nagar Assembly constituency =

Constituency of the Maharashtra legislative assembly in India

Coordinates: 19.04°N 72.93°E

Anushakti Nagar
- Constituency No. 172 for the Maharashtra Legislative Assembly

Constituency details
- Country: India
- Region: Western India
- State: Maharashtra
- District: Mumbai Suburban
- Lok Sabha constituency: Mumbai South Central
- Established: 2008
- Total electors: 269,151
- Reservation: None

Member of Legislative Assembly
- 15th Maharashtra Legislative Assembly
- Incumbent Sana Malik
- Party: NCP
- Alliance: NDA
- Elected year: 2024

Anushakti Nagar Assembly constituency is one of the 288 Vidhan Sabha (legislative assembly) constituencies of Maharashtra state in western India and Mumbai South-Central (Lok Sabha constituency).

== Overview ==
Anushakti Nagar (constituency number 172) is one of the 26 Vidhan Sabha constituencies located in the Mumbai Suburban district. Number of electorates in 2009 was 238,902 (male 132,549, female 106,353) there are 84,721 voters from minority community.

Anushakti Nagar is part of the Mumbai South Central constituency along with five other Vidhan Sabha segments, namely Chembur in Mumbai Suburban district and Dharavi, Sion Koliwada, Wadala and Mahim in the Mumbai City district.

== Members of the Legislative Assembly ==
Year	Member	Party
Till 2009 : Constituency did not exist
2009	Nawab Malik	Nationalist Congress Party
2014	Tukaram Kate	Shiv Sena
2019	Nawab Malik	Nationalist Congress Party
2024	Sana Malik	Nationalist Congress Party

== Election results ==
=== Assembly Election 2024 ===
2024 Maharashtra Legislative Assembly election : Anushakti Nagar
Party	Candidate	Votes	%	±%
NCP	Sana Malik	49,341	34.70	New
NCP-SP	Fahad Ahmad	45,963	32.32	New
MNS	Acharya Navin Vidyadhar	28,362	19.95	▲15.65
VBA	Satish Waman Rajguru	10,514	7.39	New
Independent	Jayprakash Babulal Agarwal	4,075	2.87	New
NOTA	None of the Above	3,884	2.73	▲1.06
BSP	Adv. Mahendra Tulshiram Bhingardive	1,795	1.26	▲0.30
Peace Party (India)	Aliya Azad Sanjar	924	0.65	New
Margin of victory		3,378	2.38	▼6.94
Turnout		1,46,075	54.27	▼1.53
Total valid votes		1,42,191		
Registered electors		2,69,151		▲6.84
NCP gain from NCP		Swing	▼12.93	

=== Assembly Election 2019 ===
2019 Maharashtra Legislative Assembly election : Anushakti Nagar
Party	Candidate	Votes	%	±%
NCP	Nawab Malik	65,217	47.63	▲18.49
SS	Tukaram Ramkrishna Kate	52,466	38.31	▲8.42
Independent	Yasin Ismail Sayed	7,701	5.62	New
MNS	Adv. Vijay Suresh Raorane	5,879	4.29	▲1.84
NOTA	None of the Above	2,290	1.67	▲0.49
Independent	Akbar Hussain Shafi Hussain	1,980	1.45	New
BSP	Agarwal Jayaprakash Babulal	1,319	0.96	▼0.24
Margin of victory		12,751	9.31	▲8.56
Turnout		1,39,306	55.30	▲8.12
Total valid votes		1,36,936		
Registered electors		2,51,916		▼12.89
NCP gain from SS		Swing	▲17.74	

=== Assembly Election 2014 ===
2014 Maharashtra Legislative Assembly election : Anushakti Nagar
Party	Candidate	Votes	%	±%
SS	Tukaram Ramkrishna Kate	39,966	29.89	▲0.76
NCP	Nawab Malik	38,959	29.14	▼6.19
BJP	Vitthal Ambaji Kharatmol	23,767	17.77	New
INC	Mahulkar Rajendra Jagannath	17,615	13.17	New
PWPI	Akbar Hussain Alias Raju Bhai	4,910	3.67	New
MNS	Veena Rajesh Ukrande	3,285	2.46	▼12.73
BSP	Ayyer Ganesh	1,612	1.21	▼1.31
NOTA	None of the Above	1,577	1.18	New
Margin of victory		1,007	0.75	▼5.44
Turnout		1,35,294	46.78	▲0.11
Total valid votes		1,33,712		
Registered electors		2,89,188		▲21.05
SS gain from NCP		Swing	▼5.43	

=== Assembly Election 2009 ===
2009 Maharashtra Legislative Assembly election : Anushakti Nagar
Party	Candidate	Votes	%	±%
NCP	Nawab Malik	38,928	35.32	
SS	Kate Tukaram Ramkrishna	32,103	29.13	
MNS	Acharya Navin Vidyadhar	16,737	15.19	
RPI(A)	Gautam Keshav Sonawane	7,274	6.60	
Independent	Mohammed Farooque Chamkude	6,972	6.33	
Independent	Ravikumar Rajan Pandayan	2,920	2.65	
BSP	Abdul Gani Nijamuddin Shaikh	2,767	2.51	
Margin of victory		6,825	6.19	
Turnout		1,10,215	46.13	
Total valid votes		1,10,208		
Registered electors		2,38,900		
NCP win (new seat)				

== See also ==
- Anushakti Nagar
- List of constituencies of Maharashtra Vidhan Sabha
