= Siddhanath Temple =

Siddhanath Temple may also refer to:

- Bhoodsidhhanath regarding Siddhanath Temple located in Bhood
- Siddhanath Temple, Kharsundi regarding Siddhanath Temple located in Kharsundi, also known as Kharsundisiddhanath
- Siddhanath Temple, Mhaswad regarding Siddhanath Temple located in Mhaswad, also known as Mhaswadsiddhanath
- Revansiddha Temple regarding Revan Sidhhanath Temple located in Renavi
- Siddhanath Temple, Nemawar
- Sidhhanath Temple, in Siddhanath near Kanamadi located in Jath Taluk of Sangli District
