= Khanabad =

Xanabad or Khanabad may refer to:

== Afghanistan ==
- Khan Abad, a town in Kunduz Province
- Khan Abad District, a district in Kunduz Province
- Khanabad River, a tributary of the Kunduz River

== Azerbaijan ==
- Xanabad, Khojaly, a village in the Khojaly District
- Xanabad, Yevlakh, a village and municipality in the Yevlakh Rayon

== Iran ==
- Khanabad, Fars, a village in Shurab Rural District
- Khanabad, Hamadan, alternate name of Emamzadeh Abdollah, Hamadan
- Khanabad, Isfahan, a village in Tudeshk Rural District
- Khanabad, Dehgolan, a village in Yeylan-e Shomali Rural District
- Khanabad, Kamyaran, a village in Shahu Rural District
- Khanabad, Aligudarz, a village in Borborud-e Gharbi Rural District
- Khanabad, Delfan, a village in Nurabad Rural District
- Khanabad, Dorud, a village in Heshmatabad Rural District
- Khanabad, Khorramabad, a village in Sepiddasht Rural District
- Khanabad, Markazi, alternate name of Khatamabad, Markazi
- Khanabad, Razavi Khorasan, a village in Bizaki Rural District

== Pakistan ==
- Khanabad, Azad Kashmir, a village in Mirpur District
- Khanabad, Gilgit Baltistan, a village in Hunza district

== Uzbekistan ==
- Khanabad, alternate name of Xonobod, a city in Andijan Region

== See also ==
- Khan (disambiguation)
- Khanpur (disambiguation)
