= Khanapur (disambiguation) =

Khanapur is a town in Belagavi district, Karnataka, India.

- Khanapur, Karnataka Assembly constituency, India

Khanapur may also refer to:

- Khanapur, Gokak taluk, village in Gokak taluk, Belagavi district, Karnataka, India
- M.Khanapur, village in Belagavi district, Karnataka, India
- U Khanapur, village in Belagavi district, Karnataka, India
- Khanapur-M-Narendra, village in Dharwad district, Karnataka, India
- Khanapur-M-Tadakod, village in Dharwad district, Karnataka, India
- Khanapur (Vita), city and taluk in Sangli district, Maharashtra, India
  - Khanapur, Maharashtra Assembly constituency, India
- Khanapur, Adilabad, mandal headquarters in Adilabad district, Telangana, India
  - Khanapur, Telangana Assembly constituency, India
- Khanapur, Chevella mandal, village and panchayat in Ranga Reddy district, Telangana, India
- Khanapur, Ibrahimpatnam mandal, village and panchayat in Ranga Reddy district, Telangana, India
- Khanapur, Prayagraj, village in Uttar Pradesh, India

== See also ==
- Khana (disambiguation)
- Khan (disambiguation)
- Pur (disambiguation)
- Khanpur (disambiguation)
- Khanapur Assembly constituency (disambiguation)
