= Khanpur =

Khanpur may refer to:

== Places in India ==
- Khanpur, Chanditala-II, a village in Hooghly district, West Bengal
- Khanpur, Delhi, a neighbourhood in Delhi
- Khanpur, Ghazipur, a village in Ghazipur district, Uttar Pradesh
- Khanpur, Gujarat, a town in Gujarat
- Khanpur, Hoshiarpur, a village in Punjab
- Khanpur J. Aurangabad, a village in Shahjahanpur district, Uttar Pradesh
- Khanpur, Jhalawar, a town in Jhalawar district, Rajasthan
  - Khanpur (Rajasthan Assembly constituency)
- Khanpur, Kapurthala, a village in Kapurthala district, Punjab
- Khanpur Khusti, a village in Uttar Pradesh
- Khanpur, Ludhiana West, a village in Ludhiana district, Punjab
- Khanpur, Murshidabad, a census town in West Bengal
- Khanpur, Phillaur, a village in Jalandhar district, Punjab
- Khanpur Urf Birbhanpur, a village in Uttar Pradesh
- Khanpur, Uttar Pradesh, a town in Bulandshahr district, in Uttar Pradesh
- Khanpur, Uttarakhand, a community development block of Uttarakhand
  - Khanpur (Uttarakhand Assembly constituency)

== Places in Pakistan ==
- Khanpur, Chakwal, a town in Chakwal District
- Khanpur, Haripur, a town in Haripur district
- Khanpur, Lower Dir, a union council in Lower Dir District
- Khanpur, Sindh, a town in Shikarpur District
- Khanpur Katora, a city in Rahim Yar Khan District
- Khanpur Mahar, a town in Ghotki District

== Other uses ==
- Khanpur (crater), a crater on Mars

== See also ==
- Khan (disambiguation)
- Pur (disambiguation)
- Khanabad (disambiguation)
- Khangaon (disambiguation)
- Khanpur Assembly constituency (disambiguation)
- Khanpur Tehsil (disambiguation)
- Khanapur (disambiguation)
- Kanpur (disambiguation)
