= Jadhavwadi, Khanapur =

Village in Maharashtra

Jadhavwadi
- Village
- Interactive map of Jadhavwadi
- Country: India
- State: Maharashtra
- District: Sangli district
- Talukas: Khanapur (Vita)

Languages
  - Official: Marathi
- Time zone: UTC+5:30 (IST)
- Nearest city: Vita
- Lok Sabha constituency: Sangli
- Vidhan Sabha constituency: Khanapur-Atpadi

Jadhavwadi is a village of approximately 2,500 people in the Khanapur taluka of the Sangli district of Maharashtra, India.

== Nearby locations ==
Khanpur- Bhud (lengare) Road

- Gorewadi,
- Jakhinwadi,
- Ainwadi
- Dhorale
- Khanapur (Taluka)
- Vita
- Bhood
- Lengare
- Devikhindi
