= Balawdi =

Village in Maharashtra

Balawadi Balawadi(Khanapur)
- village
- Location in Maharashtra, India Balawadi (India)
- Coordinates: 17°17′58″N 74°43′11″E
- Country: India
- State: Maharashtra
- District: Sangli district
- Taluka: Khanapur (Vita)

Languages
  - Official: Marathi
- Time zone: UTC+5:30 (IST)
- Nearest city: Vita
- Lok Sabha constituency: Sangli
- Vidhan Sabha constituency: Khanapur-Atpadi

Balawadi is a village located in Khanapur (Vita) Taluka, Sangli District of Maharashtra, India.

== Places Near ==
- Vita
- Bhood
- Khanapur (Vita)
