= Devikhindi =

Village in Maharashtra

- village
- Location in Maharashtra, India Devikhindi (India)
- Coordinates: 17°22′52″N 74°38′37″E
- Country: India
- State: Maharashtra
- District: Sangli district
- Talukas: Khanapur (Vita)

Languages
  - Official: Marathi
- Time zone: UTC+5:30 (IST)
- Nearest city: Vita
- Lok Sabha constituency: Sangli
- Vidhan Sabha constituency: Khanapur-Atpadi

Devikhindi is a village in Khanapur (Vita) taluka of Sangli district of Maharashtra in India. It belongs to Desh or Paschim Maharashtra region. It is situated 21 km away from sub-district headquarter Vita and 75 km away from district headquarter Sangli. As per 2009 stats, Devikhindi village is also a gram panchayat.

The total geographical area of village is 2457.91 hectares. Devikhindi has a total population of 2,212 peoples. There are about 562 houses in Devikhindi village. Vita is nearest town to Devikhindi which is approximately 21 km away.

== Places Near ==
- Vita
- Bhood
- Lengare
