= Khangaon =

Khangaon or Khanagaon may refer to any of the following villages in India:

- Khangaon, Madhubani district, Bihar
- Khangaon, Bhojpur district, Bihar
- Khangaon, Khargone district, Madhya Pradesh
- Khangaon, Wardha district, Maharashtra
- Khangaon, Katol tehsil, Nagpur district, Maharashtra
- Khangaon, Kalameshwar tehsil, Nagpur district, Maharashtra
- Khangaon, Savner tehsil, Nagpur district, Maharashtra
- Khangaon, Chandrapur district, Maharashtra
- Khangaon, Yavatmal district, Maharashtra
- Khangaon Najik, Nashik district, Maharashtra
- Khangaon Thadi, Nashik district, Maharashtra
- Khangaon, Kota district, Rajasthan
- Khanagaon, Belagavi district, Karnataka
- Khanagaon (K.H.), Belagavi district, Karnataka
- Khanagaon (B.K.), Belagavi district, Karnataka

== See also ==
- Khan (disambiguation)
- Khana (disambiguation)
- Gaon (disambiguation)
- Khanpur (disambiguation)
