= Walwan =

Village in Maharashtra

- village
- Location in Maharashtra, India Walwan (India)
- Coordinates: 17°21′22″N 74°43′8″E
- Country: India
- State: Maharashtra
- District: Sangli district
- Talukas: Atpadi

Languages
  - Official: Marathi
- Time zone: UTC+5:30 (IST)
- Nearest city: Vita
- Lok Sabha constituency: Sangli
- Vidhan Sabha constituency: Khanapur-Atpadi

Walwan is a village located in Atpadi Taluka, Sangli district of Maharashtra, India.

== Places Near ==
- Atpadi
- Vita
- Bhood
