= National Highway 548E (India) =

National highway in India

National Highway 548E
- Map of National Highway 548E in red

Route information
- Auxiliary route of NH 48
- Length: 53 km (33 mi)

Major junctions
- West end: Mhaswad
- East end: Pandharpur

Location
- Country: India
- States: Maharashtra

Highway system
- Roads in India; Expressways; National; State; Asian
← NH 548C	→ NH 965

National Highway 548E, commonly referred to as NH 548E is a national highway in India. It is a spur road of National Highway 48. NH-548E traverses the state Maharashtra in India.

== Route ==
Mhaswad, Piliv, Pandharpur.

== Junctions ==
NH 548C Terminal near Mhasvad.
NH 965 Terminal near Pandharpur.

== See also ==
- List of national highways in India
- List of national highways in India by state
