= Khanabad, Lorestan =

Khanabad, Lorestan may refer to:

- Khanabad, Aligudarz, a village in Aligudarz County, Lorestan Province, Iran
- Khanabad, Delfan, a village in Delfan County, Lorestan Province, Iran
- Khanabad, Khorramabad, a village in Khorramabad County, Lorestan Province, Iran
