= Jadhavwadi =

Jadhavwadi may refer to:

- Jadhavwadi, Ambegaon, Ambegaon district, Maharashtra, India
- Jadhavwadi, Khanapur, Sangli district, Maharashtra, India
- Jadhavwadi, Mawal, Pune district, Maharashtra, India

== See also ==
- Jadhav, an Indian surname
- Yadav (disambiguation)
- Wadi (disambiguation)
