= Kanpur (disambiguation) =

Kanpur (formerly Cawnpore) is a city in Uttar Pradesh, India.

Kanpur (or Kanapura) may also refer to:

- Kanpur district (disambiguation)
- Kanpura, Rajasthan
- Kanapura, Karnataka
- Kanapuram, Andhra Pradesh, a village in Warangal district
- Kanpur, Hooghly, a village in West Bengal, India
- Kanpur, Odisha, a subdistrict in Cuttack District

== See also ==
- Khanpur (disambiguation)
- Cawnpore–Barabanki Railway, a former railway in India
- Siege of Cawnpore, during the Indian rebellion of 1857
