= Khana =

Khana may refer to:

== Places ==
- Khana, Arghakhanchi, a village in Arghakhanchi district, Nepal
- Khana, Rivers, a Local Government Area in Rivers, Nigeria
- Khana railway station, in Bardhaman district, West Bengal, India
- Kingdom of Khana, in Babylonian times

== People ==
- Khana (poet), Indian poet and astrologer
- Narakorn Khana, footballer from Thailand

== Other ==
- Khana language, Ogoni language of Nigeria

== See also ==
- Khanna (disambiguation)
- Khangaon (disambiguation)
- Khanapur (disambiguation)
- Khanabad (disambiguation)
