= Khanna =

Khanna may refer to:

== Places ==
- Khanna, Ludhiana, a city in the Ludhiana district of Punjab, India
  - Khanna railway station, a railway station on the Ambala–Attari line in Ludhiana district of Punjab, India
- Khanna, Firozpur, a village in Firozpur district of Punjab, India
- Khanna Chamaran, a village in Gurdaspur district of Punjab, India
- Khanna Majra, a village in Ambala district of Haryana, India

== Name ==
- Khanna (name), a surname found among the Khatris of Punjab region including a list of people with this name
- Khanna Omarkhali, Russian writer

== See also ==
- Khana (disambiguation)
