= Siddhanath Temple, Mhaswad =

Hindu temple in Maharashtra, India

Shree Siddhanath Temple, Mhaswad
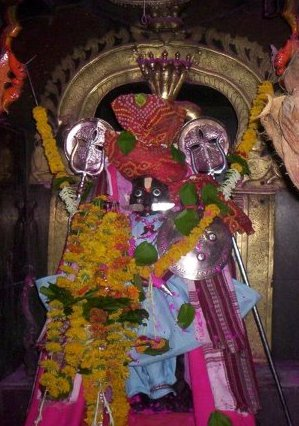
- Shree Mhaswad Siddhanath

- Location within Maharashtra

Religion
- Affiliation: Hinduism
- District: Satara district

Location
- Location: Mhaswad
- State: Maharashtra
- Country: India
- Interactive map of Shree Siddhanath Temple, Mhaswad
- Coordinates: 17°37′52″N 74°47′15″E

Architecture
- Type: Mandir architecture
- Completed: 9th century

The Siddhanath Temple, Mhaswad, in Maharashtra, India, is dedicated to Lord Siddhanath, an incarnation of Shiva (one of the principle deities of Hinduism) and one of among several regional protective (Kshetrapal) gods of Maharashtra. The town of Mhaswad near Satara, approximately 56 kilometres (35 mi) from Pandharpur, is known for its annual Mhaswad Yatra fair in honour of Siddhanath. During the festival, devotees are smeared in pink gulal and carry a chariot of Shree Siddhanath.

== History ==
Historically, maan region was once ruled by Chalukya of Badami. In the 11th century, chalukya rulers built this temple as it was considered to be there an ancestors god, letter in 1738 chalukya descendant Dubal of karad built other half of temple, From then onwards all rituals are performed in presence of Dubal family members. Later, this place was ruled by Mane(माने), a Maratha Kshatriya 07 Kuli clan. The Mane were Noblemen & were considered as pillars of Maratha Empire. Sardar Nagoji Mane was one of the famous ruler's of mhaswad and Ally of {Chhatrapati Rajaram Bhonsle Maharaj}. Sardar Subhanji Mane who was son of Nagoji Mane had taken part in the war of Panipat against Abdali.

During the annual festival, the Lord Shree Siddhanath Ratha Yatra, a chariot of Shree Siddhanath is taken around the town by devotees. Lakhs of people from all over India come to Mhaswad to celebrate the festival and enjoy the fair.

== Gallery ==
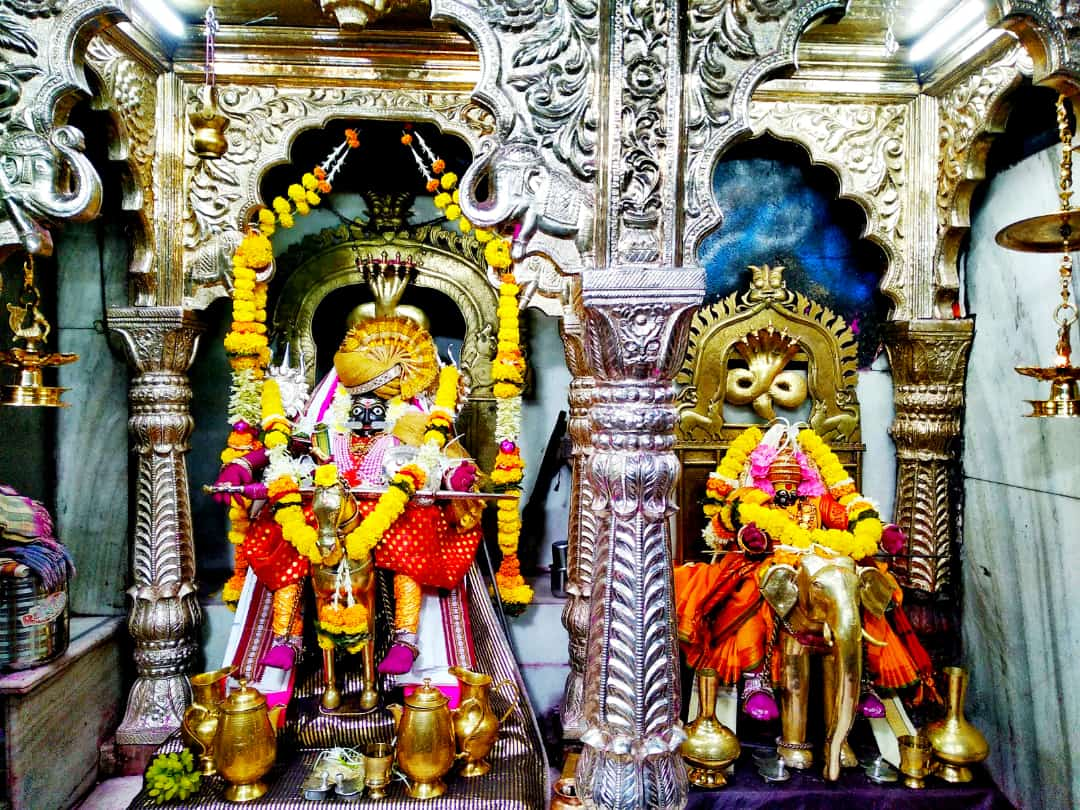
Shree Siddhanath and Mata Jogeshwari, Mhaswad (Satara)

== See also ==
- Sidhhanath Temple, Kharsundi
- Sidhhanath Temple, Bhood
