= Lengare =

Village in Maharashtra

Lengre is a village in Khanapur (Vita) taluka of Sangli district of Maharashtra in India.

== Nearby locations ==
- Vita
- Bhood
- Devikhindi
- Waluj
