= Roopahera =

Roopahera Roopahera Meena
- State: Rajasthan
- District: Kota
- Division: Kota Division
- Named for: Meenas(Patel Roopa Meena and Patel Badal Meena)

Government
  - Type: Democratic
  - Body: Gram Panchayat
- Time zone: UTC+5:30 (IST)
- Area code: 07432
- Vehicle registration: RJ-17

Roopahera (Roopahera Meena) is a village in Jhalawar district, Rajasthan, India.

== Geography ==
It is situated around 4 kilometres (2.5 mi) from Khanpur in Jhalawar district. Coordinates: 24.760564, 76.360124.

It is connected to the Jhalawar-Baran Megha Highway Bypass.

== Education ==
Rajakiya Uchch Prathamik Vidhyalya is the sole school in the village and was established by the government in 1963. It is now classified as an upper primary school.

== Economy ==
The economy of the village is mostly dependent on agriculture and some are on services.
