= Khanapur Assembly constituency =

Khanapur Assembly constituency may refer to

- Khanapur, Karnataka Assembly constituency
- Khanapur, Maharashtra Assembly constituency
- Khanapur, Telangana Assembly constituency

== See also ==
- Khanapur (disambiguation)
