= Narendra Nagar =

Narendra Nagar may refer to:

- Narendranagar, a town in Tehri Garhwal district, Uttarakhand
- Narendra Nagar (politician)
