= Ballia, Siwan =

Ballia is a village in Siwan district of Bihar state in northern India.

== Location ==
It is situated 17 km away from Siwan district. Its coordinates are 26°17'37"N and 84°58'48"E.

== Neighboring villages ==
- Afrad
- Chandpur
- Kanpura
- Gaur
- Modhpur

== Speciality ==
This village is situated on the bank of distributary of river Gandak. People of different religions, celebrate their specific festivals, but Gadh Mela is famous festival to be celebrated here.
