= Khanpur Assembly constituency =

Khanpur Assembly constituency may refer to these state electoral constituencies in India:

- Khanpur, Rajasthan Assembly constituency
- Khanpur, Uttarakhand Assembly constituency

== See also ==
- Khanpur (disambiguation)
