= Khanpur Tehsil =

Khanpur Tehsil may refer to:

- Khanpur Katora Tehsil, in Rahim Yar Khan District in Pakistan
- Khanpur Tehsil, Haripur, in Haripur District in Pakistan
- Khanpur Tehsil, Shikarpur, in Shikarpur District in Pakistan

== See also ==
- Khanpur (disambiguation)
