= Kharsundi =

Village in Maharashtra

- Village
- Location in Maharashtra, India Kharsundi (India)
- Coordinates: 17.341585°N 74.775996°E
- Country: India
- State: Maharashtra
- District: Sangli district
- Talukas: Atpadi

Government
  - Body: Gram panchayat

Population (2011)
  - Total: 6,120

Languages
  - Official: Marathi
- Time zone: UTC+5:30 (IST)
- ISO 3166 code: IN-MH
- Vehicle registration: MH
- Nearest city: Vita
- Lok Sabha constituency: Sangli
- Vidhan Sabha constituency: Khanapur-Atpadi
- Website: maharashtra.gov.in

Kharsundi is a village located in Atpadi Taluka, Sangli District of Maharashtra, India.

Priests offering prayers to Siddhanath, Kharsundi

Kharsundi is well known for Lord Siddhanath. Siddhanath is believed to be an incarnation of Lord Shiva and it is believed that he is the protector of Kharaspundi. Siddhanath is the patron god of Atpadi and adjacent regions and one of among several regional protective (Kshetrapal) gods of Maharashtra. The village is well known in southern India for its large cattle fair, mainly for Khillari breed bulls.

== Places Nearby ==
- Walvan - 06 km
- Bhood - 13.5 km
- Lengre - 17.7 km
- Vita - 31.7 km
- Balwadi - 05 km
- Balewadi - 06 km
- Atpadi - 23.4 km
- Kargani - 13.2 km
- Ghulewadi - 03 km
- Nelkarji - 07 km
- Bhivghat - 13 km
- Kankatrewadi - 6.3 km
- Kavathe Mahankal - 47.5 km
