= Suresh Gurjar =

Indian politician

Member of Rajasthan Legislative Assembly
- Incumbent
- Assumed office 2023
- Preceded by: Narendra Nagar
- Constituency: Khanpur

Personal details
- Political party: Indian National Congress

Suresh Gurjar is an Indian politician and a member of the Indian National Congress.

He is serving as a member of the 16th Rajasthan Assembly from Khanpur Assembly constituency of Jhalawar district.
