= Khanapur Atpadi Assembly constituency =

Constituency of the Maharashtra legislative assembly in India

Coordinates: 17.26°N 74.72°E

Khanapur Atpadi
- Former constituency for the Maharashtra Legislative Assembly

Constituency details
- Country: India
- Region: Western India
- State: Maharashtra
- Established: 1978
- Abolished: 2008

Khanapur Atpadi was one of the assembly segments in Maharashtra Vidhan Sabha in India, from 1978 to 2004 elections. Until 1972 elections, 'Khanapur' Vidhan Sabha seat existed. Then the boundaries of assembly segments were redrawn, and the name of Khanapur seat changed to 'Khanapur Atpadi'. In 2008, the boundaries were redrawn again, and the name of the seat reverted to just Khanapur.

== Members of the Legislative Assembly ==
Election	Member	Party
1978	Sahajirao Ganapatrao Salunkhe	Indian National Congress
1980	Hanumantrao Yashwantrao Patil	Indian National Congress
1985	Sampatrao Sitaram Mane	Indian National Congress
1990	Anil Babar	Indian National Congress
1995	Rajendra @ Nathajirao Rastumrao Deshmukh	Independent politician
1999	Anil Babar	Nationalist Congress Party
2004	Sadashivrao Hanmantrao Patil	Independent politician

== Election results ==
=== Assembly Election 2004 ===
2004 Maharashtra Legislative Assembly election : Khanapur Atpadi
Party	Candidate	Votes	%	±%
Independent	Sadashivrao Hanmantrao Patil	79,813	50.94%	New
NCP	Anil Babar	54,726	34.93%	▼14.47
BJP	Vijaysinh Tatyasaheb Patil	12,619	8.05%	▼2.38
Lok Rajya Party	Anna Alias Ramchandra Mahadev Dange	3,115	1.99%	New
Independent	Rajendra (Anna) Shahaji Nikam	2,823	1.80%	New
CPI	Chandrakant Alias Arun Nanasaheb Mane	1,229	0.78%	New
PWPI	More (Patil) Subash Bhagwanrao	1,216	0.78%	New
Margin of victory		25,087	16.01%	▼4.71
Turnout		1,56,733	72.97%	▲7.42
Total valid votes		1,56,692		
Registered electors		2,14,805		▲21.88
Independent gain from NCP		Swing	▲1.54	

=== Assembly Election 1999 ===
1999 Maharashtra Legislative Assembly election : Khanapur Atpadi
Party	Candidate	Votes	%	±%
NCP	Anil Babar	52,240	49.39%	New
INC	Ramrao Dattatray Patil	30,324	28.67%	▼10.56
BJP	B. N. Deshmukh	11,037	10.44%	▲8.56
Independent	Gulabrao Alias Kiranrao Sampatrao Mane	7,044	6.66%	New
Independent	Vakshe Shrawan Shankar	2,954	2.79%	New
Independent	Kadam Bharat Baburao (Davari)	1,158	1.09%	New
Margin of victory		21,916	20.72%	▲5.90
Turnout		1,15,520	65.55%	▼15.32
Total valid votes		1,05,763		
Registered electors		1,76,238		▲4.11
NCP gain from Independent		Swing	▼4.66	

=== Assembly Election 1995 ===
1995 Maharashtra Legislative Assembly election : Khanapur Atpadi
Party	Candidate	Votes	%	±%
Independent	Deshmukh Rajendra @ Nathajirao Rastumrao	73,998	54.06%	New
INC	Anil Babar	53,708	39.24%	▼15.98
Independent	Isaq Murtuja Pirjade	4,302	3.14%	New
BJP	Kalebag Appso Baba	2,562	1.87%	▼6.21
PWPI	Suryawanshi Uttamrao Bhimrao	940	0.69%	▼0.43
Margin of victory		20,290	14.82%	▼8.28
Turnout		1,39,221	82.24%	▲13.52
Total valid votes		1,36,887		
Registered electors		1,69,280		▲4.24
Independent gain from INC		Swing	▼1.15	

=== Assembly Election 1990 ===
1990 Maharashtra Legislative Assembly election : Khanapur Atpadi
Party	Candidate	Votes	%	±%
INC	Anil Babar	60,383	55.21%	▲1.03
Independent	Hanmantrao Yashavantrao Patil	35,116	32.11%	New
BJP	Kalebag Appasaheb Baba	8,835	8.08%	New
JD	Abasaheb Dattajirao Deshmukh	2,666	2.44%	New
PWPI	Bhimrao Dhondi Suryawanshi	1,220	1.12%	New
Margin of victory		25,267	23.10%	▲14.15
Turnout		1,10,972	68.33%	▲0.54
Total valid votes		1,09,365		
Registered electors		1,62,399		▲20.81
INC hold		Swing	▲1.03	

=== Assembly Election 1985 ===
1985 Maharashtra Legislative Assembly election : Khanapur Atpadi
Party	Candidate	Votes	%	±%
INC	Mane Sampatrao Sitaram	48,659	54.18%	New
IC(S)	Patil Hanamantrao Yashwantrao	40,617	45.23%	New
Margin of victory		8,042	8.95%	▲7.61
Turnout		91,402	67.99%	▲3.60
Total valid votes		89,806		
Registered electors		1,34,426		▲10.59
INC gain from INC(U)		Swing	▲10.69	

=== Assembly Election 1980 ===
1980 Maharashtra Legislative Assembly election : Khanapur Atpadi
Party	Candidate	Votes	%	±%
INC(U)	Hanumantrao Yashwantrao Patil	33,416	43.49%	New
INC(I)	Salunkhe Shahajirao Ganpatrao	32,383	42.15%	New
PWPI	Shinde Raosaheb Balasaheb	8,535	11.11%	▼7.03
Independent	Lakade Gourihar Bhausaheb	1,268	1.65%	New
BJP	Deshmukh Bandopant Narayan	1,231	1.60%	New
Margin of victory		1,033	1.34%	▼18.31
Turnout		78,732	64.77%	▼2.43
Total valid votes		76,833		
Registered electors		1,21,549		▲11.82
INC(U) gain from INC		Swing	▲0.47	

=== Assembly Election 1978 ===
1978 Maharashtra Legislative Assembly election : Khanapur Atpadi
Party	Candidate	Votes	%	±%
INC	Salunkhe Sahajirao Ganapatrao	30,695	43.02%	New
Independent	Deshmukh Babasaheb Alias Rastumrao Chitrojirao	16,674	23.37%	New
PWPI	Pawar Sampatrao Govind	12,944	18.14%	New
JP	Dange Annasaheb Alias Ramchandra Mahadev	8,625	12.09%	New
Independent	Sawant Pandharinath Dhondiram	1,375	1.93%	New
Independent	Kulkarni Pandurang Ramchandra	779	1.09%	New
Margin of victory		14,021	19.65%	
Turnout		73,228	67.37%	
Total valid votes		71,355		
Registered electors		1,08,701		
INC win (new seat)				

== See also ==
- Khanapur Assembly constituency
