= Anil Babar =

Indian politician (1950–2024)

Anil Kalajerao Babar

Member of Maharashtra Legislative Assembly
- In office (2014-2019), (2019 – 2024)
- Preceded by: Sadashivrao Hanmantrao Patil
- Succeeded by: Suhas Anil Babar
- Constituency: Khanapur
- In office (1990-1995), (1999 – 2004)
- Preceded by: Sampatrao Sitaram Mane
- Succeeded by: Sadashivrao Hanmantrao Patil
- Constituency: Khanapur Atpadi

Personal details
- Born: 7 January 1950 Karad, Bombay Province, India
- Died: 31 January 2024 (aged 74) Sangli, Maharashtra, India
- Party: Shiv Sena
- Other political affiliations: Nationalist Congress Party; Indian National Congress
- Spouse: Shobha
- Children: 2
- Website: anilbabar.com

Anil Kalajerao Babar (7 January 1950 – 31 January 2024) was an Indian politician who served as Member of the Maharashtra Legislative Assembly from Khanapur Vidhan Sabha constituency as a member of Shiv Sena.

== Biography ==
Anil Babar (popularly known as Anilrao Babar) was born in an agricultural family, at village Gardi, Taluka Khanapur. Entering politics at an early age, he was elected as a Sarpanch of village Gardi, Taluka Khanapur, at the age of 19. He has been an MLA four times in 1990, 1999, 2014, and 2019. He worked for NCP for 15 years with Sharad Pawar. Then in 2014, Anil Babar decided to join Shiv Sena. Anil Babar's name was discussed for the ministerial position during the 2019 Mahavikas Aghadi government but at that time, he was rejected by the ministry. He was known as a close and trusted associate of Chief Minister, Eknath Shinde after he supported Shinde during the 2022 Maharashtra political crisis.

== Death ==
Babar died at Sangli while battling pneumonia, on 31 January 2024, at the age of 74.

== Political career ==
Year	Office
1972	Elected as member of Sangli Zilla Parishad
1981	Speaker of building department of Sangli Zilla Parishad
1982–1990	Speaker of Khanapur Panchayat samiti
1990	Elected to Maharashtra Legislative Assembly
1991	Chairman Yashwant Sahakari Sakhar Karkhana Ltd. Khanapur
1999	Re-Elected to Maharashtra Legislative Assembly
2001	Director of Sangli Zilla Madhawarti Sahakari Bank Ltd. Sangli
1999–2008	Chairman, National Heavy Engineering Co-Op Ltd. Pune
2014	Re-Elected to Maharashtra Legislative Assembly
2019	Re-Elected to Maharashtra Legislative Assembly
