= Kanpur district =

Kanpur district was a district in the Indian province of Uttar Pradesh until 1977. It was then split into two districts:

- Kanpur Nagar district, the area around the city of Kanpur
- Kanpur Dehat district, the area to the west of Kanpur, administered from Mati-Akbarpur

== See also ==
- Kanpur (disambiguation), a city in Uttar Pradesh
