= Suhas Babar =

Indian politician

Suhas Anil Babar

Member of Maharashtra Legislative Assembly
- Incumbent
- Assumed office 2024
- Preceded by: Anil Babar
- Constituency: Khanapur

Personal details
- Born: Suhas Anil Babar; 13 October 1981 (age 45) Khanapur, Sangli District
- Party: Shiv Sena
- Parent: Anil Babar (Father)

Suhas Babar (born 1981) is an Indian politician from Maharashtra. He is a member of the Maharashtra Legislative Assembly from Khanapur Assembly constituency in Sangli district. He won the 2024 Maharashtra Legislative Assembly election, representing the Shiv Sena Party.

== Early life and education ==
Babar is from, Gardi and Vita Khanapur, Sangli district, Maharashtra. He is the son of Anilrao Kaljerao Babar. He completed his M.B.A. in 2008 at Indian School of Business Management and Administration. Earlier, he did his B.Sc. in 2002 at Balwant College, Vita, which is affiliated with Shivaji University, Kolhapur. Later he did his L.L.B. in 2023 at Bharat University, Pune.

== Career ==
Babar won from Khanapur Assembly constituency representing Shiv Sena in the 2024 Maharashtra Legislative Assembly election. He polled 153,892 votes and defeated his nearest rival, Vaibhav Sadashiv Patil of the Nationalist Congress Party (SP), by a margin of 78,181 votes.

In 2017, he made his electoral debut winning the Maharashtra Zilla Parishad elections.
