= Bhoodsidhhanath =

Lord Bhoodsidhhanatha Temple
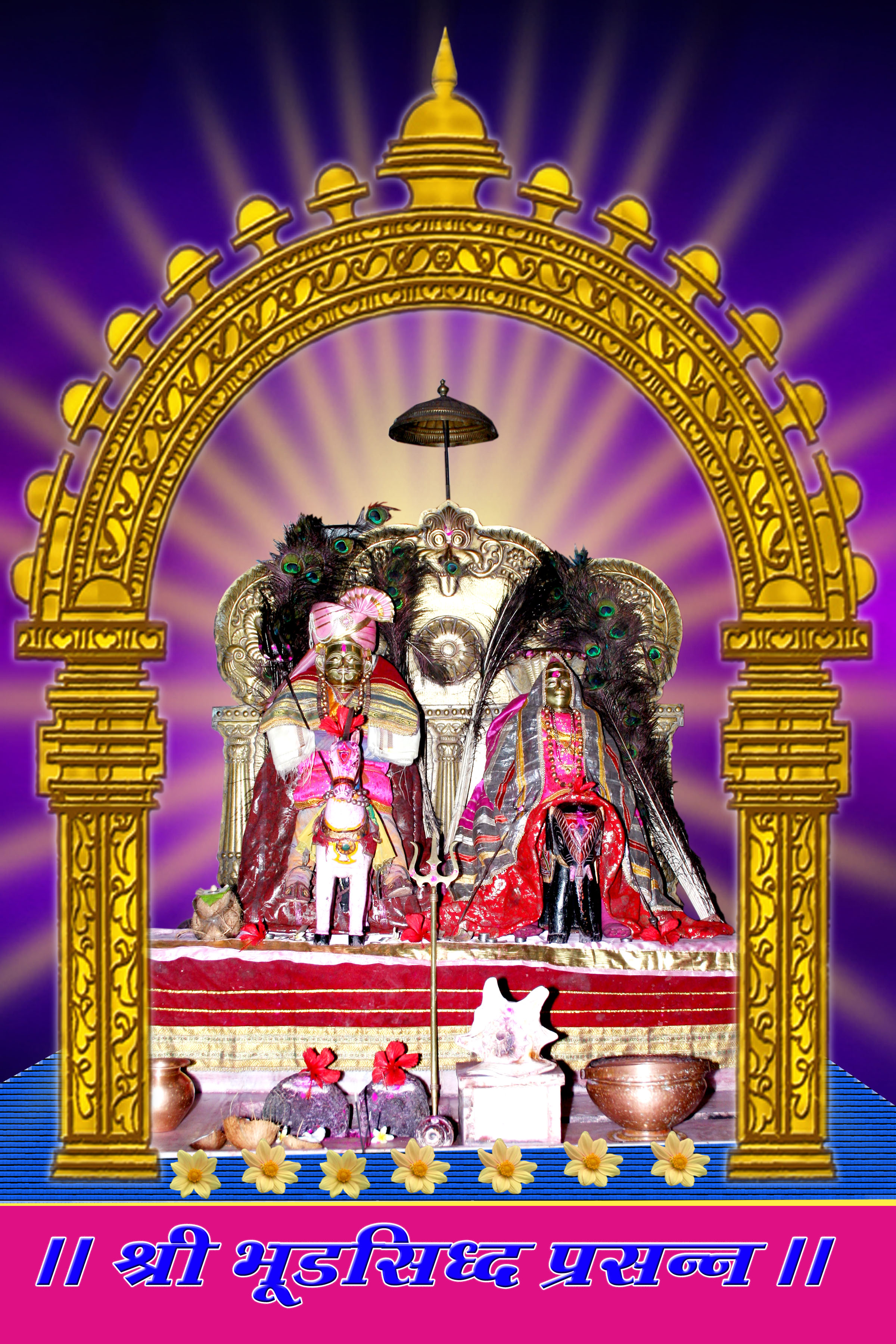
- Lord Bhoodsidhhanatha

- Location within Maharashtra

Religion
- Affiliation: Hinduism
- District: Sangli district
- Deity: Shiva
- Festivals: Chaitra Krishna Astami, Dasara

Location
- Location: Bhood
- State: Maharashtra
- Country: India
- Coordinates: 17°20′23″N 74°41′9″E

Architecture
- Type: Mandir

For other uses related to Sidhhanath Temple, see: Sidhhanath Temple (disambiguation)

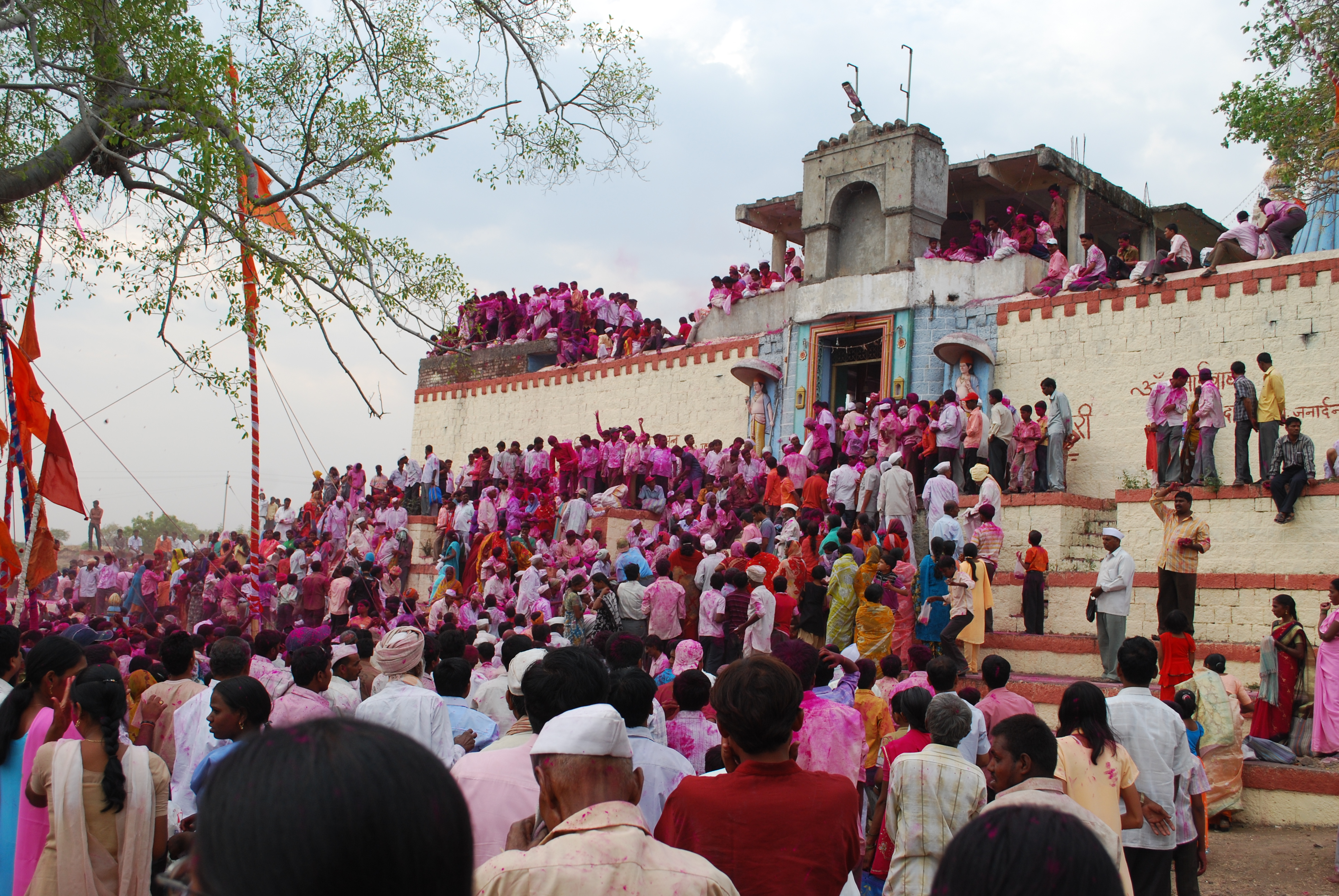
Bhoodsiddanath Mandir

Bhoodsidhhnatha is another name for the Hindu deity Siddhanath, who is believed to be incarnation of Shiva. Siddhanath is patron god of adjacent regions and one of among several regional protective (Kshetrapal) gods of Maharashtra. There is a temple dedicated to Bhoodsidhhnatha at the village of Bhood in Maharashtra., India.

== Chaitra-Astami ==
An annual festival celebrating Bhoodsidhhanatha is held on Chaitra Krishna Ashtami, a three-day celebration of the deity's wedding ceremony. On the first day, a bullock cart race is organised near the temple. Second day is the most important day and on this day Sasankathi(Holy long wooden or metallic bar) and Diva(Holy lamp) are the main attractions. On the third day Kusumba(Type of Bhang) is served as Prasadam to Bhoodsidhhnatha.

== See also ==
- Sidhhanath Temple, Kharsundi
- Revansiddha Temple, Renavi

== Gallery ==
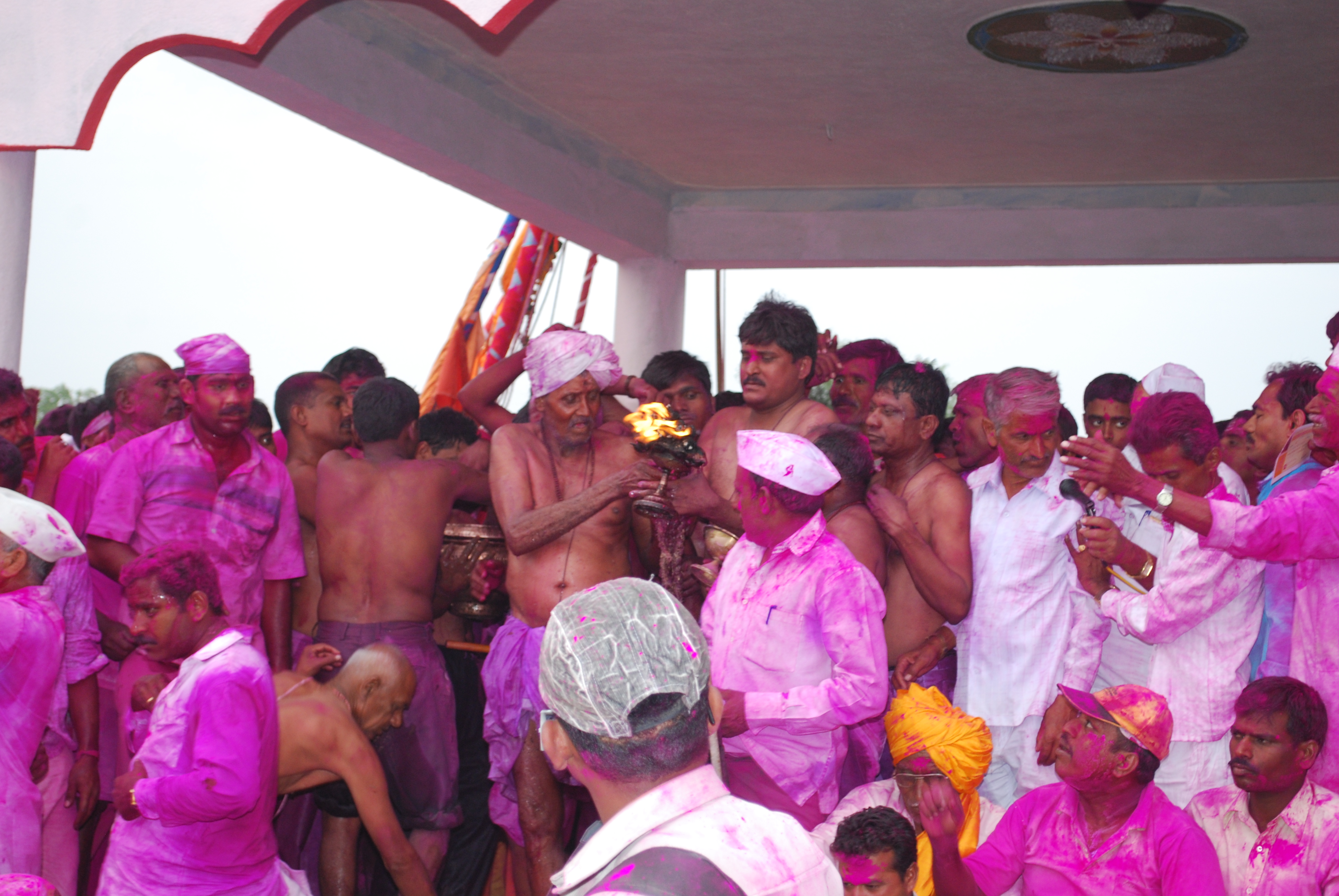
Deva in Chaitra Astami

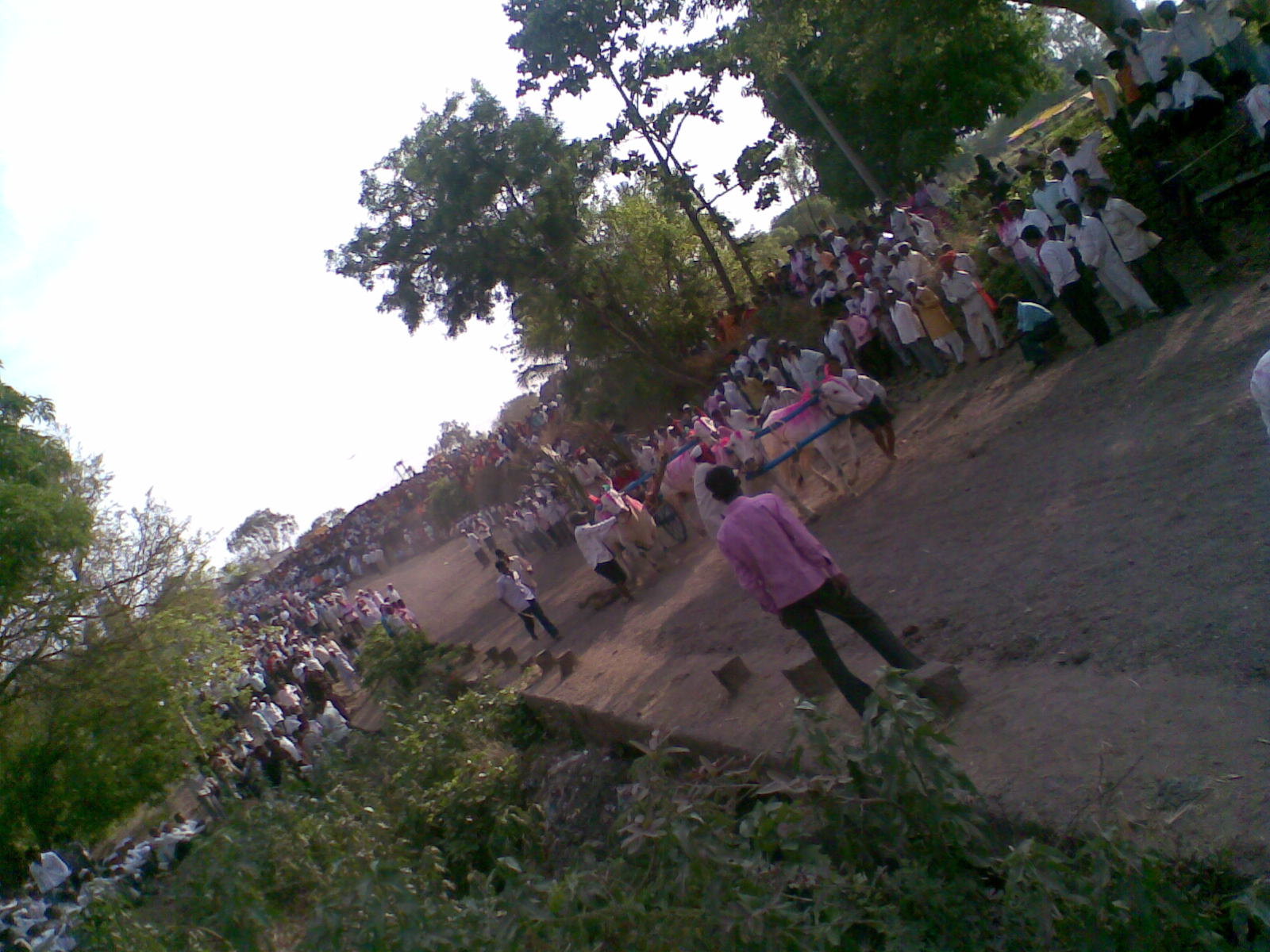
Bullock cart race in Bhood
