= Khanpur J. Aurangabad =

- Location of Khanpur J. Aurangabad in Uttar Pradesh, India
- Coordinates: 28.0982°N 80.2363°E
- Country: India
- State: Uttar Pradesh
- District: Shahjahanpur
- Time zone: UTC+5:30 (IST)
- Postal Code: 242401
- Vehicle registration: UP 27

Khanpur J. Aurangabad is a village in Powayan tehsil in Shahjahanpur district of Uttar Pradesh.

== Nearby Villages ==
Mahmadpur Saijania
Matluvpur
Raghunathpur J. Aurangabad
Aurangabad
Kehmariya
Jaswantapur
Shivpuri
Kunda
Laxmi Pur

== Population ==
Khanpur J. Aurangabad's population is 203. Out of this, 119 are males while the females count 84 here. This village has 49 kids in the age group of 0-6 years. Out of this 32 are boys and 17 are girls
