= Siddhanath Temple, Kharsundi =

Shri Siddhanath Temple, Kharsundi
- सिद्धनाथ मंदिर, खरसुंडी
- Shri Kharsundi Siddanath

- Location within Maharashtra

Religion
- Affiliation: Hinduism
- District: Sangli district
- Festival: Chaitra Astami

Location
- Location: Kharsundi
- State: Maharashtra
- Country: India
- Coordinates: 17°20′35″N 74°46′32″E

Architecture
- Type: Mandir architecture

Kharsundi Siddhanath Temple is a Hindu temple in the village of Kharsundi in Atpadi taluka, Sangli district, Maharashtra, India. The temple dates back to the 12th century and is an example of Hemadpanthi architecture.

Siddhanath, an incarnation of Shiva, is the patron god of Atpadi and adjacent regions, and is one of several regional protective (Kshetrapal) gods of Maharashtra.

== See also ==
- Kharsundi
- Bhoodsidhhanath Temple
- Revansiddha Temple, Renavi
- Balumama Temple- Ahilaynagar- Balewadi
