= Khanapur, Ibrahimpatnam mandal =

Khanapur
- village
- Country: India
- State: Telangana
- District: Ranga Reddy
- Mandal: Ibrahimpatnam
- Talukas: Manchal

Government
  - Body: Mandal Office

Languages
  - Official: Telugu
- Time zone: UTC+5:30 (IST)
- PIN: 501506
- Vehicle registration: TS
- Lok Sabha constituency: Buvanagiri
- Vidhan Sabha constituency: Ibrahim Patan
- Planning agency: Panchayat
- Civic agency: Mandal Office
- Website: telangana.gov.in

Khanapur is a village and panchayat in Ranga Reddy district, Telangana, India.

It falls under Ibrahimpatnam mandal, previously having been part of Manchal mandal until a 2016 reorganisation of Districts, Revenue Divisions and Mandals in Ranga Reddy.
