= Khanabad, Fars =

Village in Fars province, Iran

Khanabad خان اباد
- Village
- Location within Iran
- Coordinates: 29°44′19″N 53°10′55″E
- Country: Iran
- Province: Fars
- County: Arsanjan
- Bakhsh: Central
- Rural District: Shurab

Population (2006)
  - Total: 364
- Time zone: UTC+3:30 (IRST)
  - Summer (DST): UTC+4:30 (IRDT)

Khanabad (Persian: خان اباد, also Romanized as Khānābād; also known as Khānābād-e Bāshī) is a village in Shurab Rural District, in the Central District of Arsanjan County, Fars province, Iran. At the 2006 census, its population was 364, in 71 families.
