= Khanabad, Dehgolan =

Khanabad خان آباد
- Village
- Location within Iran
- Coordinates: 35°26′37″N 47°29′37″E
- Country: Iran
- Province: Kurdistan
- County: Dehgolan
- Bakhsh: Central
- Rural District: Yeylan-e Shomali

Population (2006)
  - Total: 66
- Time zone: UTC+3:30 (IRST)
  - Summer (DST): UTC+4:30 (IRDT)

Khanabad (Persian: خان آباد, also Romanized as Khānābād) is a village in Yeylan-e Shomali Rural District, in the Central District of Dehgolan County, Kurdistan Province, Iran. At the 2006 census, its population was 66, in 17 families. The village is populated by Kurds.
