= Khanabad, Kamyaran =

Khanabad خان آباد
- Village
- Location within Iran
- Coordinates: 34°52′12″N 46°52′16″E
- Country: Iran
- Province: Kurdistan
- County: Kamyaran
- Bakhsh: Central
- Rural District: Shahu

Population (2006)
  - Total: 59
- Time zone: UTC+3:30 (IRST)
  - Summer (DST): UTC+4:30 (IRDT)

Khanabad (Persian: خان آباد, also Romanized as Khānābād) is a village in Shahu Rural District, in the Central District of Kamyaran County, Kurdistan Province, Iran. At the 2006 census, its population was 59, in 15 families. The village is populated by Kurds.
