= Khanapur-M-Tadakod =

- Village
- Country: India
- State: Karnataka
- District: Dharwad

Government
  - Type: Panchayat raj
  - Body: Gram panchayat

Population (2011)
  - Total: 723

Languages
  - Official: Kannada
- Time zone: UTC+5:30 (IST)
- ISO 3166 code: IN-KA
- Vehicle registration: KA
- Website: karnataka.gov.in

Khanapur-M-Tadakod is a village in Dharwad district of Karnataka, India.

== Demographics ==
As of the 2011 Census of India there were 144 households in Khanapur-M-Tadakod and a total population of 723 consisting of 378 males and 345 females. There were 87 children ages 0-6.
