= Narendra Nagar (politician) =

Indian politician

Member of Rajasthan Legislative Assembly
- In office 2013–2023
- Preceded by: Anil Kumar
- Succeeded by: Suresh Gurjar
- Constituency: Khanapur
- In office 2003–2008
- Preceded by: Minakshe Chandrawat
- Succeeded by: Anil Kumar
- Constituency: Khanapur

Personal details
- Born: 10 October 1960 (age 65) Khanpur Jhalawar
- Party: Bhartiya Janta Party, Janata Party
- Education: Graduation in 1990

Narendra Nagar is an Indian politician formerly with the Bhartiya Janata Party. Nagar was elected to Rajasthan Legislative Assembly in 2008 from Khanpur in Jhalawar district on the BJP ticket.

== Early life and education ==
Nagar graduated from Maharishi Dyanand Saraswati University, Ajmer in 1990.
