= Siddhanath Temple, Nemawar =

Coordinates: 22.4931°N 76.9780°E

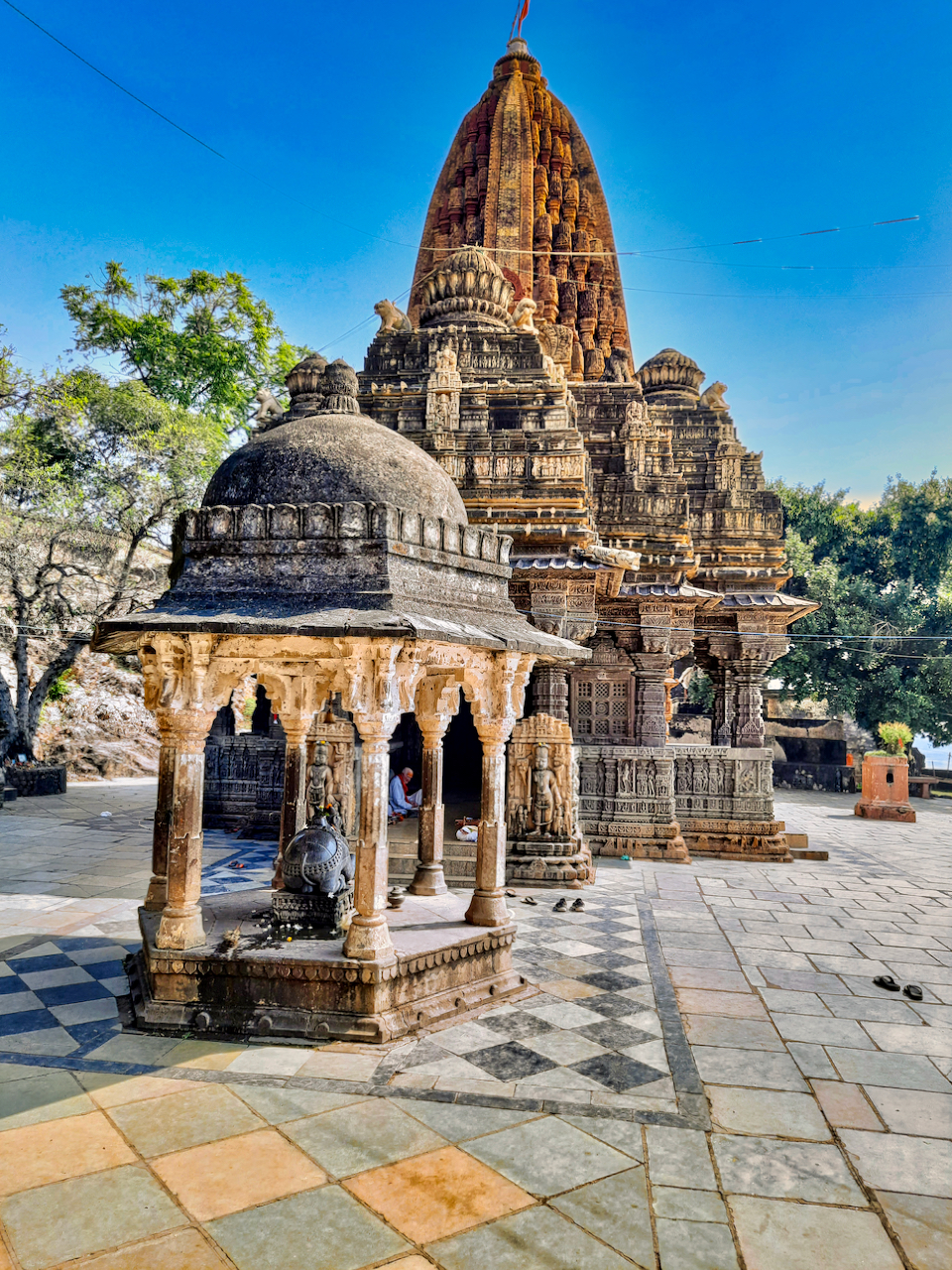

Religion
- Affiliation: Hinduism
- Deity: Shiva

Location
- Location: Nemawar, Madhya Pradesh
- Country: India

Monument of National Importance
- Official name: Sidheshwara Temple
- Reference no.: N-MP-54

Siddhanath Temple, also known as the Sidheshwara Temple, is a temple located in Nemawar, in the Indian state of Madhya Pradesh. Dating back to the 10th century, it forms an important example of Paramara architecture. Standing upon a plinth on the banks of the Narmada River, the temple is built out of yellow and blush sandstone. It is of the Nagara form, composed of a mandapa, ante-chamber, and sanctum. The exterior of the temple is elaborately carved, with Shaivite imagery most prominently displayed. The temple is dedicated to Shiva, and remains in active worship. It is listed as a Monument of National Importance.

== History ==
The temple is dated to about the 10th century CE. Two pilgrims' records found in the mandapa, which is a later addition are dated Samvat 1253 and 1281 (corresponding to 1196-97 and 1223-24 CE).

The temple notably escaped injury during the Muslim invasions. It remained in active worship during the British period, when the area was part of the Indore State, and was managed by the state government.

== Description ==
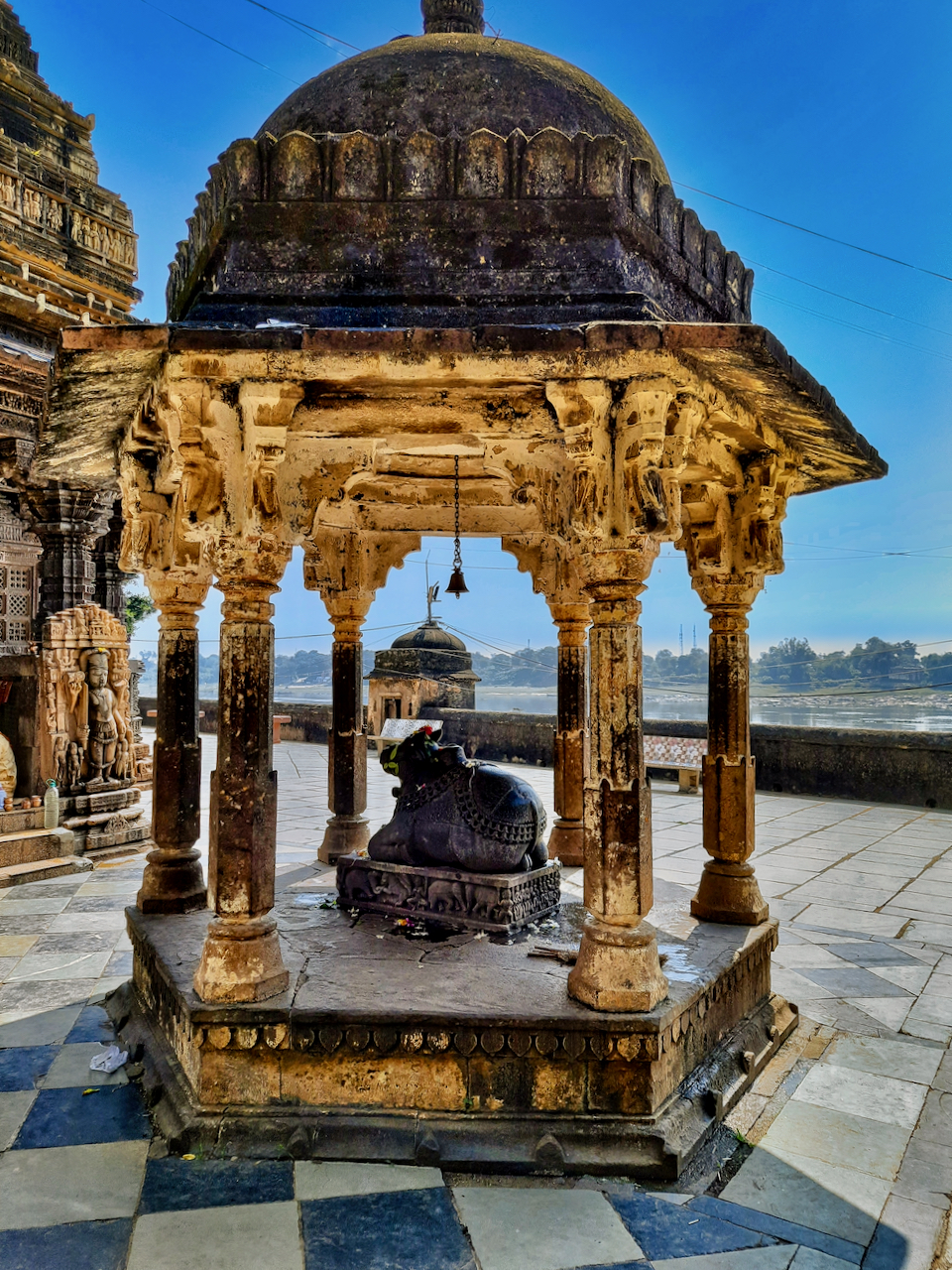
A chhatri built over the sculpture of Nandi facing the temple

The temple is located in Nemawar, a small town on the banks of the Narmada River. Due to the amount of stone sculptures excavated from the surrounding area, researchers infer that it must have been the location of a cluster of temples. There is one other surviving temple from the same period, which is unfinished, and is located upon a mound towards the north of the Siddhanath temple. Together, these temples are an importance example of a distinct school of architecture which developed during the reign of the Paramara dynasty of Malwa.

The west-facing temple stands upon a four-sided paved courtyard, on the banks of the Narmada. A wall is built towards the side facing the river. It is built in a Nagara style, and consists of a mandapa (pillared hall), antarala (ante-chamber), and garbhagriha (sanctum). The temple is built out of yellow sandstone, except for the mandapa, which is a later addition built of blush sandstone. Both these materials were probably sourced locally, as the area has many sandstone quarries.

=== Mandapa ===
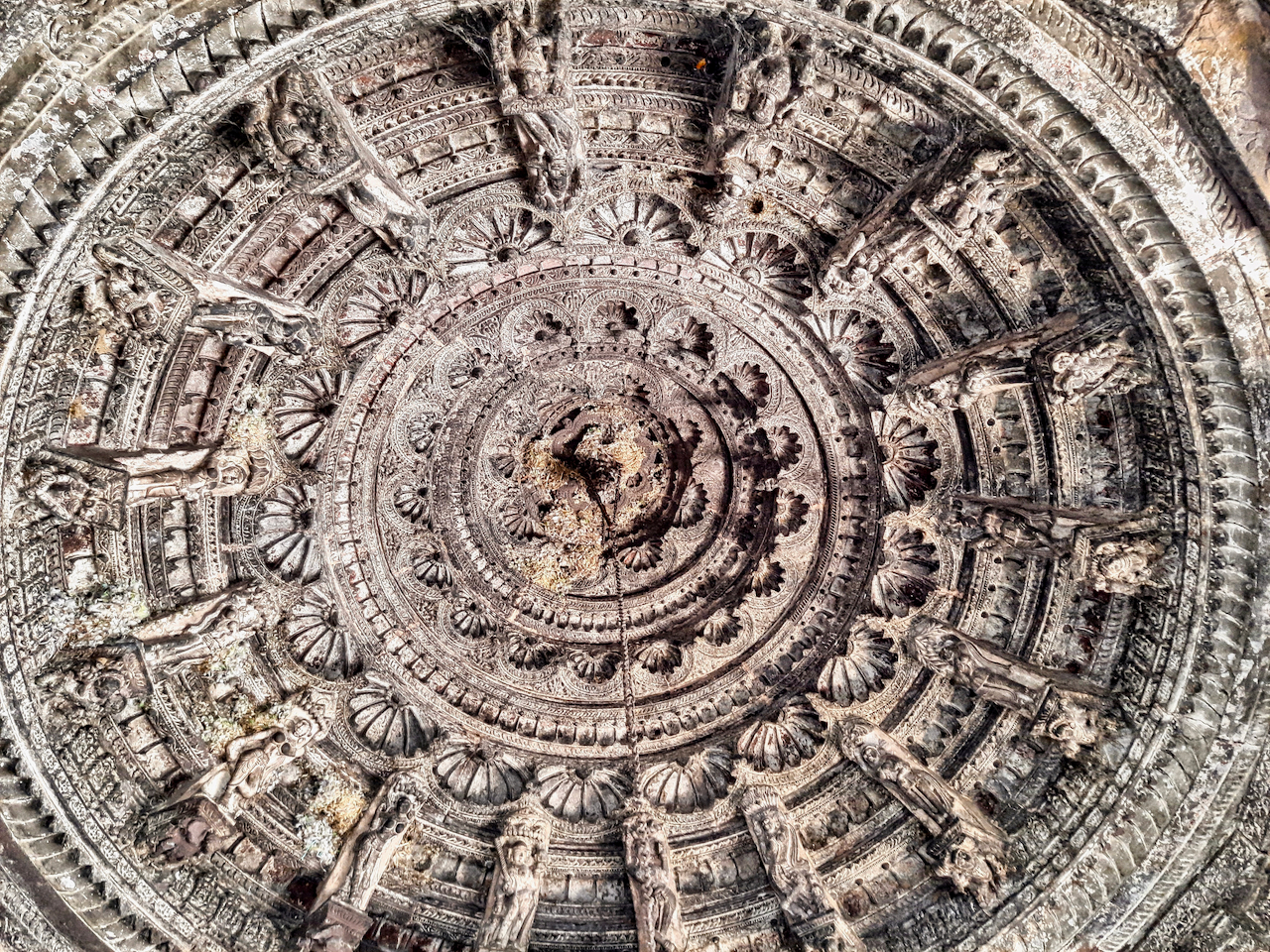
The ceiling of the mandapa. The interior of the dome, supported by sixteen brackets with carved apsaras is seen.

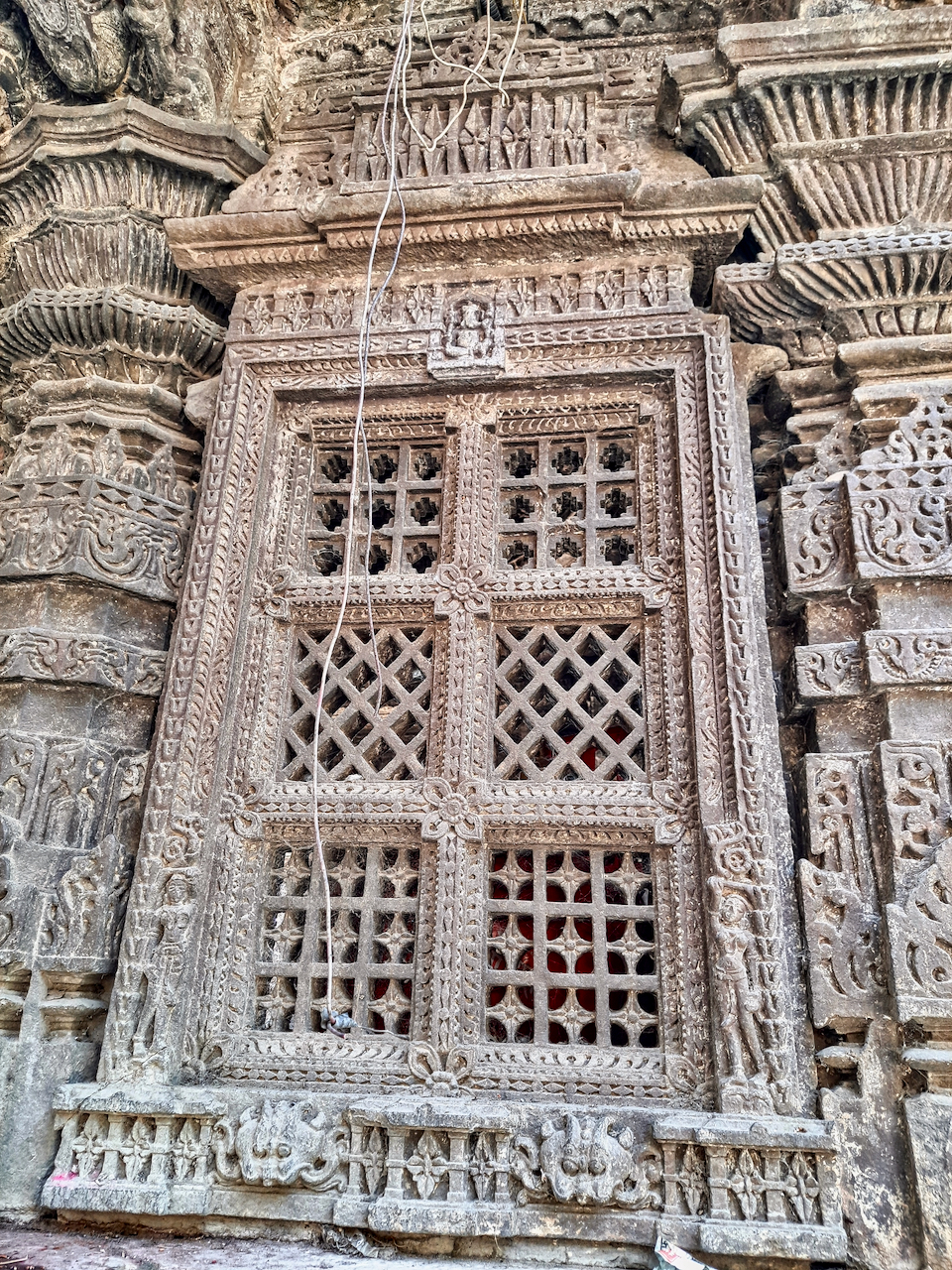
Stone jalis used to decorate the intermediate space between the smaller pillars of the mandapa

The mandapa is a later addition, appearing to have been built about a hundred years after the main shrine. It is built entirely of blush sandstone; However, one-third of the plinth upon which it stands is built out of yellow sandstone, the same as the sanctum and temple tower. This suggests that the original mandapa might have been built of yellow sandstone at the same time as the rest of the temple.

There are three mukha-mandapas (open porches) on three sides of the pillared hall, each supported by four carved pillars. Images of gods and goddesses are carved in relief in large niches below each of these pillars. These include Kali, Ganesha, as well as some of the Matrikas. Stone benches without backrests are provided on each side of these porches. Below the benches is a dado, composed of two horizontal bands of carvings. These consist of panels and sunken niches. The lower band contains seated male and female figures. The upper band contains female figures in the panels, while divine or semi-divine figures are carved into the niches.

The sabha-mandapa (main pillared hall) is square in plan. Its ceiling is supported by two main pillars in front of the ante-chamber, and ten smaller pillars. Intermediate spaces between the smaller pillars are adorned with stone jalis. These pillars support the frames upon which a trabeate dome rests. The first frame is square, on which rests an octagonal frame. Upon this is a sixteen-sided frame, supported by sixteen brackets which have carved apsaras. This frame supports the dome, which on the interior has concentric circles in the style of the Dilwara temples.

The upper part of the mandapa seems to have been built much later during the medieval period. It consists of several domes, along with a small shrine in the middle. This provides access to the chamber located above the sanctum.

=== Sanctum doorway ===
The mandapa leads to the ante-chamber, whose ceiling is adorned by five carved lotuses. The ante-chamber contains the entrance to the sanctum. This doorway is embellished with eight vertical and three horizontal bands of carvings. The first three bands are composed of a meandering creeper design, a row of flying figures, and a row of lotus petals. The fourth is a pilaster in high relief, similar to the ones found in later medieval temples. The fifth band has a row of human figures with clasped hands. The sixth has a meandering creeper design like the first one, and the final two bands are composed of rows of lotus petals.

Three of the bands are carried overhead horizontally. Above the third vertical band is the lintel, consisting of nine niches, with two round pilasters flanking each niche. The central niche contains the image of a four-handed Shiva, with a veena in two hands and a damru along with a skull cup in the other two. The other niches contain the Matrikas. A carved image of Ganesha is present on a projecting roof below the lintel.

=== Sanctum ===
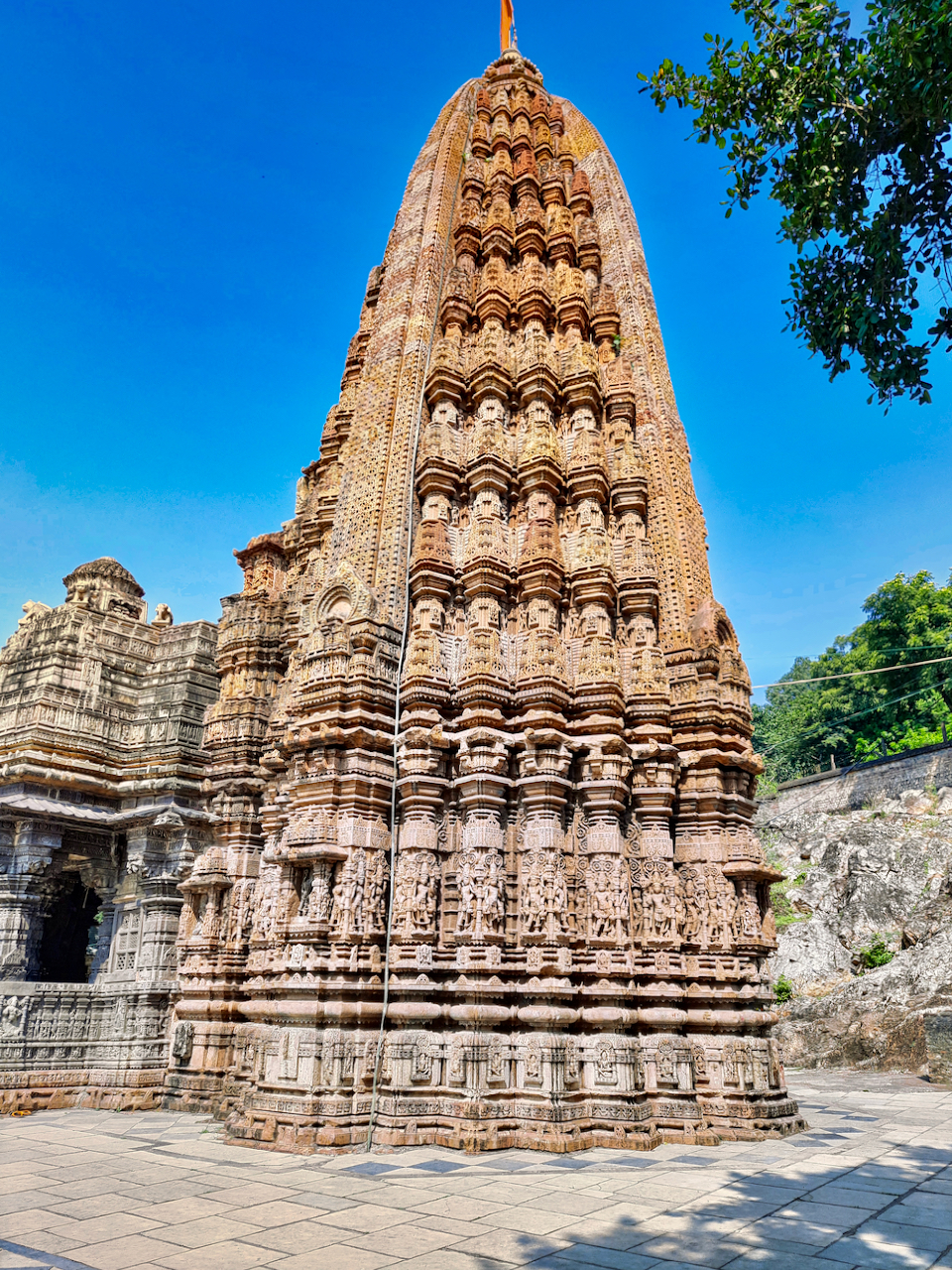
The temple, viewed from the south-east. The elaborate carvings on the exterior of the garbhagirha continue on the temple tower, which rises above it.

While the interior of the garbhagirha is of a square plan, its exterior has four projections. The lowermost band is composed of kirtimukhas. Above this is a row consisting of a series of anthropomorphic figures. Over this are ninety-nine panels containing carvings of divine and semi-divine beings. These carvings are of the Shivaganas, or companions of Shiva. These are similar to the carvings of the Kandariya Mahadeva Temple, except that this temple does not have erotic scenes carved.

The lingam is placed within the sanctum.

=== Shikhara ===
The shikhara or temple tower rises above the sanctum. The tapering tower has two circular bands at the top, with human faces carved on the upper band. It is surmounted by an amalaka, with a kalasa at the top.

== Bibliography ==
- Dhariwal, L. C. (1931). Indore State Gazetteer (Revised and Enlarged). Vol. II: Archaeology. Superintendent Holkar Government Press. pp. 48–53.
- Marshall, John (1923). Annual Report of the Director-General of Archaeology in India, 1920-1921 (PDF). Calcutta: Superintendent Government Printing. p. 32.
- Banerji, A. C. (1934). "The Temples at Nemawar". The Modern Review. pp. 61–65.
