= Khanna, Firozpur =

Khanna
- village
- Location in Punjab, India Khanna (India)
- Coordinates: 31.07888667°N 75.13240814°E
- Country: India
- State: Punjab
- District: Firozpur
- Tehsil: Zira
- Elevation: 212 m (696 ft)

Population (2011)
  - Total: 1,123
- Time zone: UTC+5:30 (IST)
- 2011 census code: 34231

Khanna is a village in the Firozpur district of Punjab, India. It is located in the Zira tehsil.

== Demographics ==
According to the 2011 census of India, Khanna has 200 households. The effective literacy rate (i.e. the literacy rate of population excluding children aged 6 and below) is 63.86%.

Demographics (2011 Census)
	Total	Male	Female
Population	1123	567	556
Children aged below 6 years	113	58	55
Scheduled caste	778	388	390
Scheduled tribe	0	0	0
Literates	645	367	278
Workers (all)	354	313	41
Main workers (total)	145	131	14
Main workers: Cultivators	77	75	2
Main workers: Agricultural labourers	36	30	6
Main workers: Household industry workers	12	12	0
Main workers: Other	20	14	6
Marginal workers (total)	209	182	27
Marginal workers: Cultivators	100	89	11
Marginal workers: Agricultural labourers	101	85	16
Marginal workers: Household industry workers	2	2	0
Marginal workers: Others	6	6	0
Non-workers	769	254	515
