= Khanpur Mahar =

- Town
- Location within Pakistan
- Coordinates: 28.10°N 69.44°E
- Country: Pakistan
- Province: Sindh
- District: Ghotki
- Elevation: 64 m (210 ft)

Population (1998)
  - Total: N/A
  - Density: 20,000/km^{2} (52,000/sq mi)
- Time zone: UTC+5 (PST)
- PTCL Calling code: 0723
- Number of Union councils: 1

Khanpur Mahar (Sindhi: خانپور مھر) is a town in Ghotki District in Northern Sindh province, Pakistan.
