= Khanpur, Rajasthan Assembly constituency =

Legislative Assembly constituency in Rajasthan State, India

Coordinates: 24.73°N 76.4°E

Khanpur
- Constituency No. 199 for the Rajasthan Legislative Assembly

Constituency details
- Country: India
- Region: North India
- State: Rajasthan
- District: Jhalawar
- Lok Sabha constituency: Jhalawar–Baran
- Established: 1951
- Total electors: 247,156
- Reservation: None

Member of Legislative Assembly
- 16th Rajasthan Legislative Assembly
- Incumbent Suresh Gurjar
- Party: Indian National Congress
- Elected year: 2023

Khanpur Assembly constituency is one of the 200 Legislative Assembly constituencies of Rajasthan state in India.

It is part of Jhalawar district.

== Birth and extent of the constituency ==
The constituency was created by The Delimitation of Parliamentary and Assembly Constituencies Order, 1951. It had its first election in 1951. As of the latest delimitation in 2008, it consists of Khanpur tehsil and parts of Jhalrapatan tehsil (including Mandawar, Ratlai, Salawad, Bakani, Reechwa ILRCs and Gagron and Govindpura Patwari Circles of Jhalawar ILRC).

== Members of the Legislative Assembly ==
Year	Member	Party
1951	Bhairav Lal	Indian National Congress
1962	Prabhu Lal Senter	Independent politician
1967	H. Chandra	Bharatiya Jana Sangh
1967 (By Poll)	S.Kumari	Bharatiya Jana Sangh
1972	Gauri Shanker	Indian National Congress
1977	Bhairav Lal	Janata Party
1980	Prithvi Singh	Indian National Congress
1985	Harish	Bharatiya Janata Party
1990	Chaturbhuj	Bharatiya Janata Party
1993	Bharat Singh	Indian National Congress
1998	Minakshee Chandrawat	Indian National Congress
2003	Narendra Nagar	Bharatiya Janata Party
2008	Anil Jain	Bharatiya Janata Party
2013	Narendra Nagar	Bharatiya Janata Party
2018	Narendra Nagar	Bharatiya Janata Party
2023	Suresh Gurjar	Indian National Congress

== Election results ==
=== 2023 ===
2023 Rajasthan Legislative Assembly election: Khanpur
Party	Candidate	Votes	%	±%
INC	Suresh Gurjar	101,045	49.76	▲4.08
BJP	Narendra Nagar	92,620	45.61	▼1.31
AAP	Deepesh Kumar	2,634	1.3	
NOTA	None of the above	2,106	1.04	▼0.28
Majority		8,425	4.15	▲2.91
Turnout		203,064	82.16	▲1.64
INC gain from BJP		Swing	▲2.91	

=== 2018 ===
2018 Rajasthan Legislative Assembly election: Khanpur
Party	Candidate	Votes	%	±%
BJP	Narendra Nagar	85,984	46.92	
INC	Suresh Gurjar	83,719	45.68	
Independent	Arjun Singh Gaur	5,534	3.02	
BSP	Mohan Lal	1,756	0.96	
NOTA	None of the above	2,415	1.32	
Majority		2,265	1.24	
Turnout		183,254	80.52	
BJP hold		Swing	▼17.91	

=== 2013 ===
2013 Rajasthan Legislative Assembly election: Khanpur
Party	Candidate	Votes	%	±%
BJP	Narendra Nagar	73,955	45.75%	−3.00%
INC	Sanjay Gurjar	42,999	26.60%	−18.35%
NPP	Anil Jain	33,624	20.80%	N/A
Independent	Anil Kumar	5,324	3.29%	N/A
NOTA	None of the Above	2,874	1.78%	+1.78%
BSP	Ramswaroop Bairwa	1,639	1.01%	−1.26%
Independent	Rajesh Singhvi	1,220	0.75%	N/A
Majority		30,956	19.15%	+15.35%
Turnout		1,61,835	81.00%	+10.61%
BJP hold		Swing	▲15.35	

=== 2008 ===
2008 Rajasthan Legislative Assembly election: Khanpur
Party	Candidate	Votes	%	±%
BJP	Anil	63,664	48.75%	+10.67%
INC	Meenakshi Chandrawat	58,709	44.95%	+14.45%
BSP	Mohan Lal Bhil	2,959	2.27%	N/A
ABCD	Ramswaroop Bairwa	2,807	2.15%	N/A
JD(S)	Ram Pratap	1,015	0.78%	N/A
BJSH	Arvind Singh	532	0.41%	N/A
BBP	Nathu Lal	473	0.36%	N/A
SP	Abdul Farid Khan	441	0.34%	N/A
Majority		4,955	3.80%	−3.78%
Turnout		1,30,600	70.39%	+0.71%
BJP hold		Swing	▼3.78	

== See also ==
- List of constituencies of the Rajasthan Legislative Assembly
- Jhalawar district
