= Xanabad, Yevlakh =

Xanabad
- Municipality
- Location within Azerbaijan
- Coordinates: 40°47′32″N 47°10′35″E
- Country: Azerbaijan
- Rayon: Yevlakh

Population
  - Total: 1,699
- Time zone: UTC+4 (AZT)
  - Summer (DST): UTC+5 (AZT)

Xanabad (also, Khanabad) is a village and municipality in the Yevlakh Rayon of Azerbaijan. It has a population of 1,699.
