= Khanabad, Azad Kashmir =

Coordinates: 33.291°N 73.767°E

Khanabad is a village in Mirpur District, Azad Kashmir, Pakistan. It lies between Chakswari and Dadyal.

Khanabad has a population of 500 British and non-British citizens. It is an expanding settlement, with property owners mainly from Britain.
