= Khanagaon, Belagavi district =

Village in Karnataka, India

Coordinates: 20°30′N 78°37′E

Khangaon is a village in Gokak taluk, Belagavi district of Karnataka, India. As of the 2011 Census of India, the village comprised 2,775.8 hectares (6,859 acres), with a population of 3062 people across 609 households.
