= U Khanapur =

- Village
- Location in Karnataka, India U Khanapur (India)
- Coordinates: 16.29°N 74.60°E
- Country: India
- State: Karnataka
- District: Belgaum
- Talukas: Hukkeri

Population (2001)
  - Total: 6,571

Languages
  - Official: Kannada
- Time zone: UTC+5:30 (IST)
- Postal code: 591221

U Khanapur is a village in the southern state of Karnataka, India. It is located in the Hukeri taluk of Belgaum district in Karnataka.

== Demographics ==
As of 2011 India census, U Khanapur has a population of 7392 with 3684 males and 3708 females.

== See also ==
- Sankeshwar
- Hukeri
- Belgaum
- Karnataka
- Districts of Karnataka
