= Bhood =

Village in Maharashtra

- Village
- Location within Maharashtra Location within India
- Coordinates: 17°20′11″N 74°41′3″E
- Country: India
- State: Maharashtra
- District: Sangli
- Taluka: Khanapur (Vita)

Government
  - Type: Grampanchayat

Area
  - Total: 15.16 km^{2} (5.85 sq mi)
- Elevation: 785 m (2,575 ft)

Population (2011)
  - Total: 1,889
  - Density: 124.6/km^{2} (322.7/sq mi)
  - Literacy: 76.62%

Sex ratio
  - 1104/1000: Female/Male

Language
  - Official: Marathi
- Time zone: UTC+5:30 (IST)
- PIN: 415309
- STD Code: +91-2347
- Vehicle registration: MH-10 (Sangli)
- Website: www.bhood.in

Bhood is a village in Khanapur tehsil of Sangli district in Maharashtra, India. It is located near the city Vita.

The population of Bhood is 1,889 according to the 2011 Census, with agriculture being the prime occupation of the village's residents. Some residents are also employed at a Gold Refinery and the Jewellery business. Bhood is recipient of the Nirmal Gram Purskar in Sant Gadage Baba Gram Swachata Abhiyan.

== Climate ==
Bhood

Climate chart (precipitation, max. and min. temperature)
J	F	M	A	M	J	J	A	S	O	N	D
0 31 12	1 33 15	4 36 18	30 38 21	44 37 22	86 31 22	98 28 21	72 28 21	139 30 20	163 32 19	9 30 16	0 30 13
- █ Average max. and min. temperatures in °C
- █ Precipitation totals in mm
- Source: IMD
Imperial conversion
J	F	M	A	M	J	J	A	S	O	N	D
0 88 54	0 91 59	0.2 97 64	1.2 100 70	1.7 99 72	3.4 88 72	3.9 82 70	2.8 82 70	5.5 86 68	6.4 90 66	0.4 86 61	0 86 55
- █ Average max. and min. temperatures in °F
- █ Precipitation totals in inches

The village has a semi arid, hot and dry climate consisting of mainly three seasons. Summers are long, ranging almost five months from mid February to June. Temperatures in summer fall between 35 °C (95 °F) - 40 °C (104 °F). However, it may reach higher than 40 °C in searching summer. May is the hottest month of a year with an average day temperature of 37 °C (98.6 °F) in the village. Winters are short with temperatures ranging within 15 °C (59 °F) - 21 °C (69.8 °F). December is the coldest month in a year. Relative humidity in winter is the lowest and December is the driest month in a year with the relative humidity as low as 30%. Rains are scarce and occur only during the Monsoon from mid June to September. Annual average rainfall is about 25.5 inches (647.7 mm). September gets the maximum rainfall in a year while July has the maximum rainy days.

Climate data for Bhood
Month	Jan	Feb	Mar	Apr	May	Jun	Jul	Aug	Sep	Oct	Nov	Dec	Year
Mean daily maximum °C (°F)	31 (88)	33 (91)	36 (97)	38 (100)	37 (99)	31 (88)	28 (82)	28 (82)	30 (86)	32 (90)	30 (86)	30 (86)	32 (90)
Mean daily minimum °C (°F)	12 (54)	15 (59)	18 (64)	21 (70)	22 (72)	22 (72)	21 (70)	21 (70)	20 (68)	19 (66)	16 (61)	13 (55)	18 (65)
Average precipitation mm (inches)	3.8 (0.15)	0.5 (0.02)	5.3 (0.21)	22.1 (0.87)	48.3 (1.90)	71.1 (2.80)	108.7 (4.28)	79.8 (3.14)	99.6 (3.92)	88.9 (3.50)	33.5 (1.32)	6.9 (0.27)	568.5 (22.38)
Source: Government of Maharashtra

== Location ==
Bhood is located in south-western Maharashtra at 17°20′11″N 74°41′3″E in Khanapur (Vita) tehsil of the Sangli district.

== Government and politics ==
=== Local administration ===
The Grampanchayat Bhood is the administrative body for the village which is directly responsible for the affairs within the village. The village has been divided into 3 Wards, each ward has its 3 elected representatives called 'Gramsadasy' or 'punch'. The gramsadasy elect the 'Sirpunch' of the Grampanchayat which is head of the Grampanchayat. The Grampanchayat elections are held after every five years. The Grampanchayat Bhood is working with Zilla Parishad, Sangli and Panchayat samiti, Vita. Bhood is under the Lengare division for Zilla parishad, Sangli and Panchayat samiti, Vita.

=== State and central administration ===
Bhood is under the Pune division. Pune division is one of the six administrative divisions of Maharashtra state in India. Bhood is under the Sangli Lok Sabha constituency and Khanapur-Atpadi Vidhan Sabha constituency. MDDS e-Governance code for Bhood is 27 531 04299 568523.

=== Judiciary ===
Bhood is under the jurisdictional area of Bombay High Court. District level court is in Sangli (Sangli district court). And tehsil level court is in Vita. The village is under the working area of Vita police station.

== Transportation ==
=== Road ===
Bhood is connected by road to the nearest village Lengare located at a distance of (5 km) by the Bhood-Lengare road which further connects to the Vita city. Bhood is at a distance of 275 km south-west of Mumbai, 73 km north of Sangli and 18 km from Vita. The nearest villages and towns are Khanapur (10 km), Lengare, and Kharsundi (13 km). Bhood has bus stand served by the buses of Maharashtra State Road Transport Corporation.

=== Railway ===
Nearest railway station is Karad (55 km). Miraj railway junction is 65 km from Bhood. Trains to all major cities in India are available from Karad and Miraj railway stations.

=== Air ===
Nearest domestic airport from Bhood is Kolhapur (90 km). Kolhapur airport located at Ujalaiwadi, 9 km South-east from the Kolhapur city. Its sole regular service to Mumbai by Kingfisher Airlines ceased in November 2011 when the airline pulled out of several towns like Kolhapur due to its financial crisis. Pune Airport located at a distance of 175 km by road from Bhood is the nearest functional airport. It has regular service to all major cities in India.

== Demographics ==
Population Growth
Year	Pop.	±%
1991	1,395	—
2001	1,889	+35.4%
2011	1,889	+0.0%
Source: Census of India

Bhood has a population of 1,889. With the male population at 898 and the female at 991. There are 1,104 females per 1,000 males in the village amongst 455 households. People of various ethnic groups live in Bhood.

The census code for Bhood is 04328200 and its village code according to 2011 Census is 27 35 005 0025.

Because of its gold-refinery and jewellery business many people of Bhood are today spread throughout India. According to 1991 Census, the population of Bhood was 1395.

=== Places of worship ===
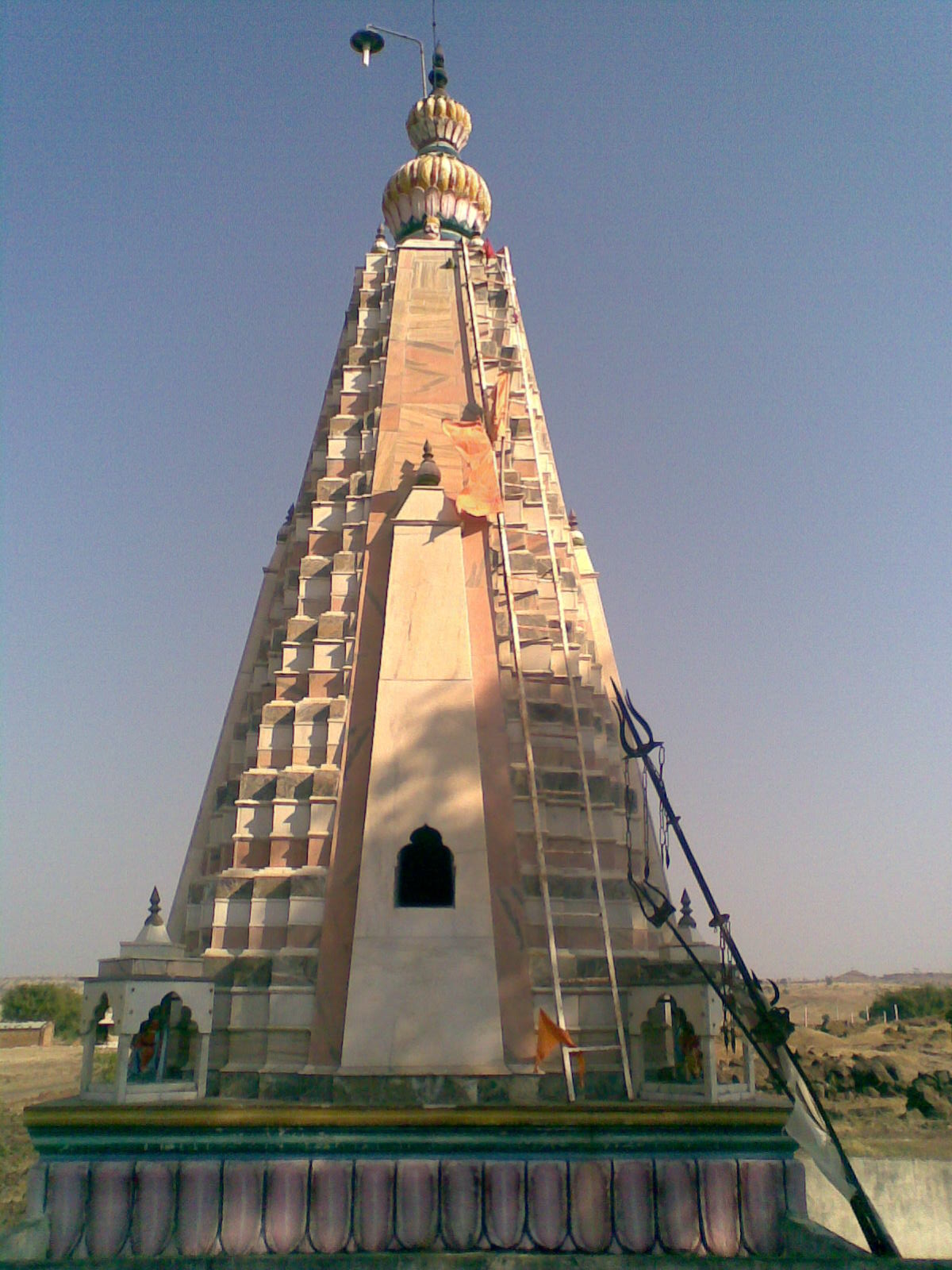
Bhoodsiddhanath Temple's shikhara

There are number of temples in Bhood. Some of them are...

- Bhoodsiddhanath Temple
- Mhaswadsidhanatha Temple
- Maruti Temple
- Jyotiba Temple
- Khandoba Temple

== Education ==
=== Schools ===
- Zila Parishad School provides primary education from class 1 to class 7. The school is governed by the Zilla Parishad of Sangli with the help of the local Panchayat samiti of Vita and the Gram panchayat of Bhood. The school is located near S.T. Stand of Bhood and is equipped with educational facilities.
- New English School provides secondary education from class 8 up to class 10 (matriculation level). The school is affiliated to the S.S.C. Board. It is situated near the Bhood-Khanapur road.

=== Colleges ===
Higher education is available in the colleges in the following localities of Bhood:

- Vita, located at the distance of 18 kilometres (11 mi) from Bhood
- Khanapur, Located 10 kilometres (6.2 mi) away from Bhood

== Gallery ==
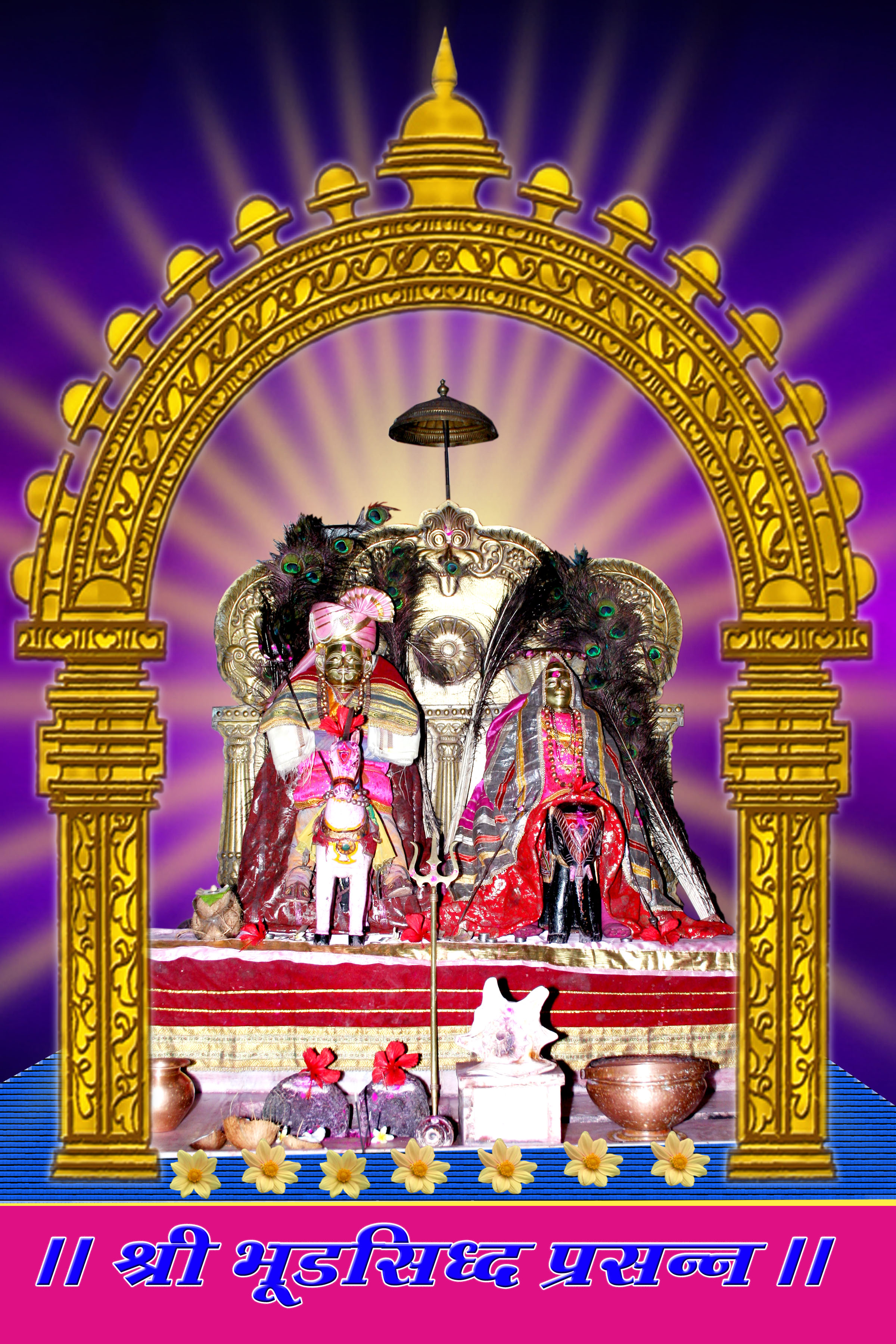
Lord Bhoodsidhhanath

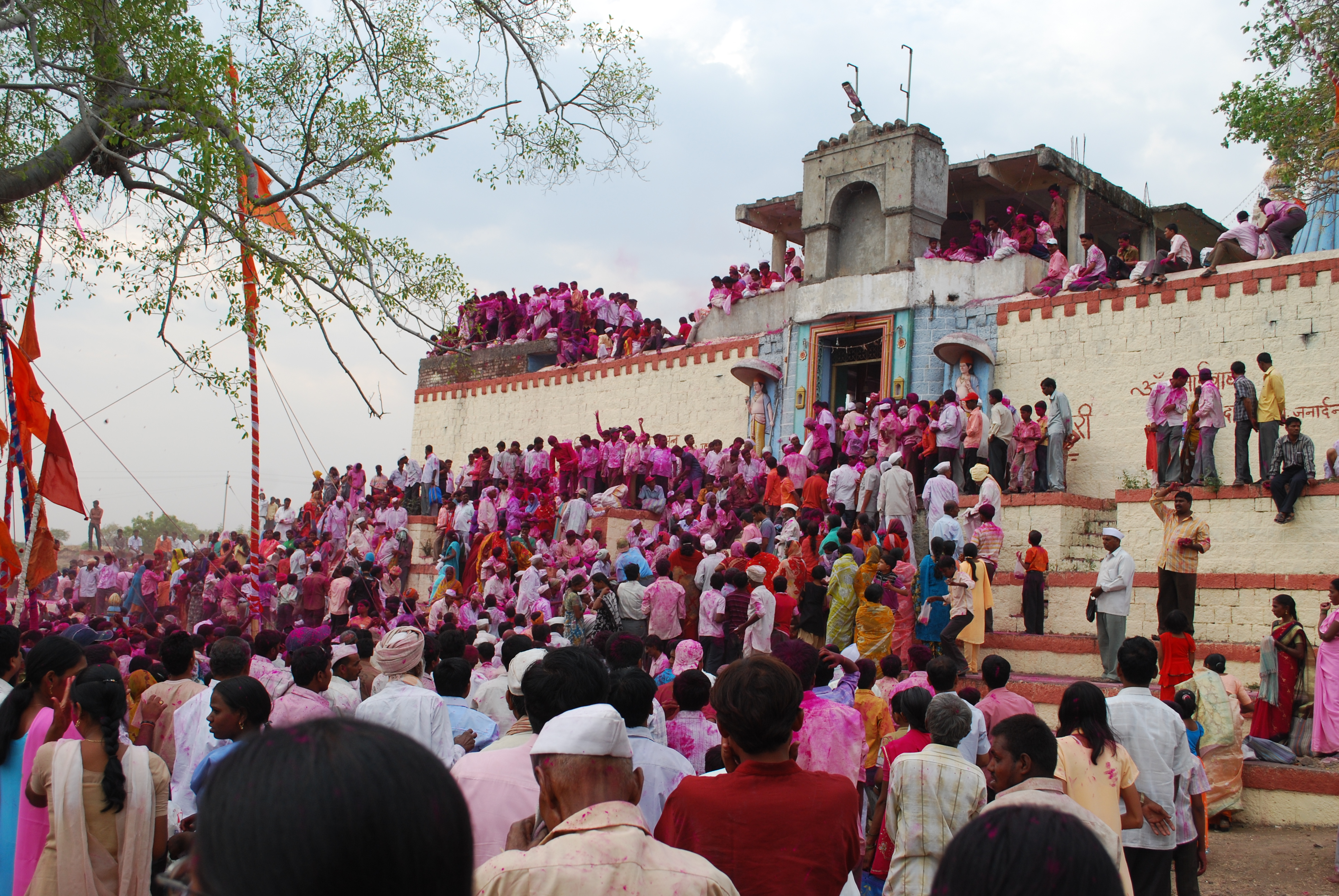
Bhoodsidhhanath temple

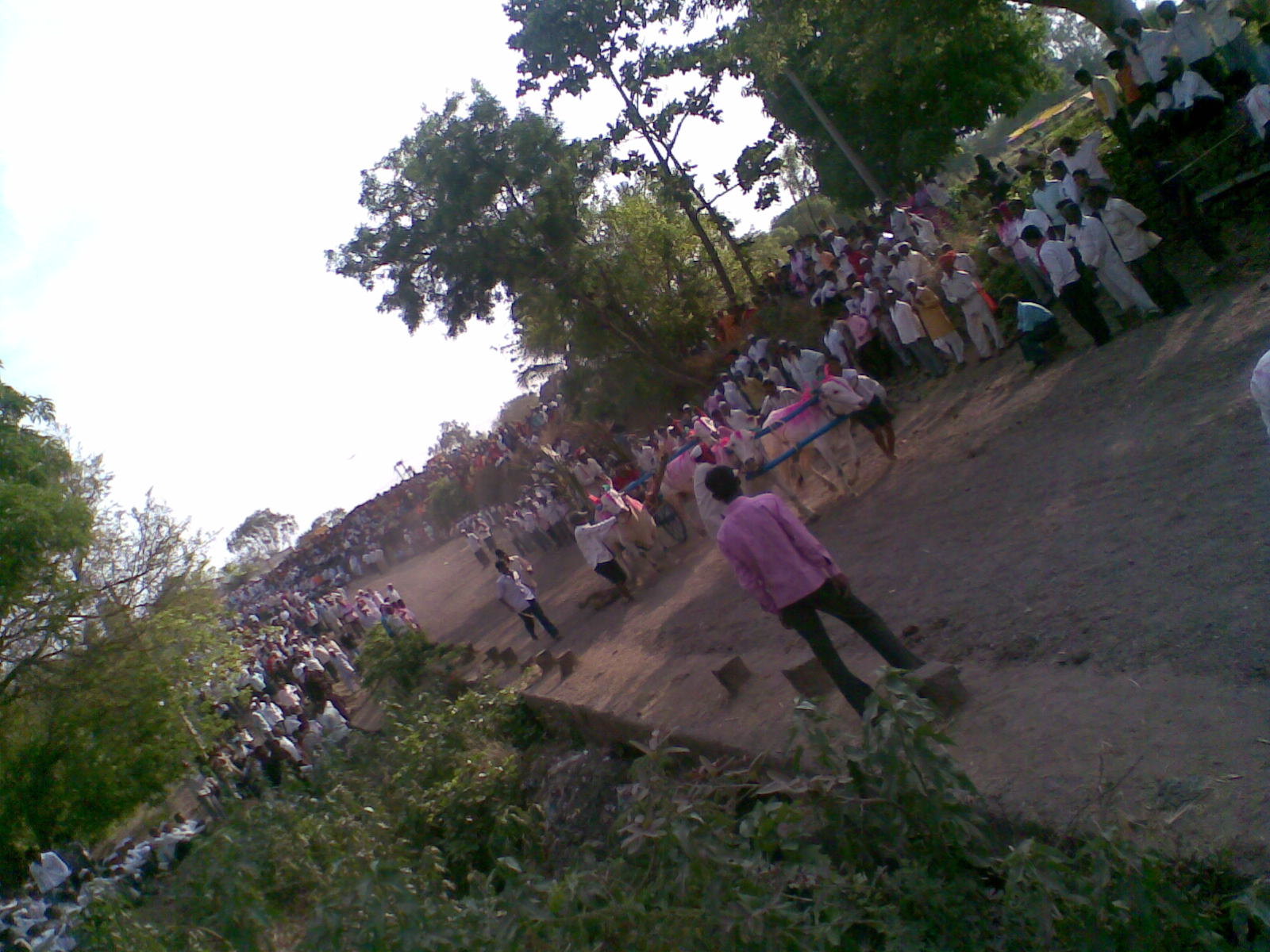
Bullock cart race in Bhood

== See also ==
- Tembhu Irrigation Project
