= Khanabad, Gilgit Baltistan =

Khana Abad خانہ آباد
- Village
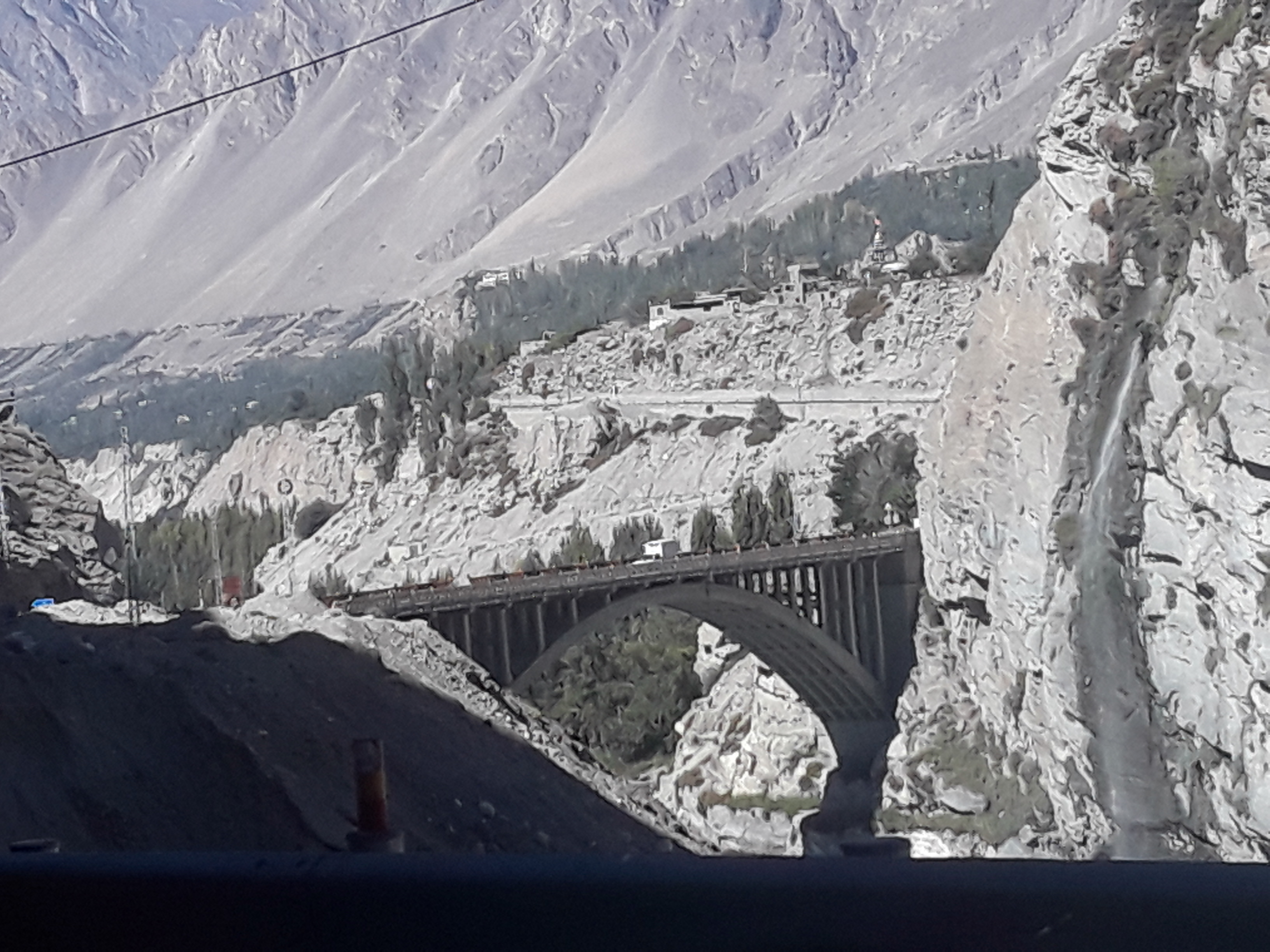
- Khanabad Suspension Bridge

- Location within Gilgit Baltistan
- Coordinates: 36.24617°N 74.4541°E
- Country: Pakistan
- Territories of Pakistan: Gilgit-Baltistan
- District: Hunza
- Established: 1902
- Elevation: 1,952 m (6,404 ft)

Population
  - Total: 2,000
- Time zone: UTC+05:00 (PKT)
- Area code: 15550

Khana Abad (Burushaski: خانہ آباد, Urdu: خانہ آباد) is a small village of lower Hunza, located in Hunza district, Gilgit-Baltistan, in Pakistan. There is a school created by Aga Khan Education Service called Diamond Jubilee Middle School. All of the people in Khanabad are Ismaili Shia and are of Dardic ethnicity. There is also a suspension bridge in Khanabad.
