= Kanpur, Odisha =

Kanpur
- Subdistrict
- Location within Odisha Location within India Location within Asia
- Coordinates: 20.4698345°N 85.1866730°E
- Country: India
- State: Odisha
- District: Kataka

Area "Area of Kanpur, Cuttack".
  - Total: 167.0 km^{2} (64.5 sq mi)
- Highest elevation: 133 m (436 ft)
- Lowest elevation: 36 m (118 ft)

Population (2011)
  - Total: 59,577
  - Density: 356.7/km^{2} (924.0/sq mi)

Languages
  - Official: Odia • Hindi • English
- Time zone: UTC+5:30 (IST)
- Vehicle registration: OD-05

Kanpur [ Khanpoor ] is a block in Cuttack District [ Now known as Kataka ] of Odisha, India. It has population of 59,577 according to the 2011 census and covers an area of 167.0 km^{2} (64.5 sq mi).

== Geography ==
Kanpur is located at 20.4698345°N 85.1866730°E. It features the Hindol-Badamba Forest range. It borders Narasinghpur to the west, Badamba to the east, and Hindol & Rasol to the north. It borders the Mahanadi river on its southern part. The Sidhamula bridge provides connectivity over the Mahanadi.

== Demographics ==
The most populated village is Kanjiapada at 2,875 people.

=== Population ===
As per the 2011 census, Kanpur had a population of 59,577 people, with males being 31,413 and females being 28,164. The children population (0-6years) is 6,578 children, making 11.04% of the population.

The expected population at 2027 is 67,000 people.

=== Religions ===
Religions in Kanpur
Religion	Percent
Hinduism	99.86%
Islam	0.04%
Christianity	0.03%
Sikhism	0.02%
Not stated	0.04%

=== Castes ===
As per 2011 census, Scheduled castes(SC) population is 11,649 people, with 6,050 being males and 5,599 being females. Scheduld castes make up 19.55% of population.

Scheduled tribes(ST) population is 1,507 people, which makes 2.53% up of the population.

=== Education ===
The overall literacy rate is 82.59%, with male literacy at 89.26% and female literacy at 75.19%

=== Area and households ===
The total area of Kanpur Subdistrict is 178.8 Square Kilometres, with a population density of 333 inhabitants per square kilometre (128.5/mi^{2}). There are 78 villages in the block. The Total Number of households are 13,640. The household Density is 4.37 people per household.

== See also ==
• Kanpur
