= Khanpur, Kapurthala =

Khanpur
- Village
- Location in Punjab, India Khanpur (India)
- Coordinates: 31.383744°N 75.223111°E
- Country: India
- State: Punjab
- District: Kapurthala

Government
  - Type: Panchayati raj (India)
  - Body: Gram panchayat

Population (2011)
  - Total: 1,154
- Sex ratio 609/545♂/♀

Languages
  - Official: Punjabi
  - Other spoken: Hindi
- Time zone: UTC+5:30 (IST)
- PIN: 144601
- Telephone code: 01822
- ISO 3166 code: IN-PB
- Vehicle registration: PB-09
- Website: kapurthala.gov.in

Khanpur is a village in Kapurthala district of Punjab State, India. It is located 16 kilometres (9.9 mi) from Kapurthala, which is both district and sub-district headquarters of Khanpur. The village is administrated by a Sarpanch who is an elected representative of village as per the constitution of India and Panchayati raj (India).

== Demography ==
According to the report published by Census India in 2011, Khanpur has 223 houses with the total population of 1,154 persons of which 609 are male and 545 females. Literacy rate of Khanpur is 69.11%, lower than the state average of 75.84%. The population of children in the age group 0–6 years is 144 which is 12.48% of the total population. Child sex ratio is approximately 946, higher than the state average of 846.

== Population data ==
Particulars	Total	Male	Female
Total No. of Houses	223	-	-
Population	1,154	609	545
Child (0–6)	144	74	70
Schedule Caste	916	486	430
Schedule Tribe	0	0	0
Literacy	69.11 %	71.59 %	66.32 %
Total Workers	525	299	226
Main Worker	522	0	0
Marginal Worker	3	2	1
