= National Highway 965 (India) =

National highway in Maharashtra, India

National Highway 965
- Map of the National Highway in red

Route information
- Auxiliary route of NH 65
- Length: 277 km (172 mi)

Major junctions
- East end: Mohol
- West end: Alandi

Location
- Country: India
- States: Maharashtra

Highway system
- Roads in India; Expressways; National; State; Asian
← NH 65	→ NH 60

National Highway 965, commonly called NH 965 is a national highway in India. It is a spur road of National Highway 65. NH-965 traverses the state of Maharashtra in India.

== Route ==
Mohol, Pandharpur, Malshiras, Phaltan, Nira, Jejuri, Saswad near Pune, Alandi.

== Junctions ==
NH 65 Terminal near Mohol and Hadapsar.
NH 965D near Nira.
NH 160 near Phaltan.
NH 60 Terminal near Alandi.

== See also ==
- List of national highways in India
- List of national highways in India by state
