= Khanpur Urf Birbhanpur =

Khanpur Urf Birbhanpur Khānpur, Bīrbhānpur
- Village
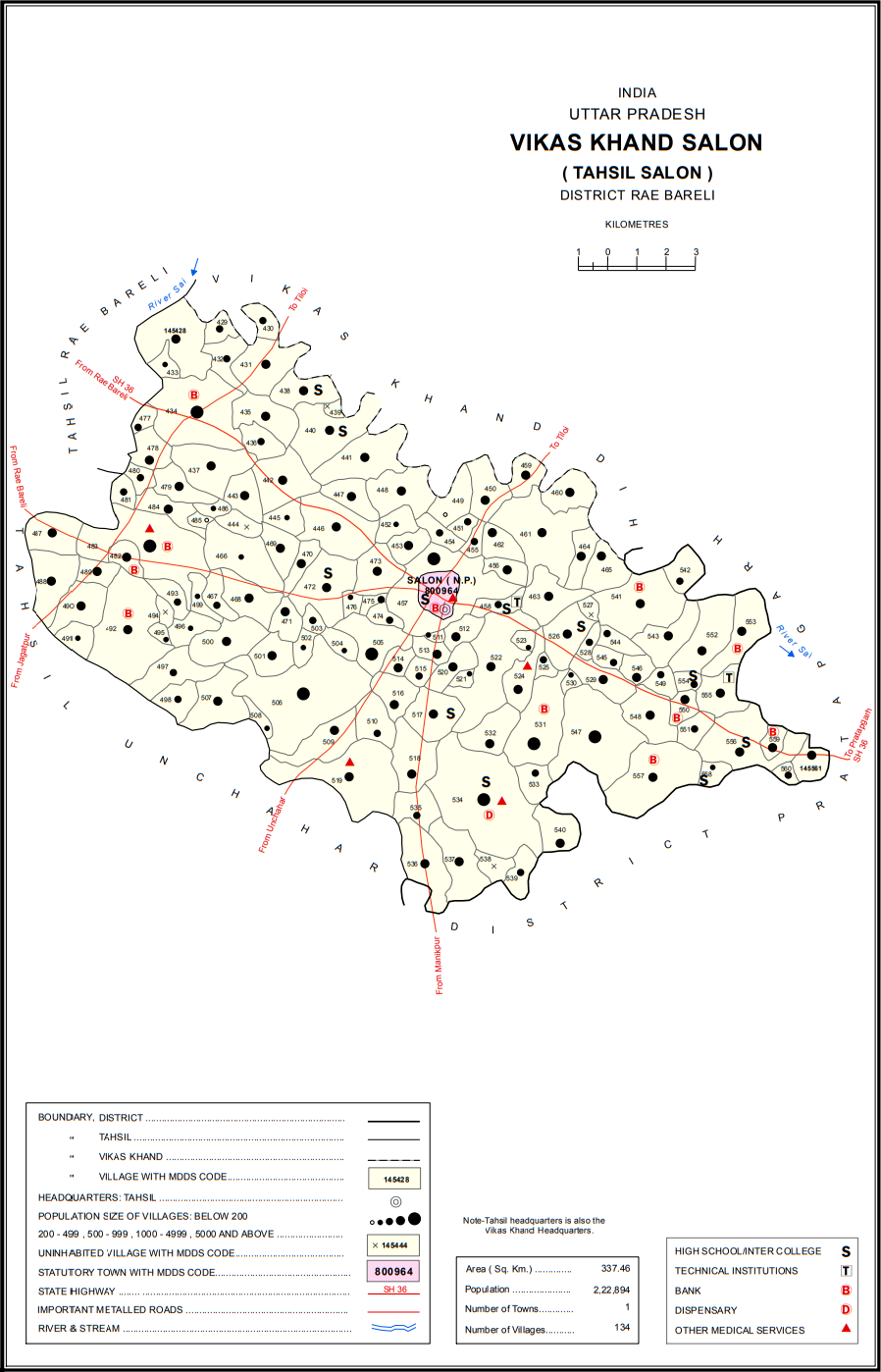
- Map showing Khanpur Urf Birbhanpur (#548) in Salon CD block

- Location in Uttar Pradesh, India
- Coordinates: 25.992082°N 81.519271°E
- Country: India
- State: Uttar Pradesh
- District: Raebareli

Area
  - Total: 2.465 km^{2} (0.952 sq mi)

Population (2011)
  - Total: 1,929
  - Density: 782.6/km^{2} (2,027/sq mi)

Languages
  - Official: Hindi
- Time zone: UTC+5:30 (IST)
- Vehicle registration: UP-35

Khanpur Urf Birbhanpur is a village in Salon block of Rae Bareli district, Uttar Pradesh, India. It is located 43 km from Raebareli, the district headquarters. As of 2011, Khanpur Urf Birbhanpur has a population of 1,929 people, in 363 households. It has one primary school and no healthcare facilities. It does not host a permanent market or a periodic haat.

The 1961 census recorded Khanpur Urf Birbhanpur as comprising 3 hamlets, with a total population of 720 people (348 male and 372 female), in 153 households and 120 physical houses. The area of the village was given as 625 acres.

The 1981 census recorded Khanpur Urf Birbhanpur as having a population of 1,041 people, in 214 households, and having an area of 252.52 hectares. The main staple foods were given as wheat and rice.
