= Renavi =

Village in Maharashtra

- village
- Location in Maharashtra, India Renavi (India)
- Coordinates: 17°16′11″N 74°36′38″E
- Country: India
- State: Maharashtra
- District: Sangli
- Talukas: Khanapur (Vita)

Government
  - Body: Grampanchayat Renavi

Area
  - Total: 16.9 km^{2} (6.5 sq mi)

Population (2001)
  - Total: 2,235
  - Density: 132/km^{2} (343/sq mi)

Languages
  - Official: Marathi
  - Spoken languages: Marathi
- Time zone: UTC+5:30 (IST)
- PIN: 415 311
- Telephone code: 91 2347
- Vehicle registration: MH 10 (Sangli)
- Nearest city: Vita
- Lok Sabha constituency: Sangli
- Vidhan Sabha constituency: Khanapur-Atpadi
- Civic agency: Grampanchayat Renavi

Renavi is a village in Sangli district, Maharashtra, India. The village has one primary school and one high school.

A local temple dedicated to the Hindu god Revansiddhanath was built in the 16th century. Revansiddha Temple is a temple to the Hindu god also known as Revansiddha. It Belongs to the Sakhare Family, built in the 16th century by Shri Yogiraj Anna Sakhare and is about three furlongs away from the village of Renavi.
