= Khanagaon (K.H.) =

- Village
- Country: India
- State: Karnataka
- District: Belgaum
- Talukas: Belgaum
- Elevation: 786 m (2,579 ft)

Languages
  - Official: Kannada
- Time zone: UTC+5:30 (IST)

Khanagaon (K.H.) is a village in Belgaum district in Karnataka, India.
