= Mhaswad =

Town in Maan taluka, Satara district, Western Maharashtra, India

Mhasvad
- Town
- Location in Maharashtra, India
- Coordinates: 17.635°N 74.787°E
- Country: India
- State: Maharashtra
- District: Satara
- Talukas: Maan/Dahivadi(Maharashtra)

Government
  - Body: Municipal Council

Population (2011)
  - Total: 39,495

Languages
  - Official: Marathi
  - Spoken languages: Marathi
- Time zone: UTC+5:30 (IST)
- PIN: 415509/415510
- Telephone code: 2373
- Vehicle registration: MH-11/satara, phalthan, dahivadi, vaduj
- Sex ratio: 1.02 ♂/♀
- Literacy: 61.37%
- Distance from Dahiwadi: 25 kilometres (16 mi) (by road)

Mhaswad or Mhasvad is a city in the Maan/Dahivadi taluka in the Satara district in the Indian state of Maharashtra. The NH-548C Satara-Baitul National Highway passes through the city.

== Demographics ==
As of 2011 India census, Mhaswad had a population of 24,120. Males constitute 12,185 of the population and females 11,935. Mhaswad has an average literacy rate of 74.11%, lower than the state average of 82.34: male literacy is 80.94%, and female literacy is 67.23%. In Mhaswad, 14% of the population is under 6 years of age.

== Shree Siddhanatha Rath Yatra ==
The famous temple of Lord Siddhanatha is located in Mhaswad. Shree Siddhanatha Rath Yatra is the major annual fair in Mhaswad.

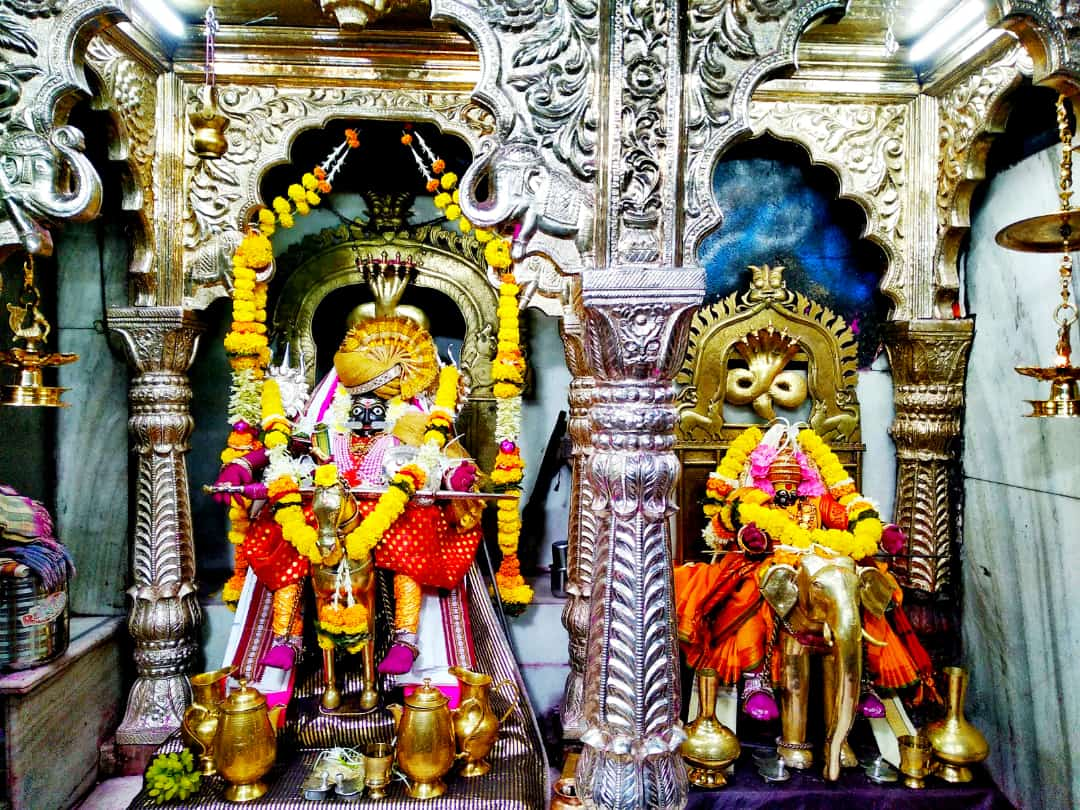
Shree Siddhanatha and Mata Jogeshwari Temple, Mhaswad

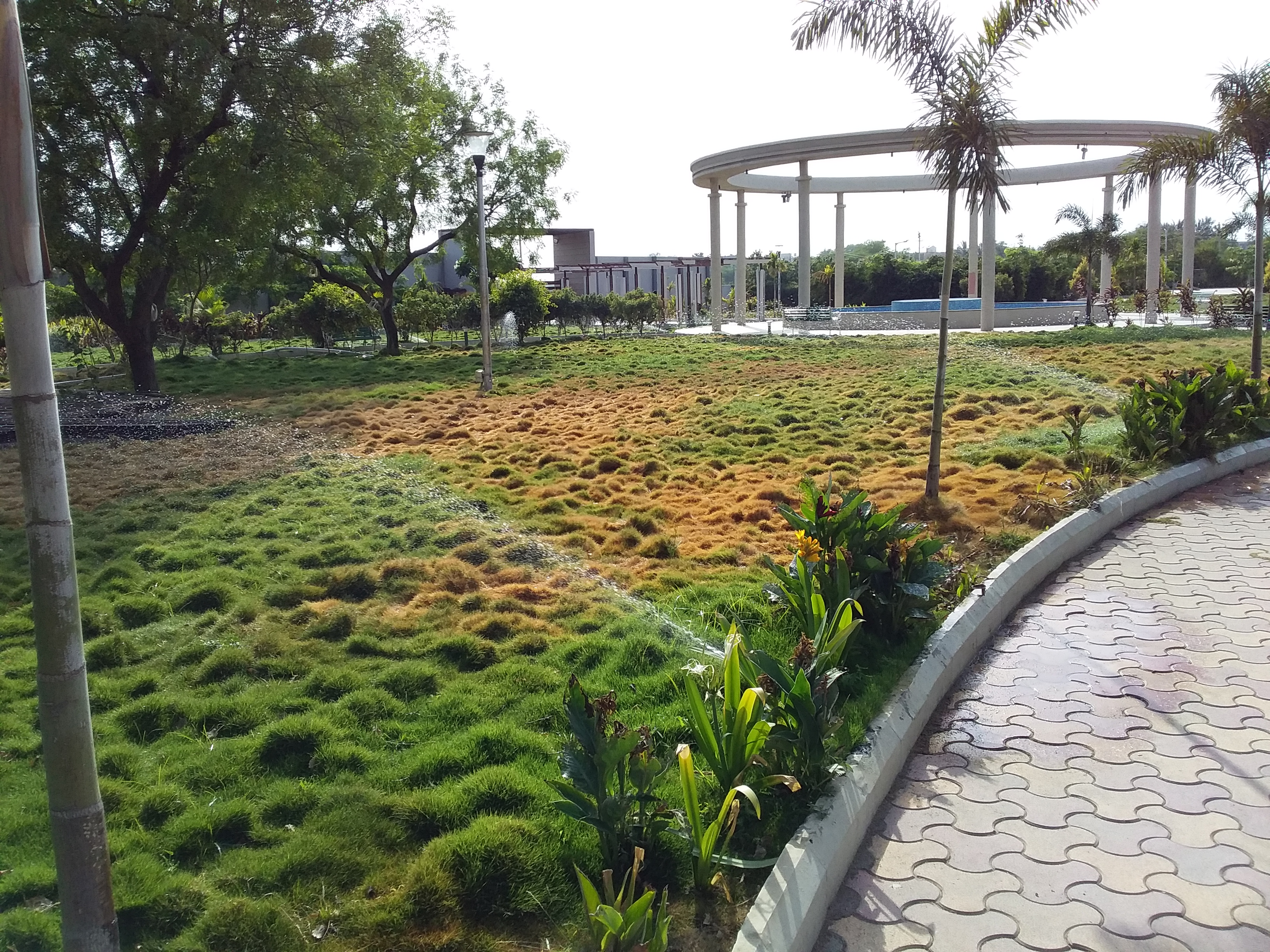
Punyashlok Rajmata Ahilyadevi Holkar Udyan, Mhaswad
