= Kanpura, Rajasthan =

Coordinates: 26°18′N 79°15′E

Kanpura
- Village
- Interactive map of Kanpura
- Country: India
- State: Rajasthan
- District: Ajmer

Languages
  - Official: Hindi
- Time zone: UTC+5:30 (IST)
- PIN: 305025

Kānpura is a town in Ajmer, Rajasthan, India.
