= Khanabad, Delfan =

Khanabad خان آباد
- Village
- Location within Iran
- Coordinates: 34°03′15″N 47°50′05″E
- Country: Iran
- Province: Lorestan
- County: Delfan
- Bakhsh: Central
- Rural District: Nurabad

Population (2006)
  - Total: 200
- Time zone: UTC+3:30 (IRST)
  - Summer (DST): UTC+4:30 (IRDT)

Khanabad (Persian: خان آباد, also Romanized as Khānābād) is a village in Nurabad Rural District, in the Central District of Delfan County, Lorestan Province, Iran. At the 2006 census, its population was 200, in 44 families.
