= Khanpur, Jhalawar =

Khanpur is a town in Jhalawar district in Rajasthan. Which is located 85 km from kota city 45 km from Baran city and 35 km from Jhalawar City.Khanpur is a tehsil headquarter.

== Demographics ==
Khanpur's population in 2011 was 13,848 people.

== Educational institutions and schools ==
- Government UG college
- Mother India TT college
- Great India TT college
- Government higher secondary school
- Tilak Senior Secondary School
- Maa Bharti Public sr.sec school
- Saint Sudha Sagar Public school
- Fairyland Sr.sec school
- Mount Sinai sec School
- Bachpan a play School
- Global public school

== Health services ==
The main hospital include: 1.Government Hospital 2.AJ Manju Hospital

== Economy ==
The town is the trade centre for an area in which Soybean, Mustard, Wheat, coriander, and oilseeds are grown. Khanpur also has some mines of stone. This stone is use in building houses. Most of the people are farmers in the rural area of Khanpur tehsil. They grow garlic, mustard, Coriander, wheat, rice, vegetables, and much more. It is also surrounded by around 200 mini-villages.
