= Vita, Maharashtra =

Vita Vite
- Town
- Location in Maharashtra, India Vita (India)
- Coordinates: 17°16′16″N 74°32′16″E
- Country: India
- State: Maharashtra
- District: Sangli
- Talukas: Khanapur (Vita)

Government
  - Body: Vita Municipal Council Mayor - Kajal Sanjay Mhetre
  - MLA: Suhas Babar

Area
  - Total: 55.3 km^{2} (21.4 sq mi)
- Elevation: 560 m (1,840 ft)

Population (2011)
  - Total: 48,289
  - Density: 873/km^{2} (2,260/sq mi)

Language
  - Official: Marathi
- Time zone: UTC+5:30 (IST)
- PIN: 415311
- Telephone code: 91(2347)
- ISO 3166 code: IN-MH
- Vehicle registration: MH-10
- Lok Sabha constituency: Sangli
- Vidhan Sabha constituency: Khanapur-Atpadi
- Civic agency: Vita Municipal Corporation

Vita, also known as Vite, is a town and a municipal council in Sangli district in the Indian state of Maharashtra. Vita is also taluka headquarters of Khanapur taluka.

== Demographics ==
As of the 2011 Indian census, Vita had a population of 48,289, of which 24,692 were males and 23,597 were females. The population in the age group of 0 to 6 years was 5,321. The average literacy rate was 77.65% of which male literacy was 81.58% and the female literacy rate was 73.57%. Scheduled Castes and Scheduled Tribes have a population of 6,628 and 402 respectively. There were 10328 households in Vita in 2011.

=== Languages ===
Marathi is the most commonly spoken language. Hindi and English were also spoken, in addition to some community-specific languages.

== Tourist attractions ==
- Revansiddha Temple
- Dargoba Mandir, Pare
- Yashwantrao Chavan Sagareshwar Wildlife Sanctuary
- Sulkai Temple

== Transport ==
=== By Road ===
Vita is connected to urban settlements like Palus (27 km), Tasgaon (32 km) and Karad (42 km) by road network.

=== By Railway ===
Nearest District HQ railway station Sangli is 53 km from Vita. Plenty of rikshas and private taxis are available from Vita to Sangli railway station. Sangli station is the nearest major railway station, about 53 km (33 mi) away on the Mumbai–Bangalore main line. Sangli railway station is also connected to the city via bus services. From Sangli railway station, there are several trains to Delhi, Mumbai, Bengaluru, Pune, Goa, Mysuru, Hubli, Belgaum, Surat, Vadodara, Ahmedabad, Jodhpur, Udaipur, Bikaner, Ajmer, Agra, Gwalior, Jhansi, Puducherry, Tirunelveli(Kanyakumari), Guntakal, Tiruchirapali, Ratlam, Kota, Nagpur, Itarsi, Chitaurgarh, Abu Road, Gandhidham etc. Sangli station is convenient to reach from

== Swachh survekshan awards ==
Vita was ranked 9th in both the west zone and the state for Best City in 'Innovation & Best Practices' in 2020.

In the Swachh Survekshan Awards 2021, Vita ranked top in the cleanest city (in less than one lakh population category) of the India.
