= Khanapur (Vita) =

Khanapur (Vita) Khanapur
- village
- Location in Maharashtra, India
- Coordinates: 17°15′40″N 74°42′6″E
- Country: India
- State: Maharashtra
- District: Sangli district
- Talukas: Khanapur (Vita)

Government
  - Body: Nagar panchayat

Languages
  - Official: Marathi
- Time zone: UTC+5:30 (IST)
- ISO 3166 code: IN-MH
- Nearest city: Vita
- Lok Sabha constituency: Sangli
- Vidhan Sabha constituency: Khanapur-Atpadi
- Website: maharashtra.gov.in

Khanapur (Vita) is a village and taluka and a subdivision of Sangli district of Maharashtra in India.

== Demographics ==
Religions in Khanapur-Vita taluk (2011)
Religion	Percent
Hinduism	91.70%
Islam	6.06%
Buddhism	1.69%
Other or not stated	0.21%

Khanapur-Vita taluka had a population of 170,214. The sex ratio is 1011 females per 1000 males and the literacy rate is 82.23%. 17,943 were under 6 years of age. Scheduled Castes and Scheduled Tribes make up 13.41% and 0.54% of the population respectively. 28.37% of the population lives in urban areas.

Languages of Khanapur-Vita taluk (2011)
1. Marathi (92.1%)
2. Hindi (3.69%)
3. Urdu (1.76%)
4. Others (2.45%)

At the time of the 2011 census, 92.10% of the population spoke Marathi, 3.69% Hindi and 1.76% Urdu as their first language.
