= Khanapur, Maharashtra Assembly constituency =

Constituency of the Maharashtra legislative assembly in India

Coordinates: 17.26°N 74.72°E

Khanapur
- Constituency No. 286 for the Maharashtra Legislative Assembly

Constituency details
- Country: India
- Region: Western India
- State: Maharashtra
- District: Sangli
- Lok Sabha constituency: Sangli
- Total electors: 351,802
- Reservation: None

Member of Legislative Assembly
- 15th Maharashtra Legislative Assembly
- Incumbent Suhas Babar
- Party: SHS
- Alliance: NDA
- Elected year: 2024

Khanapur Assembly constituency is one of the 288 Vidhan Sabha (legislative assembly) constituencies of Maharashtra state in western India. It is a segment of Sangli Lok Sabha constituency. This seat was named 'Khanapur' until 1972. Then its name, and area under it, changed to 'Khanapur Atpadi', from 1978 to 2004. From 2008 onwards it was back to 'Khanapur' only, after the boundaries of constituencies were redrawn again.

There is a vidhan sabha seat by the same name (Khanapur) in Karnataka.

On 31 January 2024, the Khanapur, Maharashtra Assembly constituency seat became vacant upon the death of MLA Anil Babar.

== Overview ==
Khanapur constituency is one of the eight Vidhan Sabha constituencies located in the Sangli district. It comprises the entire Khanapur and Atpadi tehsil and part of the Tasgaon tehsil (Visapur Circal) of the district.

Khanapur is part of the Sangli Lok Sabha constituency along with five other Vidhan Sabha segments in this district, namely Miraj, Sangli, Palus-Kadegaon, Tasgao-Kavathemahakal and Jat.

This constituency comes under drought prone area where every year farmers are facing problems of water. The famous grape growing area comes under this zone.

== Members of the Legislative Assembly ==
Election	Member	Party
1952	Deshmukh Dattajirao Bhausaheb	Indian National Congress
1952	Bhingardeve Laxman Babaji	Indian National Congress
1962	Sampatrao Sitaram Mane	Indian National Congress
1967	Sampatrao Sitaram Mane	Indian National Congress
1972	Sampatrao Sitaram Mane	Indian National Congress
2009	Sadashivrao Hanmantrao Patil	Indian National Congress
2014	Anil Babar	Shiv Sena
2019	Anil Babar	Shiv Sena
2024	Suhas Babar	Shiv Sena

== Election results ==
=== Assembly Election 2024 ===
2024 Maharashtra Legislative Assembly election : Khanapur
Party	Candidate	Votes	%	±%
SS	Suhas Babar	153,892	61.33	▲6.65
NCP-SP	Vaibhavdada Sadashivrao Patil	75,711	30.17	New
Independent	Rajendra (Anna) Deshmukh	13,958	5.56	New
Independent	Dadaso Kondiram Chandanshive	2,198	0.88	New
NOTA	None of the above	769	0.31	▼1.06
Margin of victory		78,181	31.16	▲18.87
Turnout		251,685	71.54	▲4.43
Total valid votes		250,916		
Registered electors		351,802		▲8.86
SS hold		Swing	▲6.65	

=== Assembly Election 2019 ===
2019 Maharashtra Legislative Assembly election : Khanapur
Party	Candidate	Votes	%	±%
SS	Anil Babar	116,974	54.68	▲21.10
Independent	Sadashivrao Hanmantrao Patil	90,683	42.39	New
NOTA	None of the above	2,928	1.37	▲0.91
VBA	Shravan Shankar Wakshe	2,109	0.99	New
Margin of victory		26,291	12.29	▲3.16
Turnout		216,876	67.11	▼6.25
Total valid votes		213,943		
Registered electors		323,180		▲8.72
SS hold		Swing	▲21.10	

=== Assembly Election 2014 ===
2014 Maharashtra Legislative Assembly election : Khanapur
Party	Candidate	Votes	%	±%
SS	Anil Babar	72,849	33.58	▲32.09
INC	Patil Sadashivrao Hanmantrao	53,052	24.45	▼17.92
BJP	Gopichand Padalkar	44,419	20.47	New
NCP	Abasaheb Alias Amarsinh Narsingrao Deshmukh	39,725	18.31	New
Independent	Subhash (Appa) Patil	3,090	1.42	New
NOTA	None of the above	992	0.46	New
Margin of victory		19,797	9.13	▲7.51
Turnout		218,092	73.36	▲5.81
Total valid votes		216,945		
Registered electors		297,271		▲9.09
SS gain from INC		Swing	▼8.79	

=== Assembly Election 2009 ===
2009 Maharashtra Legislative Assembly election : Khanapur
Party	Candidate	Votes	%	±%
INC	Sadashivrao Hanmantrao Patil	77,965	42.37	▼17.08
Independent	Anil Babar	74,976	40.75	New
RSPS	Gopichand Padalkar	19,024	10.34	New
Independent	Nikam Rajendra Shahaji	4,161	2.26	New
SS	Nikam Ganesh Subarao	2,745	1.49	New
Independent	Shashikala Dilip Bhosle	2,086	1.13	New
Independent	Gorad Vilas Jagannath	1,145	0.62	New
BSP	Dattatraya Vithoba Hegade	1,135	0.62	New
Margin of victory		2,989	1.62	▼17.27
Turnout		184,063	67.55	▼2.28
Total valid votes		183,996		
Registered electors		272,496		▲187.24
INC hold		Swing	▼17.08	

=== Assembly Election 1972 ===
1972 Maharashtra Legislative Assembly election : Khanapur
Party	Candidate	Votes	%	±%
INC	Sampatrao Sitaram Mane	38,361	59.45	▲16.49
PWPI	Pawar Sampatrao Govindrao	26,170	40.55	▲23.35
Margin of victory		12,191	18.89	▲14.30
Turnout		66,243	69.83	▼8.83
Total valid votes		64,531		
Registered electors		94,867		▲17.68
INC hold		Swing	▲16.49	

=== Assembly Election 1967 ===
1967 Maharashtra Legislative Assembly election : Khanapur
Party	Candidate	Votes	%	±%
INC	Sampatrao Sitaram Mane	25,727	42.96	▼28.54
Independent	H. Y. Patil	22,981	38.37	New
PWPI	B. N. More	10,300	17.20	▼1.13
ABJS	D. B. Bhagat Patil	879	1.47	New
Margin of victory		2,746	4.59	▼48.58
Turnout		63,410	78.66	▲17.50
Total valid votes		59,887		
Registered electors		80,617		▲9.55
INC hold		Swing	▼28.54	

=== Assembly Election 1962 ===
1962 Maharashtra Legislative Assembly election : Khanapur
Party	Candidate	Votes	%	±%
INC	Sampatrao Sitaram Mane	30,767	71.50	▲12.25
PWPI	Bhagwan Nanasaheb More	7,887	18.33	New
PSP	Sopana Gopala Patil	1,848	4.29	New
ABJS	Balasaheb Babu Bagal	1,673	3.89	New
Independent	Sivaram Govind Jadhav	853	1.98	New
Margin of victory		22,880	53.17	▲41.00
Turnout		45,004	61.16	▲11.19
Total valid votes		43,028		
Registered electors		73,588		▼30.61
INC hold		Swing	▲39.17	

=== Assembly Election 1952 ===
1952 Bombay State Legislative Assembly election : Khanapur
Party	Candidate	Votes	%	±%
INC	Deshmukh Dattajirao Bhausaheb	34,268	32.33	New
INC	Bhingardeve Laxman Babaji	28,539	26.92	New
Independent	More Bhagwan Nana Saheb	21,367	20.16	New
SCF	Madhale Pirajirao Tayappa	19,479	18.38	New
Independent	Thorawade Baburao Changdeo	2,343	2.21	New
Margin of victory		12,901	12.17	
Turnout		105,996	49.97	
Total valid votes		105,996		
Registered electors		106,057		
INC win (new seat)				

== See also ==
- Khanapur (Vita)
- Vita
- Khanapur Atpadi Assembly constituency
- List of constituencies of Maharashtra Vidhan Sabha
