= Sangli Metropolitan Region =

Sangli Miraj Kupwad
- City
- Location in Maharashtra, India
- Coordinates: 16.860446°N 74.565518°E
- Country: India
- State: Maharashtra
- District: Sangli

Government
  - Type: Municipal Corporation
  - Rank: 91

Population (2022)
  - Total: 688,000

Languages
  - Official: Marathi
- Time zone: UTC+5:30 (IST)
- Website: www.smkc.gov.in

Sangli-Miraj & Kupwad is urban agglomeration and a municipal corporation in Sangli district in the Indian state of Sangli Miraj Kupwad is situated on the banks of the river Krishna and houses many sugar factories. A significant city in South-Western India, it lies 376 km from Mumbai, 230 km from Pune and 638 km from Bengaluru. The city is a significant healthcare hub, along with its twin city, Miraj. Sangli-Miraj-Kupwad combined has more than 1,000 hospitals and clinics, making it one of India's largest emerging medical hubs and an emerging international hub for treatment of patients, especially from west Asia (Gulf region). Sangli is also known for its grapes, raisins, jaggery and large number of sugar factories, with the district having more than 30 sugar factories. Sangli has the largest sugar factory in Asia and the most number of sugar factories in India. Sangli region boasts of the largest raisin market in Asia. Sangli-Miraj-Kupwad municipal corporation (SMKMC) along with its Urban Agglomeration consists of the satellite towns of Madhavnagar & Budhgaon, which is the 93rd biggest in India.

== Urban areas ==
The City includes, three nearby urban areas

1. Sangli is situated on the banks of river Krishna.
2. Miraj is a railway junction, a major healthcare centre and an export hub of classical Indian musical instruments. Famous hospitals like Wanless Hospital, Krupamayi Mental Hospital and Richardson Leprosy Hospitals are based in Miraj. Government Medical College, Miraj is also located in Miraj.
3. Kupwad, formerly a small town, now mainly houses the MIDC industrial area. Kupwad MIDC is an industrial area harbouring many foundries, spinning mills, chocolate factories, oil manufacturing, cold storage etc. Notable foundries are Tulsi foundry, J sons foundry. Notable spinning mills like Toto Toya spin ltd. Oil manufacturing factory (Chakan oil mills). Kupwad town has an Employees' State Insurance Hospital (ESIS Hospital) for the Insured persons and their family who are working in Kupwad MIDC area.
4. Madhavnagar
5. Budhgaon
6. Kavalapur
7. Kumthe
8. Kavathe Ekand
9. Tasgaon
10. Haripur
11. Ankali
12. Ashta
13. Padmale
14. Karnal
15. Vasagade
16. Nandre
17. Patgaon
18. Bhose
19. Arag
20. Sulgare
21. Malgaon
22. Bedag
23. Belanki
24. Samdoli
25. Inam Dhamani
26. Kavathe Piran
27. Tung
28. Mirajwadi
29. Tanang
30. Savali
31. Erandoli

== Governance ==
The Sangli Miraj Kupwad Municipal Corporation is the governing body of the metropolitan area of Sangli Miraj Kupwad. The municipal corporation consists of democratically elected members, is headed by a mayor and administers the city's infrastructure, public services and police. Members from the state's leading various political parties hold elected offices in the corporation. The Sangli Miraj Kupwad Municipal Corporation was created on 28 February 1998 by the merger of the previously separate municipal councils of Sangli, Miraj and Kupwad. Sangli had been the district administrative centre and Miraj and Kupwad were small towns located within 10-km distance from Sangli.

== Demographics ==
As of 2001 India census, Sangli-Miraj-Kupwad had a population of over a half million. Males constitute 51% of the population and females 49%. Sangli-Miraj-Kupwad has an average literacy rate of 77%, higher than the national average of 59.5%: male literacy is 81%, and female literacy is 69%. In Sangli-Miraj-Kupwad, 12% of the population is under 6 years of age. In Kupwad, as described by Gumperz and Wilson in 1971, Kannada speaking Jains and Lingayats formed the majority, while the rest consisted of Marathi speaking Dalits, Urdu speaking Muslims and a few Telugu speaking rope-makers. In Miraj Urdu speaking Muslims form a majority of 50% of total population of the city.
