= Shreekshetra Audumbar =

Shree Kshetra Audumbar
- Village/ Religious Place
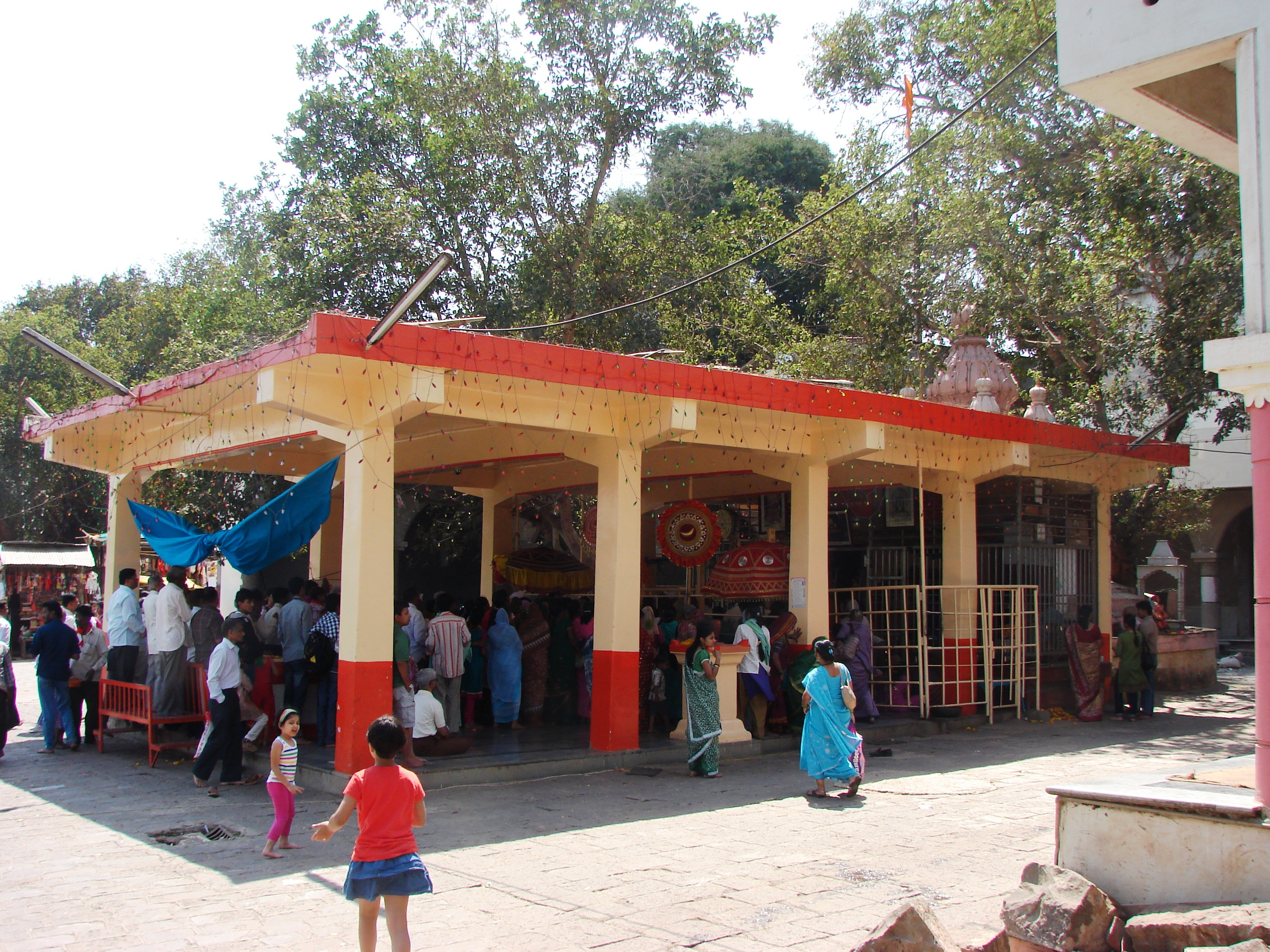
- Shreekshetra Audumbar
- Interactive map of Shree Kshetra Audumbar
- Coordinates: 17.010249°N 74.484036°E
- Country: India
- State: Maharashtra
- District: Sangli

Government
  - Body: Gram panchayat, Ankalkhop

Languages
  - Official: Marathi
- Time zone: UTC+5:30 (IST)
- PIN: 416320
- ISO 3166 code: IN-MH
- Nearest Railway Stations: Sangli railway station, Bhilawdi, Kirloskarvadi
- Nearest Cities: Palus, Sangli, Kolhapur, Karad
- Website: maharashtra.gov.in

Shree Kshetra Audumbar is in Palus Taluka, it is about only 12 km from Palus city, 15 km from Kirloskarvadi and 8 Kilometers east from Bhilawadi Railway station, audumbar is known for the shrine of Shree Dattatraya. It is said to have been built in honor of Shree Narasimha Saraswati who is supposed to be the second incarnation of Shree Dattatraya.

== Nearby Places to visit ==
- Palus
- Grapes farm in surrounding
- Goddess Bhuvaneshwari Temple
- Brahmanand Swami Math
- Sangameshwar Shiva Temple, Haripur
- Sangli
- Kolhapur
- Narsobawadi
- Kopeshwar Temple Khidrapur
- Krishna ghat, Bhilawadi
- Chitale Milk unit, Bhilawadi
- Sangli Ganpati temple
- Yashwantrao Chavan Sagareshwar Wildlife Sanctuary
- Jyotiba at Wadi Ratnagiri
- Shree Brahmanand Swami Math

== Railway Station ==
- Kirloskarvadi and Bhilawadi railway station are the nearest railway stations to Audumbar. There are also rickshaw and cars for rent from Palus taluka.
- Sangli railway station which is 26 km from Audumbar. Auto rickshaw and private cars are available from Sangli railway station to Audumbar.

== Bus Station ==
- Palus Bus station is only 12 km from audumbar.
- Sangli Bus Station which is 25 km from Audumbar city buses also available to audumbar.

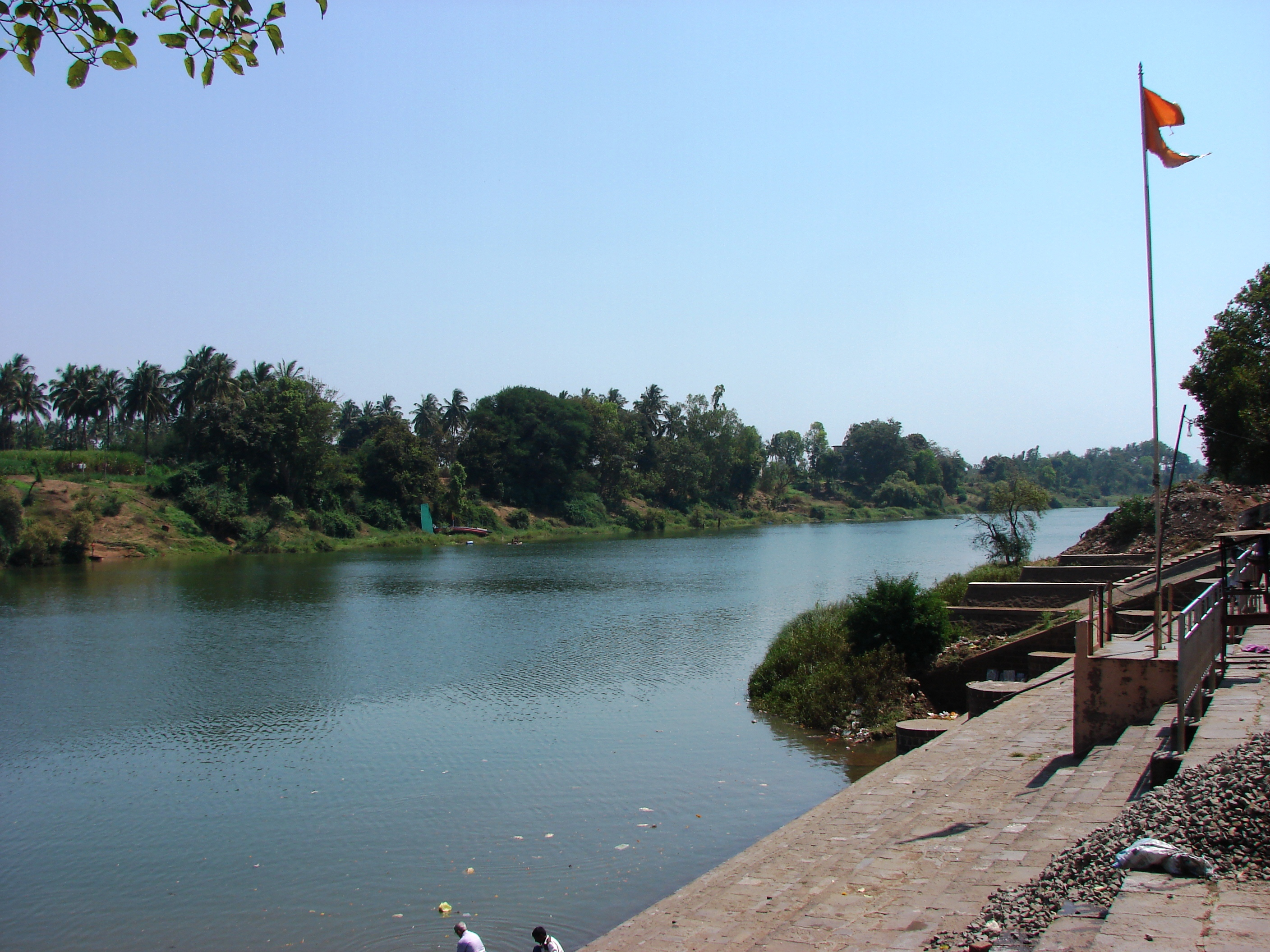
Shreekshetra Audumbar River Bank

== Accommodation ==
The village has a number of 3 star hotels, budget hotels, and lodges available in Sangli city And also in Palus There is a hospice near the temple.

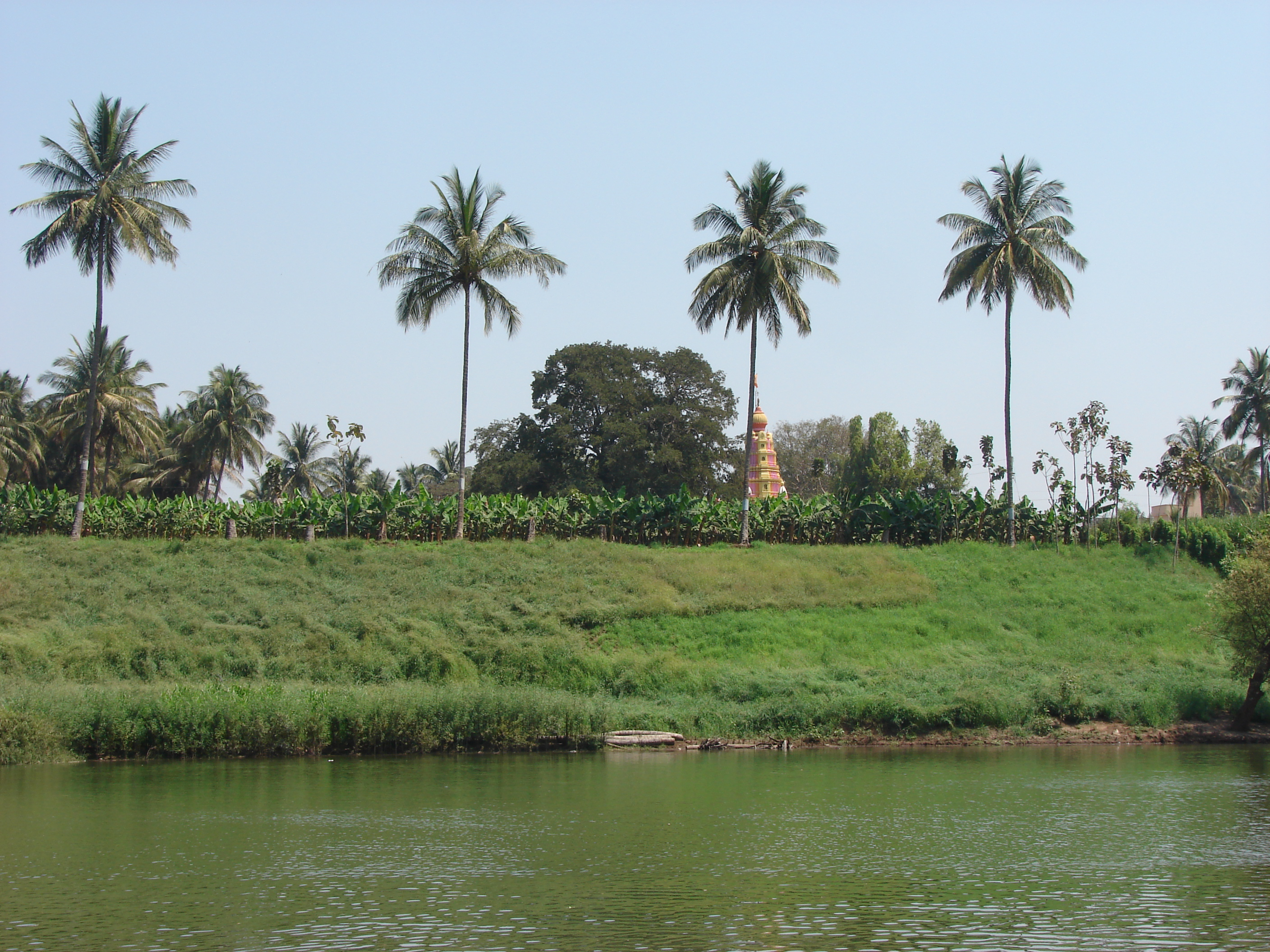
Shreekshetra Audumbar river bank
