= Yashwantrao Chavan Sagareshwar Wildlife Sanctuary =

Wildlife sanctuary in India

Coordinates: 17.153213°N 74.376730°E

Sagareshwar Wildlife Sanctuary
- IUCN category IV (habitat/species management area)
- Interactive map of Sagareshwar Wildlife Sanctuary
- Location: Sangli district, Maharashtra, India
- Area: 10.87 km^{2} (4.20 sq mi)
- Established: 1985

Yashwantrao Chavan Sagareshwar Wildlife Sanctuary is a protected area in the Indian state of Maharashtra. It is located at the meeting of three Tehsils of Sangli district: Kadegaon, Walva and Palus. The wildlife sanctuary is man-made; it is an artificially cultivated forest without a perennial supply of water, and most of the wildlife species were artificially introduced. It has an area of 10.87 km^{2}.

== Flora and fauna ==
The sanctuary is forested, but with grassy hill slopes. The forests are southern dry mixed deciduous and southern thorn forest. Protection from grazing and forest fire has resulted in good regeneration of dry deciduous species. The forest department introduced many plants in the area, including Tamarind, Neem, Nilgiri, Acacia, Agave, and Khair.

Large animals found in the sanctuary include several types of deer (Sambar Deer, Blackbucks, Muntjac, Chital) as well as wild boar and peacocks. Small carnivores like fox and porcupines are also found in the area. A large number of insects, birds and reptiles such as pythons and other snakes are also present.

== Tourism ==
The sanctuary is a popular tourist destination, with the peak tourism season being from August to February. The most popular tourist activity is hiking to the top of a hill in the sanctuary, from which one can see the Krishna River flowing through fields of sugarcane and grapevines. Also in the area are numerous shrines to Shiva which were built during the Chalukya dynasty, and the Krishna Valley Wine Park in Palus. Kundal, the region around Sangli, was the capital of the Chalukyas, a historical place.

== About Sagareshwar ==
The Sagareshwar sanctuary has much religious, cultural and archaeological significance. The sanctuary derives its name from an ancient famous Shiva temple that attracts a large number of devotees. It actually consists of one large temple and a complex of 51 small temples, all from the Satvahana period. You will find the Kamal Bhairao temple, partially hewn from hard basalt rock perched on the edge of a steep cliff. The entrance to the temple is through a narrow tunnel.

== How to reach Sagareshwar ==
- Sangli - 49 km
- Mumbai - 334 km
- Pune - 192 km
- Bangalore - 670 km

=== Nearest Railway Stations ===
- Sangli railway station - 49 km
- Miraj railway junction - 55 km
- Kirloskarvadi (palus) - 11 km
- Takari (walwa) - 5 km

All mail, express and superfast trains stop at Sangli and Miraj railway stations. MSRTC buses, private cars and auto rickshaws are available from Sangli, Palus and Miraj to Sagareshwar. Local passenger trains and few express trains stop at Kirloskarvadi and Takari stations. It is recommended to get down at Takari railway station and proceed to Sagareshwar. Many people reach Sagareshwar by walking from Takari station.

=== Nearest Bus Stations ===
- Karad - 28 km
- Miraj - 55 km
- Kundal -8 km
- Kirloskarvadi - 11 km
- Palus - 12 km
- Takari - 5 km
- Deorashtre 2 km

Take MSRTC buses from Sangli/Miraj and alight at Takari. Sagareshwar is 15 km from Palus bus station. You can walk down or take an auto rickshaw from Takari. It is recommended that you can take a private car from Sangli and reach Sagareshwar Hill Top Points.
