= Annasaheb Dange College of Engineering & Technology =

Engineering college in Maharashtra, India

Coordinates: 16°56′25″N 74°25′02″E

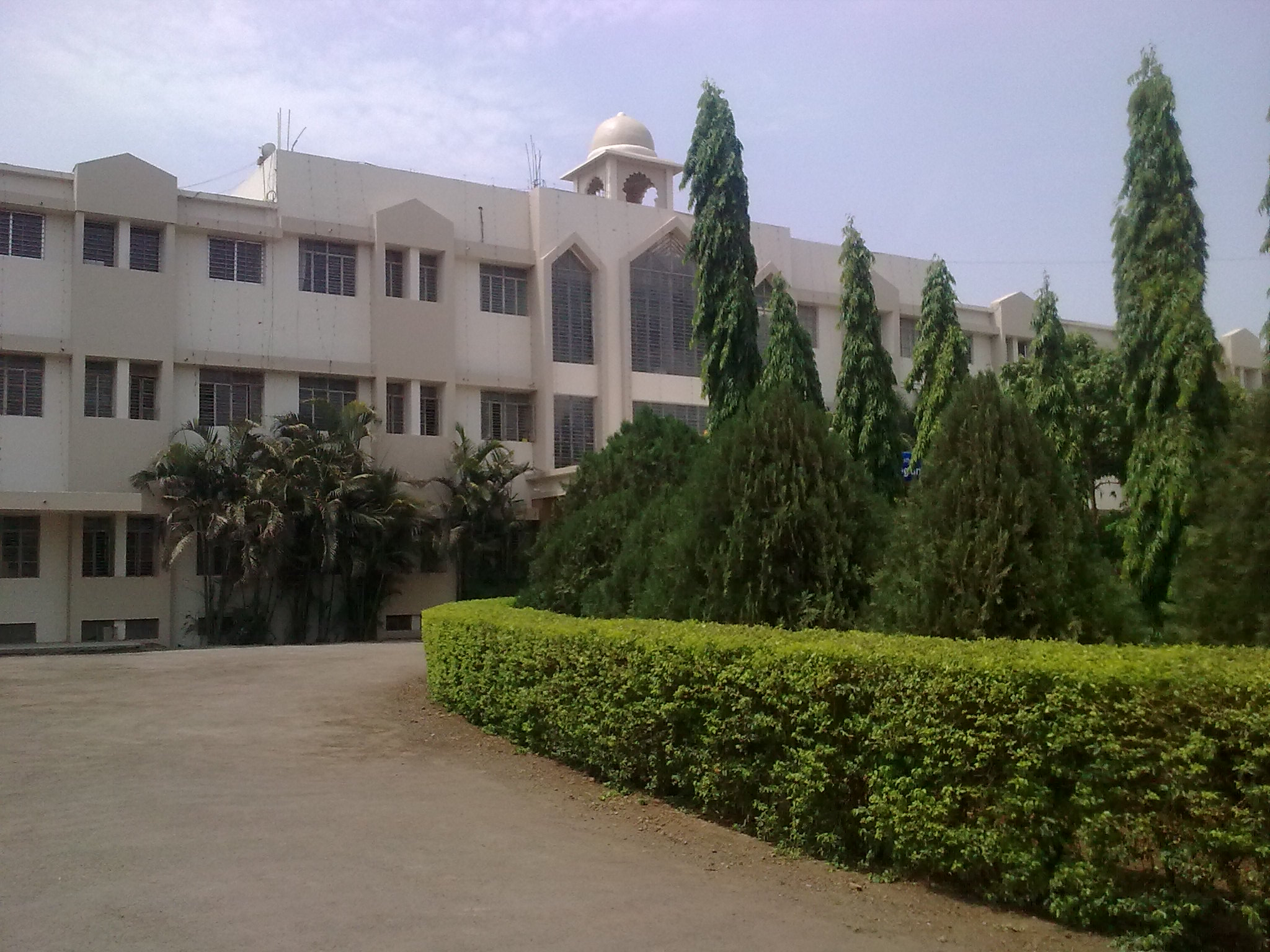
- Motto: ज्ञान ज्योती नमोस्तु ते
- Type: Autonomous
- Established: 1999
- Affiliations: AICTE; Shivaji University
- Principal: Dr. L. Y. Waghmode
- Director: Dr. L. Y. Waghmode
- Location: Ashta, Maharashtra, India
- Website: www.adcet.ac.in

Annasaheb Dange College of Engineering & Technology (ADCET) is an autonomous engineering college situated in Ashta, near Sangli, in Maharashtra, India. Established in 1999 by Annasaheb Dange and managed by Sant Dnyaneshwar Shikshan Sanstha, the institute offers undergraduate and postgraduate degrees in various engineering disciplines.

== History ==
Annasaheb Dange College of Engineering & Technology was established in 1999 by former Maharashtra cabinet minister Annasaheb Dange under the aegis of the Sant Dnyaneshwar Shikshan Sanstha (SDSS). The institution was set up to expand technical and higher education opportunities in the rural belt of Walwa taluka and adjacent parts of Sangli district.

Originally affiliated with Shivaji University, Kolhapur, the college initially offered undergraduate degrees in core engineering branches including Mechanical, Civil, and Computer Science. In the 2017–2018 academic year, the institute was granted autonomous status by the University Grants Commission (UGC), enabling it to design its own curriculum and academic assessment framework while retaining affiliation with Shivaji University. In August 2023, the National Assessment and Accreditation Council (NAAC) accredited the college with an 'A++' grade.

== Campus ==
The college campus spans 25 acres (10 ha) in Ashta, situated approximately 20 kilometres (12 mi) from Sangli and 15 kilometres (9.3 mi) from Ishwarpur.

=== Facilities ===
- Central Library: The library houses printed textbooks, reference volumes, and subscribed research journals, supported by digital terminals providing access to online engineering repositories and educational consortia.
- Hostels: Residential accommodation is provided through on-campus hostels for male and female students, equipped with dedicated dining mess halls and security infrastructure.
- Transport: The institution maintains a fleet of buses connecting the Ashta campus with surrounding urban areas including Sangli, Miraj, Jaysingpur, and Karad.
- Sports and Recreation: The campus features outdoor athletic grounds for cricket and football, indoor facilities for badminton and table tennis, and a gymnasium.

== Accreditation and recognition ==
The college is approved by the All India Council for Technical Education (AICTE) and affiliated with Shivaji University, Kolhapur. In 2017, the institute was granted autonomous status by the University Grants Commission (UGC), which was subsequently extended through the 2032–2033 academic term. In August 2023, the National Assessment and Accreditation Council (NAAC) accredited the institute with an 'A++' grade.

== Research and initiatives ==
In 2024, the institution initiated a student satellite training project in coordination with the Indian Space Research Organisation (ISRO) to design a nanosatellite. Engineering teams from the college have also been recognized in state-level agriculture and water filtration hackathons for developing sustainable multi-stage greywater recycling systems.

== Academics ==
The institution offers undergraduate Bachelor of Technology (B.Tech) and postgraduate Master of Technology (M.Tech) degrees accredited through Shivaji University and approved by the AICTE.

=== Undergraduate programmes ===
Four-year B.Tech degree courses are conducted across ten engineering specialisations:

- Aeronautical Engineering
- Artificial Intelligence and Data Science
- Civil Engineering
- Computer Science and Engineering
- Computer Science and Engineering (IoT and Cyber Security)
- Electrical Engineering
- Electronics and Telecommunication Engineering
- Food Technology
- Mechanical Engineering
- Robotics and Artificial Intelligence

=== Postgraduate programmes ===
Two-year postgraduate M.Tech programmes are offered in four core areas:

- Civil Engineering (Computer Aided Structural Engineering)
- Computer Science and Engineering
- Electrical Power Systems
- Mechanical Engineering Design
