= Manerajuri, Sangli =

Village in Maharashtra

Manerajuri is a village in Maharashtra, India. It is, with a population of 14,204 according to the 2011 Census, largely an agricultural village in Tasgaon taluka situated on the Sangli-Atapadi road, 11.26 km (seven miles) to the east of Tasgaon. Madhavnagar and Bhilavadi are the nearest railway stations, both of which are about 22.53 km (14.00 mi) distant from it.

== History ==
The following legend is told about the establishment of the village. Mani and Malli were two Daityas, both of whom were the devotees of Shiva. They had an enemy by name Khandoba who was also a worshipper of Shiva. None could overcome each other. Khandoba then went to the south of Dandoba hill and established a township which is the present Khanderajuri. Mani established his kingdom to the east of the same hill and it came to be called Manerajuri.

The villages of Manerajuri and Arag were granted to Anubai, the younger daughter of the first Peshva Balaji Vishwanath, who was married to Naravanrao Ghorpade (formerly Joshi), regarded as the son of Santaji Ghorpade. Prior to this, the rights of these villages were held by the Garud family, who opposed Anubai taking possession of the villages. This brought Balaji Vishvanath on the scene who succeeded in taking over the villages and handing them over to Anubai. Narayanrav died without leaving any heir, and hence Anubai adopted one. It was at this time that two vadas were built, one each at Manerajuri and Arag. At the very same time, a kunda for the Rambling spring which is nearby the Maha-dev temple of the village was built. It is 1.85 m^{2} (20 square feet) and can be approached by a flight of steps.

== Crops ==
Manerajuri has two hamlets, viz., those of Yogevadi and Lugadevadi. The chief crops grown are Grapes. turmeric, capsicum, groundnut, jowar and sugarcane. Plantains and mangoes are also produced and are generally sent to the Sangli market. Practically the entire crop of sugarcane is sold to the sugar factory near Madhavnagar. There is a small community of weavers weaving plain cloth and saris on hand looms. Tasgaon taluka, is one of the leading taluka in grape producer in India; and Manerajuri is leading village in Tasgaon taluka in grape producing, bottom line is Manerajuri is leading grape producing village in India.

== Education ==
The village among other things has a high school, a primary school. Mary Angels English medium school started by Mr. Jamdade in 2008. Soon after it was established, the school has gained tremendous popularity and respect in Tasgaon taluka. Students from taluka places and nearby villages are joining the school. Now students from the village won't have to face language barrier, when they go to bigger cities. Mr. and Mrs. Jamdade (Founder and Chairperson respectively) are doing a marvelous job at providing education and hence the much required backbone to the future generation. Mahavir Panduranga Salunkhe High school is an old Marathi medium school. They also have arts and science college. Kanya Vidyalaya provides good quality secondary education for girls.

== Famous people ==
Pandurang Salunkhe, born and brought up in Manerajuri, received a Mahavir Chakra from government of India, for his bravery in war against Pakistan. The high school has been named after him. Youth Foundation Krida Mandal founded in December 1979 and it has been arranging various activities for villagers on the occasion of death anniversary of Pandurang Salunkhe. Famous Marathi poet Vinayak Mahadev Kulkarni was born in Manerajuri. Mukund Ramkrishna Kulkarni, also born in Manerajuri in 1961, was a researcher and the HOD of Civil Engineering at the VIIT, Pune. Bidesh Kulkarni was the governor of Pondicherry.

== Places of worship ==
It has temples dedicated to Maruti, Vithoba, Mahadev and a dargah of Shaikh Fardin. A fair in honour of Yallamma Devi (Kannada: ಶರಣೆ ಶ್ರೀ ಎಲ್ಲಮ್ಮ ದೇವಿ) is held on Pausa Vadya 7 and is attended by over 10,000 persons. Every single person in the village worships Shaikh Fardin dargha. On Thursdays lot of people visit the dargha which is situated on top of the hill. This is one of the best examples of the togetherness of Hindus and Muslims in India. Humanity is the only religion in Manerajuri. Kaldoh-vasti is a large area in Manerajuri and has two prominent temples one is vithal mandir and the other is Datta mandir.

== Sangli Food Park ==
The park is being planned on a 305-acre (1.2 square kilometre) plot at Manerajuri. Cebeco (India) is the consultant for the project. The location is best suited for processing grapes, turmeric, mangoes, pomegranates, citrus fruits and custard apple. Common facilities planned are cold-storage, effluent treatment and social infrastructure.

== Distances from Major Cities ==
Major City	Distance (km)
Mumbai	390
Pune	220
Bengaluru	630
Goa	250
Hydrabad	480
Kolhapur	50
Solapur	211
Ichalkaranji	51
Panvel	342
Umadi	151
Belagavi (ಬೆಳಗಾವಿ)	148
Sangli	27
Vijayapura (ವಿಜಯಪುರ)	125
