= Shirala =

Shirala Battis Shirala
- town
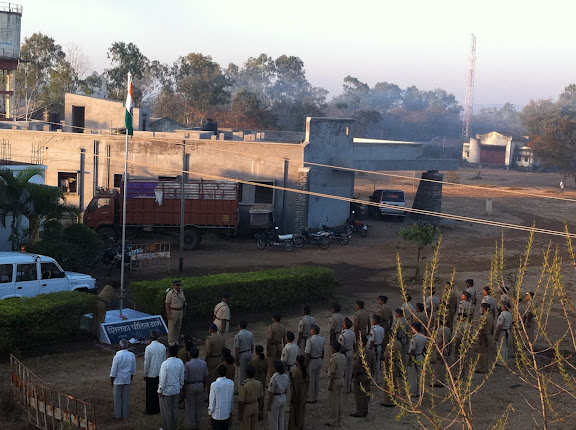
- Republic day parade at Shirala Police Station
- Nickname: Battis Shirala
- Location in Maharashtra, India
- Coordinates: 16.984011°N 74.124151°E
- Country: India
- State: Maharashtra
- District: Sangli
- Elevation: 594 m (1,949 ft)

Population
  - Total: 28,000

Languages
  - Official: Marathi
- Time zone: UTC+5:30 (IST)
- PIN: 415408
- Telephone code: 02345
- Vehicle registration: MH 10
- Nearest city: Kolhapur, Uran Islampur, Sangli
- Lok Sabha constituency: Hatkanangle
- Vidhan Sabha constituency: Shirala (Vidhan Sabha constituency)

Morana Dam near Shirala

Panoramic East Shirala on a Monsoon day

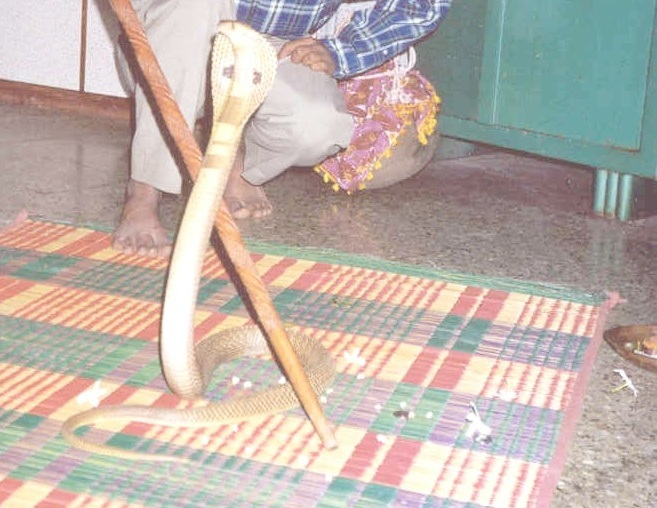
King Cobra being worshiped during Shirala Naag Panchami

Shirala also called Battis [32] Shirala is a town and tehsil in Sangli District, India, away 60 kilometres west of the district headquarters, Sangli and about 350 kilometres from Mumbai, capital of Maharashtra state. It is particularly known for its Hindu festival of the snake god.

== History ==
Shirala is a town located in western Maharashtra, India's most prosperous state. During the Rashtrakuta period the region was ruled by Shilaharas. (from 765 to 1020)

== The name ==
Shirala comes from word "Shilahara".The prefix ‘battis’ is the number thirty-two (32). It is said that thirty-two small villages surround this larger town. Historically, Battis Shirala has been major market.

== Local economy ==
The major source of income for people in this town is from agriculture. Since this place is capital of tehsil or taluka, large numbers of people are employed in various government offices, schools, colleges, banks, hospitals and other service industry. A couple of agriculture-based industries (sugar and starch) also contribute to the town’s economy. Water supply for drinking and agricultural purposes is available from Morna Dam, Shirala located 5 kilometres from town. The tehsil has large area under thick forests due to heavy monsoon rains. It provides patronage to variety of wild life in ‘Chandoli abhay-aranya', a national forest.

The town holds weekly farmers market on every Monday (aka "Monday Bajar"). Farmers and small vendors from the area put up temporary tents on small streets of town for the entire day. Fresh vegetables, meat, fish and other goods including clothing are sold in this market.

Recently, a dozen of small-scale agro-industries have been set in Maharashtra Industrial Development Corporation (MIDC) area near Shirala. With special economic concessions offered due to remoteness of the area, the MIDC has attracted number of investors in relatively short time.

== Transportation ==
Shirala is about 350 km. from Mumbai. State transport and private buses daily run between Mumbai and Shirala. Kolhapur is the nearest city, which is 60 km. away. Kolhapur is connected to Mumbai through daily trains.

Pune is connected to all major Indian cities through daily flights and trains. If you are visiting Shirala for Naag Panchami (Snake festival) only, a day trip from Pune is possible.

== Noted annual festival ==
Recently court has banned catching of snakes due to animal (snake) abuse cases as rough handling of snakes can result in their death. Battis Shirala is famous for its annual Nag Panchami Snake festival, which is attended by hundreds of thousands people.

In shirala, a day approximately two weeks before the festival, farmers clean their cows and bulls, decorate them and feed them with special food; villagers go snake-hunting, after getting kaul (permission) from Goddess Amba Bai by placing a flower on her head. If the flower falls, voluntarily on left side then that family is not allowed to catch snake that year. It is believed that only natives of Shirala are allowed to catch the snakes. Snakes (including the venomous Indian King Cobra) are tracked by their body marks in the soil. The ground is dug up carefully and the snakes are captured in such manner that they should not get hurt. A lot of care is taken so that snakes are not hurt as if they are hurt it is considered as a bad thing for that family. Hundreds of hours of searching produces seven or eight snakes per group if they are lucky. These snakes are then stored in a big circular earthen pot with a smaller circular earthen pot placed on the top opening. Finally a cloth is used to cover the top and is tied with a rope. These pots are usually hung outside house. Every morning till the actual festival, these snakes are taken out of their earthen pots and fed with a rat or frog. This feeding is called Dav Pajane or feeding dew to a snake.

On the day of festival, the snakes are displayed in a huge procession. The procession begins with the blessings of the village goddess Amba-bai. 70 to 80 groups and organisations take part in this procession. In the morning before the procession snakes are taken to few neighboring homes so that women in those homes can worship the snakes. The snakes that were caught before the festival, are released at the same place from which they were caught.

Myth is one of the families in Shirala use to worship snake murti. When one of the Navnatha (Gorakhnath) visited their place, he gave them permission and blessing to catch actual snake and worship it. Shirala has Gorkhnath Temple. Once in 12 years all the followers of Nath panti (Nath Sampradaya) visit Shirala and leave one of them behind to take care of this temple for the next 12 years.

Shirala is famous for one of the eleven Maruti temples built by Marathi saint Samarth Ramdas. This 17th-century temple is located about 200 feet away from main bus station of the town and is visited by many devotees on Saturdays. The town has a fort build by great Maratha warrior, Chhatrapati Shivaji. Currently, it is maintained by forest services office of town.
