= Guruwar Peth =

Guruwar Peth is a term, in the Marathi language, for a locality within an Indian city. Cities that include a Guruwar Peth include Pune, Solapur, Madhavnagar, Karad and Ahmednagar. The term Guruwar is derived from the day Thursday.

== Guruwar Peth, Solapur ==
Guruwar Peth, Solapur is an area located in western Solapur city, in Maharashtra State of the Republic of India. The famous Shankarling Temple is located there.
