= Kadegaon =

City of Sangli district of Maharashtra in India

Coordinates: 17°18′N 74°21′E

Kadegaon is a village and taluka of Sangli district of Maharashtra in India.

Kadegaon is a Taluka in Sangli District of Maharashtra, India. Kadegaon Taluka's Headquarters is Kadegaon village. It is in the Paschim Maharashtra region, Pune Division. It is located 63 km north of the district headquarters of Sangli and 290 km south of the state capital, Mumbai.

Kadegaon Taluka is bounded by Karad Taluka towards west, Palus Taluka towards South, Khanapur-Vita Taluka towards East, Khatav Taluka towards North.

== Demographics ==
As of the 2011 Census of India, Kadegon village had a population of 11,821 spread over 2,591 households.

Religions in Kadegaon taluk (2011)
Religion	Percent
Hinduism	92.96%
Islam	4.08%
Buddhism	2.56%
Other or not stated	0.40%

Kadegaon taluka had a population of 143,019, entirely in rural areas. The sex ratio is 993 females per 1000 males and the literacy rate is 80.98%. 15,104 were under 6 years of age. Scheduled Castes and Scheduled Tribes make up 10.84% and 0.61% of the population respectively.

Languages of Kadegaon taluk (2011)
1. Marathi (94.27%)
2. Hindi (2.79%)
3. Others (2.94%)

At the time of the 2011 census, 94.27% of the population spoke Marathi and 2.79% Hindi as their first language.

== Kadepur ==
- Wangi
