= Morna Dam =

Morna Dam may refer to following dams in the state of Maharashtra of India:

- Morna Dam, Shirala, on Morna river near Shirala in Sangli district
- Morna Gureghar Dam, on a local river near Patur in Satara district
