= Wangi, Sangli =

Village in Maharashtra

Coordinates: 18°11′N 75°09′E

Wangi
- Village
- Interactive map of Wangi
- Country: India
- State: Maharashtra
- District: Sangli
- Subdistrict: Kadegaon

Population (2011)
  - Total: 9,895
- Time zone: UTC+05:30 (IST)
- Pincode: 415305
- Telephone code: 02164

Wangi is a village in Kadegaon taluka, Sangli district, Maharashtra, India. The population was 9,895 at the 2011 Indian census.

== Education ==
The New English School Wangi, an upper primary and secondary school, is located in Wangi.
