= Manadur =

- Census town
- Location in Maharashtra, India
- Coordinates: 17.1622°N 73.8939°E
- Country: India
- State: Maharashtra
- District: Sangli

Population (2001)
  - Total: 3,920

Languages
  - Official: Marathi
- Time zone: UTC+5:30 (IST)

Manadur is a census town in Sangli district in the Indian state of Maharashtra.

== Demographics ==
As of 2001 India census, Manadur had a population of 3920. Males constitute 48% of the population and females 52%. Manadur has an average literacy rate of 61%, higher than the national average of 59.5%: male literacy is 74%, and female literacy is 49%. In Manadur, 13% of the population is under 6 years of age.
