= Karajagi, Sangji =

Karajagi Karajgi
- village
- Location in Maharashtra, India Karajagi (India)
- Coordinates: 17°07′28″N 75°34′30″E
- Country: India
- State: Maharashtra
- District: Sangli
- Taluka: Jat

Area
  - Total: 30.3325 km^{2} (11.7114 sq mi)

Population (2011)
  - Total: 4,346
  - Density: 143.3/km^{2} (371.1/sq mi)

Languages
  - Official: Marathi
- Time zone: UTC+5:30 (IST)

Karajagi is a gram panchayat village in southern Maharashtra State, India. Karajagi is located on the left bank of the Bor River. Administratively it is located in the Jat Taluka of Sangli District.

== Demographics ==
As of 2011 India population census, the Karajagi village had a population of 4,346, of which 2,287 were males while 2,059 were females. The overall literacy rate in Karajagi village was 61.62%, with male literacy at 65.41%, while female literacy rate was 57.41%.
