= Idris Naikwadi =

Indian politician

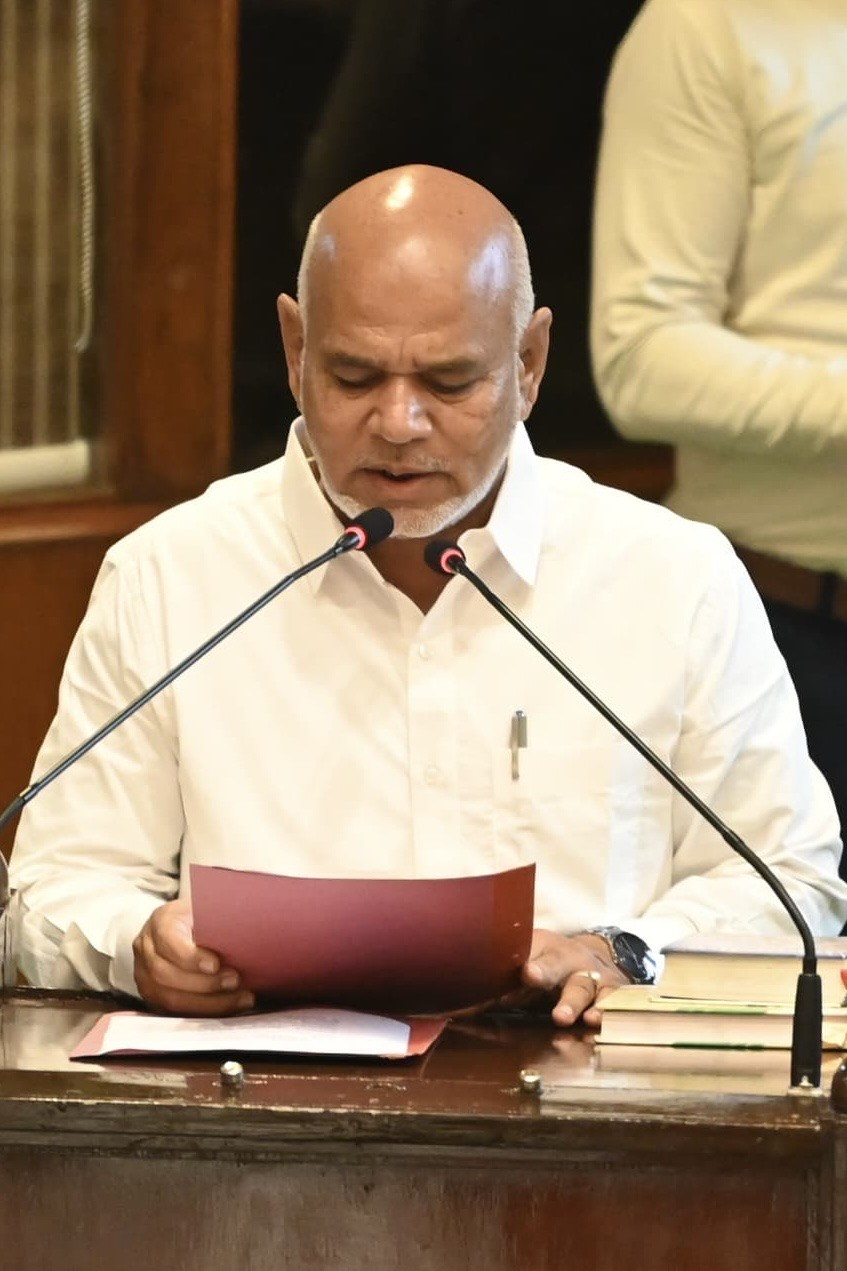

Member of Legislative Council Maharashtra
- Incumbent
- Assumed office 15 October 2024
- Governor: C. P. Radhakrishnan
- Constituency: Governor Nominated

Mayor of Sangli, Miraj and Kupwad City Municipal Corporation
- In office 11 February 2011 – 7 August 2013

Personal details
- Born: 4 August 1964
- Party: Nationalist Congress Party
- Spouse: Ayesha
- Children: [Atahar, Yusuf And Nazia]
- Occupation: Politician
- Profession: Educationist

Idris Naikwadi (born 1964) is an Indian politician from Maharashtra. He is a nominated member of the Maharashtra Legislative Council representing Nationalist Congress Party. He is the only Muslim in the Legislature. He is former mayor of Sangli, Miraj and Kupwad City Municipal Corporation in Maharashtra. He was one of the star campaigners of Nationalist Congress Party for 2024 Maharashtra Legislative Assembly election.
