= Sangli, Miraj and Kupwad City Municipal Corporation =

Local civic body in Sangli, Maharashtra, India

Sangli-Miraj-Kupwad Municipal Corporation Sangli Miraj & Kupwad Mahānagarpālikā

Type
- Type: Unicameral

History
- Founded: 9 February 1998

Leadership
- Municipal Commissioner: Satyam gandhi
- Mayor: Dheeraj Suryavanshi, BJP
- Deputy Mayor: Gajanan Magdum, NCP

Structure
- Seats: 78
- Political groups: Government (55): BJP (39); NCP (16); Official Opposition (23): INC (18); NCP-SP (3); SHS (2)
- Committees: Standing Committee; Ward Committees (4); Social Welfare Committee; Women and Child Welfare Committee

Elections
- Voting system: First-past-the-post voting
- First election: 1998
- Last election: 15 January 2026
- Next election: 2031

Meeting place
- SMKC Building, Rajwada Chowk Sangli

Website
- Official website

The Sangli-Miraj-Kupwad Municipal Corporation (SMKC) is the governing body of the Sangli Metropolitan Region in the Indian state of Maharashtra. It is located in Sangli. The municipal corporation consists of democratically-elected members, is headed by a mayor and administers the city's infrastructure and public services. It was founded on 9 February 1998. SMKC serves an area approximately 118.18 km^{2} and provides civil services and facilities for more than 6.5 lakh (650,000) people.

== Revenue sources ==
The following are the income sources for the corporation from the Central and State Government.

=== Tax revenue ===
Tax-related revenue for the corporation includes:

- Property tax
- Profession tax
- Entertainment tax
- Grants from the Central and State Government, including the Goods and Services Tax
- Advertisement tax

=== Non-tax revenue ===
The non-tax-related revenue for the corporation includes:

- Water usage charges
- Fees from documentation services
- Rent received from municipal property
- Funds from municipal bonds

== List of Mayors ==
#	Portrait	Name	Tenure			Election	Party
		Idris Naikwadi	8 February 2011	7 August 2013	2 years, 180 days	2008	Nationalist Congress Party
		Kanchan Kamble	14 August 2013	6 February 2016	2 years, 195 days	2013	Indian National Congress
		Harun Shikalgar	6 February 2016	14 August 2018	2 years, 189 days	2013	Indian National Congress
		Sangita Khot	20 August 2018	23 February 2021	2 years, 187 days	2018	Bharatiya Janata Party
		Digvijay Suryawanshi	23 February 2021	20 August 2023	2 years, 178 days	2018	Nationalist Congress Party
–		Vacant (Commissioner's rule)	20 August 2023	10 February 2026	2 years, 174 days	–	
		Dhiraj Suryavanshi	10 February 2026	incumbent	165 days	2026	Bharatiya Janata Party

== Municipal elections ==
=== 2026 ===
Party	Seats	+/-
Bharatiya Janata Party	39	▼2
Nationalist Congress Party	16	▲1
Indian National Congress	18	▼2
Nationalist Congress Party – SP	3	New entry
Shiv Sena	2	New entry
Total	78	

=== 2018 ===
Party	Seats	+/-
Bharatiya Janata Party	41	
Indian National Congress	20	
Nationalist Congress Party	15	
Others	2	
Total	78	

=== 2018 ===
Municipal elections were held on 3 August 2018 to elect a total of 78 councillors in 38 wards. The BJP won an absolute majority in the 2018 elections, marking the first time the city had a mayor from the party. Sangita Khot (BJP) was elected as the mayor and Dhiraj Suryawanshi (BJP) as the deputy mayor.

=== 2021 by-election ===
In the 2021 mayor and deputy mayor elections, the NCP, INC and Shiv Sena coalition defeated the BJP. This election, Digvijay Suryawanshi (NCP) was elected as the Mayor and Umesh Patil (INC) as the Deputy Mayor. In this election, some of the BJP councillors changed their party and they had to face this defeat.

=== 2026 ===
BJP won an absolute majority. Dheeraj Suryavanshi (BJP) was elected mayor.

== Taxes ==
The municipal corporation recently added a new tax as a substitute for the octroi, i.e. the Local Body Tax, from 25 September 2013 onward.
