= Bhose =

Village in Maharashtra

Coordinates: 16°57′N 74°43′E

- village
- Location in Maharashtra, India Bhose (India)
- Country: India
- State: Maharashtra
- District: sangli district

Languages
  - Official: Marathi
- Time zone: UTC+5:30 (IST)

Bhose is a village in the Miraj taluka of Sangli district in Maharashtra state, India.

== Demographics ==
Covering 425 hectares (1,050 acres) and comprising 197 households at the time of the 2011 census of India, Bhose had a population of 936. There were 485 males and 451 females, with 127 people being aged six or younger.
