= Erandoli =

Village in Maharashtra

Coordinates: 16.8499252°N 74.7596401°E

Erandoli is a village in Miraj Taluka in Sangli District of Maharashtra State, India. It belongs to Desh or Paschim Maharashtra region. It is in Pune Division. It is located 10 km (6.2 mi) east of the district headquarters Sangli and 361 km (224 mi) from the state capital at Mumbai.

- Time zone: IST (UTC+5:30)
- Elevation / altitude: 554 m (1,818 ft) above sea level
- Telephone Code / Std Code: 0233
- Pin Code: 416410

The village has a temple of goddess Janhavi Devi, and hosts a fair devoted to the goddess each year in February or March.
