= Kavathe Ekand =

Village in Tasgaon, Sangli district, India

Coordinates: 16°59′12″N 74°37′26″E

Kavathe Ekand is a village in the Tasgaon tehsil of Sangli district in Maharashtra, India.

The temple is known for the large-scale decorative fireworks and lighting display that occurs during the annual Vijayadashami festival, lasting all night until sunrise. Kavathe Ekand, along with the nearby village of Nagaon Kavathe, is known as the "Sivakasi of Maharashtra" due to its historical tradition of producing decorative fireworks.

== Demography ==
According to the 2011 population census, Kavathe-Ekand has a population of 988, of which 4811 are females and 5070 are from the male gender. The village has higher literacy rate compared to Maharashtra. Literacy rate of Kavathe Ekand village in 2011 was 85.44%, compared to Maharashtra which is 82.34%.

== Government ==
According to Constitution of India and Panchyati Raaj Act, Kavathe Ekand is governed by the Head of Village (Sarpanch) who is elected representative of village.
