= Budhgaon =

Sangli
- Census town
- Location in Maharashtra, India
- Coordinates: 16.9°N 74.6°E
- Country: India
- State: Maharashtra
- District: Sangli

Population (2001)
  - Total: 14,727

Languages
  - Official: Marathi
- Time zone: UTC+5:30 (IST)

Budhgaon is a census town in Sangli district in the state of Maharashtra, India.

== Demographics ==
As of 2001 India census, Budhgaon had a population of 14,727. Males constitute 53% of the population and females 47%. Budhgaon has an average literacy rate of 76%, higher than the national average of 59.5%; with male literacy of 82% and female literacy of 69%. 11% of the population is under 6 years of age.

Visitors place at Budhgaon include the Siddheshwar Mandir, Vitthal Mandir, Hanuman Mandir, Biroba Mandir, Ram Mandir and Gundubua Mandir. The Rajwada is also an old palace and has a huge gate. Other places like Jimkhana Talim old police station, the PVPIT (Padmavibhushan Vasantdada Patil Institute of Technology) campus and Shri Sant Dnyaneshwar Nagar. The town has two parts. One is Gaonbhag (pronounced as gavbhag) & Malbhag.

Gaonbhag includes the old village Budhgaon, There is a temple of lord siddheshwar and vitthal. Malbhag includes bus stand and rajwada. There is an engineering college named Dr. Padmabushan Vasantraodada Patil Institute of Technology, which is Started by Late Shri. VANSANTRAODADA PATIL, Maharashtra's former Chief Minister & it is the first Private Engineering College in Maharashtra 1982–83. It provides education in most of the major engineering branches. It is the village of Raja Patwardhan. The rajawada is one of the attractive places in budhgaon. Main door of rajwada is very big. The door of this rajwada is made up of a very thick wood. Some of the old goods are still present in the rajwada.

== Nearest Airport ==
- Kolhapur - 50 km
- Belgaum - 150 km
- Pune - 250 km
- Goa - 250 km

== Nearest Railway Station ==
- Sangli - 7 km
- Miraj - 10 km
