= Bilashi =

Village in Maharashtra

- village
- Nickname: Charan bilashi
- Location in Maharashtra, India Bilashi (India)
- Coordinates: 16.98333°N 74.03333°E
- Country: India
- State: Maharashtra
- District: Sangli

Languages
  - Official: Marathi
- Time zone: UTC+5:30 (IST)
- Vehicle registration: MH-10
- Nearest city: Karad

Bilashi is a historical village located in Sangli district, Maharashtra in India. This village is situated on the bank of River Warna.

The village is a well-known place for its structure of square shape. The Village has a canal to the north whereas a river River Warna in south. It is well connected with road to Taluka Shirala (17 km) in east side, to the west is Ratnagiri (approx. 92 km), Kolhapur (approx. 55 km), or Karad (via Shedgewadi).

The Chandoli National Park and Chandoli Dam are approx. 35 km from here.

Flag Hoisting at Bilashi, 1930 Satara, Maharashtra

"The Revolt of Bilashi" or the Zenda (Flag) Satyagraha took place in the Bilashi village of the Satara district of Maharashtra. In defiance of British rule, the people of Bilashi raised the tricolour national flag on July 18, 1930.

The villagers of Bilashi were uncooperative with British authorities, and boycotted the grazing fields because they were discontent with the auction sales of grass from reserved forest areas.To demonstrate their dissatisfaction, they hoisted a tricolour flag atop the village's Mahadeo Temple on July 18, 1930. When the police arrived at the flag-hoisting location, they were forced to leave because hundreds of men and women were protecting the national flag. Among the women defending the flag, Raju Kadam rose to prominence. The police returned to the Mahadeo Temple on September 6, 1930. However, this time it attacked the people protecting the flag with such ferocity that even the colonial officers were astonished. The police eventually were able to pull down the flagstaff and desecrate the flag. In the ensuing violence, two boys, Sitaram Chambhar and Dhondi Kumbhar, were also killed by gunfire.

The flag hoisting at Bilashi ended tragically, but its repercussions echoed even within the walls of the British parliament.
