= Bhilawadi =

- Town
- Location in India Bhilawadi (India)
- Coordinates: 16°59′14″N 74°28′4″E
- Country: India
- Province: Maharashtra
- District: Sangli
- Metro: Sangli
- Time zone: UTC+5:30 (IST)
- Pin Code: 416303
- Area code: +91-2346
- Lok Sabha constituency = Sangli: Vidhan Sabha constituency = Palus-Kadegaon
- Nearest city(s): Sangli, Palus, Tasgaon, Ashta, Islampur.
- Website: www.bhilawadi.com

Bhilawadi is a town which located in palus taluka. it is near about only 16 km from Palus city. Bhilawadi, located on the bank of Krishna River.
