= Arag =

Village in Maharashtra

- town
- Location in Maharashtra, India Arag (India)
- Coordinates: 16.78°N 74.80°E
- Country: India
- State: Maharashtra
- District: Sangli

Languages
  - Official: Marathi
- Time zone: UTC+5:30 (IST)
- PIN: 416401
- Telephone code: 0233
- Vehicle registration: MH-10

Arag is a small town in Sangli district in the Indian state of Maharashtra. It is approximately 30 km south east of the much larger urban conglomeration of Sangli-Miraj.

== Demographics ==
As of the 2011 census Arag has a population of approximately 15,000.

== Business and economy ==
In Arag over 75% of the population is employed in agriculture and within the region the town is famous for its progressive farming techniques. The primary crops grown are sugar cane, Baby corn paan mala, jwari, and, in common with the rest of the Sanli-region, Turmeric. Arag is Sangli's leading grape and sugar cane producing town. Arag is also famous for "Paan" and acres of Panmalas (Pan Growing Fields) can be seen in and around Arag, leading some visitors to describe the area as an open greenhouse. The pan is sent across India, with the majority going to Gujarat, Andhra Pradesh, and Mumbai.

Arag is considered to be the business center of the eastern part of Miraj, located just 6 km from Karnataka Border.

== Education ==
- Pride Institute's Guruprasad College
- Z.P. School Ashoknagar
- Z.P. Boys School
- Z.P. Girls School
- Z.P. Urdu School
- Kanyashala Arag
- English Medium School, Arag
- Arag Highschool Arag and Junior College of Arts, Commerce and Science
- Guruprasad Adhyapak Vidyalaya

== Places of worship ==
The town has temples built to Ganesh, Vitthal, Yallamma Devi, Mahadev (one modern and one ancient), Maruti, and a number of other deities. During the Yatra, an annual pilgrimage held on 26 January, many people visit the town of Arag to worship the goddess Yallamma Devi.

It is believed that there are two temples to Mahadev as the locals were unable to move the Shiv Ling to a new location (called Swayambhu Shiva). Therefore, a second temple was built in the newly desired location.

Arag has a substantial Jain community, both Digambar and Shwetambar. It has an ancient Digambar Jain mandir, believed to have been built more than 1000 years ago, with some locals reporting that it was built by Daitais in pre-historic times. In recent times, due to a lack of investment and poor management by the Indian Archaeological Department, the local community has started to maintain and restore it.

== Transportation ==
The road network within Sangli district is not highly developed although there are clear road links from the town to the more substantial Sangli-Anthani road that runs NW-SE just south from the town. Arag is located the following distances from other notable areas:

- Mumbai - 403 km
- Pune - 254 km
- Kolhapur - 58 km
- Satara - 129 km
- Solapur - 186 km
- Belgaum - 108 km
- Sangli - 24 km
- Miraj - 18 km
