= Kirloskarvadi railway station =

Railway Station in Maharashtra, India

General information
- Location: Kirloskarvadi, Palus, Maharashtra; India
- Coordinates: 17.0832°N 74.4171°E
- Elevation: 572 metres (1,877 ft)
- System: Indian Railways station
- Owner: Indian Railways
- Operator: Central Railway
- Line: Pune–Miraj–Londa line
- Platforms: 2
- Tracks: 4 (Single Diesel BG)
- Connections: Auto stand and Bus stand

Construction
- Structure type: Standard (on-ground station)
- Parking: Yes
- Cycle facilities: No

Other information
- Status: Functioning
- Station code: KOV
- Zone(s): Central Railway
- Division(s): Pune
Location
- Location within India Location within Maharashtra

Kirloskarvadi railway station is one of the important railway station in Palus, Sangli district, Maharashtra and on Central Railway line. Station code is KOV. It serves for Kirloskarvadi town and connectivity station for Palus–Tasgaon–Islmapur–Vita-Karad Talukas. The station consists of two platforms with completed electrification. The first electric train is expected to run on this line from Kolhapur to Mumbai by December 2021, trial run is completed on this line. The station is opposite the largest industrial township of Kirloskar Group. Famous Datta Maharaj Holy place Audhumbar is just 11 km away. Sagareshwar Wild Life Sanctuary is just 5 km from Kirloskarvadi station. There are trains to major cities like Pune, Mumbai, Delhi, Ahmedabad, Vadodara, Bhopal, Belgaum, Hubli, Jodhpur, Lonavala, Guntakal, Rajkot, Gandhidham, Goa and Bangalore.

== Trains ==
- Goa Express
- 16209 Mysore–Ajmer Express
- 16531 Ajmer–Bangalore City Garib Nawaz Express
- Gandhidham Express
- 16507/16508 Jodhpur–Bangalore City Express (via Hubballi)
- 16534/KSR Jodhpur–Bangalore City Express (via Guntakal))
- LTT-Dadar–Hubli Express
- Koyna Express
- Mahalaxmi Express
- Maharashtra Express
- Sahyadri Express
