= Morna Dam, Shirala =

Morna (Shirala) Dam
- Location within Maharashtra
- Official name: Morna Dam D03221; Shirala Dam D03221
- Location: Shirala
- Coordinates: 16.9897051°N 74.1029575°E
- Opening date: 1985
- Owners: Government of Maharashtra, India

Dam and spillways
- Type of dam: Earthfill
- Impounds: Morna river
- Height: 31.2 m (102 ft)
- Length: 1,115 m (3,658 ft)
- Dam volume: 793 km^{3} (190 cu mi)

Reservoir
- Total capacity: 15,150 km^{3} (3,630 cu mi)
- Surface area: 3,203 km^{2} (1,237 sq mi)

Morna Dam is an earthfill dam on the Morna river near Gureghar village in Patan tehsil, Satara district in the state of Maharashtra in India.

== Specifications ==
The height of the dam above lowest foundation is 31.2 m (102 ft) while the length is 1,115 m (3,658 ft). The volume content is 793 km^{3} (190 cu mi) and gross storage capacity is 21,160.00 km^{3} (5,076.55 cu mi).

== Purpose ==
- Irrigation

== See also ==
- Dams in Maharashtra
- List of reservoirs and dams in India
