= Jaysingpur =

- Town
- Location in Maharashtra, India
- Coordinates: 16.7835056°N 74.5664406°E
- Country: India
- State: Maharashtra
- District: Kolhapur
- Founded: 1916
- Founder: Shahu of Kolhapur

Government
  - Type: Municipality
  - Rank: .

Population
  - Total: near about 70,000

Languages
  - Official: Marathi
- Time zone: UTC+5:30 (IST)
- PIN: 416101
- Telephone code: +91-2322
- Vehicle registration: MH-09

Jaysingpur is a city and municipal council in the Kolhapur district of the Indian state of Maharashtra. The city derives its name from Raja Jaysing, the father of Shrimant Chhatrapati Shahu Maharaj of Kolhapur, who planned and developed the architecture of the city. Shahu Maharaj laid out Jaysingpur as one of the few "chess board cities" in Maharashtra where roads meet at 90-degree angles. Jaysingpur is rapidly developing as a major satellite suburb of Sangli city. The city holds a strategic location between Sangli, Kolhapur, Miraj and Ichalkaranji.

The city was founded in 1916 and celebrated its centenary(Shatabdi Varsha) in September 2016. The city has one of the largest tobacco markets in the country, and processes tobacco and gutkha for the surrounding region.

Siddheshwar is the grama daivat (town deity) of Jaysingpur, also known as the deity of Siddheshwar Mandir.

== Education ==
Jaysingpur has many educational institutions. Schools in Jaysingpur are either "municipal schools" or private schools run by trusts or individuals, which may receive government financial aid. The schools are affiliated either with the Maharashtra State Board, the All-India Council for the Indian School Certificate Examinations, the National Institute of Open Schooling, or the Central Board of Secondary Education. Marathi, Semi-English and English are the usual languages of instruction. There are many schools which provide better education facilities at affordable fees. Laxminarayan Malu High School (Old Jaysingpur High School), Balawantrao Zele High School, Jantara Kalpvruksha Vidyamandir (Old Bharat High School), the oldest schools hold more than 7000 students studying from first to twelfth grade. The town includes 3 schools and two medical college, one diploma-polytechnic college and one engineering college. Postgraduate education in the fields of engineering and medicine is available.

== Economy ==
Jaysingpur is an important marketplace for the trading of tobacco and crops like rice, baby corn and cereals. It is also an automotive industries supply chain and manufacturing hub as many suppliers transport their finished components through Jaysingpur. Baby corn suppliers from Danoli (Hirashankar Agro (Amit Dalavi). In addition, many high-tech engineering entrepreneurs have businesses in Jaysingpur.

== Transport ==
=== Roads ===
Jaysingpur has good connectivity with a number of major cities. However, much of the road network remains unpaved. It is well connected with Kolhapur and Sangli through Kolhapur - Sangli State Highway.

=== Bus ===
Public transport by bus is provided by MSRTC (Maharashtra State Road Transport Corporation). There are also many private buses that provide services to all major destinations in Maharashtra, Karnataka and Andhra Pradesh. MSRTC provides bus services from Jaysingpur to Sangli city, Miraj city and the Kolhapur city every 15 minutes.

=== Railways ===
Jaysingpur has a railway station (station code - JSP) which is on the Kolhapur–Miraj line of the Central Railway.Sangli station is the nearest major railway station, about 12 km (7.5 mi) away on the Mumbai–Bangalore main line. Sangli railway station is also connected to the city via bus services. From Sangli railway station, there are seversl trains to Delhi, Mumbai, Bengaluru, Pune, Goa, Mysuru, Hubli, Belgaum, Surat, Vadodara, Ahmedabad, Jodhpur, Udaipur, Bikaner, Ajmer, Agra, Gwalior, Jhansi, Puducherry, Tirunelveli(Kanyakumari), Guntakal, Tiruchirapali, Ratlam, Kota, Nagpur, Itarsi, Solapur, Latur, Barshi, Chitaurgarh, Abu Road, Gandhidham etc. Sangli station is convenient to reach from Jaysingpur.
