= Palus, Maharashtra =

Palus
- city
- Nickname: Palus
- Location in Maharashtra, India
- Coordinates: 17°05′N 74°28′E
- Country: India
- State: Maharashtra
- District: Sangli
- Established: 1999

Government
  - Type: Municipal council
  - Body: Palus Municipal Council

Area
  - Total: 297 km^{2} (115 sq mi)

Population (2011)
  - Total: 164,909
  - Density: 555/km^{2} (1,440/sq mi)
- Demonym: Paluskar

Languages
  - Official: Marathi
- Time zone: UTC+5:30 (IST)
- ISO 3166 code: IN-MH
- Vehicle registration: MH-10
- Nearest Cities: Sangli, Tasgaon, Kolhapur, Karad, uran islampur
- Lok Sabha constituency: Sangli
- Vidhan Sabha constituency: Palus Kadegaon
- Website: http://www.click2palus.com

Palus is a city and municipal council in sangli district.

In Palus, Grapes production is also done on a very large scale and grapes of Palus are widely known. The grapes here are also sold abroad.

Grapes are grown here using new technologies and different methods.

== Demographics ==
Religions in Palus taluk (2011)
Religion	Percent
Hinduism	87.75%
Islam	6.12%
Jainism	4.11%
Buddhism	1.81%
Other or not stated	0.21%

Palus taluka had a population of 164,909, entirely in rural areas. The sex ratio is 933 females per 1000 males and the literacy rate is 86.11%. 16,700 were under 6 years of age. Scheduled Castes and Scheduled Tribes make up 11.15% and 0.71% of the population respectively.

Languages of Palus taluk (2011)
1. Marathi (94.3%)
2. Hindi (2.93%)
3. Others (2.80%)

At the time of the 2011 census, 94.27% of the population spoke Marathi and 2.93% Hindi as their first language.

== Industrial zone, MIDC & other ==
The industrial zone of Palus produces various parts in foundry, full finished machining on it as per requirement . It is home to the Krishna Valley Wine Park, Krishna-verala spinningmills and a marketplace with hardware and construction shops.

India's second oldest industrial township kirloskarvadi is located in palus taluka.

Kirloskar Brothers is located about 4 kilometers from Palus. Corporations are located in Kirloskarvadi include Kirloskar Ebara Pumps limited (KEPL), Kirloskar Brothers Limited (KBL) and other steelwork firms.

- Palus mini MIDC, palus
- Sandgewadi (Palus) MIDC, palus
- Sawantpur Vasahat
- Famous Milk dairies in large scales
- Valves and water pumps manufacturers, machine shops, foundries, cnc machine shops.
- Grapes farming in large scale
- Tiles and hardware markets are also in large scale
- Hindustan petroleum corporation limited (HPCL) Gas bottling plant and gas and petrol supply unit, Hajarwadi (Bhilawadi railway station)

== Education ==
- Laxmanrao Kirloskar School & Junior College.
- Bharti Vidyapeeth College of Pharmacy.
- Bachpan play school
- Pandit Vishnu digambar school and college
- Arts, Commerce and Science College Palus
- Industrial training institute palus
- Shri Samarth English medium school
- Jawaharlal navodaya vidyalaya palus (JNV) PALUS.
- Takshila School

And Many more schools, colleges, academies are situated in palus & surrounding area.

== Attractive places to visit ==
Attractions in the Palus area include the

- Samarth dhondiraj maharaj temple
- Sagareshwar Wildlife Sanctuary
- Grapes farm
- Famous Milk dairies in large scale situated here you can be visit.
- Shreekshetra audumbar
- Krishna ghat, Bhilawadi
- Kundal forest academy by GOV OF MAHARASHTRA
- Hanuman temple, pundi
- Palus market
- the fair of palus is also very famous .

Hindustani classical vocalist Vishnu Digambar Paluskar (1872-1931) was born there.

=== Temples ===
- Dhondiraj Maharaj Math/Mandir
- H. Daval Malik (Baba) Dargah
- Old Vitthal Temple
- New Vitthal Temple
- Shivling Temple
- Nag Temple
- Birudeo Temple
- Hanuman Temple
- Gram Daivat Padmavati Mandir
- Ganpati temple palus colony, palus
- Balumama Temple

== Villages ==
The villages in the Tehsil include:

- Amanapur
- Andhali
- Ankalkhop
- Anugdewadi
- Audumbar
- Bambavade
- Bhilawadi
- Bramhanal
- Burli
- Burungwadi
- Chopdewadi
- Dahyari
- Dudhondi
- Ghogaon
- Hajarwadi
- Khandobachiwadi
- Khatav
- Kirloskarvadi
- Kundal
- Malwadi
- Morale
- Nagrale
- Nagthane
- Palus
- Pundi Tarf Walava
- Pundiwadi
- Ramanandnagar
- Sandgewadi
- Sandgewadi MIDC area
- Santgaon
- Sawantpur
- Shere Dudhondi
- Sukhwadi
- Surygaon
- Tavdarwadi
- Tupari
- Vitthalwadi
- Vasgade

== Transport ==
Palus is served by the following transport infrastructure: By Air:-

- Kolhapur Airport is situated around 60 kilometers from Palus
- Kirloskarvadi airstrip which is eligible for helicopters, small planes and jets.

By Rail :-

- Kirloskarvadi Station (Palus) is the nearest railway station to Palus. This is located in The Central Railway Zone of Indian Railways.
- Bhilawadi (Palus) railway station.
- Amnapur (Palus) railway station
- Nearest railway junction miraj 44 km
