= Kundal =

Kundal Kaundanyapur
- Town
- Location in Maharashtra, India
- Coordinates: 17.117°N 74.414°E
- Country: India
- State: Maharashtra
- District: Sangli

Government
  - Type: Grampanchayat

Population (2011)
  - Total: 18,287

Languages
  - Official: Marathi
- Time zone: UTC+5:30 (IST)
- PIN: 416309
- Telephone code: 91 2346
- ISO 3166 code: IN-MH
- Vehicle registration: MH10
- Lok Sabha constituency: Sangli
- Vidhan Sabha constituency: Palus Kadegaon
- Website: maharashtra.gov.in

Kundal is a town in Palus Taluka within the Sangli District of southwestern Maharashtra, India. It has a population of 18,287 people - 9,432 males and 8,855 females according to the 2011 census. Kundal is located 40 kilometres (25 miles) north of the district capital, Sangli and 5 km from Palus.

== History ==
Kundal was originally the region around Sangli, and was the capital of the Chalukyas. Kundal is a historical place; its ancient name was Koundinyapuro. The traditions of Kundal are more than 1,600 years old. It is believed that Samavsharan of Bhagwan Parsvanath, Mahaveer, and Shrutkevali Poojya Shridhara Muni came to the region and achieved salvation. In Kundal, Lord Parsvanath’s idol story is well-known.

It is said that after a son of a king died from disease, his newly married wife prepared an idol of Parsvanath made of sand. The Goddess Padmavati started praying and worshiping it with all her heart. Owing to the power of such sincere worship, her husband was resurrected. The story of King Satyeshwar and Queen Padmashri of Koundinyapur is based on similar concepts and ideas.

Kundal was home to freedom fighters such as Krantisigha Nana Patil, Krantiagrani G. D. (Bapu) Lad, Krantiveer Captain Akaram (Dada) Pawar, Krantiveer R. S. (Mama) Pawar, Captain Rambhau Lad, Shri. Shankar (Anna) Ganu Mali, Khasherao (Aabaa) Pawar, Yashwant (Baba) Pawar, Shankar Jangam and many others. Kundal village is also associated with famous and popular Marathi poet and lyricist Gajanan Digambar Madgulkar, popularly known as GaDiMa. He resided here during his early days. Marathi is the official language in Kundal. Kundal is famously known for 100 year-old Maharstra Kusti Maidan start 1922 and an annual Kusti competition.

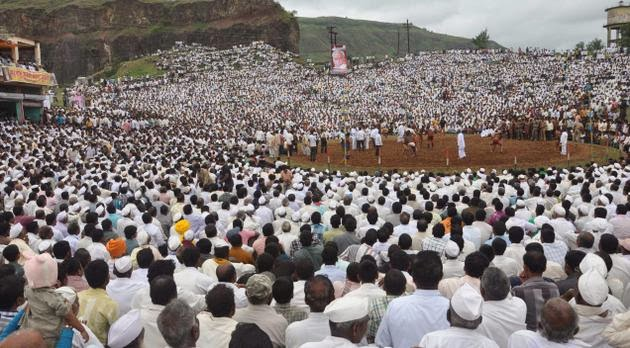
Maharashtra Kusti Maidan

== Industry ==
The Kundal industrial area is the largest in the Sangli district. It includes companies like the Kranti Sugar Factory. Kundal is also known for production of grapes, such as the "Sonakka, Sharad, Super Sonakka, Thomsan and Export Quality (Europe)" grape and largest production of sugarcane.

== Education ==
Kundal Academy of Development, Administration and Management is Maharashtra's first forest training academy serving NGOs in the field of environmental protection. This is the fifth Forest Academy of India, catering to the training needs of State Services Forest Officers of Western India. Kundal is mainly two Educations Societies first one is Gandhi Education Society's which includes Pratinidhi High School Kundal was established in 1949. Pratinidhi High School and Jr. College was established by the great eminent personalities like late Dr.G.D. Bapu Lad for the uplifment of common learner of common man.

Pratinidhi Highschool and Jr. College, Kundal is located at Kundal, Palus in Sangli district of Maharashtra, India. It is affiliated with Maharashtra State Board of Secondary and Higher Secondary Education (MSBSHSE). Pratinidhi High School Kundal is a higher secondary. It is a private aided government school.

The only purpose behind establishment of this school is to provide better education to the people in rural areas. "Education should be able to provide us livelihood after learning. Also we must enrich quality of Education so it may result in benefit of masses", this is the purpose of our school.

Second Society is Dr. Patangrao Kadam Vidyalaya and Junior College, Kundal main reason is both societies are charge very cheap amount for education.

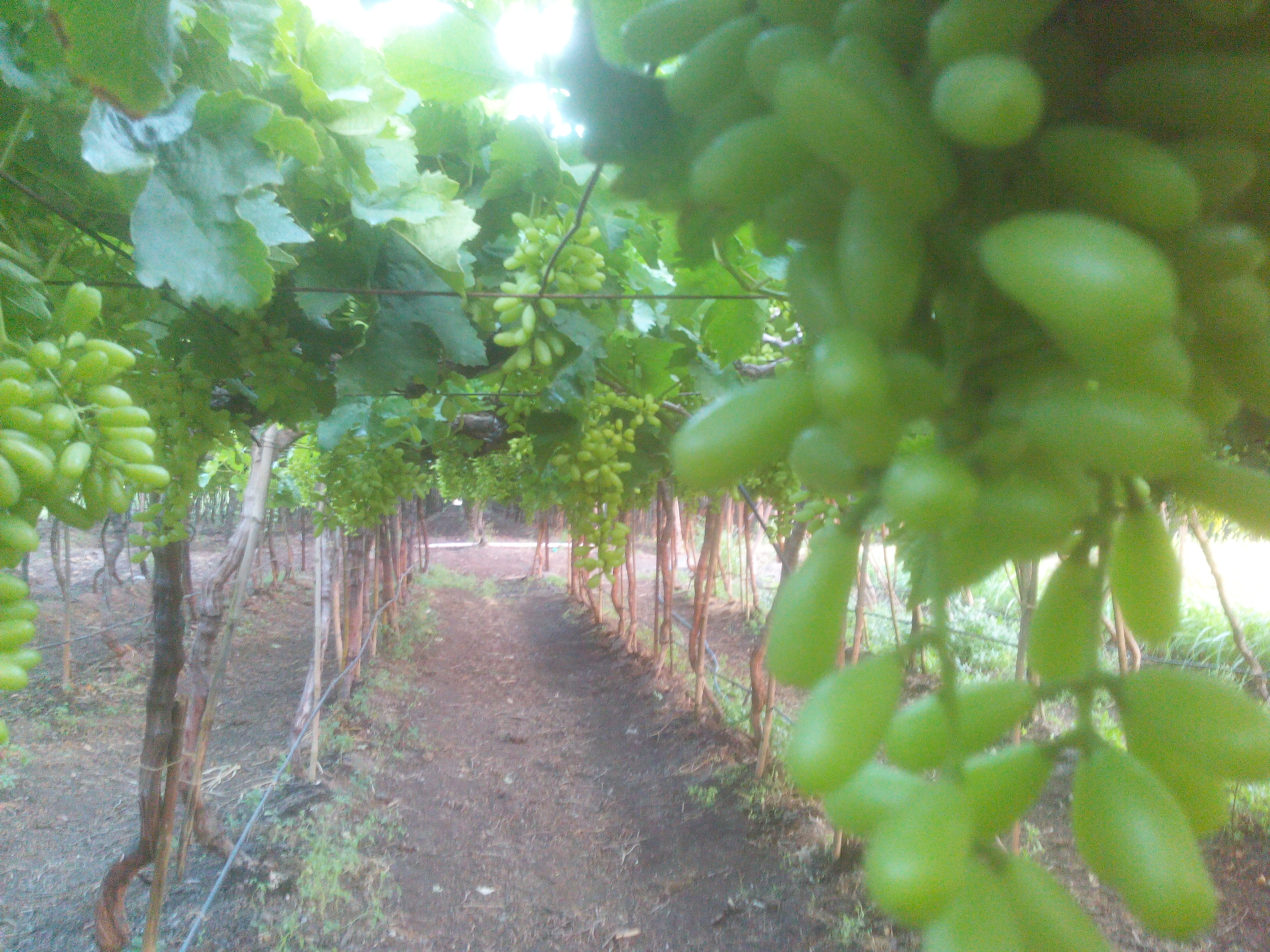
Grapes in pre-coloring stage in Mali grapes garden in Kundal. Image from Mali's Grapes garden

== Economy ==
The most of peoples of this village depends on Agro based production. It is famous for good quality of grapes production.

== Agriculture ==
Kundal is famous for growing export quality grapes. Sugarcane is most growing crop and many farmers are famous to grow high quality sugarcane.

== Transport ==
You can reach Kundal by the following ways:

- By Air: Pune Airport is 200 kilometres (120 miles), Sangli Airport is 45 kilometres (28 miles) and Karad Airport is 35 kilometres (22 miles) from Kundal.
- By Railway: The nearest railway station is Kirloskarwadi, which lies on the central railway line. The main line, just 3 kilometres (1.9 miles) from Kundal, is connected to Mumbai, Tirupati, Chennai, Bangalore, Pune, Goa, etc.
- By Road: Kundal is 200 kilometres (120 miles) or four hours by road from Pune, and 40 kilometres (25 miles) from Karad. Karad is about 160 kilometres (99 miles) from Pune and is located on Pune-Bangalore Express highway.
