= Ashta, Maharashtra =

Ashta
- city
- Nickname: सव्वालाखी आष्टा
- Location in Maharashtra, India
- Coordinates: 16.95°N 74.4°E
- Country: India
- State: Maharashtra
- District: Sangli
- Elevation: 567 m (1,860 ft)

Population (2011)
  - Total: 38,500

Languages
  - Official: Marathi
- Time zone: UTC+5:30 (IST)
- Postal code: 416301
- ISO 3166 code: IN-MH
- Vehicle registration: MH-10
- Website: maharashtra.gov.in

Ashta is a city and a municipal council in Sangli district in the state of Maharashtra, India. It is located at 16.95°N 74.4°E. It has an average elevation of 567 metres (1860 ft). The name "Ashta" comes from the legend that Lord Shri Ram established eight (Asht) Lord Mahadev temples in this area. The city is divided into 19 wards for which elections are held every 5 years. The Ashta Municipal Council has the population of 37,105 of which 19,171 are males while 17,934 are females as per the report released by Census India 2011.

Ashta is rapidly merging with Sangli city as a satellite suburb and will soon become part of Sangali Urban Agglomeration.

The population of children aged 0-6 is 3739 which is 10.08% of the total population of Ashta (M Cl). In Ashta Municipal Council, the female sex ratio is 935 against state average of 929. Moreover, the child sex ratio in Ashta is around 869 compared to Maharashtra state average of 894. The literacy rate of Ashta city is 83.60% higher than the state average of 82.34%. In Ashta, male literacy is around 89.52% while the female literacy rate is 77.32%.

Ashta Municipal Council has total administration over 7,709 houses to which it supplies basic amenities like water and sewerage. It is also authorized to build roads within Ashta Municipal Council limits and impose taxes on properties coming under its jurisdiction.

== Education ==
Annasaheb Dange College of Engineering & Technology is an autonomous engineering college, located in the city. It is located about 20 km from Sangli. The institute is NAAC-accredited and NBA-accredited.

Annasaheb Dange Ayurved Medical college

Annasaheb Dange college of B.Pharmacy

Arts & commerce college

M.G.V & junior college

K.B.P English Medium School

New English School For Girls

Vilasrao Shinde Saheb Highschool Ashta

B.K.Chougule madhyamik vidyalaya Ashta

Navodit prathmik v madhyamik vidyalaya Ashta

== Agriculture ==
Sugar cane is the predominant crop grown by the farmers in Ashta. Ashta is among several towns in Sangli district which are considered part of larger sugar cane belt. It was hit by floods in 2019 affecting sugarcane production.

== Industry ==
Zanver Group of industries 1) Ashta Liners Pvt Ltd 2) Kasturi Foundry Pvt Ltd

== Transport ==
=== Railway ===
Sangli & Kirloskarvadi is the nearest big railway stations sangli : 18 km, Kirloskarvadi : 23km from Ashta.Sangli station is the nearest major railway station, about 12 km (7.5 mi) away on the Mumbai–Bangalore main line. Sangli railway station is also connected to the city via bus services. From Sangli railway station, there are several trains to Delhi, Mumbai, Bengaluru, Pune, Goa, Mysuru, Hubli, Belgaum, Surat, Vadodara, Ahmedabad, Jodhpur, Udaipur, Bikaner, Ajmer, Agra, Gwalior, Jhansi, Puducherry, Tirunelveli(Kanyakumari), Guntakal, Tiruchirapali, Ratlam, Kota, Nagpur, Itarsi, Chitaurgarh, Abu Road, Gandhidham etc. Sangli station is convenient to reach from Ashta.

=== Road ===
Ashta is located on New National Highway 166H and State Highway 151. The distance from Ashta to major cities are Sangli (20 km), Pune (225 km), Mumbai (350 km), Bengaluru (651 km)

== Demographics ==
As of 2011 India census, Ashta had a population of 37105. Male constitute 51% of the population and females 49%.

Town	Population	Hindu	Muslim	Christian	Sikh	Buddhist	Jain	Others	Not Stated
Ashta	37,105	77.11%	10.01%	0.24%	0.04%	1.90%	10.25%	0.01%	0.43%
