= Kirloskarwadi =

Kirloskarvadi
- City and town
- Location within Maharashtra
- Coordinates: 17°5′3.71″N 74°25′9.86″E
- Country: India
- State: Maharashtra
- District: Sangli
- Established: 1910
- Founder: Laxmanrao Kirloskar
- Elevation: 570 m (1,870 ft)

Languages
  - Official: Marathi, English
- Time zone: UTC+5:30 (IST)
- PIN: 416308
- Telephone code: 91 2346
- Vehicle registration: MH10
- Lok Sabha constituency: Sangli
- Vidhan Sabha constituency: Palus-Kadegaon

Kirloskarvadi is one of India's oldest industrial townships, developed around the Kirloskar Brothers Ltd factory in the Palus, Sangli district, in Maharashtra state, India. On 10 March 2010, Kirloskarvadi celebrated 100 years of its establishment. Kirloskarvadi is a rapidly growing satellite suburb of Palus city. The town has centric connectivity between Satara-Sangli-Kolhapur

== History ==
The town of Kirloskarwadi was founded by Laxmanrao Kirloskar in 1910 when he started his factory, called Kirloskar Brothers Ltd, near the railway station that was at that time called Kundal Road. Laxmanrao Kirloskar had read about "industrial townships" in Europe and USA where the owners of industries had built communities for the employees. His dream was to build his own industry and a community for the employees. The culmination of his dream is the town of Kirloskarwadi. Balasaheb Pant Pratinidhi, the ruler of the Aundh Sansthan, one of the many Indian Princely States under the British rule in India before independence, donated the land to Laxmanrao Kirloskar to establish the factory and the town. The factory around which the town was built is still the flagship manufacturing plant of Kirloskar Brothers Ltd

During Indian independence struggle, some of the militant revolutionary fighters who went underground to escape arrest took refuge in Kirloskarwadi. The workers from the factory took part in protests and satyagraha against the British rule. Two workers from the factory—Umashankar Pandya and Sadashiv Pendharkar—were killed when police opened fire on one such protest. An obelisk (Marathi: स्तंभ) and park in the town commemorate the sacrifices of these workers.

== Geography ==
Kirloskarvadi is located at 17.085°N 74.414°E. Kirloskarvadi is located in the Krishna (Marathi: कृष्णा) river valley. Sangli Palus, Satara, Pune and Kolhapur are the nearest cities.

== Industries and Nearest MIDC ==
Kirloskarvadi is founded in 1910 by laxmanrao kirloskar in palus taluka. Kirloskarvadi has biggest industrial hub and it is only 4.3 km from palus. There are many types of foundries and industries are located in kirloskarvadi. Nearest midc like Palus MIDC and Shiroli MIDC Kolhapur. Kirloskar Group main manufacturing plant is situated in Kirloskarvadi. It is very fast growing and developed area in Palus.

== Transportation ==
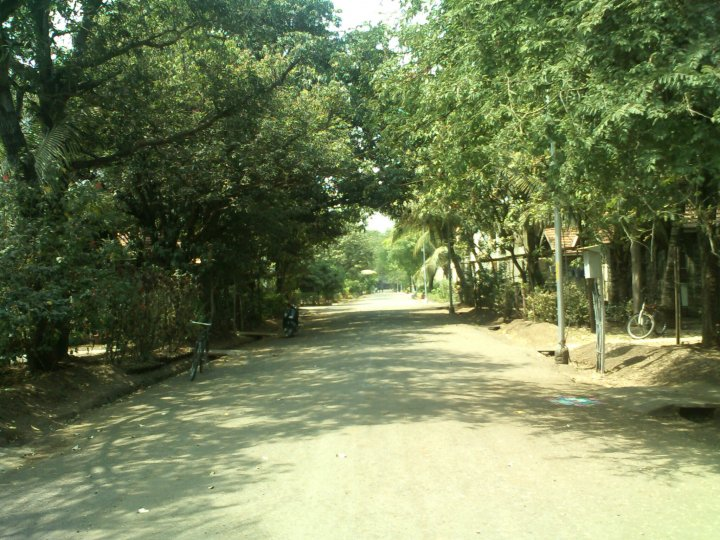
Road in Kirloskarwadi

The Kirloskarvadi railway station (KOV) is one of the important station on the Mumbai–Bangalore railway line managed by Central Railway, Pune division. This place is projected as Commercial Capital of South Maharashtra by Shri. Suresh Prabhu, Commerce Minister - Govt. of India. Currently double line electrification is in construction between Pune-Miraj and expected to be start first electric run trials from March 2019. There are trains to major cities like Delhi, Pune, Mumbai, Bangalore, Ahmedabad. Trains having stoppage here are Dadar Hubli Express, Sahyadri Express, Mahalaxmi Express, Maharashtra Express, Koyna Express, Pune-Miraj Express, Dadar-Satara express via Kurduvadi, Pandharpur, Sangli route. There is long time demand to have a halt for Chalukya Express and Ernakulum Express to Kirloskarwadi station as it will give good service to Vita, Islampur, Palus and Tasgaon Taluka residing Passengers. Sangli railway station is the nearest major railway station where all long-distance trains stop and is around 33 km from Kirloskarvadi.

There are Maharashtra State Road Transport Corporation (MSRTC) buses and private buses from Kirloskarvadi to Sangli, Kolhapur, Pune and Mumbai. There is also a private airport for Business Jets and a helipad for helicopters. Located in kirloskarwadi
