= Engineering in India =

From pre-historic to modern times, engineering has played an essential role in the development of India.

== History ==
Engineering in the country dates back to pre-historic times. Solar drying of agricultural commodities has been dated to a period of 6,000 BCE. Researchers have also found the evidences of engineering in Indus Valley civilization, dating back to 4th millennium BCE. Types of engineering such as Irrigation engineering, Transportation engineering were also established during this period. Throughout the period 3000 BCE – 1500 BCE, urban cities developed and included advanced developments for that time, such as brick houses, drainage systems, water harvesting, sanitation systems, etc.

Vedas contains the information on about wells, irrigation, dams, canals, and other factors of engineering.

By the period of 1,800 BCE, India had started to produce iron. In 500 BCE, Damascus steel was being produced in the country.

Kallanai Dam, also known as Grand Anicut of Tamil Nadu, was originally built around the 2nd century CE. Many of the estimated 39,400 reservoirs of Tamil Nadu were built during the period of 500 CE – 1500 CE.

== Education ==
Foundation of the Cooper's Hill College in 1875 aimed to train engineers for British India. Madras University is considered to be the first college of the country, to provide individual courses in mechanical engineering.

According to an estimate in 2010, there were over 3,800 engineering colleges in the country, compared to less than 100 engineering colleges in 1996.

== In culture ==
- 3 Idiots - A movie based on a story of three friends studying in an engineering college.

== See also ==
- List of Indian engineers
