= Patthe Bapurao =

Indian folk poet and balladeer (1866–1945)

- Born: Shridhar Krishna Kulkarni; 11 November 1866; Harnaksha Rethare, Walwa taluka, Sangli district
- Died: 22 December 1945 (aged 79); Poona
- Occupations: Folk poet of Tamasha and Lavnis

Patthe Bapurao (11 November 1866 – 22 December 1945), born Shridhar Krishna Kulkarni, was a renowned Indian folk poet and balladeer (shahir).

== Early life and education ==
Bapurao was born on 11 November 1866 in the village of Harnaksha Rethare, located in the Walwa taluka of Sangli district. His family engaged in bhiksha. He received his early education in English up to the third or fourth standard. He was married to Saraswati, a girl belonging to the Badve family.

During his school days, he gained recognition for his poetry and his powerful voice. Recognizing his talent, his school teacher sent him to the ruler of Aundh State. The ruler subsequently recommended him to the King of Baroda State, who helped place him for studies at an educational institution called Kalabhavan. At Kalabhavan, Bapurao studied mechanical engineering for one year.

== Career ==
After completing his engineering studies, Bapurao took up employment in the police department. While working this job, he developed a deep passion for tamasha (folk theatre) and eventually desired to establish his own independent troupe. Because his family environment was strictly orthodox, he initially faced difficulties and opposition at home.

Despite these challenges, he eventually resigned from his position in the police department to dedicate himself to folk art, beginning to compose and sing Lavanis. Upon learning of his work, other Tamasha performers came forward to join him. This led to the creation of his own Tamasha troupe (fad), where he began performing his melodious musical compositions under the stage name "Patthe Bapurao".

A prominent member of his troupe was Pawala, a beautiful woman from the Mahar caste, whom Bapurao loved deeply. Pawala's active partnership and support brought immense success and a renewed vitality to his Tamasha performances. Some accounts state that he married her after converting his caste from Brahmin to Mahar.

Notably, he visited B. R. Ambedkar in 1927 to donate the proceedings of eight Tamasha shows for the Mahar Satyagraha Fund, which campaigned for the entry of Dalits into temples; Ambedkar rejected this on moral grounds.

== Artistic style and later years ==
Bapurao composed a vast number of Lavanis across multiple traditional sub-genres, including Gaulan, Bhedik, Jhagadyachyo, Rangabajichyo, and Vagachyo. A portion of his works was compiled and published posthumously in three volumes in 1958, though many of his fine compositions remain unavailable.

Following the departure of Pawala from his life, Bapurao's Tamasha business entered a period of decline. Professionally and personally, he was known to have a generous yet lavish and pleasure-seeking temperament. His poetic language was characterized by its simple, direct, and transparent style.

== Personal life ==
He had a son Govind Shridhar Kulkarni and has daughter-in-law Nalini Govind Kulkarni. He also composed several Vags, dramatic and humorous skits, which were also popular.

== Death ==
He died on 22 December 1941 in Poona.

== Legacy ==
A road in Mumbai, earlier called Falkland Road, is named after him. In 1950, Raja Nene made a biopic on him.
