= Dhulappa Bhaurao Navale =

Indian politician

- Born: 15 January 1910; Ankalhop
- Died: 30 September 1988 (aged 78)

Dhulappa Bhaurao Navale (15 January 1910 – 30 September 1988) was an Indian freedom fighter. He was born in a Chaturtha Digambar Jain family at Ankalkhop. Navale lost his father and his elder brother in his childhood. He completed his education till matriculation. After completing school he started social work in Ankalkhop and surrounding villages.

== See also ==
- Chaturtha
- History of Maharashtra
- List of Jains
