= Rajaram Mane =

Indian politician (1928–1995)

Rajaram Shankkarao Mane (18 October 1928 – 4 December 1995) was an Indian politician who was member of the 6th, 7th, 8th, 9th and 10th Lok Sabha, representing Ichalkaranji (Lok Sabha constituency) in the state of Maharashtra. Mane was born in Maharashtra on 18 October 1928. He died on 4 December 1995, at the age of 67.
