= Sangli =

- City
- Sāṁgalī
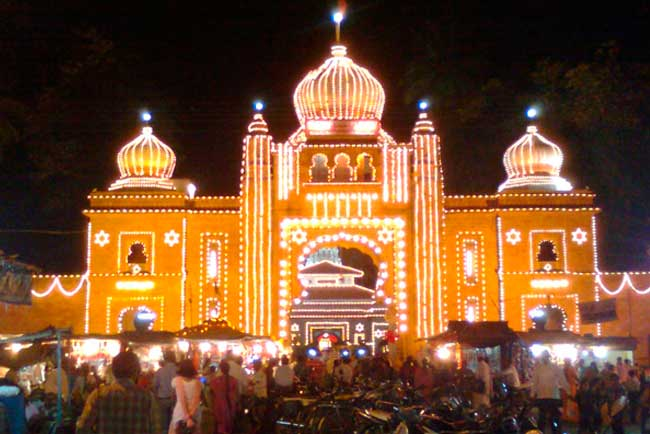
- Ganapati Temple, Heart of Sangli City

- Location within Maharashtra Location within India
- Coordinates: 16.853°N 74.583°E
- Country: India
- State: Maharashtra
- District: Sangli
- Founder: Patwardhan Dynasty

Government
  - Type: Municipal Corporation
  - Body: Sangali-Miraj-Kupwad Municipal Corporation (SMKMC)
  - Mayor: Dheeraj Suryavanshi (BJP)
  - Deputy Mayor: Gajanan Magdum (NCP)
  - Municipal commissioner: Shubham Gupta
  - Member of Parliament: Vishal Patil(Lok Sabha)

Area
  - City: 200.18 km^{2} (77.29 sq mi)
  - Metro: 361 km^{2} (139 sq mi)
- Elevation: 549 m (1,801 ft)

Population (2023)
  - City: 803,596
  - Density: 4,014.4/km^{2} (10,397/sq mi)
  - Metro: 856,832
- Demonym: Sanglikar

Languages
  - Official: Marathi
- Time zone: UTC+5:30 (IST)
- PIN: 416416,416415,416410,416436
- Telephone code: +91-233
- Vehicle registration: MH-10, MH-59 (Jath)
- Literacy: 88.93%
- Lok Sabha constituency: Sangli (Lok Sabha constituency)
- Climate: Dry and Arid (Köppen)
- Website: sangli.nic.in

Sangli (ISO: Sāṁgalī;) is a city and the headquarters of the Sangli District in Maharashtra, in south-western India. It has earned the nickname "Turmeric City of India" for being India's and Asia's largest hub for the production and global trade of this spice. Sangli is situated on the banks of the river Krishna and houses many sugar factories. A significant city in South-Western India, it lies 376 km from Mumbai, 230 km from Pune and 638 km from Bengaluru. The city is a significant healthcare hub, along with its twin city, Miraj. Sangli-Miraj-Kupwad combined has more than 1,000 hospitals and clinics, making it one of India's largest emerging medical hubs and an emerging international hub for treatment of patients, especially from west Asia (Gulf region). Sangli is also known for its grapes, raisins, jaggery and large number of sugar factories, with the district having more than 30 sugar factories. Sangli has the largest sugar factory in Asia and the most number of sugar factories in India. Sangli region boasts of the largest raisin market in Asia. Sangli-Miraj-Kupwad municipal corporation (SMKMC) along with its Urban Agglomeration consists of the satellite towns of Madhavnagar & Budhgaon, which is the 93rd biggest in India.

== Information ==
The Sangli Metropolitan Region has developed into a modern city with:

- broad roads,
- a major railway junction,
- malls &
- multiplexes,
- hotels, and
- excellent educational facilities.

It is also a significant city with telecommunication & entertainment facilities. A Software Technology Park is being set up in a prime location in the city. Nearby towns like:

- Ichalkaranji,
- Tasgaon,
- Ashta,
- Kavathe-Mahankal,
- Palus,
- Shirol and
- Jaysingpur

are now emerging as satellite cities to the Sangli Metropolitan Area. Krishna Valley Wine Park is a leading wine park in India. Sangli is the world's leading global hub for Turmeric trade; hence, it is also known as the Yellow City of India. Sangli city is also emerging as the Chess City of India. Sangli city has significant political influence in Maharashtra. 95% of Sangli city's population speaks Marathi language.

== Transportation ==
=== Railway Station ===
Sangli Railway Station and Vishrambag railway station are the railwayconnection of Sangli City. Many long-route trains stop at Sangli city providing connectivity to important cities of India. Sangli city station is directly connected to important cities.

- Sangli-Bengaluru Rani Chennamma Express,
- Sangli-Parli Vaijnath DEMU express and
- Sangli-Miraj DEMU train
- Bengaluru-Sangli Rani Chennamma Express,
- ParliVaijnath-Sangli DEMU express and
- Kolhapur-Sangli DEMU train

=== Road Transportation ===
MSRTC has a Divisional Office at Sangli and bus depots & terminals at Sangli and Miraj within city limits. Direct buses connect to:

- Pune,
- Mumbai,
- Solapur,
- Kolhapur,
- Pandharpur,
- Akkalkot,
- Parbhani,
- Nanded,
- Latur,
- Shegaon,
- Beed,
- Chatrapati Sambhaji Nagar,
- Ahmednagar,
- Panjim,
- Ratnagiri,
- Satara,
- Nashik,
- Hyderabad

and many more cities in:

- Maharashtra and
- Karnataka.

== Geography ==
Sangli City is situated on the bank of the Krishna River, the valley and tributaries offer many irrigation and agricultural advantages that drive the economy of the district and the city. Other small rivers, such as the Warana River and the Panchganga, flow into the Krishna River.

== Municipal Finance ==
According to financial data published on the CityFinance Portal of the Ministry of Housing and Urban Affairs, the Sangli–Miraj–Kupwad Municipal Corporation reported total revenue receipts of ₹329 crore (US$40 million) and total expenditure of ₹349 crore (US$42 million) in 2022–23. Tax revenue accounted for about 17.0% of the total revenue, while the corporation received ₹178 crore (US$21 million) in grants during the financial year.

== History ==
The region, known as Kundal (now a tiny village 40 km away from Sangli city) in medieval India, was the capital of the Chalukya Empire in the 12th century AD. During the time of Chhatrapati Shivaji Maharaj, Sangli, Miraj and surrounding areas were captured from the Mughal Empire. Until 1801, Sangli was included in Miraj Jahangir. Sangli separated from Miraj in 1801, following a family quarrel between Chintamanrao Patwardhan and his paternal uncle, Gangadharrao Patwardhan, who had succeeded his childless elder brother as the sixth chief of Miraj in 1782.

Sangli is notable for the Brindavana (tomb) of Satyavrata Tirtha, a saint of the Dvaita Order of Vedanta and Peetadipathi of Uttaradi Math who took Samadhi in Sangli in the year 1638.

Prior to the reorganisation of districts after Indian independence, the area comprising the present-day Sangli district formed part of the larger Satara region during the Bombay Presidency under British India.

Following the formation of the state of Maharashtra in 1960, administrative boundaries were reorganised, and Sangli district was officially constituted in 1961.

Owing to its geographical location in the southern portion of the former Satara region, the area has been informally referred to in regional usage as "South Satara".

Sangli is well known as Natya Pandhari (Capital of Marathi Dramas) while Miraj is well known for manufacturing & exports of musical instruments.

== Etymology ==
The city's original name was Sahagalli—from the Marathi words Saha ("six") and Galli ("lanes") describing the early street plan—which was later shortened to Sangli.

== Tourist and Pilgrim Places ==
- Sangameshwar Shiva Temple, Haripur, Sangli
- Sri Sri Radha Gopal Mandir, Aravade, Tasgaon
- Ramling Bet Bahe Ancient Shiva Temple, Sangli
- Audumbar, Sangli
- Jwala Narshimhapur, Kole, Sangli
- Sagareshwar Wild Life Sanctuary
- Chandoli National Park
- Dandoba Hill Station
- Khanapur Wild Life Reserve Forest
- Panchayatan Temple, Sangli
- Bagetil Ganapati Temple, Sangli
- Kundal Jain Hill Temple, Palus, Sangli
- Zari Parshwanath Hill Temple, Palus, Sangli
- Bahubali Hill Temple, Kumbhoj
- Narsobawadi
- Khidrapur Kopeshwar Shiva Temple
- Prachitgad Fort
- Machindragad Fort
- Vikasgad Fort
- Khawaja shamna mira dargah Miraj
- khawaja kabir dargah nandre

== Culture ==
Food

Flavored rice puff from Sangli, called Bhadang, is world famous and is exported to US, UK, Canada, and Southeast Asia. Stuffed eggplant/ brinjal known as Bharala Wangi, with bhakri, is one of the most popular dishes in Sangli.

== Educational institutes ==
Education institutions in the area, aside from schools, include:

- Walchand College of Engineering, Sangli.
- Chintamanrao College of Commerce, Vishrambaugh, Sangli.
- Sanjay Bhokare Group of Institutes, Miraj.
- RIT College Sakhrale, Islampur.
- Government Medical College And Hospital, Miraj.
- City Highschool, Sangli.
- Raje. Patwardhan Highschool Sangli.
- Government Polytechnic, Miraj.
- Padmabhooshan Vasantraodada Patil Institute Of Technology, Budhgaon.
- Kbp College, Sangli.
- Annasaheb Dange College of Engineering & Technology, Sangli.
- Government Medical College, Miraj,
- Willingdon College of Arts & Science at Vishrambaug, Sangli.
- Prakash Institute of Medical Science and Research, Islampur, Sangli.
- Bharati Vidyapeeth Deemed University Medical College and Hospital, a college constituting under Bharati Vidyapeeth

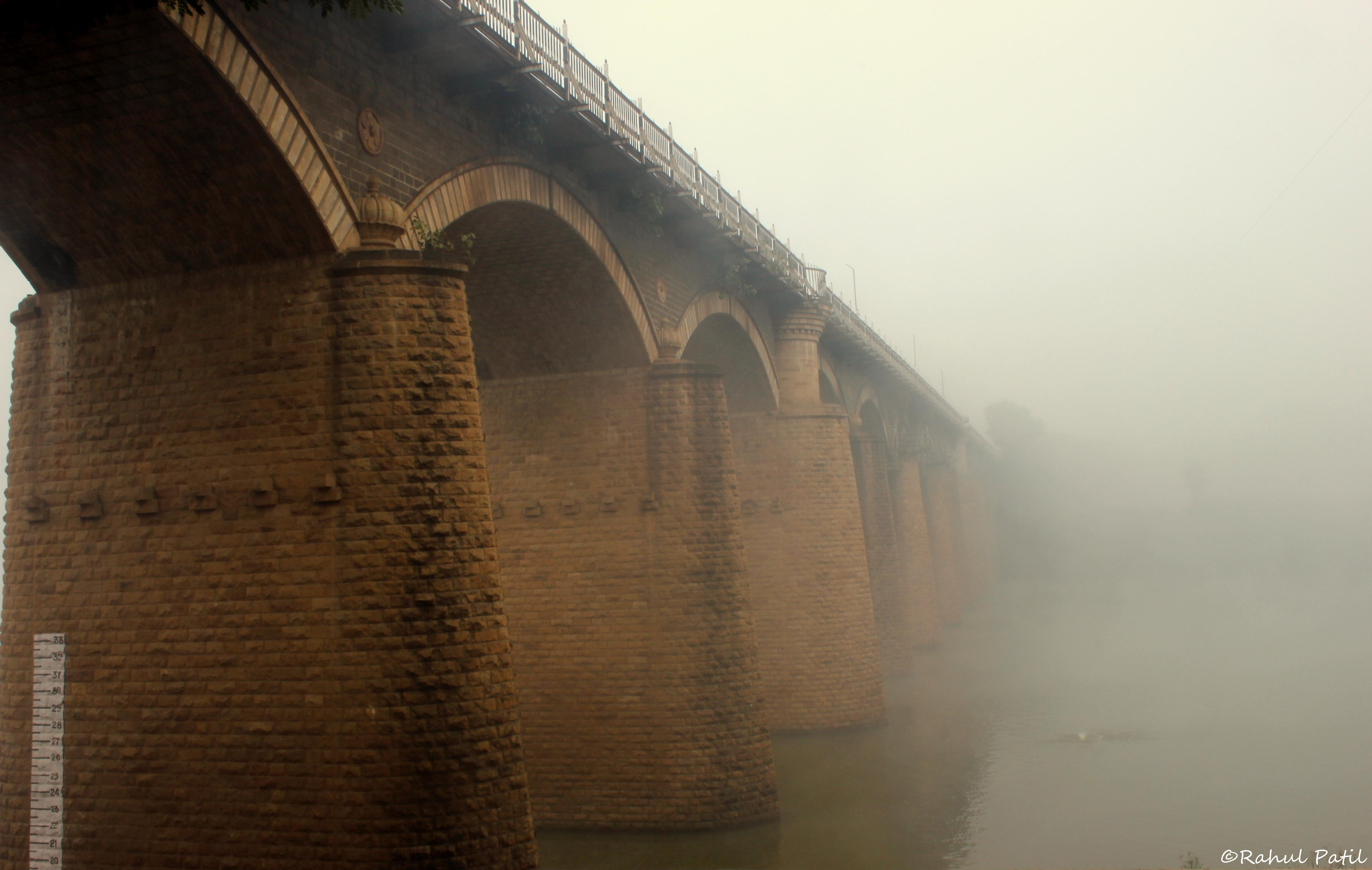
Irwin Bridge, Sangli.

== Climate ==
Sangli

Climate chart (precipitation, max. and min. temperature)
J	F	M	A	M	J	J	A	S	O	N	D
3.8 31 12	0.5 33 15	5.3 36 18	22 38 21	48 37 22	71 31 22	109 28 21	80 28 21	100 30 20	89 32 19	34 30 16	6.9 30 13
- █ Average max. and min. temperatures in °C
- █ Precipitation totals in mm
- Source: Government of Maharashtra
Imperial conversion
J	F	M	A	M	J	J	A	S	O	N	D
0.1 88 54	0 91 59	0.2 97 64	0.9 100 70	1.9 99 72	2.8 88 72	4.3 82 70	3.1 82 70	3.9 86 68	3.5 90 66	1.3 86 61	0.3 86 55
- █ Average max. and min. temperatures in °F
- █ Precipitation totals in inches

Sangli has a semi-arid climate with three seasons. Summer takes place from the middle of February to the middle of June, characterised by largely dry conditions towards the start, with rainfall increasing as the season progresses. Temperatures in summer are primarily characterised by hot days and mild nights. Monsoon takes place from the middle of June to late October. Rainfall is more common this season than at any other time of year. Temperatures in the monsoon season are characterised by warm, humid days and mild, humid nights. Winter takes place from early November to early February. This season is mainly dry, with rain primarily concentrated in November. Temperatures in winter are characterised by warm days and cool nights. The total rainfall is around 22 inches (580 mm).

Sangli has been ranked 24th best “National Clean Air City” under (Category 2 3-10L Population cities) in India.

Sangli has cleanest air quality in state in 2024.

Climate data for Sangli (1991–2020)
Month	Jan	Feb	Mar	Apr	May	Jun	Jul	Aug	Sep	Oct	Nov	Dec	Year
Record high °C (°F)	36.1 (97.0)	40.0 (104.0)	42.3 (108.1)	43.0 (109.4)	42.9 (109.2)	41.6 (106.9)	35.8 (96.4)	34.8 (94.6)	36.5 (97.7)	39.2 (102.6)	35.1 (95.2)	34.5 (94.1)	43.0 (109.4)
Mean daily maximum °C (°F)	31.6 (88.9)	34.0 (93.2)	37.1 (98.8)	38.4 (101.1)	37.4 (99.3)	31.7 (89.1)	28.7 (83.7)	28.4 (83.1)	30.4 (86.7)	31.9 (89.4)	31.8 (89.2)	30.9 (87.6)	32.6 (90.7)
Mean daily minimum °C (°F)	14.8 (58.6)	16.3 (61.3)	19.3 (66.7)	21.9 (71.4)	22.5 (72.5)	22.2 (72.0)	21.5 (70.7)	21.2 (70.2)	20.9 (69.6)	20.5 (68.9)	18.0 (64.4)	14.9 (58.8)	19.5 (67.1)
Record low °C (°F)	7.0 (44.6)	8.4 (47.1)	11.0 (51.8)	14.2 (57.6)	15.5 (59.9)	18.4 (65.1)	18.5 (65.3)	17.4 (63.3)	14.1 (57.4)	13.3 (55.9)	8.7 (47.7)	6.5 (43.7)	6.5 (43.7)
Average rainfall mm (inches)	0.3 (0.01)	0.1 (0.00)	6.2 (0.24)	22.0 (0.87)	41.1 (1.62)	140.8 (5.54)	120.6 (4.75)	95.6 (3.76)	116.2 (4.57)	136.5 (5.37)	20.5 (0.81)	1.8 (0.07)	701.8 (27.63)
Average rainy days	0.1	0.1	0.5	1.5	2.5	8.4	10.8	9.6	7.6	6.4	1.5	0.1	49.0
Average relative humidity (%) (at 17:30 IST)	39	31	30	32	44	67	76	76	69	58	49	46	51
Source: India Meteorological Department

== Notable people ==
=== Social Reformers/ Freedom fighters ===
- Vasantdada Patil
- Nagnath Naikwadi
- Annabhau Sathe
- Gopal Ganesh Agarkar
- Gulabrao Patil
- Dhulappa Bhaurao Navale

=== Entertainment/ literature/ culture/ music/ cinema ===
- Bal Gandharva
- Asha Bhosale
- Patthe Bapurao
- Gajanan Digambar Madgulkar
- Vishnudas Bhave
- Sai Tamhankar
- Vyankatesh Digambar Madgulkar

=== Sports ===
- Vijay Hazare
- Smriti Mandhana is from Madhavnagar
- Armaan Jaffer

=== Politics ===
- Yashwantrao Chavan
- Vasantdada Patil
- Patangrao Kadam
- Madanbhau Vishwanath Patil
- Jayant Patil
- R. R. Patil
- Rohit R.R. Patil
- Dhulappa Bhaurao Navale
- Ramdas Athawale
- Vishwajeet Patangrao Kadam
- Gopichand Padalkar
- Sanjay (kaka) Patil

=== Officers ===
- Vishwas Nangare Patil (IPS)
- Rajaram Mane (IAS)

== Notable people ==
- Vasantdada Patil
- Murlikant Petkar
- Vishnudas Bhave
- Smriti Mandhana
- Vijay Hazare
- Nandu Natekar
- Sai Tamhankar
- Vishnudas Bhave
- Asha Bhosle
- Balgandharva
- Vishnu Sakharam Khandekar
- Bhagyashree Patwardhan
- Yashwantrao Chavan
- Patangrao Kadam
- R.R. Patil
- Annabhau Sathe
