= Madhavnagar =

- Suburb
- Location in Maharashtra, India
- Coordinates: 16.8917°N 74.597°E
- Country: India
- State: Maharashtra
- District: Sangli

Population (2001)
  - Total: 10,993

Languages
  - Official: Marathi
- Time zone: UTC+5:30 (IST)

Madhavnagar is a small city in Sangli and a suburb of Sangli Urban area in the Sangli district in the Indian state of Maharashtra. The most popular sport is kabaddi.

== Demographics ==
As of 2001 India census, Madhavnagar had a population of 10,993. Males constituted 51% of the population and females 49%. Madhavnagar had an average literacy rate of 74%, higher than the national average of 59.5%: male literacy was 80%, while female literacy reached 67%. 12% of the population was under 6 years of age.

== Economy ==
It is the industrial zone in Sangli district. Madhavnagar is one of biggest villages in Miraj Taluka. Many textile mills are situated there.

== Geography ==
It is 4 km from Sangli and 12 km from Miraj on Sangli - Tasgaon Road. Earlier it was called Maharashtra's Manchester as same Ichalkaranji, Malegaon. The village has seven prominent colonies on both sides of main road, including Ravivar peth, Somvar peth and Shaniwar peth.

== Transport ==
Madhavnagar has a railway station. Only passengers are stop at station. It is situated on one of the main rail routes in india.

== Notable people ==
- Indian Women Cricketer Smriti Mandhana.
- Madhavrao Patvardhan gave his name to this village.
- Madan Patil, Ex Minister Govt. of Maharashtra.
- Shree Devkaran Surajkaran Malu was the first Sarpanch of the Gram panchayat Madhavnagar.
