= Sangli district =

District of Maharashtra in India

Coordinates: 16°51′36″N 74°34′12″E

- District of Maharashtra
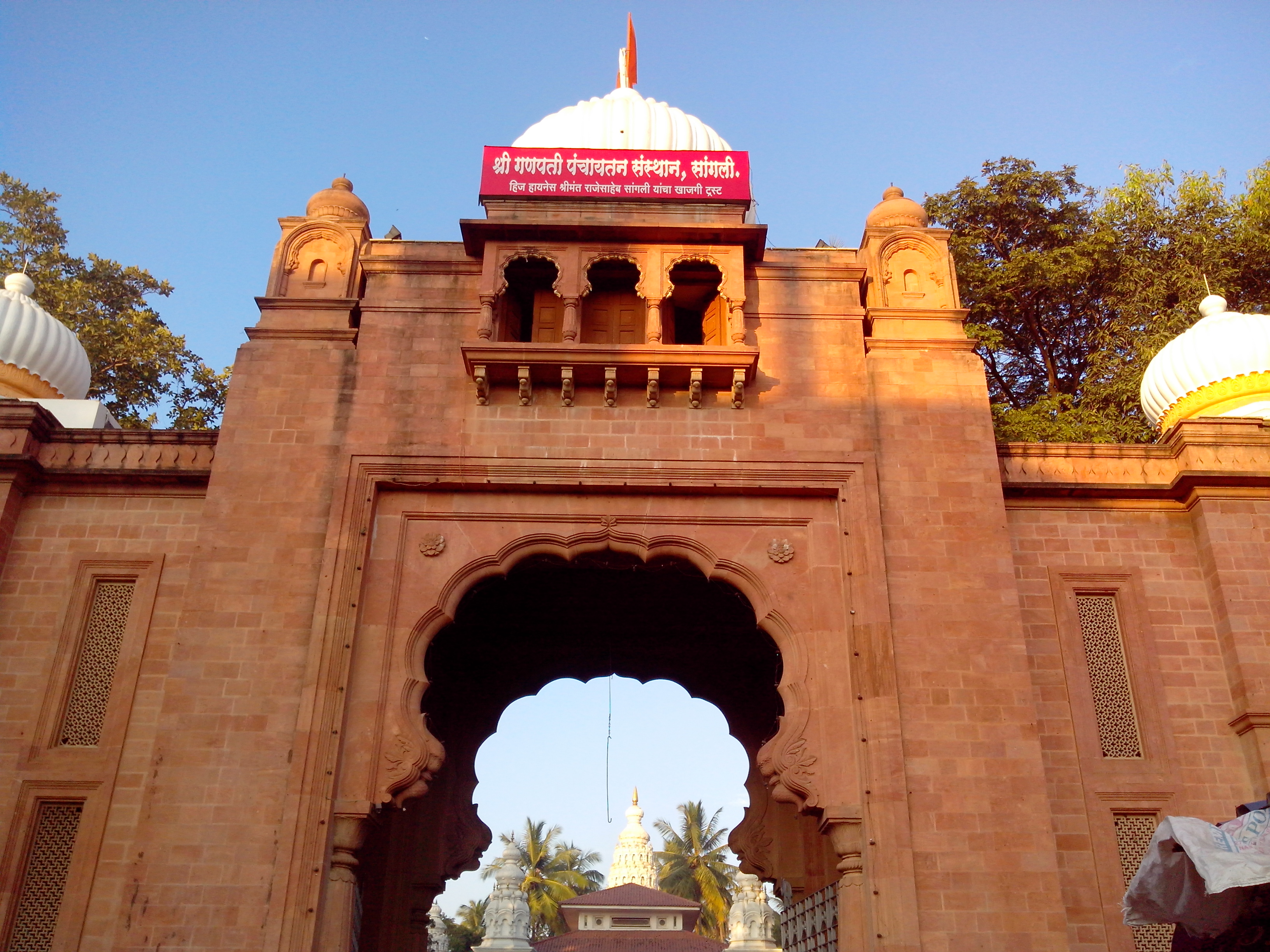
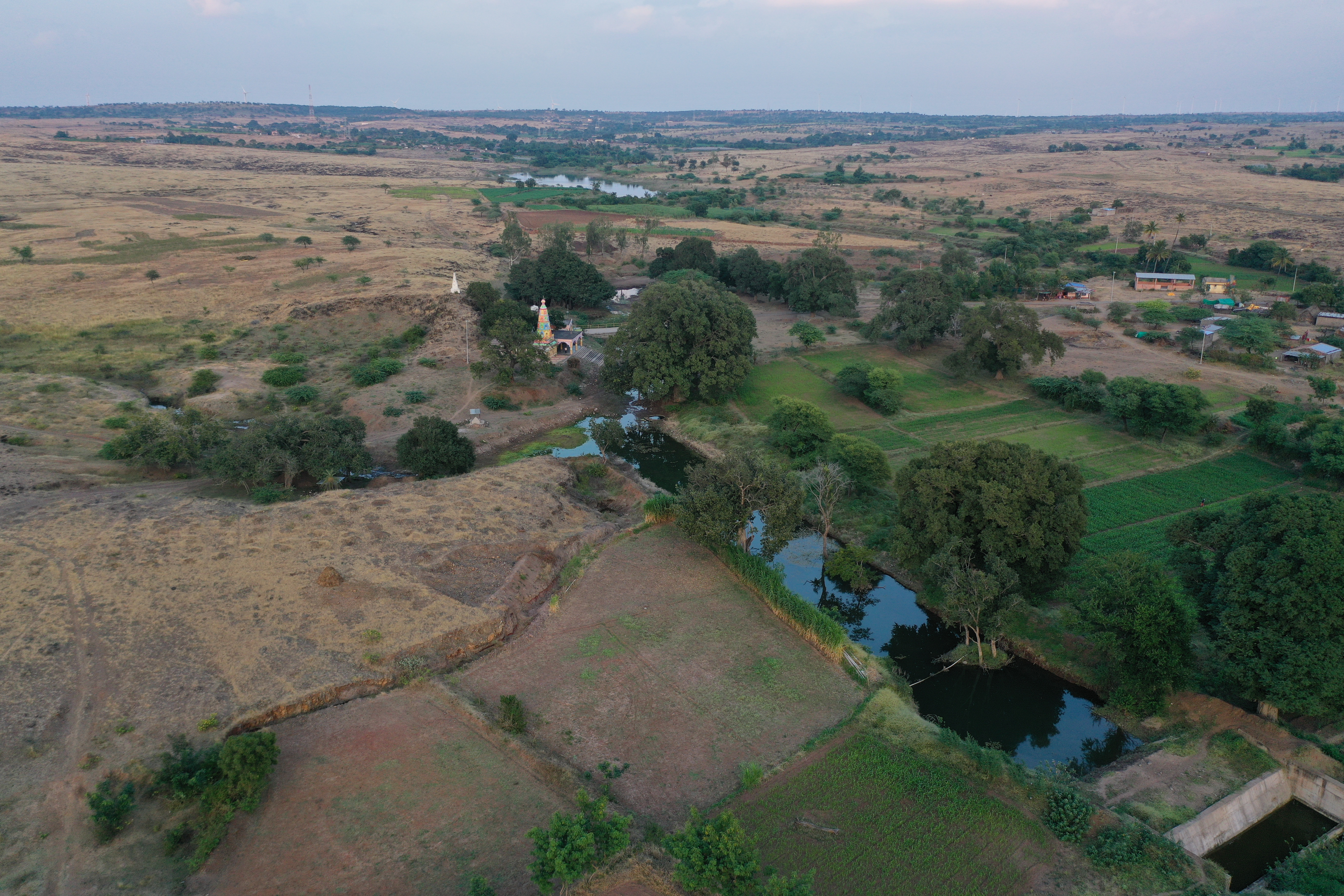
- Top: Ganapati Mandir, Sangli; Bottom: View of Khalati village

- Location in Maharashtra
- Sangli district
- Country: India
- State: Maharashtra
- Division: Pune
- Headquarters: Sangli
- Talukas: Miraj; Palus; Tasgaon; Kavathe-Mahankal; Jat, Sangli; Khanapur; Atpadi; Walwa; Kadegaon; Shirala

Government
  - Body: Sangli Zilla Parishad
  - Guardian Minister: Chandrakant Patil (Cabinet Minister)
  - President Z. P. Sangli: NA
  - District Collector: Mr. Dr. Raja dayanidhi IAS
  - CEO Z. P. Sangli: NA
  - MPs: Vishal Patil (Sangli); Dhairyasheel Sambhajirao Mane (Hatkanangle)

Area
  - Total: 8,572 km^{2} (3,310 sq mi)

Population (2023)
  - Total: 3,139,974
  - Density: 366.3/km^{2} (948.7/sq mi)
  - Urban: 31.11%

Demographics
  - Literacy: 82.62 %
  - Sex ratio: 981
- Time zone: UTC+05:30 (IST)
- Major highways: NH-4, NH-204
- Average annual precipitation: 400–450 mm
- Website: sangli.nic.in

Sangli district (Marathi pronunciation: [saːŋɡli]) is a district of Maharashtra state in India. Sangli city is the district headquarters. It is bordered by Satara district, Solapur district to the North, Karnataka state to the South-East, by Kolhapur district to South-West and by narrow portion on the East side to Ratnagiri district. It is present on the southern tip of Maharashtra.

The district is 31.11% urban. Sangli and Miraj are the largest cities. The second oldest industrial township like Kirloskarwadi (Palus) is also located in Sangli district. Industrialist Laxmanrao Kirloskar started his first factory here. It is known as the sugar bowl of India due to its high sugarcane productivity. Sangli district is one of the most fertile and highly developed districts in Maharashtra. The district is very popular as a political powerhouse in the state. It has provided many politicians and bureaucrats and is often referred to as the Heaven of Farmers.

== Officers ==
=== Members of Parliament ===
- Vishal Patil (Indian National Congress)

Sangli (Lok Sabha constituency)

=== Guardian minister ===
Guardian Minister Sangil
- पालकमंत्री सांगली
- Emblem of India
- Incumbent; Chandrakant Patil since 18 January 2025
- Style: The Honourable
- Residence: Sangil
- Appointer: Chief Minister of Maharashtra
- Term length: 5 years / No time limit
- Website: sangil.gov.in/en/

==== List of guardian ministers ====
Name	Term of office
Chandrakant Patil	31 October 2014 - 8 November 2019
Jayant Patil	9 January 2020 - 29 June 2022
Suresh Khade	24 September 2022 - 26 November 2024
Chandrakant Patil	18 January 2025 - Incumbent

=== District magistrates/collectors ===
District Magistrate / Collector Sangil
- जिल्हाधिकारी तथा जिल्हदंडाधिकरी सांगली
- Emblem of India
- Incumbent; Mr. Dr. Abhijeet Chaudhari (IAS) since 2019
- Residence: At Sangil district
- Appointer: Government of Maharashtra
- Term length: No time limit
- Website: sangil.gov.in/en/

== History ==
The district of Sangli is a recent creation, being made as late as in 1949. It was then known as South Satara and it has been renamed as Sangli since 1 May 1960. It is partly made up of a few talukas which once formed part of the old Satara District and partly of the States and jahagirs belonging to Patvardhans, and Dafles which came to be merged during the post-independence period. Kundal, the region around Sangli, was the capital of the Chalukyas. Kundal is an ancient village, around 1,600 years old, and also an important Jain pilgrimage site. Its ancient name was Kaundinyapura. Kundal has also been the home to freedom fighters like Krantisinha Nana Patil, Krantiveer Captain Akaram (Dada) Pawar, Shyamrao Lad, Captain Ramchandra Lad, G.D. Lad, Shankar Jangam and Hausabai Jangam.

== Geography ==
Sangli District is located in the western part of Maharashtra. It is bounded by Satara and Solapur districts to the north, Bijapur District (Karnataka) to the east, Kolhapur and Belgaum (Karnataka) districts to the south, and Ratnagiri District to the west.

Sangli District is situated in the river basins of the Warna and Krishna rivers. Other small rivers, such as the Warana River and the Panchganga, flow into the River Krishna. Land in the region is suitable for agriculture.

Sangli district has distinct kind of environment. Eastern talukas of Shirala, Walwa, Palus are prone to high rainfall and floods. 2005 floods submerged many villages like Dudhondi, Bhilawadi, amnapur, Punadi, Khed, walwa etc.

Western talukas are famous for drought and tanker driven drinking water supply systems. But recent projects like Tembhu-Mhaisal yojana, Takari prakalp ( located in takari town & water lifted & stored in Sagareshwar wildlife sanctuary area), Vita water scheme (located in Dudhondi and Ghogoan village) are changing the water landscape of these talukas. These water projects are located on river Krishna.

Sagareshwar Wildlife Sanctuary is a protected area in the Indian state of Maharashtra. It is located at the meeting of three Tehsils of Sangli district: Kadegaon, Walva and Palus. The wildlife sanctuary is man-made; it is an artificially cultivated forest without a perennial supply of water, and most of the wildlife species were artificially introduced. It has an area of 10.87 km^{2}.

== Tourism ==
The sanctuary is a popular tourist destination, with the peak tourism season from August to February. The most popular tourist activity is hiking to the top of a hill in the sanctuary, from which one can see the Krishna River flowing through fields of sugarcane and grapevines. Also in the area are numerous shrines to Shiva which were built during the Chalukya dynasty, and Kundal is the region around Sangli, was the capital of the Chalukyas. Kundal is a historical place. Chandoli Tiger Reserve is famous for animals like tigers, hyenas, foxes, wolves, and peacocks. Prachitgad is an ancient fort in Chandoli Tiger Reserve. Also Dandoba Hill station, Chourangi nath hill station, Banurgad, Shukacharya, Machindrahad fort, Revansiddha temple are famous tourist attractions in Sangli District.

== About Sagareshwar ==
The Sagareshwar sanctuary has much religious, cultural and archaeological significance. The sanctuary derives its name from an ancient famous Shiva temple that attracts many devotees. It actually consists of one large temple and a complex of 51 small temples, all from the Satvahana period. You will find the Kamal Bhairao temple, partially hewn from hard Basalt rock perched on the edge of a steep cliff. The entrance to the temple is through a narrow trench.

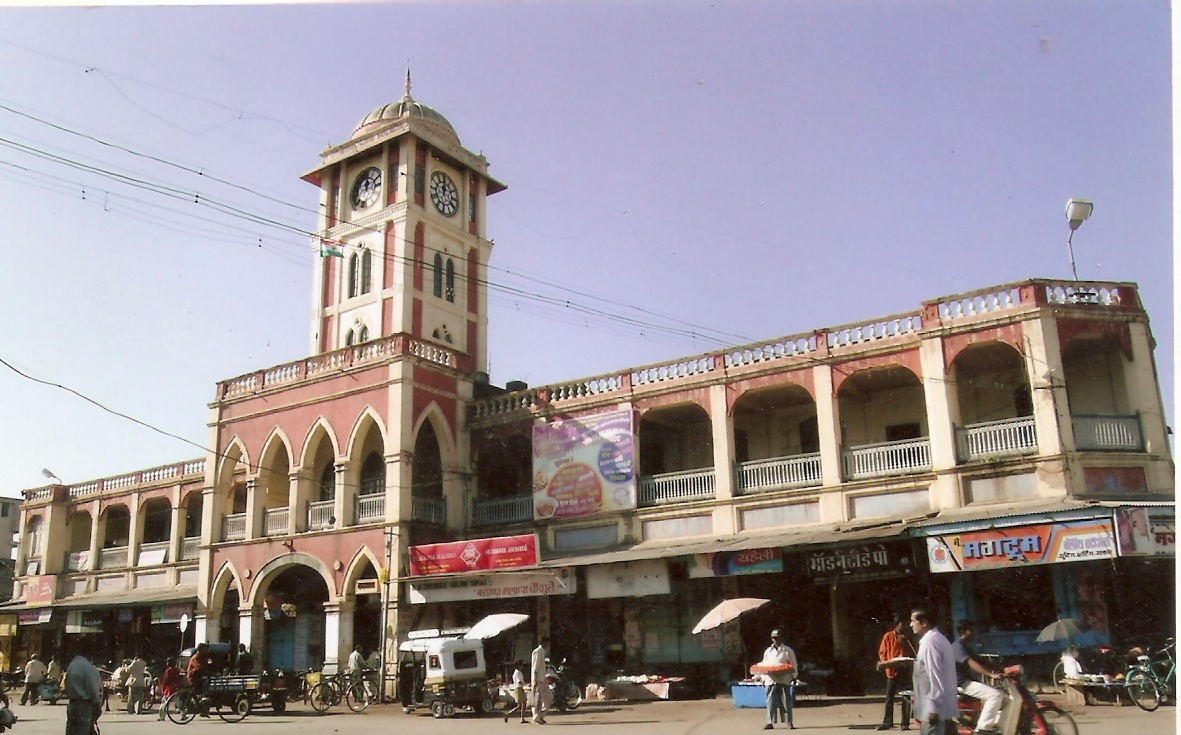
Laxmi Market, Miraj

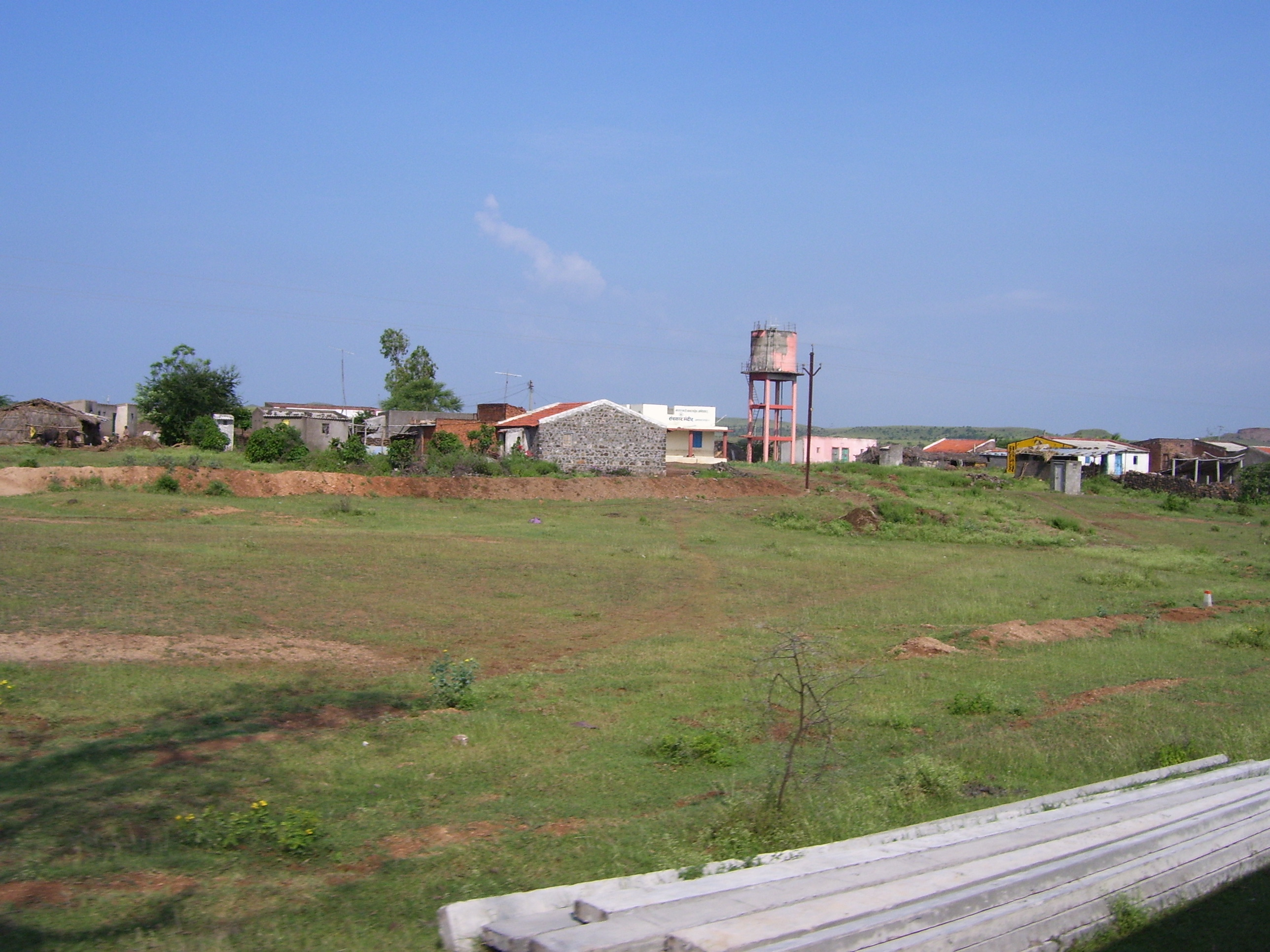
A village in Sangli district

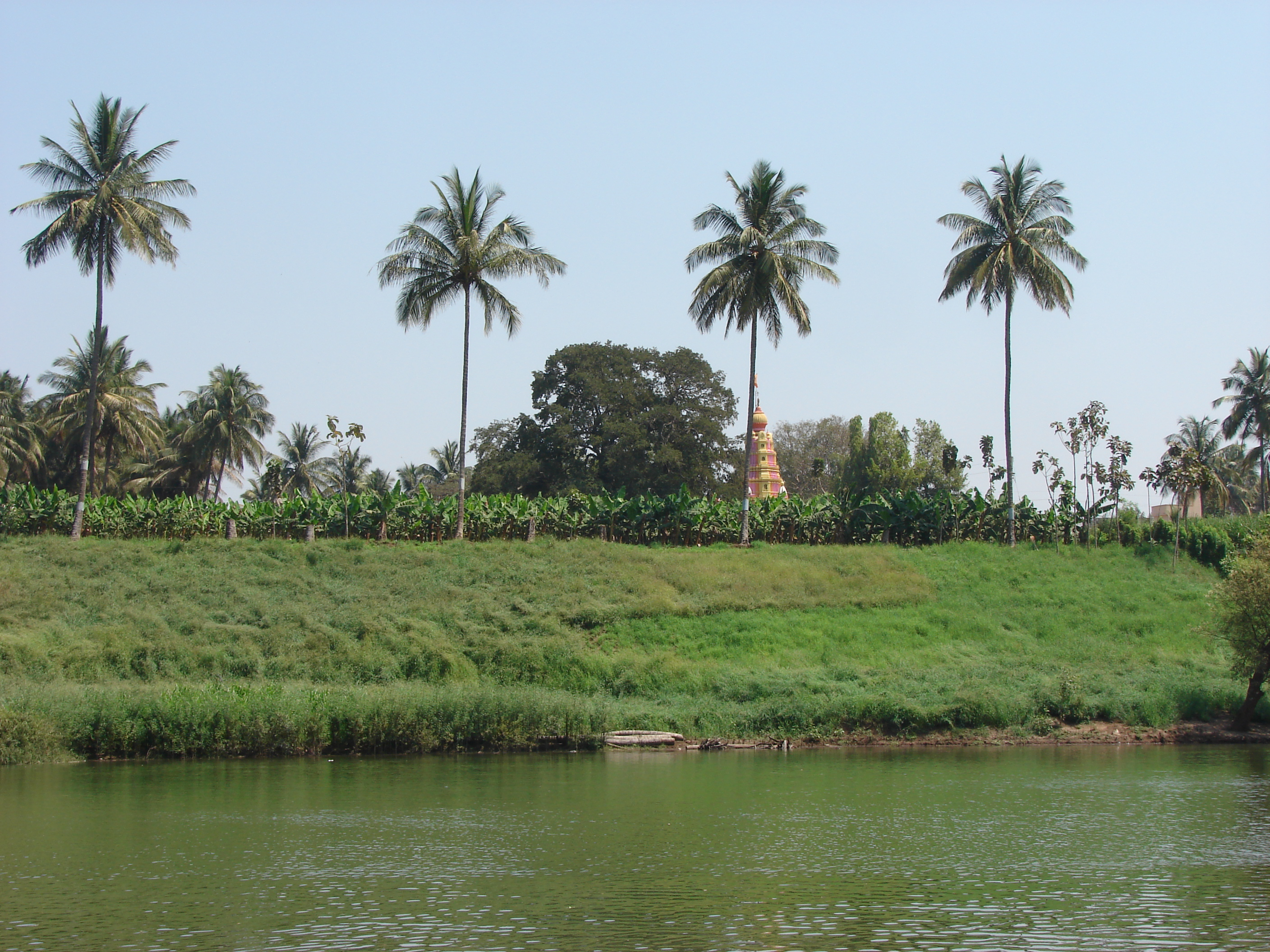
Bhubaneshwari Devi at river bank Palus

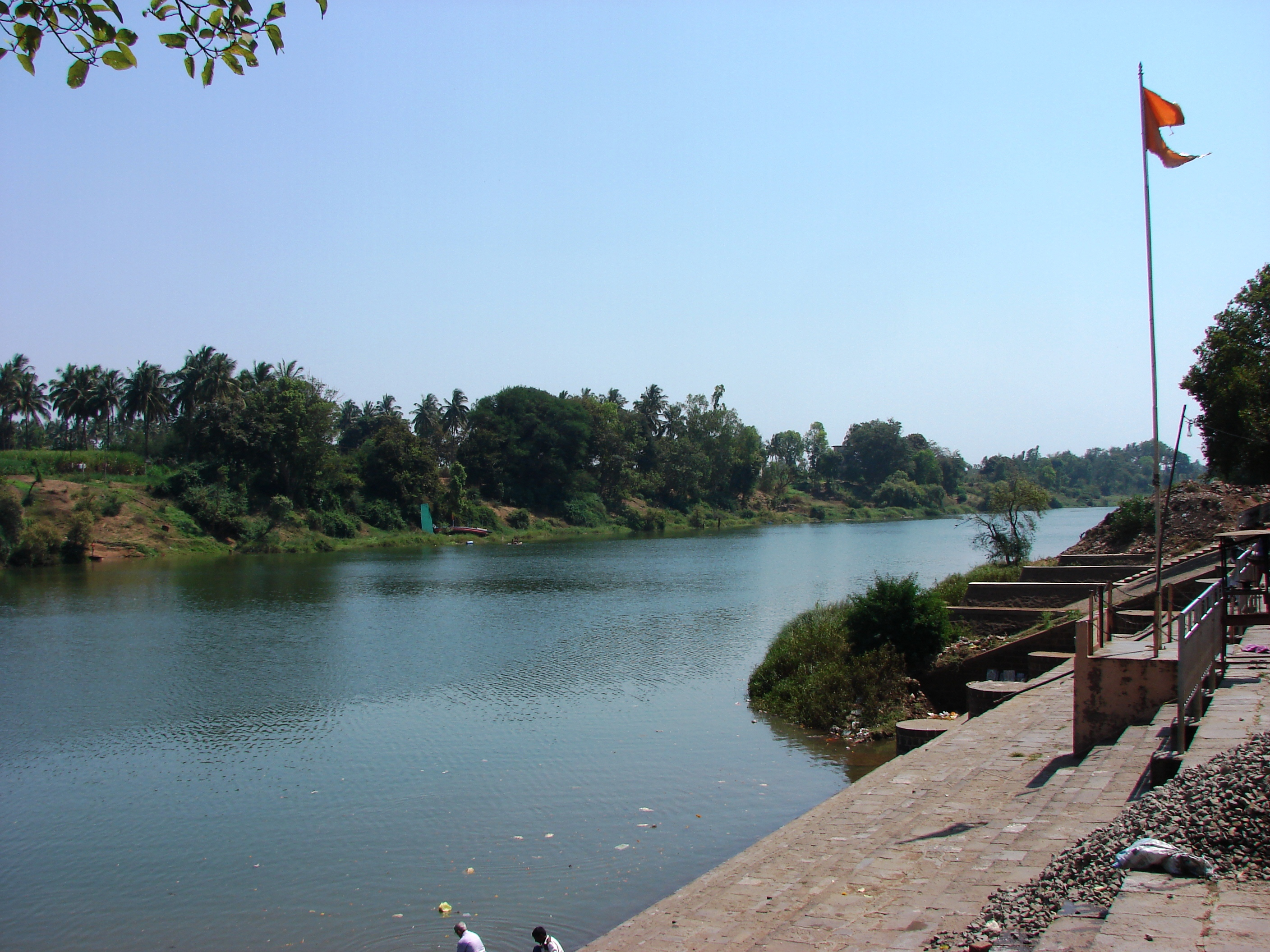
Shreekshetra Audumbar River Bank Palus

== Demographics ==
Historical population
Year	Pop.	±% p.a.
1901	645,696	—
1911	613,751	−0.51%
1921	597,371	−0.27%
1931	708,858	+1.73%
1941	814,449	+1.40%
1951	1,000,375	+2.08%
1961	1,232,986	+2.11%
1971	1,542,560	+2.27%
1981	1,834,293	+1.75%
1991	2,209,488	+1.88%
2001	2,583,524	+1.58%
2011	2,822,143	+0.89%

According to the 2011 census Sangli District has a population of 2,822,143, roughly equal to the nation of Jamaica or the US state of Kansas. This gives it a ranking of 137th in India (out of a total of 640). The district has a population density of 329 inhabitants per square kilometre (850/sq mi). Its population growth rate over the decade 2001–2011 was 9.18%. Sangli has a sex ratio of 964 females for every 1000 males, and a literacy rate of 82.62%. 25.49% of the population lived in urban areas. Scheduled Castes and Scheduled Tribes make up 12.51% and 0.65% of the population respectively.

Religions in Sangli district (2011)
Religion	Percent
Hinduism	86.47%
Islam	8.49%
Jainism	3.10%
Buddhism	1.35%
Other or not stated	0.59%

Hinduism is followed by 86.47% of district population. Islam is second largest religion in Sangli district followed by 8.49% of district population. There are significant Jain minorities of 3.1% in Sangli city.

Languages of Sangli district (2011)
1. Marathi (86.0%)
2. Hindi (5.22%)
3. Kannada (5.09%)
4. Urdu (2.38%)
5. Telugu (0.50%)
6. Gujarati (0.36%)
7. Others (0.48%)

At the time of the 2011 Census of India, 85.97% of the population in the district spoke Marathi, 5.09% Kannada, 4.73% Hindi and 2.38% Urdu as their first language.

== Administration ==
Sangli District is composed of 10 talukas, listed below with their populations at the 2011 Census:

- Shirala (162,911)
- Walwa (456,002)
- Palus (164,909)
- Kadegaon (143,019)
- Khanapur (Vita) (170,214)
- Atpadi (138,455)
- Tasgaon (251,401)
- Miraj (854,581)
- Kavathe-Mahankal (152,327)
- Jat, Sangli (328,324)

== Culture ==
Kundal is near Veerbhadra Temple Hill. This temple has 300 years of history. Kundalis a pilgrimage centre for the Digambar Jains, with thousands of Jains visiting each year. There is a temple built in the memory of Maharaja Jaising.

Kundal is surrounded by hills, including Zari Parshwanath. Water from the trough cascades near the idol of Mahaveer. Two caves house the idol of Mahaveer and the images of Rama, Sita, and Lakshman. Samav Sharan, a large open space on top of another hill, is considered holy by the Jains. They believe that Mahaveer gave sermons to his followers here.

Another village, Dudhondi (sharing a boundary with Kundal), is famous for Shiv-Bhavani temple. This is only second temple with idols of Maratha king Shivaji and goddess Bhavani in Maharashtra. First one is at Tuljapur, Usmanabad.

Shri-kshetra (religious place) Audumbur has a temple dedicated to Shri-guru-Datta.

== Notable people ==
=== Social reformers / freedom fighters ===
- Vasantdada Patil
- Nagnath Naikwadi
- Annabhau Sathe
- Gopal Ganesh Agarkar
- Gulabrao Patil
- गणपत लाड (G D BAPU LAD)
- Karmveer Bhaurao Patil
- Dhulappa Bhaurao Navale
- Rajarambapu patil
- Mahavir Pandurang Salunkhe
- Gajwant Gajanan Bhau Patil (Kameri)
- Prof. Bidesh Tukaram Kulkarni
- Justice Bhalchandra Bapusaheb Vagyani

=== Entertainment ===
- Bal Gandharva
- Asha Bhosale
- Patthe Bapurao
- Gajanan Digambar Madgulkar
- Vishnudas Bhave
- Sai Tamhankar
- Vyankatesh Digambar Madgulkar
- Vinayak Mahadev Kulkarni
- Shankarrao Kharat
- Vilas Rakate
- Priyadarshini Indalkar

=== Sports ===
- Vijay Hazare
- Smriti Mandhana
- Armaan Jaffer

=== Politics ===
- Yashwantrao Chavan
- Vasantdada Patil
- Patangrao Kadam
- Jayant Patil
- R. R. Patil
- Dhulappa Bhaurao Navale
- Ramdas Athawale
- Vishwajeet Patangrao Kadam
- Sanjaykaka Patil
- Vasantrao Anandrao Naik
- Fattesing Anandrao Naik
- Nanasaheb Mahadik
- Ramdas Athavale
- Gopichand Padalkar
- Annasaheb Dange

=== Officers ===
- Vishwas Nangare Patil (IPS)
- Rajaram Mane (IAS)
- Shrikar Keshav Pardeshi (IAS)
- Amit Khatavkar (IRS)
- Ganesh Tengale (IRS)
- Bhaskar Sawant (IAS)
- Ashwini Bhide (IAS)

== Geographical indication ==
Sangli turmeric was awarded the Geographical Indication (GI) status tag from the Geographical Indications Registry under the Union Government of India on 7 November 2018 (valid until 25 April 2024).

Sangli Turmeric Cluster Pvt Ltd, from Sangli, proposed the GI registration of Sangli turmeric. After filing the application in August 2014, the Turmeric was granted the GI tag in 2018 by the Geographical Indication Registry in Chennai, making the name "Sangli turmeric" exclusive to the Turmeric grown in the region. It thus became the second turmeric variety from Maharashtra after Waigaon Turmeric and the 32nd type of goods from Maharashtra to earn the GI tag.

== See also ==
- Bilashi
- Kadegaon
- Madhavnagar
- Miraj
- Palus
- Shirala
- Tasgaon
