= Sangli constituency =

Sangli constituency may refer to:

- Sangli (Lok Sabha constituency) of the Indian parliament
- Sangli (Vidhan Sabha constituency) of the Maharashtra state parliament
