= Prithviraj Deshmukh =

Indian politician

Member of Maharashtra Legislative Council
- In office 29 May 2019 – 24 April 2020
- Preceded by: Shivajirao Deshmukh
- Succeeded by: Gopichand Padalkar
- Constituency: elected by Legislative Assembly Members

Member of Maharashtra Legislative Assembly
- In office 1996–1999
- Preceded by: Sampatrao Deshmukh
- Succeeded by: Patangrao Kadam
- Constituency: Bhilwadi Wangi

Personal details
- Born: 5 April 1964 (age 62)
- Party: Bharatiya Janata Party
- Parent: Sayajirao Yadav Deshmukh (father)
- Profession: Politician

Prithviraj Sayajirao Yadav Deshmukh is an Indian politician from Bharatiya Janata Party – Maharashtra. He was elected as the Member of Maharashtra Legislative Council on 29 May 2019 after the post had fallen vacant owing to the death of Congress leader Shivajirao Deshmukh. He had also represented Bhilwadi Wangi in Maharashtra Legislative Assembly from 1996 to 1999.

== Electoral history ==
Year	Constituency	Party	Result	Votes	%	Opponent	Party	Votes	%
1996	Bhilwadi Wangi	Ind	Won	72,526	51.09	Patangrao Kadam	INC	68,146	48.01
1999	Bhilwadi Wangi	NCP	Lost	61,637	43.29	Patangrao Kadam	INC	79,466	55.82
2009	Palus-Kadegaon	Ind	Lost	70,626	38.82	Patangrao Kadam	INC	1,06,211	58.37
2014	Palus-Kadegaon	BJP	Lost	88,848	42.42	Patangrao Kadam	INC	1,12,523	53.95
