= Vikramsinh Balasaheb Sawant =

Indian politician

Vikramsinh Sawant

Member of Maharashtra Legislative Assembly
- In office 2019–2024
- Preceded by: Vilasrao Narayan Jagtap
- Succeeded by: Gopichand Padalkar
- Constituency: Jat

Personal details
- Party: Indian National Congress
- Occupation: Politician

Vikramsinh Balasaheb Sawant is a leader of Indian National Congress and a member of the Maharashtra Legislative Assembly elected from Jat Assembly constituency in Sangli city.

== Positions held ==
- 2019: Elected to Maharashtra Legislative Assembly.
