= Prakash Shendge =

Indian politician

Member of Maharashtra Legislative Assembly
- In office 2009–2014
- Preceded by: Suresh Khade
- Succeeded by: Vilasrao Narayan Jagtap
- Constituency: Jat

Personal details
- Parent: Shivajirao Krishnaji Shendge (father)
- Education: University of Mumbai (M.Com; 1980); New Law College, University of Mumbai (LLB; 1983)
- Website: https://www.prakashshendge.com/

Prakash Shivajirao Shendge is an Indian politician, former member of the Bharatiya Janata Party and founder of the "OBC Bahujan Party" in Maharashtra. He was a member of the Maharashtra Legislative Assembly from 2009 to 2014, elected from Jat in Sangli district.
