= Bhilwadi Wangi Assembly constituency =

Former constituency of the Maharashtra legislative assembly in India

Coordinates: 19.020°N 72.843°E

Bhilwadi Wangi
- Former constituency for the Maharashtra Legislative Assembly

Constituency details
- Country: India
- Region: Western India
- State: Maharashtra
- Lok Sabha constituency: Sangli
- Established: 1978
- Abolished: 2008

Bhilwadi Wangi Vidhan Sabha seat was one of the constituencies of Maharashtra Vidhan Sabha, in India. It was a segment of Sangli Lok Sabha constituency. Bhilwadi Wangi seat existed until the 2004 elections after which it was succeeded by Palus-Kadegaon Assembly constituency seat in 2008.

== Members of Legislative Assembly ==
Year	Member	Party
1978	Sampatrao Annasaheb Chavan Deshmukh	Indian National Congress
1980	Sampatrao Annasaheb Chavan Deshmukh	Indian National Congress (I)
1985	Patangrao Kadam	Independent
1990	Patangrao Kadam	Indian National Congress
1995	Sampatrao Annasaheb Chavan Deshmukh	Independent
1996^	Prithviraj Deshmukh	Independent
1999	Patangrao Kadam	Indian National Congress
2004	Patangrao Kadam	Indian National Congress
2009 onwards : See Palus-Kadegaon

== Election results ==
=== Assembly Election 2004 ===
2004 Maharashtra Legislative Assembly election : Bhilwadi Wangi
Party	Candidate	Votes	%	±%
INC	Dr. Patangrao Shripatrao Kadam	121,941	77.60%	▲21.78
Independent	Dr. Prithviraj Sampatrao Chavan Deshmukh	20,041	12.75%	New
SBP	Chandrakant Pandurang Patil	10,477	6.67%	New
BSP	Lote Gautam Gulab	2,541	1.62%	New
Independent	Shivaji Jagannath Rawal(Vaghale)	2,141	1.36%	New
Margin of victory		101,900	64.85%	▲52.32
Turnout		157,167	75.41%	▼8.62
Total valid votes		157,141		
Registered electors		208,429		▲21.03
INC hold		Swing	▲21.78	

=== Assembly Election 1999 ===
1999 Maharashtra Legislative Assembly election : Bhilwadi Wangi
Party	Candidate	Votes	%	±%
INC	Dr. Patangrao Shripatrao Kadam	79,466	55.82%	▲7.81
NCP	Pruthviraj Sayajirao Deshmukh	61,637	43.29%	New
SS	Jadhav Shankar Dnyandeo	1,264	0.89%	New
Margin of victory		17,829	12.52%	▲9.44
Turnout		144,707	84.03%	▲0.32
Total valid votes		142,367		
Registered electors		172,213		▲1.56
INC gain from Independent		Swing	▲4.72	

=== Assembly By-election 1996 ===
1996 Maharashtra Legislative Assembly by-election : Bhilwadi Wangi
Party	Candidate	Votes	%	±%
Independent	Prithviraj Deshmukh	72,526	51.10%	New
INC	Dr. Patangrao Shripatrao Kadam	68,146	48.01%	▲2.71
Margin of victory		4,380	3.09%	▼2.05
Turnout		143,040	84.36%	▼1.54
Total valid votes		141,937		
Registered electors		169,568		▲2.26
Independent hold		Swing	▲0.66	

=== Assembly Election 1995 ===
1995 Maharashtra Legislative Assembly election : Bhilwadi Wangi
Party	Candidate	Votes	%	±%
Independent	Sampatrao Vyankatrao Chavan Deshmukh	71,296	50.44%	New
INC	Dr. Patangrao Shripatrao Kadam	64,031	45.30%	▼9.88
Independent	Patil Shivaji Sitaram	2,808	1.99%	New
SS	Yadav Suresh Maruti	1,124	0.80%	▼0.84
BSP	Hoval Ashok Vithoba	1,104	0.78%	New
Margin of victory		7,265	5.14%	▼7.60
Turnout		143,307	86.42%	▲10.63
Total valid votes		141,354		
Registered electors		165,820		▲5.57
Independent gain from INC		Swing	▼4.74	

=== Assembly Election 1990 ===
1990 Maharashtra Legislative Assembly election : Bhilwadi Wangi
Party	Candidate	Votes	%	±%
INC	Patangrao Kadam	64,665	55.17%	▲21.77
CPI	Lad Ganpati Dada	49,738	42.44%	New
SS	Yadav Suresh Maruti	1,911	1.63%	New
Margin of victory		14,927	12.74%	▼17.16
Turnout		119,143	75.86%	▼3.36
Total valid votes		117,201		
Registered electors		157,066		▲21.41
INC gain from Independent		Swing	▼8.13	

=== Assembly Election 1985 ===
1985 Maharashtra Legislative Assembly election : Bhilwadi Wangi
Party	Candidate	Votes	%	±%
Independent	Patangrao Kadam	63,865	63.30%	New
INC	Sampatrao Annasaheb Chavan Deshmukh	33,700	33.40%	New
PWPI	Pawar Sampatrao Govindrao	1,876	1.86%	▼6.81
Independent	Baban Alias Shripati Baburao Aute	1,146	1.14%	New
Margin of victory		30,165	29.90%	▲29.79
Turnout		102,188	78.99%	▲10.75
Total valid votes		100,886		
Registered electors		129,370		▲10.79
Independent gain from INC(I)		Swing	▲20.67	

=== Assembly Election 1980 ===
1980 Maharashtra Legislative Assembly election : Bhilwadi Wangi
Party	Candidate	Votes	%	±%
INC(I)	Sampatrao Annasaheb Chavan	33,476	42.64%	New
Independent	Patangrao Kadam	33,390	42.53%	New
PWPI	Patil Bhimrao Ramchandra	6,809	8.67%	▼16.68
INC(U)	Nikam Shankarrao Keshavrao	4,836	6.16%	New
Margin of victory		86	0.11%	▼26.72
Turnout		80,182	68.67%	▼10.15
Total valid votes		78,511		
Registered electors		116,768		▲8.61
INC(I) gain from INC		Swing	▼9.55	

=== Assembly Election 1978 ===
1978 Maharashtra Legislative Assembly election : Bhilwadi Wangi
Party	Candidate	Votes	%	±%
INC	Sampatrao Annasaheb Chavan	43,419	52.19%	New
PWPI	Lad Ganpati Dada	21,097	25.36%	New
JP	Yadav Lalasaheb Bhanudas	17,494	21.03%	New
Independent	Swant Keshav Maruti	1,192	1.43%	New
Margin of victory		22,322	26.83%	
Turnout		85,012	79.07%	
Total valid votes		83,202		
Registered electors		107,511		
INC win (new seat)				

== See also ==
- List of constituencies of Maharashtra Legislative Assembly
