= Sangli Lok Sabha constituency =

Lok Sabha constituency in Maharashtra

Coordinates: 16.8°N 74.6°E

Sangli
- Lok Sabha constituency
- Sangli Lok Sabha Constituency map

Constituency details
- Country: India
- Region: Western India
- State: Maharashtra
- Assembly constituencies: Miraj; Sangli; Palus-Kadegaon; Khanapur; Tasgaon-Kavathe Mahankal; Jat
- Established: 1952
- Reservation: None

Member of Parliament
- 18th Lok Sabha
- Incumbent Vishal Patil
- Party: IND
- Alliance: INDIA
- Elected year: 2024

Sangli Lok Sabha constituency is one of the 48 Lok Sabha (parliamentary) constituencies in Maharashtra state in western India.

== Assembly segments ==
Presently, Sangli Lok Sabha constituency comprises six Vidhan Sabha (legislative assembly) segments. These segments (along with their constituency number and reservation status) are:

#	Name	District	Member	Party	Leading (in 2024)
281	Miraj (SC)	Sangli	Suresh Khade	BJP	IND
282	Sangli	Sangli	Sudhir Gadgil	BJP	IND
285	Palus-Kadegaon	Sangli	Vishwajeet Kadam	INC	IND
286	Khanapur	Sangli	Suhas Babar	SHS	IND
287	Tasgaon-Kavathe Mahankal	Sangli	Rohit Patil	NCP-SP	IND
288	Jat	Sangli	Gopichand Padalkar	BJP	BJP

== Members of Parliament ==
Year	Name	Party
1952-57 : Does not exist
1957	Balwant Patil (Note: Miraj Lok Sabha constituency)	Peasants and Workers Party
1962	Vijayasinhrao Dafle (Note: Miraj Lok Sabha constituency)	Indian National Congress
1967	S D Patil	Indian National Congress
1971	Ganapati Gotkhinde	Indian National Congress
1977	Ganapati Gotkhinde	Indian National Congress
1980	Vasantdada Patil	Indian National Congress
1983^	Shalini Patil	Indian National Congress
1984	Prakashbapu Patil	Indian National Congress
1989	Prakashbapu Patil	Indian National Congress
1991	Prakashbapu Patil	Indian National Congress
1996	Madan Patil	Indian National Congress
1998	Madan Patil	Indian National Congress
1999	Prakashbapu Patil	Indian National Congress
2004	Prakashbapu Patil	Indian National Congress
2006^	Pratik Patil	Indian National Congress
2009	Pratik Patil	Indian National Congress
2014	Sanjaykaka Patil	Bharatiya Janata Party
2019	Sanjaykaka Patil	Bharatiya Janata Party
2024	Vishal Patil	Independent

== Election results ==
=== 2024 ===
2024 Indian general elections: Sangli
Party	Candidate	Votes	%	±%
IND	Vishal Prakashbapu Patil	5,71,666	48.91	▲19.95
BJP	Sanjaykaka Patil	4,71,613	40.35	▼2.42
SS(UBT)	Chandrahar Subhash Patil	60,860	5.21	New
Independent	Allauddin Hayatchand Kazi	9,282	0.79	New
NOTA	None of the Above	6,565	0.56	N/A
Majority		1,00,053	8.56	▼5.25
Turnout		11,69,320	62.39	▼3.53
Independent gain from BJP		Swing		

=== 2019 ===
2019 Indian general elections: Sangli
Party	Candidate	Votes	%	±%
BJP	Sanjaykaka Patil	508,995	42.77	−15.66
SWP	Vishal Prakashbapu Patil	3,44,643	28.96	+28.96
VBA	Gopichand Padalkar	3,00,234	25.23	+25.23
NOTA	None of the Above	6,585	0.55	N/A
Majority		1,64,352	13.81	−9.05
Turnout		11,92,571	65.92	+2.40
BJP hold		Swing		

=== General elections 2014 ===
2014 Indian general elections: Sangli
Party	Candidate	Votes	%	±%
BJP	Sanjaykaka Patil	611,563	58.43	+58.43
INC	Pratik Prakashbapu Patil	3,72,271	35.57	−13.17
BSP	Bandgar Nanaso Balaso	11,378	1.09	−0.43
AAP	Sameena Abdulmajid Khan	4,699	0.45	New
Majority		2,39,292	22.86	+17.74
Turnout		10,47,510	63.52	+11.40
BJP gain from INC		Swing		

=== General elections 2009 ===
2009 Indian general elections: Sangli
Party	Candidate	Votes	%	±%
INC	Pratik Prakashbapu Patil	378,620	48.74	
Independent	Ajitrao Shankarrao Ghorpade	3,38,837	43.62	
BSP	M. Javed Patel	11,793	1.52	
Majority		39,783	5.12	
Turnout		7,76,830	52.12	
INC gain from Independent		Swing	+ 2.6	

== See also ==
- Sangli district
- List of constituencies of the Lok Sabha
