= Shalini Patil =

Indian politician (1931–2025)

Member of Parliament, Lok Sabha
- In office 1983 — 1984
- Preceded by: Vasantdada Patil
- Succeeded by: Prakashbapu Vasantdada Patil
- Constituency: Sangli

Member of Maharashtra Legislative Assembly
- In office 1999 — 2009
- Preceded by: Shankarrao Jagtap
- Succeeded by: Shashikant Shinde
- Constituency: Koregaon
- In office 1980 — 1983
- Preceded by: Vasantdada Patil
- Succeeded by: Vasantdada Patil
- Constituency: Sangli

Personal details
- Born: 26 June 1931
- Died: 20 December 2025 (aged 94) Mumbai, Maharashtra, India
- Party: INC
- Spouse(s): Shyamrao Jadhav (till 1964); Vasantdada Patil
- Children: 4

Shalini Patil (born Shalini Phalke, later Shalini Jadhav; 26 June 1931 – 20 December 2025) was an Indian politician who held ministerial positions in the Congress party governments of Maharashtra during the 1980s. Patil was married to Maharashtra Chief Minister, Vasantdada Patil.

== Early and personal life ==
Shalinitai was born on 26 June 1931 as Shalini Phalke, into a relatively poor family. Her father not only ensured that she received a good education, despite financial constraints, but also that she married a man who would permit her to continue her education after marriage. At a young age, Shalini was married to Shyamrao Jadhav, a gentleman belonging to her own community and similar background, in a match arranged by their families in the usual Indian way. Her education continued with the full support of her husband: Shalini Jadhav earned a degree in law and was called to the Bar. She had four children with Shyamrao Jadhav and discharged her family responsibilities with the help of her husband and his near relatives, while pursuing first her education and then her political career.

Jadhav entered politics when her children were still very young. Her first public position was as a member on Satara Zilla Parishad (County Council). Later, she was appointed president of the women's wing of the MPCC (Maharashtra Pradesh Congress Committee). It was as a worker of the Congress party that she came in contact with Vasantdada Patil, her future second husband.

Shyamrao Jadhav died in 1964, and shortly after his death, Shalini married Marathi politician Vasantdada Patil. She was in her mid-30s at this time, with four small children. Vasantdada, who was fourteen years older than Shalinitai, was a widower with a grown-up son. No children were born of the second marriage.

== Political career ==
Patil held ministerial positions in the Congress party Governments of Maharashtra during the 1980s. In 1981, she was instrumental in getting the then chief minister A. R. Antulay to resign. Shalinitai became active in Maharashtra politics after marrying Vasantdada Patil. Later she represented Sangli constituency in the Indian parliament (Lok Sabha) during a period in the 1980s. She represented the constituency of Koregaon, Satara in the Maharashtra state legislative assembly, the (Vidhan Sabha) from 1999 to 2009. Prior to that she unsuccessfully contested the seat in 1990 and 1995 for the Janata Dal and as an independent, respectively.

During the 1970s, she founded a charity called Rajmata Jijau Pratishthan to raise funds for hospitals for the poor and women-related activities. The charity was in the news for the controversial granting of or purchase of land by the government for the charity. Mrs. Patil was well known for speaking her mind, particularly about rights for the Maratha community. During her career, she has campaigned for more seats for women in elected bodies. She has also criticized the Indian Central Government's move to extend 27.5 per cent reservation to OBCs in the central academic institutes such as IITs and IIMs. Since her then party, the Nationalist Congress Party led by Sharad Pawar supported this policy, Shalinitai was expelled from that party in 2006. In 2009, she launched a new party called Krantisena Maharashtra. The party attracted scant support and soon Shalinitai joined the Congress party.

== Death ==
Patil died in Mumbai on 20 December 2025 at the age of 94.
