= Gopichand Padalkar =

Indian politician

Member of Maharashtra Legislative Assembly
- Incumbent
- Assumed office 23 November 2024
- Preceded by: Vikramsinh Sawant
- Constituency: Jat

Member of Maharashtra Legislative Council
- In office 14 May 2020 – 23 November 2024
- Succeeded by: Dadarao Keche
- Constituency: Elected by MLAs

Personal details
- Born: Gopichand Kundalik Padalkar; 1 October 1982 (age 44) Pimpri, Atpadi, Sangli, Maharashtra
- Party: Bharatiya Janata Party (2019-Present) (2014-2019)
- Other political affiliations: Rashtriya Samaj Paksha (Before 2014); Vanchit Bahujan Aaghadi (2019-2019)

Gopichand Kundalik Padalkar (born 1 October 1982) is an Indian politician. He is a member of the Bharatiya Janata Party. He is a member of 2024 Maharashtra Legislative Assembly from Jath constituency. He previously got elected to the Legislative Council (unopposed) on 14 May 2020. He started his political career with the Rashtriya Samaj Paksha, fought first MLA election from BJP in 2014. He rejoined BJP before the 2019 Maharashtra Legislative Elections. He is also a film maker and an actor. He is BJP spokesperson and a firebrand Hindu OBC leader.

== Early life ==
He was born to Kundlik and Hirabai Padalkar of Padalkarwadi, Sangli district. His father Kundlik Padalkar was a primary teacher. Gopichand Padalkar belongs to Dhangar community from Maharashtra, He is a Higher Secondary School graduate.

== Career ==
He started his political career with the Rashtriya Samaj Paksha of Mahadev Jankar. He has unsuccessfully contested elections for District council once, Vidhan Sabha thrice and Lok Sabha once, before his election to the Maharashtra Legislative Council.

In 2014 he joined Bhartiya Janata Party and contested 2014 assembly election from Atpadi-Khanapur constituency, subsequently he left the party and he joined Vanchit Bahujan Aghadi contesting Sangli Lok Sabha seat in the summer of 2019. As a losing candidate he gave a tough fight securing over three hundred thousand votes, after his loss he rejoined BJP in October 2019 and contested Vidhan Sabha elections from Baramati against Ajit Pawar.

He got elected to the Legislative Council by MLA's (unopposed) on 14 May 2020, along with 9 others.

== Positions held ==
- Member of Maharashtra Legislative Council 14 May 2020.
- Spokesperson of BJP, Maharashtra
- Vice President Of BJP, MAHARASHTRA 2026

== Electoral record ==
Year	Constituency	Party	Result	Votes	%	Opponent	Party	Votes	%
2024	Jat	BJP	Won	113,737	53.39	Vikramsinh Sawant	INC	75,497	35.44
2019	Baramati	BJP	Lost	30,376	12.92	Ajit Pawar	NCP	195,641	83.24
2019	Sangli	VBA	Lost	300,234	25.23	Sanjaykaka Patil	BJP	508,995	42.77
2014	Khanapur	BJP	Lost	44,419	20.38	Anil Babar	SS	72,849	33.43
2009	Khanapur	RSPS	Lost	19,024	10.34	Sadashivrao Hanmantrao Patil	INC	77,965	42.55
