= Pratik Prakashbapu Patil =

Indian politician

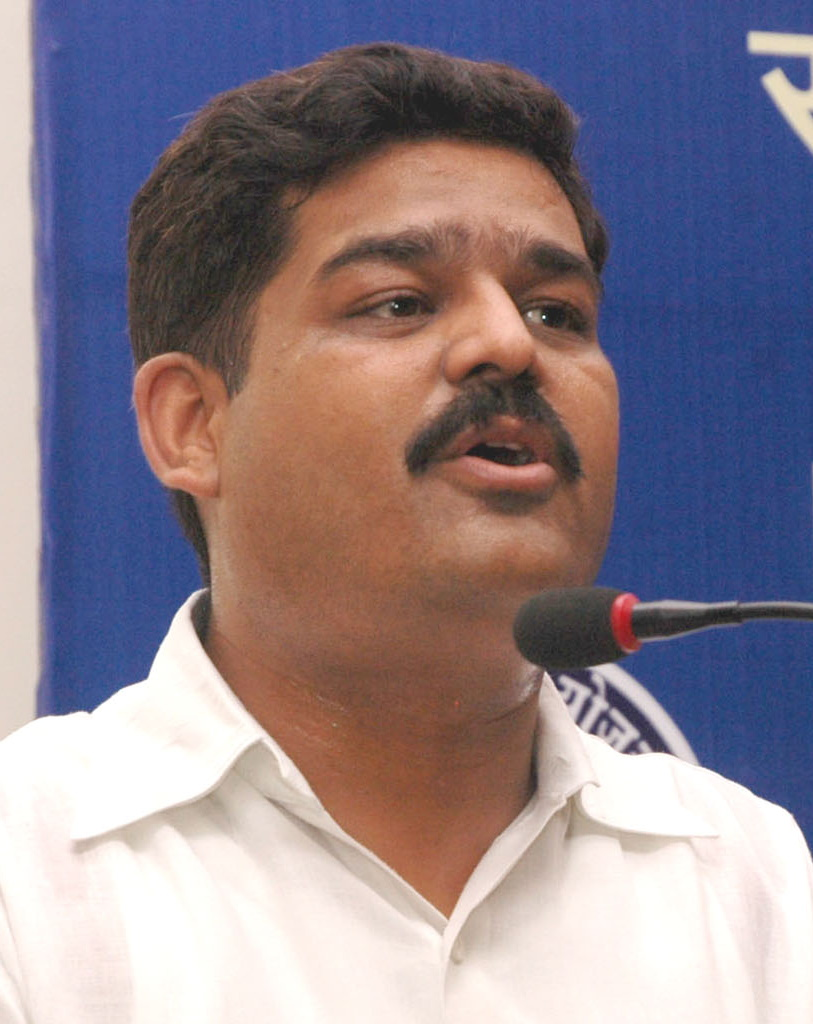
- Patil in 2009

Minister of State for Coal
- In office 19 Jan 2011 – Oct. 2012

Ministry of Youth Affairs and Sports
- In office 14 June 2009 – 19 Jan 2011

Ministry of Heavy Industries and Public Enterprises
- In office 31 May 2009 – 14 June 2009

Member of Parliament, Lok Sabha
- In office 11 May 2006 — 16 May 2014
- Preceded by: Prakashbapu Vasantdada Patil
- Succeeded by: Sanjaykaka Patil
- Constituency: Sangli (Lok Sabha constituency)

Personal details
- Born: 8 September 1973 (age 52) Kolhapur, Maharashtra, India
- Party: Indian National Congress
- Spouse: Mrs. Aishwarya
- Children: 2
- Parents: Prakashbapu Vasantdada Patil (father); Shailaja Patil (mother)
- Relatives: Vasantdada Patil (Grandfather) Vishal Patil (Brother)
- Website: pratikpatil.com

Pratik Prakashbapu Patil (born 8 September 1973) is an Indian member of the 15th Lok Sabha of India. He is son of former Loksabha member Prakashbapu Vasantdada Patil and also grandson of former chief minister of Maharashtra Vasantdada Patil.

He represented the Sangli constituency of Maharashtra and is a member of the Indian National Congress (INC) political party.

He held a position in the Indian Union Government as the Union Minister of State for Coal.

He was Minister of State for Heavy Industries and Public Enterprises in the Manmohan Singh Cabinet in UPA II when Vilasrao Deshmukh was the Cabinet Minister for Heavy Industries and Public Enterprises.

He was the Minister of State for Youth Affairs and Sports in the Manmohan Singh Cabinet in UPA II when Ajay Maken was heading the ministry.

He was also a member of the 14th Lok Sabha from Sangli, Maharashtra after he won the bypoll held due to death of his father, Prakashbapu Vasantdada Patil.

In 2019 he resigned from the Indian National Congress Party and declared that he is quitting politics. He further concentrated on social activities under the organisation in name of his grandfather Vasantdada Patil. He also declared that from then onwards his younger brother Vishal Patil would represent the Vasantdada Patil family in politics. Since 2019 he took a backstage giving the torch to his younger brother, who contested the Sangli Lok Sabha Constituency elections in 2019.

In 2024 when the Lok Sabha seat of Sangli went to Shiv Sena UBT in the Maha Vikas Aghadi, Vishal Patil was forced to contest as Independent candidate and he was the one who took the elections in his hands and helped Vishal Patil gain support of VBA chief Prakash Ambedkar and other leaders within the district across parties.
