= Vishal Patil =

Indian politician

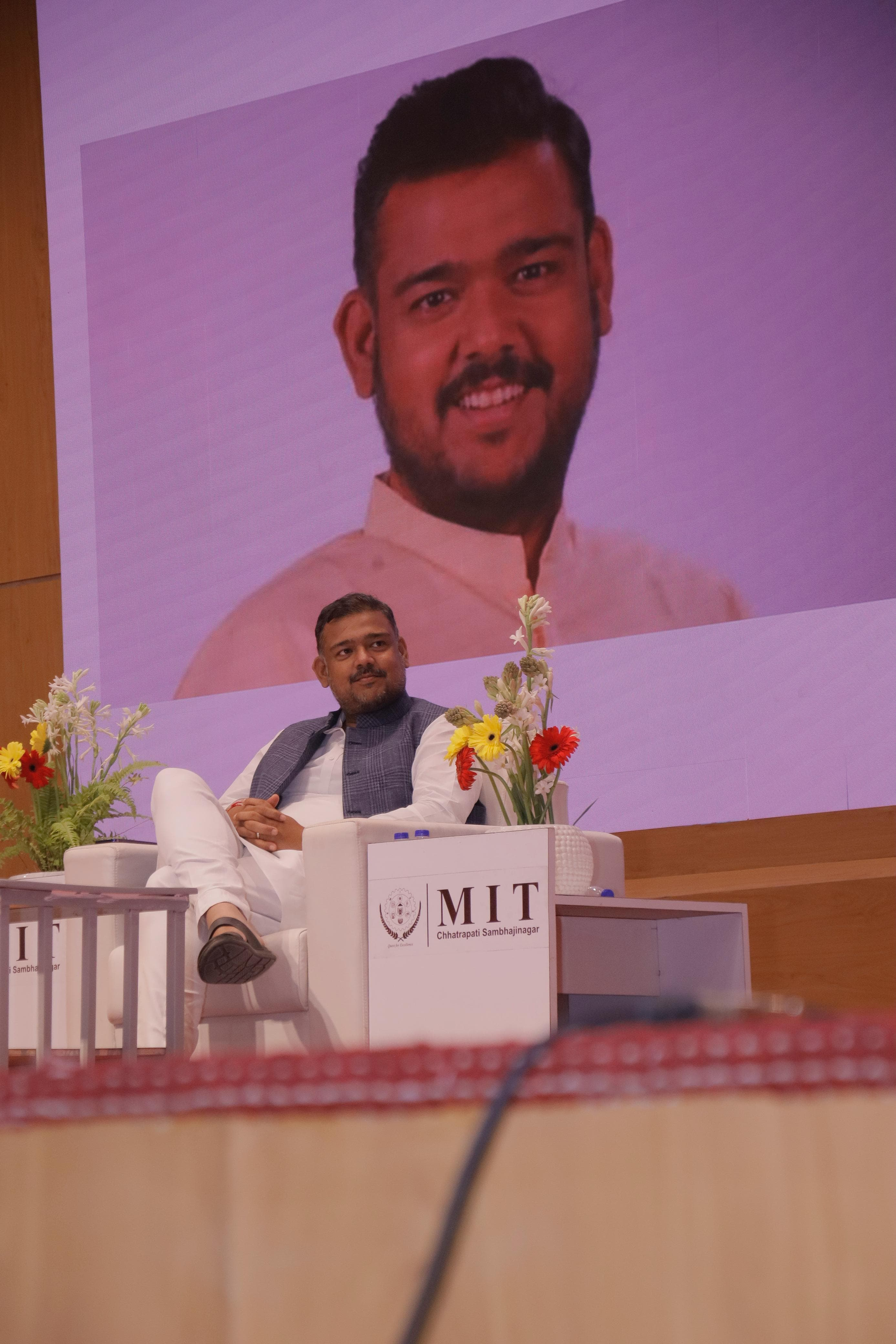

Member of Parliament, Lok Sabha
- Incumbent
- Assumed office 4 June 2024
- Preceded by: Sanjaykaka Patil
- Constituency: Sangli

Personal details
- Born: Vishal Prakashbapu Patil
- Party: Indian National Congress
- Other political affiliations: Swabhimani Shetkari Sanghatana (SWP) (2019-2020)
- Spouse: Pooja Vishal Patil
- Children: 2
- Parent: Prakashbapu Vasantdada Patil (father)
- Relatives: Vasantdada Patil (grandfather); Pratik Prakashbapu Patil (brother)
- Occupation: Politician
- Website: official Website

Vishal Prakashbapu Patil is an Indian politician and Lok Sabha MP representing Sangli since 2024. He is a member of the Indian National Congress and was elected as an Independent from Sangli.

== Personal life ==
Patil is the grandson of former Chief Minister Vasantdada Patil. He is the son of former MP Prakashbapu Vasantdada Patil and Mahila Pradesh Congress leader Shailja Patil, while former Union Minister of State for Coal Pratik Prakashbapu Patil is his elder brother. His wife's name is Pooja, and he has two daughters, Ehita and Aritra.

== Career ==
In 2019, Patil contested in the Sangli Lok Sabha constituency under the Swabhimani Paksha party banner. However, he lost against Bharatiya Janata Party's Sanjaykaka Patil by a margin of 164,352 votes.

=== 2024 Lok Sabha Election and Independent Victory ===
In 2024, Patil ran as an independent candidate after the Indian National Congress party could not reach an agreement with its ally in the Sangli constituency, Shiv Sena (UBT), to have him run under their ticket as they had fielded wrestler Chandrahar Patil. Vishal Patil won the election and was elected to the Parliament of India. Vishal Patil extended his support to the INDIA coalition more specifically the Indian National Congress and thus claims to be the 100th Member of Parliament of the Indian National Congress.

== See also ==
- 18th Lok Sabha
- Indian National Congress
