= Jat Assembly constituency =

Constituency of the Maharashtra legislative assembly in India

Coordinates: 17.08°N 75.23°E

Jat
- Constituency No. 288 for the Maharashtra Legislative Assembly

Constituency details
- Country: India
- Region: Western India
- State: Maharashtra
- District: Sangli
- Lok Sabha constituency: Sangli
- Established: 1951
- Total electors: 292,456
- Reservation: None

Member of Legislative Assembly
- 15th Maharashtra Legislative Assembly
- Incumbent Gopichand Padalkar
- Party: Bharatiya Janata Party
- Elected year: 2024

Jat Assembly constituency (formerly Jath) is one of the 288 Vidhan Sabha (legislative assembly) constituencies of Maharashtra state in western India.

== Overview ==
Jat constituency is one of the eight Vidhan Sabha constituencies located in the Sangli district.

Jat is part of the Sangli Lok Sabha constituency along with five other Vidhan Sabha segments in this district, namely Miraj, Sangli, Palus-Kadegaon, Tasgao-Kavathemahakal and Khanapur.

== Members of the Legislative Assembly ==
Election	Member	Party
1952	Dafale Vijaysinhrao Ramrao	Independent politician
1957	Dafale Vijaysinhrao Ramrao	Independent politician
1962	Tukaram Krishnarao Shendge	Indian National Congress
1967	Shivrudra T. Bamane	Indian National Congress
1972	Shivrudra T. Bamane	Indian National Congress
1978	Sohani Jayant Ishawar	Indian National Congress
1980	Sohani Jayant Ishawar	Indian National Congress (I)
1985	Sanamadikar Umaji Dhanappa	Indian National Congress
1990	Sanamadikar Umaji Dhanappa	Independent politician
1995	Kamble Madhukar Shankar	Independent politician
1999	Sanamadikar Umaji Dhannapa	Indian National Congress
2004	Sureshbhau Dagadu Khade	Bharatiya Janata Party
2009	Prakash Shendge	Bharatiya Janata Party
2014	Vilasrao Narayan Jagtap	Bharatiya Janata Party
2019	Vikramsinh Balasaheb Sawant	Indian National Congress
2024	Gopichand Padalkar	Bharatiya Janata Party

== Election results ==
=== Assembly Election 2024 ===
2024 Maharashtra Legislative Assembly election : Jat
Party	Candidate	Votes	%	±%
BJP	Gopichand Padalkar	113,737	53.64	▲23.52
INC	Vikramsinh Balasaheb Sawant	75,497	35.61	▼14.40
Independent	Tammangouda Ishwarappa Ravi-Patil	19,426	9.16	New
BSP	Vikram Dadaso Dhone	1,514	0.71	▼0.16
NOTA	None of the above	1,019	0.48	▼0.14
Margin of victory		38,240	18.04	▼1.85
Turnout		213,041	72.85	▲8.33
Total valid votes		212,022		
Registered electors		292,456		▲7.38
BJP gain from INC		Swing	▲3.63	

=== Assembly Election 2019 ===
2019 Maharashtra Legislative Assembly election : Jat
Party	Candidate	Votes	%	±%
INC	Vikramsinh Balasaheb Sawant	87,184	50.01	▲17.18
BJP	Vilasrao Narayan Jagtap	52,510	30.12	▼13.23
Independent	Dr. Ravindra Shivshankar Arali	28,715	16.47	New
Independent	Vikram Dadaso Dhone	1,830	1.05	New
Baliraja Party	Anand Shankar Nalage - Patil	1,546	0.89	New
BSP	Mahadev Harishchandra Kamble	1,521	0.87	▼0.57
NOTA	None of the above	1,086	0.62	▲0.03
Margin of victory		34,674	19.89	▲9.36
Turnout		175,724	64.52	▼3.37
Total valid votes		174,339		
Registered electors		272,345		▲9.25
INC gain from BJP		Swing	▲6.66	

=== Assembly Election 2014 ===
2014 Maharashtra Legislative Assembly election : Jat
Party	Candidate	Votes	%	±%
BJP	Vilasrao Narayan Jagtap	72,885	43.35	▲3.86
INC	Vikramsinh Balasaheb Sawant	55,187	32.83	New
NCP	Prakash (Aanna) Shivajirao Shendage	30,130	17.92	▼18.41
BSP	Jakapa Daryappa Saraje	2,414	1.44	▲0.07
SS	Sangamesh Mallappa Teli	1,928	1.15	New
MNS	Bhausaheb Pandurang Kolekar	1,839	1.09	New
Independent	Sunil Sidu Dalawai	1,399	0.83	New
NOTA	None of the above	998	0.59	New
Margin of victory		17,698	10.53	▲7.37
Turnout		169,238	67.89	▲1.89
Total valid votes		168,120		
Registered electors		249,286		▲11.39
BJP hold		Swing	▲3.86	

=== Assembly Election 2009 ===
2009 Maharashtra Legislative Assembly election : Jat
Party	Candidate	Votes	%	±%
BJP	Prakash Shendge	58,320	39.49	▼6.62
NCP	Vilasrao Narayan Jagtap	53,653	36.33	New
JSS	Patil Basavraj Sidgonda	26,406	17.88	▼0.80
BSP	Atul Girmal Kamble	2,030	1.37	▼0.02
Independent	Tatyasaheb Jaganath Patil	1,974	1.34	New
Independent	Shahaji Mhalappa Shingade	1,386	0.94	New
Margin of victory		4,667	3.16	▼15.45
Turnout		147,697	66.00	▼0.69
Total valid votes		147,697		
Registered electors		223,786		▲8.92
BJP hold		Swing	▼6.62	

=== Assembly Election 2004 ===
2004 Maharashtra Legislative Assembly election : Jat
Party	Candidate	Votes	%	±%
BJP	Sureshbhau Dagadu Khade	63,059	46.11	▲27.97
INC	Sanamadikar Umaji Dhanappa	37,610	27.50	▼20.85
JSS	Sanamadikar Prabhakar	25,541	18.68	New
RSPS	Kamble Sanjay Daryappa	4,147	3.03	New
Independent	Waghmare Avinash Babu	3,274	2.39	New
BSP	Mane Shravan Chandru	1,897	1.39	New
Independent	Bhauso Malkappa Waghmare	1,232	0.90	New
Margin of victory		25,449	18.61	▼4.77
Turnout		137,021	66.69	▼0.25
Total valid votes		136,760		
Registered electors		205,467		▲22.24
BJP gain from INC		Swing	▼2.24	

=== Assembly Election 1999 ===
1999 Maharashtra Legislative Assembly election : Jat
Party	Candidate	Votes	%	±%
INC	Sanamadikar Umaji Dhannapa	51,118	48.35	▲14.10
NCP	Vhankhande Sitaram Basappa	26,402	24.97	New
BJP	Kamble Madhukar Shankar	19,177	18.14	New
Independent	Khade Suresh (Bhau) Dagadu	8,056	7.62	New
Margin of victory		24,716	23.38	▲8.87
Turnout		112,508	66.94	▼3.03
Total valid votes		105,721		
Registered electors		168,079		▲2.64
INC gain from Independent		Swing	▼0.41	

=== Assembly Election 1995 ===
1995 Maharashtra Legislative Assembly election : Jat
Party	Candidate	Votes	%	±%
Independent	Kamble Madhukar Shankar	54,294	48.76	New
INC	Sanmadikar Umaji Dhanapa	38,135	34.25	New
JD	Dhabade Jayashri Vijay	10,935	9.82	▼1.71
SS	Gulave Bharat Eknath	5,594	5.02	▼19.41
Independent	Sadamate Sunil Shivaji	929	0.83	New
BBM	Kamble Alias Huparikar Sudhir Sitaram	872	0.78	New
Margin of victory		16,159	14.51	▼10.04
Turnout		114,576	69.97	▲12.58
Total valid votes		111,340		
Registered electors		163,752		▲9.67
Independent hold		Swing	▼0.22	

=== Assembly Election 1990 ===
1990 Maharashtra Legislative Assembly election : Jat
Party	Candidate	Votes	%	±%
Independent	Umaji Dhanappa Sanamadikar	41,054	48.98	New
SS	Anandrao Vithoba Adsul	20,479	24.43	New
JD	Sadashiv Nagapa Chalwadi	9,668	11.53	New
Independent	Sale Nitia Rajaram	7,053	8.41	New
Independent	Kamble Vivek Apa	4,729	5.64	New
Independent	Sabale Mohan Pandurang	713	0.85	New
Margin of victory		20,575	24.55	▼41.38
Turnout		85,688	57.39	▲22.98
Total valid votes		83,825		
Registered electors		149,308		▲19.18
Independent gain from INC		Swing	▼33.98	

=== Assembly Election 1985 ===
1985 Maharashtra Legislative Assembly election : Jat
Party	Candidate	Votes	%	±%
INC	Sanamadikar Umaji Dhanappa	34,992	82.96	New
PWPI	Shivasharan Dnyanu Kalu	7,186	17.04	New
Margin of victory		27,806	65.93	▲29.37
Turnout		43,102	34.41	▼6.55
Total valid votes		42,178		
Registered electors		125,278		▲10.65
INC gain from INC(I)		Swing	▲18.38	

=== Assembly Election 1980 ===
1980 Maharashtra Legislative Assembly election : Jat
Party	Candidate	Votes	%	±%
INC(I)	Sohani Jayant Ishawar	29,036	64.58	▲40.48
JP	Waghamode Shankar Yamanappa	12,600	28.02	New
RPI	Gondhale Parisa Joti	1,220	2.71	New
INC(U)	Torana Digambar Nana	1,064	2.37	New
Independent	Sale Subhash Sidram	778	1.73	New
Margin of victory		16,436	36.56	▲28.21
Turnout		46,375	40.96	▼11.42
Total valid votes		44,961		
Registered electors		113,224		▲7.72
INC(I) gain from INC		Swing	▲23.39	

=== Assembly Election 1978 ===
1978 Maharashtra Legislative Assembly election : Jat
Party	Candidate	Votes	%	±%
INC	Sohani Jayant Ishawar	22,040	41.19	▼47.33
Independent	Sankpal Dilip Pandurang	17,570	32.83	New
INC(I)	Bamane Shivarudra Thabajirao	12,896	24.10	New
RPI(K)	Kamble Dnyanu Kalu	1,005	1.88	New
Margin of victory		4,470	8.35	▼72.84
Turnout		55,050	52.38	▲9.94
Total valid votes		53,511		
Registered electors		105,107		▼1.81
INC hold		Swing	▼47.33	

=== Assembly Election 1972 ===
1972 Maharashtra Legislative Assembly election : Jat
Party	Candidate	Votes	%	±%
INC	Shivrudra T. Bamane	39,096	88.52	▲25.70
RPI	Kamble Anna Krashna	3,240	7.34	▲4.67
ABJS	Ambavade Vishnu Hari	1,828	4.14	▲3.03
Margin of victory		35,856	81.19	▲50.87
Turnout		45,427	42.44	▼10.69
Total valid votes		44,164		
Registered electors		107,049		▲20.07
INC hold		Swing	▲25.70	

=== Assembly Election 1967 ===
1967 Maharashtra Legislative Assembly election : Jat
Party	Candidate	Votes	%	±%
INC	Shivrudra T. Bamane	28,023	62.82	▼4.74
Independent	B. L. Pawar	14,497	32.50	New
RPI	R. C. Kamble	1,191	2.67	New
ABJS	L. D. Sathe	496	1.11	New
Independent	C. S. Kamble	399	0.89	New
Margin of victory		13,526	30.32	▼14.08
Turnout		47,366	53.13	▼0.28
Total valid votes		44,606		
Registered electors		89,157		▲5.11
INC hold		Swing	▼4.74	

=== Assembly Election 1962 ===
1962 Maharashtra Legislative Assembly election : Jat
Party	Candidate	Votes	%	±%
INC	Tukaram Krishnarao Shendge	28,765	67.56	▲37.97
PWPI	Shivaji Ramachandra Shedbale	9,861	23.16	New
ABJS	Balkrishna Keshav Deshpande	2,133	5.01	New
Independent	Bhimashankar Sidarampa Kannure	1,817	4.27	New
Margin of victory		18,904	44.40	▲6.80
Turnout		45,306	53.41	▼7.28
Total valid votes		42,576		
Registered electors		84,822		▲24.04
INC gain from Independent		Swing	▲0.37	

=== Assembly Election 1957 ===
1957 Bombay State Legislative Assembly election : Jat
Party	Candidate	Votes	%	±%
Independent	Dafale Vijaysinhrao Ramrao	27,885	67.19	New
INC	Kalantre Shrimati Charudatta	12,280	29.59	▲10.86
Independent	Arali Bapu Yogappa	1,336	3.22	New
Margin of victory		15,605	37.60	▼14.94
Turnout		41,501	60.69	▼4.48
Total valid votes		41,501		
Registered electors		68,385		▲32.22
Independent hold		Swing	▼4.08	

=== Assembly Election 1952 ===
1952 Bombay State Legislative Assembly election : Jat
Party	Candidate	Votes	%	±%
Independent	Dafale Vijaysinhrao Ramrao	24,021	71.27	New
INC	Mogali Girmallapapa Kasappa	6,314	18.73	New
Independent	Angadi Virupaksana Guru Bassappa	1,768	5.25	New
PWPI	Galitkar Raghunath Namdeo	1,601	4.75	New
Margin of victory		17,707	52.54	
Turnout		33,704	65.17	
Total valid votes		33,704		
Registered electors		51,720		
Independent win (new seat)				

== See also ==
- List of constituencies of Maharashtra Vidhan Sabha
