= G. R. Khairnar =

Government Officer State of Maharashtra

G R Khairnar
- Born: 14 April 1942 (age 83); Pimpalgaon (w), Nasik, Maharashtra, India
- Occupations: ex-Deputy Commissioner, Brihanmumbai Municipal Corporation
- Children: 2

Govind Ragho Khairnar is a former civil servant in Mumbai's Brihanmumbai Municipal Corporation who rose from the rank of Clerk to Deputy Commissioner. He was known for his uprightness and fearlessness while carrying out his duties in the face of political opposition. He was brought to trial for supposed insubordination and heavy-handedness but was cleared of these charges. He is still hailed as a hero of the middle-class Indian.

== Early life ==
He was born in the family of a farmer on 14 April 1942, in the village named Pimpalgaon (wakhari) taluka Deola district Nashik. He had twin elder brothers who tended to the family farming while his father became a middle man for local produce. Khairnar graduated from Bhikusa Yamasa Kshatriya College of Commerce, Nasik, Maharashtra studying in Marathi medium. He graduated with honours and was awarded "ideal student" award from the college. While at the college he also participated in National Cadet Corps.

== Career ==
In 1964 he joined the state services in Maharashtra as Upper Division Clerk.

=== With BMC ===
In 1974, he joined the Brihanmumbai Municipal Corporation BMC) as accounts officer. In 1985, as a ward officer he took on then chief minister Vasantdada Patil when he demolished "Step In", a hotel run by the CM's son Chandrakant. In 1988, he became a Deputy Commissioner in BMC. In 1993, he took on the then Chief Minister Sharad Pawar calling him corrupt and unethical.

In 1994, he was suspended after an inquiry committee headed by a High Court judge found him guilty of various charges including overstepping of authority and specifically of making "willful mistatements". In 1995, the Bhartiya Janta Party and Shiv-Sena combined to take up Khairnar's cause in the run up to elections and managed to wipe out the Congress. While the suspension was being contested in court, Khairnar was variously harassed; he was even asked to vacate his house of 15 years to make way for a swimming pool superintendent. Eventually, the High Court passed judgement ordering the reinstation of Khairnar, but the new government refused to comply. In 1995, he joined hands with Anna Hazare to fight for his cause. In 1997, he won a case against BMC alleging that he had been unjustly suspended due to political pressure. Despite this he was not fully awarded the court's mandate until 2000 when he was reinstated as the Deputy Commissioner.

From 2000 to 2002, Khairnar once again lived up to the title of "One Man Demolition Army" by fighting back land mafias and clearing public land of encroachments, even suffering injuries in doing so. In 2002, the then Municipal Commissioner V. Ranganathan did not extend the retirement age of Khairnar and he had to retire. The popular opinion was that the then Mayor Hareshwar Patil of the Shiv Sena was against the continuation of Khairnar's services.

In an ironic turn of events, upon his retirement, his position of Deputy Commissioner (Special – Demolitions) was temporarily handed to Chandrashekhar Rokde, the IPS officer who had served him eviction notice during his suspension. Then his successor, Kalam Patil, was allegedly caught by the Anti Corruption Bureau(ACB) accepting an INR 250,000 bribe and while under investigation, was appointed by the Maharashtra State Road Development Corporation(MSRDC) as their Commercial Officer as well as Public Relations Officer(PRO). He was acquitted by the court subsequently. He is serving collector of Sangli District.

=== Post BMC ===
During his suspension from BMC, he wrote his autobiography Ekaki Zunj (The Lonely Fight) in Marathi in 1995.

Although he first followed Anna Hazare for guidance in social work, he later found Hazare to be too politically aligned for his liking and set off independently. Khairnar was known for rescuing minor girls from human trafficking and prostitution. He used eunuchs to rescue minor girls from Kamathipura, a red light district in Mumbai. This was an innovative spin on the practice of loan collection agents to send eunuchs to debtors' homes to embarrass them into repaying debts.

Khairnar later took up living in Bibipura village in Sabarkhata District, 70 km from Ahmedabad, working on a few development projects in rural Gujarat, funded by a US-based non-governmental organisation. While in Gujarat his health suffered a setback due to his experiments with naturopathy and thereby lacking essential salts in his body.
