= Sudhir Gadgil =

Indian politician

Member of the Maharashtra Legislative Assembly
- Incumbent
- Assumed office (2014-2019), (2019-2024), (2024-Present)
- Preceded by: Sambhaji Pawar
- Constituency: Sangli

Personal details
- Born: Dhananjay alias Sudhir Hari Gadgil; 4 April 1953 (age 73) Sangli, Bombay state
- Party: Bharatiya Janata Party
- Education: Bachelor of Commerce
- Occupation: Politician

Dhananjay alias Sudhir Hari Gadgil (born 1953) is an Indian politician from Maharashtra. He is a BJP leader from Sangli district and three-time MLA of Maharashtra Legislative Assembly from Sangli Assembly Constituency.

== Early life and education ==
Gadgil is from Sangli, Maharashtra. He is the son of Hari Vasudeo Gadgil. He completed his B.Com. in 1974 at a college affiliated with Shivaji University.

== Career ==
Gadgil became an MLA for the first time winning the 2014 Maharashtra Legislative Assembly election from Sangli Assembly constituency representing the Bharatiya Janata Party. He retained the seat for the BJP in the 2019 Maharashtra Legislative Assembly election and won for a third time in the 2024 Maharashtra Legislative Assembly election. He was involved in a controversy allegedly carrying huge sums of cash which was proved fake. He vowed not to contest again from this constituency but won the 2024 Assembly election.
