= Jaoli Assembly constituency =

Constituency of the Maharashtra legislative assembly in India

Jaoli
- Former constituency for the Maharashtra Legislative Assembly

Constituency details
- Country: India
- Region: Western India
- State: Maharashtra
- Established: 1957
- Abolished: 2008
- Total electors: 175,448

Jaoli Assembly constituency was an assembly constituency in the India state of Maharashtra.

== Members of the Legislative Assembly ==
Election	Member	Party
1957	Krishnarao Haribhau Tarade	Peasants and Workers Party of India
1962	Bhiku Daji Bhilare alias Bhilare Guruji	Indian National Congress
1967	Bhiku Daji Bhilare alias Bhilare Guruji	Indian National Congress
1972	Lalsingrao Bapuso Shinde	Indian National Congress
1978	Bhiku Daji Bhilare alias Bhilare Guruji	Indian National Congress
1980	Dhondiram Bhikoba Kadam	Indian National Congress
1985	Dhondiram Bhikoba Kadam	Indian National Congress
1986^	Genuji Govind Kadam	Indian National Congress
1990	Genuji Govind Kadam	Indian National Congress
1995	Sadashiv (Bhau) Pandurang Sapkal	Shiv Sena
1999	Shashikant Shinde	Nationalist Congress Party
2004	Shashikant Shinde	Nationalist Congress Party

== Election results ==
=== Assembly Election 2004 ===
2004 Maharashtra Legislative Assembly election : Jaoli
Party	Candidate	Votes	%	±%
NCP	Shashikant Shinde	89,240	59.78%	▲12.76
SS	Sapkal Sadashiv Pandurang	45,701	30.61%	▼5.95
Independent	Kadam Babasaheb Shivaji	6,669	4.47%	New
Independent	Jadhav Sarjerao Vitthal	3,459	2.32%	New
BSP	Joseph Henry Francis	2,878	1.93%	New
Independent	Bagal Sadashiv Sahebrao	1,344	0.90%	New
Margin of victory		43,539	29.16%	▲18.70
Turnout		149,352	71.71%	▲2.23
Total valid votes		149,291		
Registered electors		208,279		▲18.71
NCP hold		Swing	▲12.76	

=== Assembly Election 1999 ===
1999 Maharashtra Legislative Assembly election : Jaoli
Party	Candidate	Votes	%	±%
NCP	Shashikant Shinde	54,782	44.94%	New
SS	Sapkal Sadashiv Pandurang	42,596	34.94%	▼4.41
INC	Pawar Sahebrao Abaji	16,053	13.17%	▼22.37
Independent	Jadhav Santosh Laxman	1,445	1.19%	New
Independent	Kambale Vilas Namdeo	747	0.61%	New
Margin of victory		12,186	10.00%	▲6.18
Turnout		121,901	66.41%	▼3.83
Registered electors		175,448		▲0.23
NCP gain from SS		Swing	▲5.59	

=== Assembly Election 1995 ===
1995 Maharashtra Legislative Assembly election : Jaoli
Party	Candidate	Votes	%	±%
SS	Sapkal Sadashiv Pandurang	50,500	39.35%	▲19.49
INC	Kadam Genuji Govind	45,600	35.54%	▼9.05
Independent	Pawar Sahebrao Abaji	13,955	10.88%	New
Independent	Gulabrao Waman Sanas	5,736	4.47%	New
Independent	Gaikwad Mahindra Kisan	2,160	1.68%	New
Independent	Gavhale Kisan Rao Aba	1,329	1.04%	New
Independent	Adv. Jagannath Nunekar	922	0.72%	New
Margin of victory		4,900	3.82%	▼20.90
Turnout		128,320	71.22%	▲8.07
Registered electors		175,042		▲9.77
SS gain from INC		Swing	▼5.23	

=== Assembly Election 1990 ===
1990 Maharashtra Legislative Assembly election : Jaoli
Party	Candidate	Votes	%	±%
INC	Kadam Genuji Govind	46,383	44.58%	New
SS	Sapkal Sadashiv Pandurang	20,662	19.86%	New
Independent	Pawar Sahebrao Abaji	17,962	17.27%	New
JD	Sabale Balkrishna Anant	7,386	7.10%	New
Independent	Mardhekar Mansingh Genu	4,338	4.17%	New
Independent	More Suresh Balu	4,187	4.02%	New
Margin of victory		25,721	24.72%	
Turnout		104,036	64.19%	
Registered electors		159,466		
INC hold		Swing		

=== Assembly By-election 1986 ===
1986 Maharashtra Legislative Assembly by-election : Jaoli
Party	Candidate	Votes	%	±%
INC	Kadam Genuji Govind	44,852		
IC(S)	J. P. Alias. B. D	39,035		New
Margin of victory		5,817		
INC hold		Swing		

=== Assembly Election 1985 ===
1985 Maharashtra Legislative Assembly election : Jaoli
Party	Candidate	Votes	%	±%
INC	Dhondiram Bhikoba Kadam	43,057	53.50%	New
Independent	Lalsingrao Bapuso Shinde	24,429	30.35%	New
BJP	Maruti Padoba Phalae Alias Phalane Guruji	7,988	9.93%	New
Independent	Gaikwad Nivruti Ishwara	2,449	3.04%	New
Independent	Sahebrao Shivram Biramane	1,057	1.31%	New
Margin of victory		18,628	23.15%	▲21.45
Turnout		80,482	65.53%	▲1.83
Registered electors		120,522		▲5.42
INC gain from INC(U)		Swing	▲3.54	

=== Assembly Election 1980 ===
1980 Maharashtra Legislative Assembly election : Jaoli
Party	Candidate	Votes	%	±%
INC(U)	Kadam Dhondiram Bhikoba	37,095	49.96%	New
INC(I)	Sabale Balkrishna Anant	35,834	48.26%	▲34.66
Margin of victory		1,261	1.70%	▼3.81
Turnout		74,250	63.79%	▼5.39
Registered electors		114,325		▲8.23
INC(U) gain from INC		Swing		

=== Assembly Election 1978 ===
1978 Maharashtra Legislative Assembly election : Jaoli
Party	Candidate	Votes	%	±%
INC	Bnilare Bhiku Daji	23,217	31.25%	▼31.30
Independent	Sabale Balkrishna Anant	19,123	25.74%	New
INC(I)	Mardhekar Mansingh Genu	10,109	13.61%	New
JP	Pawar Madhu Shivajirao	7,481	10.07%	New
Independent	Bhilare Maruti Rayaji	5,819	7.83%	New
Independent	Gole Dhondiba Ramchandra	1,663	2.24%	New
PWPI	Bhilare Shankar Ganpat	1,571	2.11%	New
Margin of victory		4,094	5.51%	▼23.07
Turnout		74,299	68.96%	▲4.43
Registered electors		105,632		▲38.22
INC hold		Swing	▼31.30	

=== Assembly Election 1972 ===
1972 Maharashtra Legislative Assembly election : Jaoli
Party	Candidate	Votes	%	±%
INC	Lalsingrao Bapuso Shinde	31,504	62.55%	▼13.39
Independent	Bhilare Maruti Rayaji	17,111	33.97%	New
Margin of victory		14,393	28.58%	▼36.96
Turnout		50,365	64.01%	▼0.24
Registered electors		76,422		▲17.68
INC hold		Swing		

=== Assembly Election 1967 ===
1967 Maharashtra Legislative Assembly election : Jaoli
Party	Candidate	Votes	%	±%
INC	Bnilare Bhiku Daji	32,618	75.94%	▲2.86
PWPI	K. H. Tarade	4,466	10.40%	▼4.15
Independent	L. K. Shinde	2,075	4.83%	New
Independent	N. I. Gaikwad	2,057	4.08%	New
Margin of victory		28,152	65.54%	▲7.00
Turnout		42,953	63.47%	▼4.05
Registered electors		64,940		▲17.21
INC hold		Swing	▲2.86	

=== Assembly Election 1962 ===
1962 Maharashtra Legislative Assembly election : Jaoli
Party	Candidate	Votes	%	±%
INC	Bnilare Bhiku Daji	28,423	77.05%	▲49.06
PWPI	Ganpat Shivram Bhilare	5,656	15.33%	▼29.59
SWA	Govindrao Khanderao Shinde	2,811	7.62%	New
Margin of victory		22,767	61.72%	▲44.78
Turnout		38,892	70.20%	▲18.45
Total valid votes		36,890		
Registered electors		55,404		▲5.65
INC gain from PWPI		Swing	▲32.13	

=== Assembly Election 1957 ===
1957 Bombay State Legislative Assembly election : Jaoli
Party	Candidate	Votes	%	±%
PWPI	Tarade Krishnarao Haribhau	11,338	44.92%	New
INC	Omble Baburao Ramchandra	7,064	27.99%	New
Independent	Sankpal Babu Dhondiba	3,648	14.45%	New
Independent	Shinde Govind Khanderao	3,189	12.64%	New
Margin of victory		4,274	16.93%	
Turnout		25,239	48.13%	
Total valid votes		25,239		
Registered electors		52,439		
PWPI win (new seat)				
