= Vasantdada Patil =

Indian politician

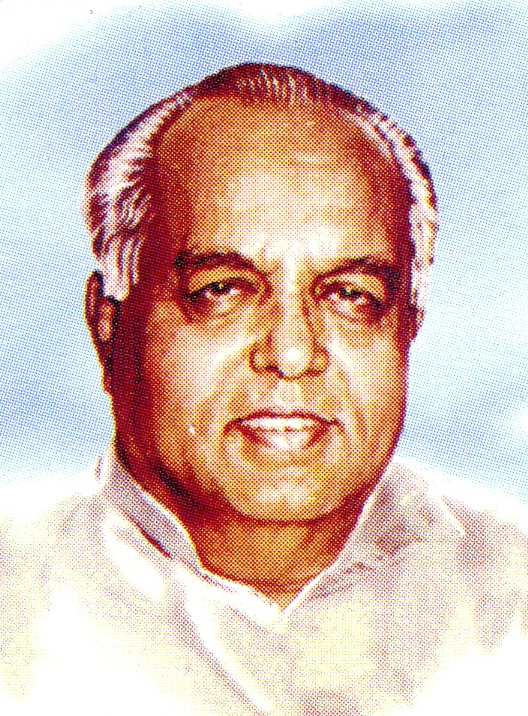

7th Governor of Rajasthan
- In office 20 November 1985 – 15 October 1987
- Preceded by: Om Prakash Mehra
- Succeeded by: Sukhdev Prasad

6th Chief Minister of Maharashtra
- In office 2 February 1983 – 3 June 1985
- Preceded by: Babasaheb Bhosale
- Succeeded by: Shivajirao Nilangekar Patil
- In office 17 May 1977 – 18 July 1978
- Preceded by: Shankarrao Chavan
- Succeeded by: Sharad Pawar

Member of Parliament, Lok Sabha
- In office 1980–1983
- Preceded by: Ganapati Gotkhinde
- Succeeded by: Shalini Patil
- Constituency: Sangli

Member of Maharashtra Legislative Assembly
- In office 1978–1980
- Preceded by: Pandurang Bapu Patil
- Succeeded by: Shalini Patil
- Constituency: Sangli
- In office 1952–1967
- Preceded by: Constituency created
- Succeeded by: A. B. Birnale
- Constituency: Sangli

Personal details
- Born: Vasantrao Banduji Patil; 13 November 1917 Sangli, Bombay Presidency, British India
- Died: 1 March 1989 (aged 71) Bombay, Maharashtra, India
- Party: Indian National Congress
- Spouse(s): Malatitai Patil; Shalini Patil
- Children: Prakashbapu Patil
- Parent: Banduji Kadam Patil (father)
- Relatives: Pratik Patil (grandson); Vishal Patil (grandson)

Vasantrao Banduji Kadam Patil (13 November 1917 – 1 March 1989) was an Indian politician from Sangli, Maharashtra. He was known as the first modern Maratha strongman and first mass leader in Maharashtrian politics.

Patil served as Chief Minister of Maharashtra from 17 May 1977 to 18 July 1978 and again from 2 February 1983 to 1 June 1985. He also served as the governor of Rajasthan for a little under two years from 1985 to 1987.

== Personal life ==
Born on 13 November 1917 at 'Padmale' 3 km (1.9 mi) from Sangli, his native village. He was a Kadam-Patil. He studied up to the vernacular final. Then he became a farmer. His first wife, Malati-tai Patil died in 1960s. Soon later, he married Shalinitai Patil (then Shalini Jadhav before her second marriage) who was a widow herself with four children from her first marriage. She herself was a minister in Maharashtra in 1980s. Vasantdada did not have any children from his second marriage. His son from the first marriage with Malti-tai Patil, named Prakash Patil, represented Sangli in Lok Sabha. After Prakash Patil's death in 2005, his son (and Vasantdada's grandson) Pratik Patil became MP from Sangli twice.

== Freedom fighter ==
Vasantdada was jailed by the British in the 1940s for his activity in the independence movement.

== Political career ==
He was Chief Minister of Maharashtra three times between 1976 and 1985.

He was elected as a member of 7th Lok Sabha from Sangli (Lok Sabha constituency) in 1980.

== Political and family connections ==
In 1985 he was embroiled in a public dispute with a Deputy Commissioner of BMC, G R Khairnar, for having demolished Patil's son's hotel "Step In". Khairnar eventually became a hero for taking on politicians, including Sharad Pawar. This dispute, meanwhile, discredited Congress rule and combined with other issues, gave the Shiv Sena-BJP combination an upper hand in subsequent elections.

His elder son Prakashbapu Vasantdada Patil and his grandson Pratik Prakashbapu Patil are former MPs from Sangli.

Vasantadada had a vast circle, but few close friends. Among these were Dhulappa Navale, V.S.Page, Charudatta (Charubhai) Shah, P Pandurang Kadam (Tatya), Sampatrao Mane (Nana) and Vitthal Patil.

In 1958, Vasantdada Patil, along with friends including Dhulappa Navale, Rambhau Arwade, Abasaheb Shinde, Shankarao Shinde, and Abasaheb Kulkarni (Khebudkar), established pioneering cooperative projects.

His second wife, Shalinitai Patil, is an MLA from Koregaon, Satara district. She joined the Nationalist Congress Party (NCP) in 1999, but was expelled for her opposition to reservation of 27.5% for Other Backward Classes (OBCs) in academic institutes such as Indian Institutes of Technology (IIT) and Indian Institutes of Management (IIM). However, she later declared that Marathas were too big a community for any political party to displease, and said "... the economically backward classes across all communities should be given reservation. At least 50 per cent of Maharashtra's population needs quotas."

Vasantdada Patil died on 1 March 1989.

== Recognition ==
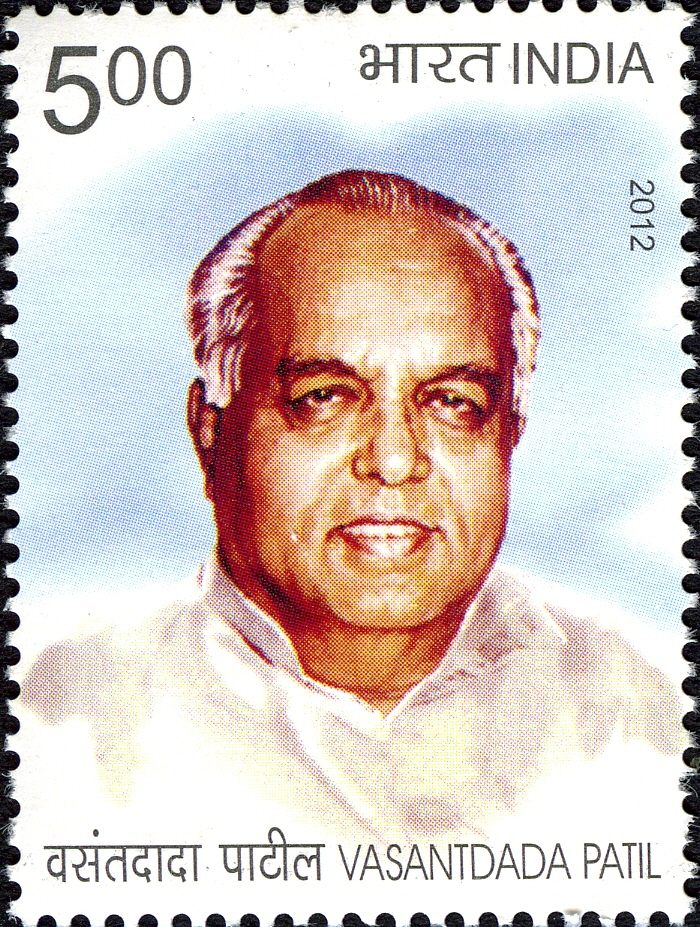
Patil on a 2012 stamp of India

- Padma Bhushan award (1967).
- Padmabhushan Vasantdada Patil Pratishthan's College of Engineering in Mumbai is named in his honour.

== See also ==
- Sharad Pawar
- Sundarrao Solanke
- Vilasrao Deshmukh
