= Koregaon Assembly constituency =

Constituency of the Maharashtra legislative assembly in India

Coordinates: 17°41′50.05″N 74°09′10.20″E

Koregaon
- Constituency No. 257 for the Maharashtra Legislative Assembly

Constituency details
- Country: India
- Region: Western India
- State: Maharashtra
- District: Satara
- Lok Sabha constituency: Satara
- Established: 1951
- Total electors: 324,454
- Reservation: None

Member of Legislative Assembly
- 15th Maharashtra Legislative Assembly
- Incumbent Mahesh Shinde
- Party: SHS
- Alliance: NDA
- Elected year: 2024

Koregaon Assembly constituency of Maharashtra Vidhan Sabha is one of the constituencies located in the Satara district, in the Koregaon area.

It is a part of the Satara (Lok Sabha constituency), along with five other assembly constituencies, viz Wai, Karad North, Karad South, Satara and Patan from the Satara district.

== Members of the Legislative Assembly ==
Election	Member	Party
1952	Shankarrao Ganpatrao Ghatge	Indian National Congress
1957	Vishwasrao Vithalrao Mane	Indian National Congress
1962	Tushar Pandurang Pawar	Indian National Congress
1967	A. N. Phalke	Indian National Congress
1972	Dattajirao B. Barge	Independent politician
1978	Shankarrao Chimaji Jagtap	Indian National Congress
1980	Shankarrao Chimaji Jagtap	Indian National Congress
1985	Shankarrao Chimaji Jagtap	Indian National Congress
1990	Shankarrao Chimaji Jagtap	Indian National Congress
1995	Shankarrao Chimaji Jagtap	Indian National Congress
1999	Dr. Shalini Patil	Nationalist Congress Party
2004	Dr. Shalini Patil	Nationalist Congress Party
2009	Shashikant Shinde	Nationalist Congress Party
2014	Shashikant Shinde	Nationalist Congress Party
2019	Mahesh Sambhajiraje Shinde	Shiv Sena
2024	Mahesh Sambhajiraje Shinde	Shiv Sena

== Election results ==
=== Assembly Election 2024 ===
2024 Maharashtra Legislative Assembly election : Koregaon
Party	Candidate	Votes	%	±%
SS	Mahesh Sambhajiraje Shinde	146,166	58.18%	▲8.28
NCP-SP	Shashikant Shinde	101,103	40.25%	New
NOTA	None of the above	1,042	0.41%	▼0.22
Margin of victory		45,063	17.94%	▲14.88
Turnout		252,258	77.75%	▲9.57
Total valid votes		251,216		
Registered electors		324,454		▲7.33
SS hold		Swing	▲8.28	

=== Assembly Election 2019 ===
2019 Maharashtra Legislative Assembly election : Koregaon
Party	Candidate	Votes	%	±%
SS	Mahesh Sambhajiraje Shinde	101,487	49.90%	▲40.92
NCP	Shashikant Shinde	95,255	46.83%	▼7.06
VBA	Dr. Balasaheb Santu Chavan	2,583	1.27%	New
BSP	Kiran Kashinath Sawant	2,088	1.03%	▲0.53
NOTA	None of the above	1,284	0.63%	▼0.50
Margin of victory		6,232	3.06%	▼23.68
Turnout		206,121	68.18%	▲7.66
Total valid votes		203,400		
Registered electors		302,300		▲2.31
SS gain from NCP		Swing	▼3.99	

=== Assembly Election 2014 ===
2014 Maharashtra Legislative Assembly election : Koregaon
Party	Candidate	Votes	%	±%
NCP	Shashikant Shinde	95,213	53.89%	▲4.24
INC	Kanase Vijayrao Baburao	47,966	27.15%	New
SS	Chaware Hanmant Baba	15,862	8.98%	▼1.29
SWP	Bhagat Sanjay Babaso	13,126	7.43%	New
NOTA	None of the above	1,991	1.13%	New
MNS	Yuraj Ramchandra Pawar	1,766	1.00%	New
Independent	Shivaji Laxman Shirtode	1,492	0.84%	New
Margin of victory		47,247	26.74%	▲7.13
Turnout		178,815	60.52%	▼1.59
Total valid votes		176,695		
Registered electors		295,464		▲13.23
NCP hold		Swing	▲4.24	

=== Assembly Election 2009 ===
2009 Maharashtra Legislative Assembly election : Koregaon
Party	Candidate	Votes	%	±%
NCP	Shashikant Shinde	80,373	49.65%	▼1.64
Independent	Dr. Shalini Patil	48,620	30.03%	New
SS	Santosh Laxman Jadhav	16,621	10.27%	▲8.01
Independent	Bhosale Yashawant (Bhau)	10,701	6.61%	New
BSP	More Mahendra Bhiva	1,514	0.94%	▼0.55
Independent	Suresh Baburao Veer	1,215	0.75%	New
Independent	Ramesh Pandurang Borge (Patil)	1,193	0.74%	New
Margin of victory		31,753	19.61%	▼9.66
Turnout		162,076	62.11%	▼4.99
Total valid votes		161,886		
Registered electors		260,933		▲46.25
NCP hold		Swing	▼1.64	

=== Assembly Election 2004 ===
2004 Maharashtra Legislative Assembly election : Koregaon
Party	Candidate	Votes	%	±%
NCP	Dr. Shalini Patil	61,326	51.29%	▼7.56
Independent	Mahadik Shivajirao Anandrao (Sir)	26,322	22.01%	New
Independent	Patil Bhimrao Parasharam (Kaka)	23,636	19.77%	New
SS	Ajit Anandrao Mane	2,708	2.26%	▼4.16
Independent	Mane Ramesh Dagdu (Appasaheb)	2,068	1.73%	New
BSP	Adv. Suresh Kamalakar Mane	1,785	1.49%	New
Independent	Khandait Chandrakant Tatu	880	0.74%	New
RSPS	Bhausaheb Gangaram Wagh	847	0.71%	New
Margin of victory		35,004	29.27%	▲4.83
Turnout		119,712	67.10%	▼6.08
Total valid votes		119,572		
Registered electors		178,415		▲18.41
NCP hold		Swing	▼7.56	

=== Assembly Election 1999 ===
1999 Maharashtra Legislative Assembly election : Koregaon
Party	Candidate	Votes	%	±%
NCP	Dr. Shalini Patil	61,692	58.85%	New
INC	Jagtap Shankarrao Chimaji	36,069	34.40%	▼15.61
SS	Barge Dattajirao Nivratti	6,726	6.42%	▲2.45
Margin of victory		25,623	24.44%	▲19.43
Turnout		110,267	73.18%	▼5.95
Total valid votes		104,837		
Registered electors		150,679		▼2.43
NCP gain from INC		Swing	▲8.84	

=== Assembly Election 1995 ===
1995 Maharashtra Legislative Assembly election : Koregaon
Party	Candidate	Votes	%	±%
INC	Jagtap Shankarrao Chimaji	59,793	50.01%	▼3.65
Independent	Dr. Shalini Patil	53,807	45.00%	New
SS	Pandit Shrikant Dattatraya	4,744	3.97%	▲0.73
Independent	Sonawane Vinayak Kedari	891	0.75%	New
Margin of victory		5,986	5.01%	▼6.02
Turnout		122,212	79.13%	▲6.03
Total valid votes		119,559		
Registered electors		154,436		▲6.05
INC hold		Swing	▼3.65	

=== Assembly Election 1990 ===
1990 Maharashtra Legislative Assembly election : Koregaon
Party	Candidate	Votes	%	±%
INC	Jagtap Shankarrao Chimaji	56,247	53.66%	▼5.03
JD	Dr. Shalini Patil	44,688	42.63%	New
SS	Nanasaheb Bhosale	3,398	3.24%	New
Margin of victory		11,559	11.03%	▼7.15
Turnout		106,451	73.10%	▲1.55
Total valid votes		104,819		
Registered electors		145,622		▲25.14
INC hold		Swing	▼5.03	

=== Assembly Election 1985 ===
1985 Maharashtra Legislative Assembly election : Koregaon
Party	Candidate	Votes	%	±%
INC	Jagtap Shankarrao Chimaji	48,049	58.69%	New
IC(S)	Phalke Shivaji Govindrao	33,165	40.51%	New
Independent	Mane Balkrishna Ramchandra	654	0.80%	New
Margin of victory		14,884	18.18%	▼0.15
Turnout		83,263	71.55%	▲12.06
Total valid votes		81,868		
Registered electors		116,363		▲6.44
INC gain from INC(U)		Swing	▲3.67	

=== Assembly Election 1980 ===
1980 Maharashtra Legislative Assembly election : Koregaon
Party	Candidate	Votes	%	±%
INC(U)	Jagtap Shankarrao Chimaji	34,829	55.02%	New
INC(I)	Barge Dattajirao Bhausaheb	23,227	36.69%	New
Independent	Mane Gulabrao Ramchandra	3,446	5.44%	New
Independent	More Jaikumar Jagannath	1,304	2.06%	New
Independent	Barge Shankarrao Hariba	493	0.78%	New
Margin of victory		11,602	18.33%	▲9.80
Turnout		65,037	59.49%	▼14.80
Total valid votes		63,299		
Registered electors		109,324		▲12.78
INC(U) gain from INC		Swing	▲11.40	

=== Assembly Election 1978 ===
1978 Maharashtra Legislative Assembly election : Koregaon
Party	Candidate	Votes	%	±%
INC	Jagtap Shankarrao Chimaji	30,765	43.62%	▲10.62
Independent	Pandurang Nilkanthrao Alias Babasaheb Mane	24,745	35.08%	New
JP	Bhandari Shantilal Rajaram	9,075	12.87%	New
Independent	Gurao Baburao Narayan	2,656	3.77%	New
Independent	Janardan Dhondiraj Puranik	2,300	3.26%	New
Independent	Talekar Vithalrao Shivram	993	1.41%	New
Margin of victory		6,020	8.53%	▼25.46
Turnout		72,018	74.29%	▲3.06
Total valid votes		70,534		
Registered electors		96,939		▲14.95
INC gain from Independent		Swing	▼23.38	

=== Assembly Election 1972 ===
1972 Maharashtra Legislative Assembly election : Koregaon
Party	Candidate	Votes	%	±%
Independent	Dattajirao B. Barge	39,225	67.00%	New
INC	Phalke Vasantrao Jyotirao	19,322	33.00%	▼45.19
Margin of victory		19,903	33.99%	▼22.38
Turnout		60,072	71.23%	▼0.96
Total valid votes		58,547		
Registered electors		84,332		▲18.47
Independent gain from INC		Swing	▼11.19	

=== Assembly Election 1967 ===
1967 Maharashtra Legislative Assembly election : Koregaon
Party	Candidate	Votes	%	±%
INC	A. N. Phalke	37,547	78.19%	▲27.27
SSP	P. N. Deshpande	10,476	21.81%	New
Margin of victory		27,071	56.37%	▲25.48
Turnout		51,387	72.19%	▲6.99
Total valid votes		48,023		
Registered electors		71,187		▲5.95
INC hold		Swing	▲27.27	

=== Assembly Election 1962 ===
1962 Maharashtra Legislative Assembly election : Koregaon
Party	Candidate	Votes	%	±%
INC	Tushar Pandurang Pawar	20,609	50.92%	▲8.92
Independent	Vithal Pandurang Bhosale	8,107	20.03%	New
CPI	Kakoji Krishana Kadam	6,235	15.41%	New
Independent	Pilajrao Dhondiram Dhumal	1,864	4.61%	New
PSP	Pandurang Kondiba Borate	1,637	4.04%	New
Independent	Dinkarrai Dagdoba Deshmukh	733	1.81%	New
Independent	Mugutrao Ganpati Shinde	522	1.29%	New
Margin of victory		12,502	30.89%	▲27.95
Turnout		43,809	65.20%	▲8.45
Total valid votes		40,471		
Registered electors		67,190		▲22.16
INC hold		Swing	▲8.92	

=== Assembly Election 1957 ===
1957 Bombay State Legislative Assembly election : Koregaon
Party	Candidate	Votes	%	±%
INC	Mane Vishwasrao Vithalrao	13,110	42.00%	▲11.29
Independent	Deshmukh Dinkarrao Dagadoba	12,192	39.06%	New
Independent	Phalke Rajaram Vyankat	5,910	18.94%	New
Margin of victory		918	2.94%	▼12.48
Turnout		31,212	56.75%	▲2.87
Total valid votes		31,212		
Registered electors		55,000		▼0.12
INC hold		Swing	▲11.29	

=== Assembly Election 1952 ===
1952 Bombay State Legislative Assembly election : Koregaon
Party	Candidate	Votes	%	±%
INC	Gharge Shankarrao Ganpatrao	9,112	30.71%	New
Socialist	Borate Pandurang Kondiba	4,536	15.29%	New
Kamgar Kisan Paksha	Pawar Tushar Pandugrang	3,280	11.05%	New
Independent	Kulkarni Ganesh Ramchandra	2,933	9.88%	New
Independent	Vichare Keshav Vishram	2,502	8.43%	New
PWPI	Mhetras Dattatraya Balvant	2,238	7.54%	New
Independent	Mane Raghunathrao Anandrao	2,091	7.05%	New
Independent	Patil Ramrao Dadasahab	1,402	4.72%	New
Independent	Ghorpade Sopanrao Kusdlika	829	2.79%	New
Independent	Katkar Nagesh Maruti	750	2.53%	New
Margin of victory		4,576	15.42%	
Turnout		29,673	53.88%	
Total valid votes		29,673		
Registered electors		55,068		
INC win (new seat)				

== See also ==
- List of constituencies of Maharashtra Legislative Assembly
- Koregaon
