= Mahesh Shinde =

Indian politician

Member of the Maharashtra Legislative Assembly
- Incumbent
- Assumed office October 2019
- Preceded by: Shashikant Shinde
- Constituency: Koregaon

Personal details
- Born: 8 August 1975 (age 50) Khatav
- Party: Shiv Sena (Shinde)

Mahesh Shinde is a politician from Satara district, Maharashtra, India. He is a member of the Maharashtra Legislative Assembly from Koregaon Vidhan Sabha constituency and a member of Shiv Sena (Shinde).

== Positions held ==
- 2019: Elected to Maharashtra Legislative Assembly
- 2024: Elected to Maharashtra Legislative Assembly
