= Shashikant Shinde =

Indian politician

Shashikant Jayawantrao Shinde
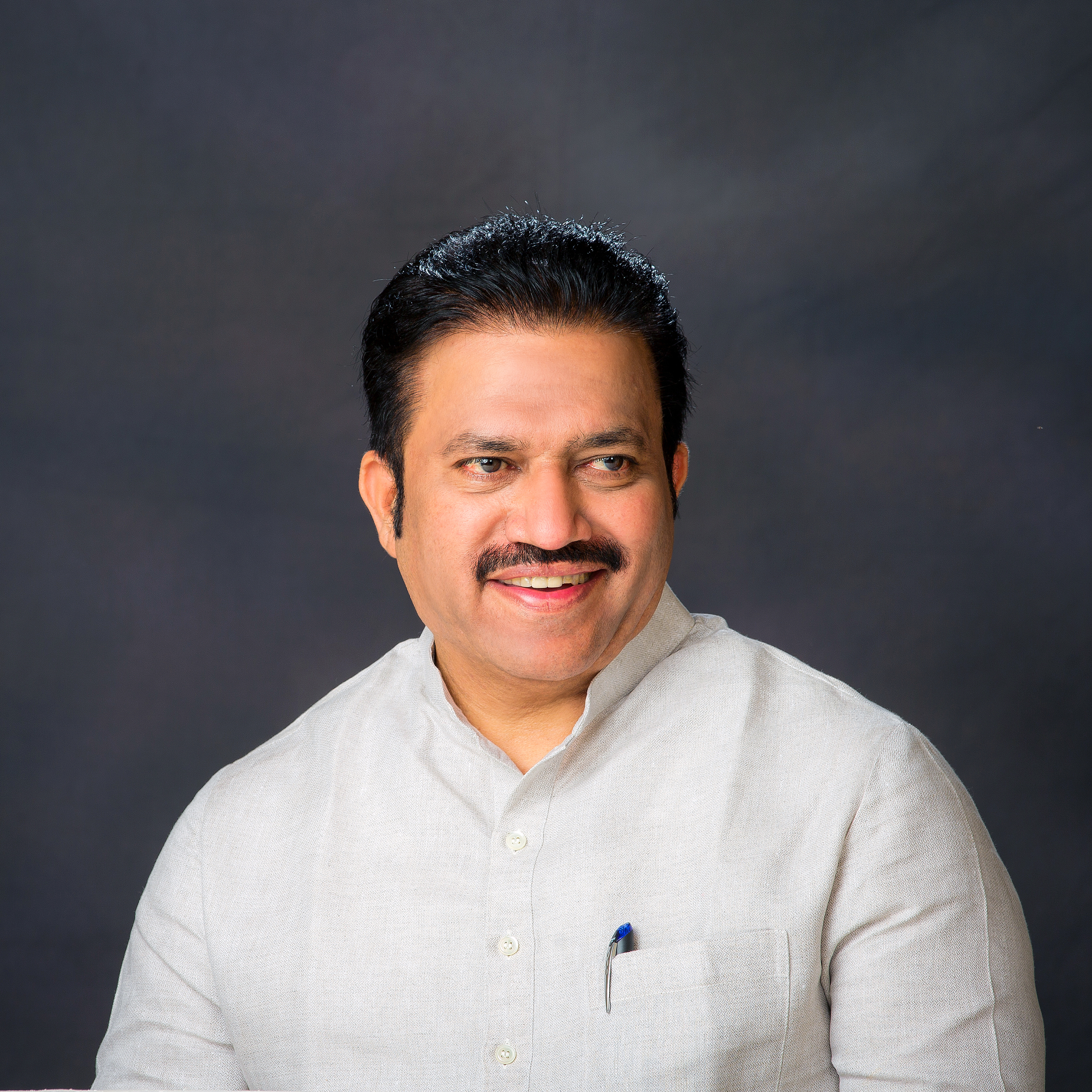

State President of NCP (Sharad Pawar) – Maharashtra
- Incumbent
- Assumed office 15 July 2025
- National President NCP(SP): Sharad Pawar
- Preceded by: Jayant Patil

Member of the Maharashtra Legislative Council
- Incumbent
- Assumed office 14 May 2020
- Governor: Bhagat Singh Koshiyari, Ramesh Bais, C. P. Radhakrishnan, Santosh Gangwar
- Chair: Ramraje Naik Nimbalkar
- Constituency: MLA's elect

Cabinet Minister, Government of Maharashtra
- In office 11 June 2013 – 28 September 2014
- Minister: Minister of Water Resources (Krishna Valley Irrigation)
- Governor: K. Sankaranarayanan; Om Prakash KohliC. Vidyasagar Rao
- Chief Minister: Prithviraj Chavan
- Preceded by: Ramraje Naik Nimbalkar

Member of the Maharashtra Legislative Assembly
- In office 2009–2019
- Preceded by: Shalini Patil
- Succeeded by: Mahesh Shinde
- Constituency: Koregaon
- In office 1999–2009
- Preceded by: Sadashiv (Bhau) Pandurang Sapkal
- Succeeded by: Constituency abolished
- Constituency: Jaoli

Personal details
- Born: 19 October 1963 (age 62)
- Party: Nationalist Congress Party (Sharadchandra Pawar)
- Spouse: Vaishali Shinde
- Children: 2
- Website: www.shashikantshinde.in

Shashikant Jayawantrao Shinde (born 19 October 1963) is an Indian politician from the Nationalist Congress Party (Sharadchandra Pawar). As of 15 July 2025, he serves as the State President of the NCP (Sharadchandra Pawar) in Maharashtra.

He currently serves as a member of the Maharashtra Legislative Council, elected by MLAs in May 2020. He has previously served as a Cabinet Minister in the Prithviraj Chavan ministry, holding the Water Resources portfolio, specifically for the Krishna Valley Irrigation Corporation.

Shinde is a senior political leader from Koregaon, in Satara district, Maharashtra. He was elected multiple times to the Maharashtra Legislative Assembly — from Jaoli constituency (1999–2009) and later from Koregaon (2009–2019).

In June 2013, he was inducted into the state cabinet as Minister of Water Resources under Chief Minister Prithviraj Chavan.

He was elected as MLA from Koregaon in the 2009 and 2014 Maharashtra Legislative Assembly elections, representing the NCP.

In November 2019, he was appointed as Vice-President of the NCP's Maharashtra unit.

== See also ==
- Nationalist Congress Party Sharadchandra Pawar
- Maharashtra Legislative Council
- Maharashtra Legislative Assembly
