= Palus-Kadegaon Assembly constituency =

Constituency of the Maharashtra legislative assembly in India

Coordinates: 17.21°N 74.40°E

Palus-Kadegaon
- Constituency No. 285 for the Maharashtra Legislative Assembly
- Vishwajeet Kadam, present MLA of Palus-Kadegaon

Constituency details
- Country: India
- Region: Western India
- State: Maharashtra
- District: Sangli
- Lok Sabha constituency: Sangli
- Total electors: 293,574
- Reservation: None

Member of Legislative Assembly
- 15th Maharashtra Legislative Assembly
- Incumbent Vishwajeet Kadam
- Party: INC
- Alliance: MVA
- Elected year: 2024

Palus-Kadegaon Assembly constituency is one of the 288 Vidhan Sabha (legislative assembly) constituencies of Maharashtra state in western India.

== Overview ==
Palus-Kadegaon constituency is one of the eight Vidhan Sabha constituencies located in Sangli district.

Palus-Kadegaon is part of Sangli Lok Sabha constituency along with five other Vidhan Sabha segments in this district, namely Miraj, Sangli, Khanapur, Tasgao-Kavathemahakal and Jat.

== Members of Legislative Assembly ==
Year	Member	Party
Before 2009 : See Bhilwadi Wangi
2009	Patangrao Kadam	Indian National Congress
2014	Patangrao Kadam	Indian National Congress
2018^	Vishwajeet Kadam	Indian National Congress
2019	Vishwajeet Kadam	Indian National Congress
2024	Vishwajeet Kadam	Indian National Congress

^ By-elections

== Election results ==
=== Assembly Election 2024 ===
2024 Maharashtra Legislative Assembly election : Palus-Kadegaon
Party	Candidate	Votes	%	±%
INC	Vishwajeet Patangrao Kadam	130,769	56.10	▼36.16
BJP	Sangram Sampatrao Deshmukh	100,705	43.20	New
NOTA	None of the Above	899	0.39	▼10.71
Margin of victory		30,064	12.90	▼68.26
Turnout		234,010	79.71	▲12.69
Total valid votes		233,111		
Registered electors		293,574		▲5.36
INC hold		Swing	▼36.16	

=== Assembly Election 2019 ===
2019 Maharashtra Legislative Assembly election : Palus-Kadegaon
Party	Candidate	Votes	%	±%
INC	Vishwajeet Patangrao Kadam	171,497	83.04	New
NOTA	None of the Above	20,631	11.10	New
SS	Sanjay Ananda Vibhute	8,976	4.83	New
Independent	Adv. Pramod Ganpatrao Patil	2,132	1.15	New
Margin of victory		150,866	81.16	
Turnout		206,715	74.19	
Total valid votes		185,886		
Registered electors		278,629		▼7.72
INC hold		Swing		

=== Assembly By-election 2018 ===
2018 Maharashtra Legislative Assembly by-election : Palus-Kadegaon
Party	Candidate	Votes	%	±%
INC	Vishwajeet Patangrao Kadam	Unopposed		
Registered electors		301,947		
INC hold		Swing		

=== Assembly Election 2014 ===
2014 Maharashtra Legislative Assembly election : Palus-Kadegaon
Party	Candidate	Votes	%	±%
INC	Dr. Patangrao Kadam	112,523	54.11	▼4.26
BJP	Pruthviraj Sayajirao Deshmukh	88,489	42.55	New
SS	Lalasaheb Narayan Gondil	2,208	1.06	New
NCP	Sandeep Rajoba Dhanpal	1,686	0.81	New
NOTA	None of the Above	640	0.31	New
Margin of victory		24,034	11.56	▼8.00
Turnout		209,054	82.14	▲3.70
Total valid votes		207,944		
Registered electors		254,502		▲9.11
INC hold		Swing	▼4.26	

=== Assembly Election 2009 ===
2009 Maharashtra Legislative Assembly election : Palus-Kadegaon
Party	Candidate	Votes	%	±%
INC	Dr. Patangrao Kadam	106,211	58.37	New
Independent	Pruthviraj Sayajirao Deshmukh	70,626	38.82	New
Independent	Mahendrakumar Alias Mahesh Deshmukh	1,504	0.83	New
BSP	Shivling Krishna Sonavane	1,218	0.67	New
Margin of victory		35,585	19.56	
Turnout		182,008	78.03	
Total valid votes		181,949		
Registered electors		233,259		
INC win (new seat)				

== See also ==
- Palus, Maharashtra
- List of constituencies of the Maharashtra Legislative Assembly
