= Miraj Assembly constituency =

Constituency of the Maharashtra legislative assembly in India.

Coordinates: 16.83°N 74.64°E

Miraj
- Constituency No. 281 for the Maharashtra Legislative Assembly

Constituency details
- Country: India
- Region: Western India
- State: Maharashtra
- Lok Sabha constituency: Sangli
- Established: 1962
- Total electors: 344,731
- Reservation: SC

Member of Legislative Assembly
- 15th Maharashtra Legislative Assembly
- Incumbent Suresh Khade
- Party: BJP
- Elected year: 2024

Miraj Assembly constituency is one of the 288 Vidhan Sabha (legislative assembly) constituencies of Maharashtra state in western India.

== Members of the Legislative Assembly ==
| Election | Member | Party |
|---|---|---|
| 1952 | Shrimatibai Charudatta Kalantre | Indian National Congress |
| 1957 | Gundu Dasharath Patil | Indian National Congress |
| 1962 | Gundu Dasharath Patil | Indian National Congress |
| 1967 | Gundu Dasharath Patil | Indian National Congress |
| 1972 | Narsinha R. Pathak | Independent politician |
| 1978 | Mohanrao Alias Ramsing Ganpatrao Shinde | Indian National Congress |
| 1980 | Mohanrao Alias Ramsing Ganpatrao Shinde | Indian National Congress |
| 1985 | Mohanrao Alias Ramsing Ganpatrao Shinde | Indian National Congress |
| 1990 | Sharad Ramgonda Patil | Janata Dal |
| 1995 | Sharad Ramgonda Patil | Janata Dal |
| 1999 | Hafizbhai Husen Dhatture | Indian National Congress |
| 2004 | Hafizbhai Husen Dhatture | Indian National Congress |
| 2009 | Dr. Suresh Dagadu Khade | Bharatiya Janata Party |
| 2014 | Dr. Suresh Dagadu Khade | Bharatiya Janata Party |
| 2019 | Dr. Suresh Dagadu Khade | Bharatiya Janata Party |
| 2024 | Dr. Suresh Dagadu Khade | Bharatiya Janata Party |

== Election results ==
=== Assembly Election 2024 ===
2024 Maharashtra Legislative Assembly election : Miraj
| Party | Candidate | Votes | % | ±% |
|---|---|---|---|---|
| BJP | Dr. Suresh Dagadu Khade | 129,766 | 57.03% | ▲2.61 |
| SS(UBT) | Tanaji Ananda Satpute | 84,571 | 37.17% | New |
| VBA | Vidnyan Prakash Mane | 5,528 | 2.43% | ▼2.60 |
| AIMIM | Maheshkumar Mahadev Kamble | 2,599 | 1.14% | New |
| NOTA | None of the above | 1,350 | 0.59% | ▼0.99 |
| Margin of victory | | 45,195 | 19.86% | ▲2.69 |
| Turnout | | 228,875 | 66.39% | ▲11.24 |
| Total valid votes | | 227,525 | | |
| Registered electors | | 344,731 | | ▲5.59 |
| BJP hold | | Swing | ▲2.61 | |

=== Assembly Election 2019 ===
2019 Maharashtra Legislative Assembly election : Miraj
| Party | Candidate | Votes | % | ±% |
|---|---|---|---|---|
| BJP | Dr. Suresh Dagadu Khade | 96,369 | 54.42% | ▲3.06 |
| SWP | Balaso Dattatray Honmore | 65,971 | 37.25% | New |
| VBA | Nanaso Sadashiv Waghmare | 8,902 | 5.03% | New |
| NOTA | None of the above | 2,792 | 1.58% | ▲0.07 |
| JD(S) | Sadashiv Dashrath Khade | 2,595 | 1.47% | New |
| BSP | Gangaram Shivmurti Satpute | 1,443 | 0.81% | ▲0.04 |
| Baliraja Party | Balasaheb Yashvant Raste | 1,141 | 0.64% | New |
| Margin of victory | | 30,398 | 17.17% | ▼17.92 |
| Turnout | | 180,075 | 55.15% | ▼6.09 |
| Total valid votes | | 177,092 | | |
| Registered electors | | 326,494 | | ▲7.75 |
| BJP hold | | Swing | ▲3.06 | |

=== Assembly Election 2014 ===
2014 Maharashtra Legislative Assembly election : Miraj
| Party | Candidate | Votes | % | ±% |
|---|---|---|---|---|
| BJP | Dr. Suresh Dagadu Khade | 93,795 | 51.36% | ▼4.71 |
| INC | Shidheshwar Atamaram Jadhav | 29,728 | 16.28% | ▼8.14 |
| Independent | C. R. Sanglikar | 21,598 | 11.83% | New |
| SS | Satpute Tanaji Aanadrao | 20,160 | 11.04% | New |
| NCP | Honmore Balaso Dattatry | 10,999 | 6.02% | New |
| NOTA | None of the above | 2,759 | 1.51% | New |
| BSP | Kamble Vidhyasagar Subhash | 1,411 | 0.77% | ▲0.18 |
| Margin of victory | | 64,067 | 35.09% | ▲3.44 |
| Turnout | | 185,567 | 61.24% | ▼1.54 |
| Total valid votes | | 182,605 | | |
| Registered electors | | 303,011 | | ▲10.42 |
| BJP hold | | Swing | ▼4.71 | |

=== Assembly Election 2009 ===
2009 Maharashtra Legislative Assembly election : Miraj
| Party | Candidate | Votes | % | ±% |
|---|---|---|---|---|
| BJP | Dr. Suresh Dagadu Khade | 96,482 | 56.07% | New |
| INC | Honmore Balaso Dattatrya | 42,026 | 24.42% | ▼7.75 |
| Independent | Karpe Sushma Kisan Alias Kaji Ayesha Mahmmad | 13,026 | 7.57% | New |
| RPI | Kamble Vivek Appa | 6,320 | 3.67% | New |
| Independent | Yadavrao Hirappa Kamble Alias Sachit Tasgaonkar | 3,721 | 2.16% | New |
| MNS | Sunil Ram Basakhetre | 2,748 | 1.60% | New |
| Independent | Prakash Ananda Bansode | 1,592 | 0.93% | New |
| Margin of victory | | 54,456 | 31.65% | ▲23.52 |
| Turnout | | 172,274 | 62.78% | ▼1.53 |
| Total valid votes | | 172,066 | | |
| Registered electors | | 274,422 | | ▲25.60 |
| BJP gain from INC | | Swing | ▲23.90 | |

=== Assembly Election 2004 ===
2004 Maharashtra Legislative Assembly election : Miraj
| Party | Candidate | Votes | % | ±% |
|---|---|---|---|---|
| INC | Dhatture Hafijabhai Husen | 45,181 | 32.17% | ▼8.73 |
| SS | Patil Bajrang Tukaram | 33,766 | 24.05% | ▼5.06 |
| Independent | Vithalrao Bhauso Patil(kakaji) | 20,580 | 14.66% | New |
| Independent | Shinde Padminidevi Mohanrao | 13,704 | 9.76% | New |
| Independent | Dhanapal Tatya Khot | 9,198 | 6.55% | New |
| JSS | Kurane Annasaheb Tammanna | 5,610 | 3.99% | New |
| BSP | Patil Kisan Dattatray | 3,140 | 2.24% | New |
| Independent | Bajarag (Bhau) Patil | 902 | 0.64% | New |
| Margin of victory | | 11,415 | 8.13% | ▼3.66 |
| Turnout | | 140,515 | 64.31% | ▲0.45 |
| Total valid votes | | 140,428 | | |
| Registered electors | | 218,485 | | ▲14.65 |
| INC hold | | Swing | ▼8.73 | |

=== Assembly Election 1999 ===
1999 Maharashtra Legislative Assembly election : Miraj
| Party | Candidate | Votes | % | ±% |
|---|---|---|---|---|
| INC | Dhatture Hafijabhai Husen | 47,294 | 40.90% | ▲23.56 |
| SS | Patil Bajrang Tukaram | 33,657 | 29.11% | ▲12.86 |
| JD(S) | Patil Sharad Ramgonda | 26,280 | 22.73% | New |
| Independent | Naikwadi Rasul Abdulasaheb | 7,584 | 6.56% | New |
| Independent | Shinde Gorakhanath Vitthal | 821 | 0.71% | New |
| Margin of victory | | 13,637 | 11.79% | ▼20.68 |
| Turnout | | 121,703 | 63.86% | ▼12.88 |
| Total valid votes | | 115,636 | | |
| Registered electors | | 190,573 | | ▲4.23 |
| INC gain from JD | | Swing | ▼8.91 | |

=== Assembly Election 1995 ===
1995 Maharashtra Legislative Assembly election : Miraj
| Party | Candidate | Votes | % | ±% |
|---|---|---|---|---|
| JD | Patil Sharad Ramgonda | 68,432 | 49.81% | ▲1.27 |
| INC | Gaikwad Maniktai Anandrao | 23,817 | 17.34% | ▼25.80 |
| SS | Patil Bajrang Tukaram | 22,326 | 16.25% | ▲10.42 |
| Independent | Jamdar Dadaso Ramchandra | 15,556 | 11.32% | New |
| Independent | Khan Jafar Ilahibax | 3,379 | 2.46% | New |
| Independent | Kotyan Gurudeo Bhimrao | 1,363 | 0.99% | New |
| BBM | Satarmaker Mustaka Sattar | 862 | 0.63% | New |
| Margin of victory | | 44,615 | 32.47% | ▲27.07 |
| Turnout | | 140,313 | 76.74% | ▲11.82 |
| Total valid votes | | 137,384 | | |
| Registered electors | | 182,845 | | ▲13.42 |
| JD hold | | Swing | ▲1.27 | |

=== Assembly Election 1990 ===
1990 Maharashtra Legislative Assembly election : Miraj
| Party | Candidate | Votes | % | ±% |
|---|---|---|---|---|
| JD | Patil Sharad Ramgonda | 50,014 | 48.54% | New |
| INC | Shinde Mohanrao Alias Ramsing Ganpatrao | 44,451 | 43.14% | ▼2.01 |
| SS | Katkar Appasaheb Santram | 6,004 | 5.83% | New |
| Independent | Khatavkar Ashok Kashinath | 2,208 | 2.14% | New |
| Margin of victory | | 5,563 | 5.40% | ▼12.48 |
| Turnout | | 104,661 | 64.92% | ▼4.49 |
| Total valid votes | | 103,045 | | |
| Registered electors | | 161,210 | | ▲35.15 |
| JD gain from INC | | Swing | ▲3.39 | |

=== Assembly Election 1985 ===
1985 Maharashtra Legislative Assembly election : Miraj
| Party | Candidate | Votes | % | ±% |
|---|---|---|---|---|
| INC | Shinde Mohanrao Alias Ramsing Ganpatrao | 36,815 | 45.15% | New |
| JP | Patil Sharad Ramgonda | 22,231 | 27.26% | New |
| Independent | Awati Devappa Dhulappa | 13,020 | 15.97% | New |
| Independent | Shaikh Anwar Sahebjan | 9,035 | 11.08% | New |
| Margin of victory | | 14,584 | 17.88% | ▼13.80 |
| Turnout | | 82,791 | 69.41% | ▲11.58 |
| Total valid votes | | 81,547 | | |
| Registered electors | | 119,283 | | ▲13.16 |
| INC gain from INC(I) | | Swing | ▼17.20 | |

=== Assembly Election 1980 ===
1980 Maharashtra Legislative Assembly election : Miraj
| Party | Candidate | Votes | % | ±% |
|---|---|---|---|---|
| INC(I) | Shinde Mohanrao Alias Ramsing Ganpatrao | 37,343 | 62.35% | ▲58.03 |
| Independent | Nagargoje Raghunath Ganpatrao | 18,367 | 30.67% | New |
| BJP | Kaulgud Vilas Pandurang | 4,183 | 6.98% | New |
| Margin of victory | | 18,976 | 31.68% | ▲1.72 |
| Turnout | | 60,953 | 57.83% | ▼17.38 |
| Total valid votes | | 59,893 | | |
| Registered electors | | 105,408 | | ▲10.27 |
| INC(I) gain from INC | | Swing | ▲1.93 | |

=== Assembly Election 1978 ===
1978 Maharashtra Legislative Assembly election : Miraj
| Party | Candidate | Votes | % | ±% |
|---|---|---|---|---|
| INC | Shinde Mohanrao Alias Ramsing Ganpatrao | 42,670 | 60.42% | ▲16.06 |
| JP | Naikwadi Iliyas Yusuf | 21,510 | 30.46% | New |
| INC(I) | Chivate Dhondiram Tawanappa | 3,049 | 4.32% | New |
| PWPI | Suryawanshi Bhagawanrao Dnyanadeo | 2,919 | 4.13% | New |
| Independent | Kolap Shivaram Sakharam | 474 | 0.67% | New |
| Margin of victory | | 21,160 | 29.96% | ▲19.11 |
| Turnout | | 71,893 | 75.21% | ▲0.11 |
| Total valid votes | | 70,622 | | |
| Registered electors | | 95,594 | | ▼4.12 |
| INC gain from Independent | | Swing | ▲5.21 | |

=== Assembly Election 1972 ===
1972 Maharashtra Legislative Assembly election : Miraj
| Party | Candidate | Votes | % | ±% |
|---|---|---|---|---|
| Independent | Narsinha R. Pathak | 40,388 | 55.21% | New |
| INC | Dadsaheb R. Jamadar | 32,451 | 44.36% | ▼7.79 |
| Margin of victory | | 7,937 | 10.85% | ▲5.14 |
| Turnout | | 74,874 | 75.10% | ▼2.45 |
| Total valid votes | | 73,147 | | |
| Registered electors | | 99,702 | | ▲28.64 |
| Independent gain from INC | | Swing | ▲3.06 | |

=== Assembly Election 1967 ===
1967 Maharashtra Legislative Assembly election : Miraj
| Party | Candidate | Votes | % | ±% |
|---|---|---|---|---|
| INC | Gundu Dasharath Patil | 29,853 | 52.15% | ▼22.61 |
| Independent | N. R. Pathak | 26,586 | 46.44% | New |
| ABJS | H. N. Baraale | 358 | 0.63% | New |
| Margin of victory | | 3,267 | 5.71% | ▼57.74 |
| Turnout | | 60,107 | 77.55% | ▲4.98 |
| Total valid votes | | 57,246 | | |
| Registered electors | | 77,503 | | ▲0.37 |
| INC hold | | Swing | ▼22.61 | |

=== Assembly Election 1962 ===
1962 Maharashtra Legislative Assembly election : Miraj
| Party | Candidate | Votes | % | ±% |
|---|---|---|---|---|
| INC | Gundu Dasharath Patil | 39,921 | 74.76% | ▲13.85 |
| CPI | Nivrutti Baburao Kalke | 6,041 | 11.31% | New |
| PSP | Ganapat Krishnaji Malavade | 3,568 | 6.68% | New |
| Independent | Jagaunda Kalgaunda Patil | 1,983 | 3.71% | New |
| ABJS | Anandrao Bapusaheb Shinde | 1,883 | 3.53% | New |
| Margin of victory | | 33,880 | 63.45% | ▲36.31 |
| Turnout | | 56,035 | 72.57% | ▲11.22 |
| Total valid votes | | 53,396 | | |
| Registered electors | | 77,215 | | ▲25.30 |
| INC hold | | Swing | ▲13.85 | |

=== Assembly Election 1957 ===
1957 Bombay State Legislative Assembly election : Miraj
| Party | Candidate | Votes | % | ±% |
|---|---|---|---|---|
| INC | Patil Gundu Dasharath | 23,029 | 60.91% | ▲2.86 |
| SCF | Kolap Shivram Sakharam | 12,768 | 33.77% | New |
| Independent | Waghmode Dnyandev Tatyarao | 762 | 2.02% | New |
| Independent | Kadlaskar Hasham Karim | 727 | 1.92% | New |
| Independent | Sanmukh Ramkrishna Vithoba | 522 | 1.38% | New |
| Margin of victory | | 10,261 | 27.14% | ▼13.08 |
| Turnout | | 37,808 | 61.35% | ▼0.43 |
| Total valid votes | | 37,808 | | |
| Registered electors | | 61,623 | | ▲8.99 |
| INC hold | | Swing | ▲2.86 | |

=== Assembly Election 1952 ===
1952 Bombay State Legislative Assembly election : Miraj
| Party | Candidate | Votes | % | ±% |
|---|---|---|---|---|
| INC | Kalantre Shrimatibai Charudatta | 20,276 | 58.05% | New |
| Socialist | Mali Dhondiram Tukaram | 6,229 | 17.83% | New |
| Independent | Pawar Mahadeo Ishwar | 4,608 | 13.19% | New |
| KMPP | Kachi A. Shakur H. Ali Mahammad | 2,338 | 6.69% | New |
| Independent | Chivate Balasaheb Alias Dhondi Ram Tukaram | 1,478 | 4.23% | New |
| Margin of victory | | 14,047 | 40.22% | |
| Turnout | | 34,929 | 61.78% | |
| Total valid votes | | 34,929 | | |
| Registered electors | | 56,542 | | |
| INC win (new seat) | | | | |

== Overview ==
Miraj constituency is one of the eight Vidhan Sabha constituencies located in the Sangli district. Miraj Assembly constituency is part of the Sangli Lok Sabha constituency along with five other Vidhan Sabha segments in this district, namely Khanapur, Sangli, Palus-Kadegaon, Tasgao-Kavathemahakal and Jat.

== See also ==
- Miraj
- List of constituencies of Maharashtra Vidhan Sabha
