= Pandurang Bapu Patil =

Indian politician and educationist (1932–2014)

- Born: 14 January 1932; Chikurde, Tal. Walwa, Sangli District, Maharashtra
- Died: 23 February 2014 (aged 82); Sangli, Maharashtra
- Education: Rajaram College, University of Pune
- Occupation: Educationist
- Years active: 1952–2014
- Known for: Reform in Education and Rural Development in Maharashtra, founder of Navbharat Shikshan Mandal (Shantiniketan Lokvidyapeeth), Sangli and P.B.Patil Committee for Panchayati Raj Evaluation.
- Notable work: P.B.Patil Committee for Panchayat Raj Evaluation by the Government of Maharashtra
- Political party: Indian National Congress
- Spouse: Sarojini Patil
- Children: 4, Geeta, Goutam, Nandini and Shivaji
- Parent: Bapu Shivaba Patil (father) Jijabai Bapu Patil (mother)

Member of Legislative Assembly of Maharashtra State

Prin. Dr. P. B. Patil (born Pandurang Bapu Patil, 14 January 1932 – 23 February 2014) was a member of the Sangli Assembly constituency of the Maharashtra Legislative Assembly (1972-1978), a social reformer who worked for the cause of education and rural development in Maharashtra, India. He was born in a small farmer's family in Chikurde village of Walwa Taluka in Sangli district, Maharashtra, India.

== Biography ==
Patil completed his primary education in his own village, and secondary education at district and taluka towns. He completed his higher education at Kolhapur at Rajaram College. He won first prizes in inter-colleges debating competitions in South Maharashtra. He organized students' cultural troupe (Kalapathak) to propagate the importance of education among masses through the medium of these cultural troupes. In 1955–56, Patil joined the Bhoodan Movement.

In 1957, he pursued M.A. in Political Science and Economics from the University of Pune. He then pursued the course in Higher Rural Organisation at the Training Centre, run by UNESCO in Ceylon in 1958.

He further completed post-graduate course in Community Development and Extension in the University of London, U.K, in 1960–61.

== Educational initiatives ==
In 1952, he founded a residential hostel for poor students at Islampur, Sangli district in the state of Maharashtra at the behest of Acharya Jawadekar. Today, as part of Acharya Gurukul High School, it serves many students with the accommodation facilities to pursue their educational endeavors.

Patil founded Navbharat Shikshan Mandal (Shantiniketan Lokvidyapeeth), Sangli, Acharya Jawadekar, Padmabhushan J.P. Naik, Lt. Gen. S.P.P.Thorat (Retd.), Padmabhushan Vasantdada Patil (Ex. Chief Minister of Maharashtra), Shri Y.B.Chavan (Ex. Dy. Prime Minister of India) and many others notable personalities supported Navbharat Shikshan Mandal. The institute has the capacity to provide school and college education to 5,000 students through its five centres.

== Work as an educationist ==
He worked as a lecturer at Mouni Vidyapeeth, Gargoti. In 1962, he took the responsibility of heading as a Principal of Panchayat Raj Training Centre, Sangli. In 1969, he became the Principal of the Shantiniketan Mahavidyalaya, Sangli.

The P.B.Patil Committee was constituted by the government of Maharashtra for the evaluation of the Panchayat Raj system in 1984. The committee emphasized involving people and gave 184 recommendations for reforming the system and enabling greater participation.

== Political career ==
In 1972, Dr. Patil was elected as a Member of Legislative Assembly, representing Indian National Congress from Sangli constituency with a large majority. He served as MLA for six years. He chaired the position of General Secretary of Maharashtra Legislative Assembly, Congress Party from 1972 to 1976. He was also a member of AICC (All India Congress Committee) from 1972 to 1990. Having a status of a State Minister, he also served as the Chairman of Panchayat Raj Evaluation Committee, Maharashtra. Patil also worked as a General Secretary of Maharashtra Pradesh Congress Committee for six years from 1972 to 1978.

== Writings ==
- Samaj Parivartan (Vaicharik Lekh Sangrah), Marathi Language
- Kaal Pradakshina (Kavya Sangraha), Marathi Language
- Krantisagar (Novel), Marathi Language
- Navegaon Andolan (Informative Book), Marathi Language
- Vichardhan - Jan-Gan-Man, Marathi Language
- Ballad (Indirecha Powada, Marathi) on prohibition of child-marriage
- Lavani on the characteristics of Kolhapur

== Publications after death ==
- Poems of Prin. Dr. P.B.Patil
- Shivshahi te Peshwai (Vyakhyanmala), lecture series in Marathi
- Contributions to the book 'The Journey of Maharashtra Congress (1947-2000) by Dr. Dinakar Vishnu Patil.

== Famous speeches ==
- Nave Gaon Andolan
- Shivshahi Te Peshwai
- Shikshan, Sahakar, Panchayat Rajya, Rural Development, Traditional Culture, etc.
- Interview on Historian Vasudev Sitaram Bendrey's work

== Awards and honours ==
Dr. Patil was bestowed with Platinum Jubilee Endowment Trust Award in 2000 from Indian Merchant Chamber for his work in the Panchayat Raj Committee. He was also honoured with the prestigious D. Litt Award 2002 by Shri Shivaji Lokvidyapeeth, Amaravati for his contributions to the Panchayat Raj Rural Development and Education. He was bestowed with the prestigious Maratha Bhushan Puraskar, Islampur, and Jeevan Gaurav Puraskar, Solapur in 2013. In the same year, he was conferred with the esteemed Rajarshi Shahu Puraskar, Kolhapur. He last received Sangli Bhushan Puraskar in 2014.
