= Suresh Khade =

Indian politician and Maharashtra Cabinet Minister

Minister of Labour Government of Maharashtra
- In office 9 August 2022 – 26 November 2024
- Chief Minister: Eknath Shinde
- Preceded by: Hasan Mushrif

Minister of Social Justice Government of Maharashtra
- In office 16 June 2019 – 12 November 2019
- Chief Minister: Devendra Fadnavis
- Preceded by: Rajkumar Badole
- Succeeded by: Dhananjay Munde

Member of the Maharashtra Legislative Assembly
- Incumbent
- Assumed office 2009
- Preceded by: Hafizabhai Dhatture
- Constituency: Miraj
- In office 2004–2009
- Preceded by: Umaji Sanamadikar
- Succeeded by: Prakash Shendge
- Constituency: Jat

Personal details
- Born: Sureshbhau Dagadu Khade; 1 June 1958 (age 67) Tasgaon, Sangli district
- Party: Bharatiya Janata Party
- Occupation: Farmer

Sureshbhau Dagadu Khade is an Indian politician. He is incumbent Cabinet Minister in Government of Maharashtra in Eknath Shinde ministry. He is Labour Minister of Maharashtra and Guardian Minister of Sangli district. He was elected to the Maharashtra Legislative Assembly from Miraj, Maharashtra in the 2019 Maharashtra Legislative Assembly election as a member of the Bharatiya Janata Party. He is four term member of Maharashtra Legislative Assembly. He was Minister of Social Justice in Devendra Fadnavis cabinet.
