= Sambhaji Pawar =

Indian politician (1941–2021)

- Died: 15 March 2021 (aged 79–80); Sangli, India

Sambhaji Pawar (1941 – 15 March 2021) was a member of the Sangli Assembly constituency of Maharashtra and is a member of the Bharatiya Janata Party.

== Positions held ==
- 1986: Elected Bypoll to Maharashtra Legislative Assembly - Janata Dal
- 1990: Elected to Maharashtra Legislative Assembly - Janata Dal
- 1995: Elected to Maharashtra Legislative Assembly - Janata Dal
- 2009: Elected to Maharashtra Legislative Assembly - Bharatiya Janata Party
