= Vishwajeet Kadam =

Indian politician

Dr. Vishwajeet Kadam
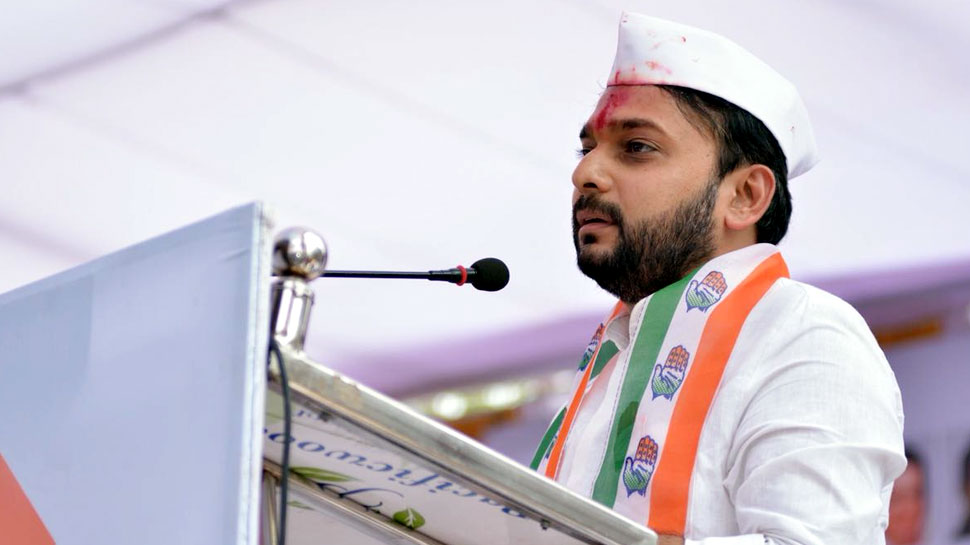

Minister of State Government of Maharashtra
- In office 30 December 2019 – 29 June 2022
- Minister: Co-operation; Agriculture; Social Justice; Food, Civil Supplies; Consumer Affairs; Minority Development and Aukaf; Marathi Language.; Finance Additional charge on 27 June 2022; Planning Additional charge on 27 June 2022; Skill Development And Entrepreneurship Additional charge on 27 June 2022; Marketing Additional charge on 27 June 2022; Public Health and Family Welfare Additional charge on 27 June 2022
- Governor: Bhagat Singh Koshyari
- Chief Minister: Uddhav Thackeray
- Deputy CM: Ajit Pawar

Member of the Maharashtra Legislative Assembly
- Incumbent
- Assumed office 31 May 2018
- Preceded by: Patangrao Kadam
- Constituency: Palus-Kadegaon

Personal details
- Born: 13 January 1980 (age 46) Pune, Maharashtra, India
- Party: Indian National Congress
- Parent: Patangrao Kadam
- Website: https://vishwajeetkadam.in

Vishwajeet Kadam (born 13 January 1980) is a politician from the Indian state of Maharashtra. He is the son of former congress leader Patangrao Kadam, and was born and brought up in Pune. He serves as a member of Maharashtra legislative assembly from Palus-Kadegaon (Vidhan Sabha constituency).

== Early life and education ==
Kadam has a B.E., MBA, PhD in Management and has also completed Management and Leadership in Education from Howard University.

Some know him as the Working President of Maharashtra Pradesh Congress Committee. Others know him as a Member of the AICTE (All India Council for Technical Education) and many more know him as the Secretary of Bharati Vidyapeeth.

== Political career ==
His was selected as the Congress party candidate for 2019 Maharashtra Legislative Assembly election which he won by a huge margin of 1,50,866 votes from Palus-Kadegaon (Vidhan Sabha constituency).

=== Positions held ===
- Maharashtra Cabinet Minister of State (2019–2022)
