= Patangrao Kadam =

Indian politician (1944–2018)

Cabinet Minister Government of Maharashtra
- In office 11 November 2010 – 26 September 2014
- Minister: Forest
- Governor: K. Sankaranarayanan; Om Prakash Kohli; C. Vidyasagar Rao
- Chief Minister: Prithviraj Chavan
- Dy Chief Minister: Ajit Pawar
- Guardian Minister: Jalna District; Osmanabad District
- Preceded by: Himself
- Succeeded by: Sudhir Mungantiwar

Cabinet Minister Government of Maharashtra
- In office 07 November 2009 – 09 November 2010
- Minister: Forest
- Governor: S. C. Jamir; K. Sankaranarayanan
- Chief Minister: Ashok Chavan
- Dy Chief Minister: Chhagan Bhujbal
- Guardian Minister: Sangli District
- Preceded by: Babanrao Pachpute
- Succeeded by: Himself

Cabinet Minister Government of Maharashtra
- In office 08 December 2008 – 06 November 2009
- Minister: Revenue; Sports and Youth Welfare
- Governor: S. C. Jamir
- Chief Minister: Ashok Chavan
- Dy Chief Minister: Chhagan Bhujbal
- Guardian Minister: Sangli District; Washim District
- Preceded by: Narayan Rane (Revenue); Vasant Purke (Sports and Youth Welfare)
- Succeeded by: Narayan Rane (Revenue); Suresh Shetty (Sports and Youth Welfare)

Cabinet Minister Government of Maharashtra
- In office 09 November 2004 – 01 December 2008
- Minister: Earthquake Rehabilitation; Co-operation; Skill Development Entrepreneurship; Fisheries; Ports Development; Other Backward Bahujan Welfare
- Governor: Mohammed Fazal; S. M. Krishna; S. C. Jamir
- Chief Minister: Vilasrao Deshmukh
- Dy Chief Minister: R. R. Patil
- Guardian Minister: Gondia District; Kolhapur District
- Preceded by: Vilasrao Deshmukh (Earthquake Rehabilitation); Vilasrao Deshmukh (Co-operation); Vilasrao Deshmukh (Skill Development Entrepreneurship); Vilasrao Deshmukh (Fisheries); Vilasrao Deshmukh (Ports Development); Vilasrao Deshmukh (Other Backward Bahujan Welfare)
- Succeeded by: Babanrao Pachpute (Earthquake Rehabilitation); Harshvardhan Patil (Co-operation); R. R. Patil (Skill Development Entrepreneurship); Ravisheth Patil (Fisheries); Ravisheth Patil (Ports Development); Surupsingh Hirya Naik (Other Backward Bahujan Welfare)

Cabinet Minister Government of Maharashtra
- In office 18 January 2003 – 01 November 2004
- Minister: Energy; New and Renewable Energy
- Governor: Mohammed Fazal
- Chief Minister: Sushilkumar Shinde
- Dy Chief Minister: Chhagan Bhujbal; Vijaysingh Mohite-Patil
- Guardian Minister: Thane District; Gadchiroli District; Beed District
- Preceded by: Padamsinh Bajirao Patil (Energy); Padamsinh Bajirao Patil (New and Renewable Energy)
- Succeeded by: Vilasrao Deshmukh (Energy); Vilasrao Deshmukh (New and Renewable Energy)

Cabinet Minister Government of Maharashtra
- In office 19 October 1999 – 16 January 2003
- Minister: Industries; Mining Department; Soil and Water Conservation (19 October 1999 – 02 March 2001)
- Governor: P. C. Alexander; Mohammed Fazal
- Chief Minister: Vilasrao Deshmukh
- Dy Chief Minister: Chhagan Bhujbal
- Guardian Minister: Nagpur District; Sangli District
- Preceded by: Nitin Gadkari (Industries); Liladhar Dake (Mining Department); Sureshdada Jain (Soil and Water Conservation)
- Succeeded by: Ashok Chavan (Industries); Vasant Chavan (Mining Department); Padamsinh Bajirao Patil (Soil and Water Conservation)

Leader of The House Maharashtra Legislative Council
- In office 08 December 2008 – 07 November 2009
- Governor: S. C. Jamir
- Chairman of the House: Shivajirao Deshmukh
- Chief Minister: Ashok Chavan
- Dy Chief Minister: Chhagan Bhujbal
- Deputy Leader: Radhakrishna Vikhe Patil
- Preceded by: R. R. Patil
- Succeeded by: Chhagan Bhujbal
- In office 18 October 1999 – 16 January 2003
- Governor: Mohammed Fazal; S. M. Krishna; S. C. Jamir
- Chairman of the House: N. S. Pharande
- Chief Minister: Vilasrao Deshmukh
- Dy Chief Minister: Chhagan Bhujbal
- Deputy Leader: Ranjeet Deshmukh
- Preceded by: Sudhir Joshi
- Succeeded by: Ranjeet Deshmukh

Member of the Maharashtra Legislative Assembly
- In office (2009-2014), (2014 – 2018)
- Succeeded by: Vishwajeet Patangrao Kadam
- Constituency: Palus-Kadegaon (Vidhan Sabha constituency)
- In office (1985-1990), (1990-1995), (1999-2004), (2004 – 2009)
- Preceded by: Sampatrao Annasaheb Chavan
- Constituency: Bhilwadi Wangi Assembly constituency

Personal details
- Born: 8 January 1944 Sonsal Village, Tal: Kadegaon, Sangli, (Bombay Presidency), (British India)
- Died: 9 March 2018 (aged 74) Mumbai, Maharashtra, India
- Party: Indian National Congress (INC)
- Children: Vishwajeet Kadam; Late Abhijeet Kadam; Asmita Jagtap; Bharati Lad

Patangrao Shripatrao Kadam (8 January 1944 – 9 March 2018) was an Indian politician from the state of Maharashtra. He came from a middle level farmer family in a small village, Sonsal in Sangli district. He previously held the forest ministry in the Maharashtra government. He was also an educationist and was the founder of Bharati Vidyapeeth. Kadam died of renal dysfunction at Mumbai's Lilavati Hospital on 9 March 2018.

== Early life ==
Patangrao Kadam was born into a middle-level farming family in a small village of Sonsal, Sangli District in Maharashtra. Since no educational facilities were available in Sonsal, Kadam had to walk 4–5 km every day to attend a primary school in a nearby village. He did his secondary education up to S.S.C. at a boarding school in Kundal.

Kadam was the first person from his village to have passed the S.S.C. examination. After S.S.C., he joined Shivaji College, Satara, run by Rayat Shikshan Sanstha, which was established by a renowned social reformer and educationist, Karmaveer Bhaurao Patil. He was enrolled in the College under its "earn and learn scheme". He took lessons of dedicated social service from Karmaveer Bhaurao Patil.

Kadam came to Pune in 1961, where he completed a one-year Diploma Course in teaching in 1962, and started working as a part-time teacher in a secondary school in Pune run by Rayat Shikshan Sanstha. Kadam obtained a bachelor's degree in Law and master's degree from the University of Pune. Despite his preoccupation with educational, social and political activities, Kadam completed his research on the theme "Administrative Problems of Educational Administration in 80s" for which he was awarded a Ph.D. in Management by the University of Pune. He has also established Milk Society, Spinning Mills, Sugar Factories, a Bank etc.

== Political career ==
- June 1991 - May 1992 - Minister of State for Education
- May 1992 - 1995 - Education Minister (Independent Charge)
- October 1999 to October 2004 - Cabinet Minister for Industry, Trade, Commerce and Parliamentary Affairs
- November 2004 onwards - Minister of State for Rehabilitation and Relief Works
- Acting President - Maharashtra Pradesh Congress Committee
- Maharashtra State Road Transport Corporation (MSRTC) Chairman
- December 2008 - Cabinet Minister, Government of Maharashtra - Revenue, Rehabilitation and Relief, Earthquake Rehabilitation and School Education
- March 2009 onwards - Cabinet Minister, Revenue Accounts, Government of Maharashtra
- November 2009 onwards - Cabinet Minister, Government of Maharashtra - Forest Department
- November 2010 to 2014 - Cabinet Minister, State of Maharashtra - Department of Forests, Rehabilitation and Relief, Earthquake Rehabilitation

== Death ==
After prolonged illness caused by renal dysfunction, Patangrao died at Mumbai's Lilavati Hospital on 9 March 2018.
