= Prakashbapu Vasantdada Patil =

Indian politician

Member of Parliament, Lok Sabha
- In office 6 October 1999 — 21 October 2005
- Preceded by: Madan Patil
- Succeeded by: Pratik Patil
- Constituency: Sangli (Lok Sabha constituency)
- In office 1984–1996
- Preceded by: Vasantdada Patil
- Succeeded by: Madan Patil
- Constituency: Sangli (Lok Sabha constituency)

Personal details
- Born: 21 June 1947 Sangli, Sangli State, British Raj
- Died: 21 October 2005 (aged 58) Sangli, Maharashtra, India
- Political party: INC
- Spouse: Shailaja Patil
- Children: Pratik Prakashbapu Patil, Vishal Patil and one daughter
- Parents: Vasantdada Patil (father); Malati Tai Patil (mother)
- As of 16 September, 2006

Prakashbapu Vasantdada Patil (21 June 1947 – 21 October 2005) represented Sangli in the 8th, 9th, 10th, 13th, and 14th Lok Sabha of India. He also represented the Sangli constituency of Maharashtra and was a member of the Indian National Congress (INC) political party.

He was married to Shailaja Patil and died in October 2005.

Following his death, his son Pratik Patil won the by-poll. After Pratik announced his retirement from politics, his elder brother, Prakashbapu Patil's second child Vishal Patil, was a Swabhimani Shetkari Saghtana candidate to represent the Sangli Lok Sabha constituency in the 2019 Lok Sabha election. He was defeated by BJP candidate Sanjay Patil.
