= Sangli Assembly constituency =

Constituency of the Maharashtra legislative assembly in India

Coordinates: 16.86°N 74.61°E

Sangli
- Constituency No. 282 for the Maharashtra Legislative Assembly

Constituency details
- Country: India
- Region: Western India
- State: Maharashtra
- District: Sangli
- Lok Sabha constituency: Sangli
- Established: 1952
- Total electors: 356,664
- Reservation: None

Member of Legislative Assembly
- 15th Maharashtra Legislative Assembly
- Incumbent Sudhir Gadgil
- Party: Bharatiya Janata Party
- Elected year: 2024

Sangli Assembly constituency is one of the 288 Vidhan Sabha (legislative assembly) constituencies of Maharashtra state in western India.

== Overview ==
Sangli constituency is one of the eight Vidhan Sabha constituencies located in Sangli district.

Sangli is part of Sangli Lok Sabha constituency along with five other Vidhan Sabha constituencies in this district, namely Miraj, Khanapur, Palus-Kadegaon, Tasgao-Kavathemahakal and Jat.

== Members of the Legislative Assembly ==
Election	Member	Party
1952	Vasantrao Banduji Patil	Indian National Congress
1957	Vasantrao Banduji Patil	Indian National Congress
1962	Vasantrao Banduji Patil	Indian National Congress
1967	A. B. Birnale	Indian National Congress
1972	Pandurang Bapu Patil	Indian National Congress
1978	Vasantrao Banduji Patil	Indian National Congress
1980	Shalini Patil	Indian National Congress
1985	Vasantrao Banduji Patil	Indian National Congress
1986 By-election	Sambhaji Pawar	Janata Party
1990	Sambhaji Pawar	Janata Dal
1995	Sambhaji Pawar	Janata Dal
1999	Patil Dinkar Tukaram	Indian National Congress
2004	Madan Vishwanathrao Patil	Independent politician
2009	Sambhaji Pawar	Bharatiya Janata Party
2014	Dhananjay Alias Sudhir Hari Gadgil	Bharatiya Janata Party
2019	Dhananjay Alias Sudhir Hari Gadgil	Bharatiya Janata Party
2024	Dhananjay Alias Sudhir Hari Gadgil	Bharatiya Janata Party

== Election results ==
=== Assembly Election 2024 ===
2024 Maharashtra Legislative Assembly election : Sangli
Party	Candidate	Votes	%	±%
BJP	Dhananjay Alias Sudhir Hari Gadgil	112,498	50.03%	▼0.25
INC	Prithviraj (Baba) Gulabrao Patil	76,363	33.96%	▼12.59
Independent	Jayashree Madan Patil	32,736	14.56%	New
NOTA	None of the above	1,224	0.54%	▼0.77
Margin of victory		36,135	16.07%	▲12.34
Turnout		226,065	63.38%	▲5.09
Total valid votes		224,841		
Registered electors		356,664		▲10.01
BJP hold		Swing	▼0.25	

=== Assembly Election 2019 ===
2019 Maharashtra Legislative Assembly election : Sangli
Party	Candidate	Votes	%	±%
BJP	Dhananjay Alias Sudhir Hari Gadgil	93,636	50.28%	▲8.82
INC	Prithviraj Gulabrao Patil	86,697	46.55%	▲12.54
NOTA	None of the above	2,448	1.31%	▲0.64
Independent	Shekhar Vishwas Mane	1,739	0.93%	New
BSP	Suresh Tukaram Saratikar	1,301	0.70%	▲0.06
Margin of victory		6,939	3.73%	▼3.72
Turnout		188,988	58.29%	▼1.34
Total valid votes		186,235		
Registered electors		324,197		▼1.36
BJP hold		Swing	▲8.82	

=== Assembly Election 2014 ===
2014 Maharashtra Legislative Assembly election : Sangli
Party	Candidate	Votes	%	±%
BJP	Dhananjay Alias Sudhir Hari Gadgil	80,497	41.46%	▼3.87
INC	Madan Vishwanath Patil	66,040	34.01%	▼4.78
SS	Pawar Pruthviraj Sambhaji	34,635	17.84%	New
NCP	Patil Suresh Adgonda	4,718	2.43%	New
MNS	Adv. Swati Nitin Shinde	1,440	0.74%	▼2.54
Independent	Kurane Munna Bandu	1,354	0.70%	New
NOTA	None of the above	1,296	0.67%	New
BSP	Pawar Sachin Baban	1,249	0.64%	▼0.22
Margin of victory		14,457	7.45%	▲0.91
Turnout		195,986	59.63%	▲0.86
Total valid votes		194,173		
Registered electors		328,663		▲13.10
BJP hold		Swing	▼3.87	

=== Assembly Election 2009 ===
2009 Maharashtra Legislative Assembly election : Sangli
Party	Candidate	Votes	%	±%
BJP	Sambhaji Pawar	77,404	45.33%	▲18.10
INC	Madan Vishwanath Patil	66,240	38.79%	▲13.78
Independent	Kamlakar Bhimrao Patil	6,783	3.97%	New
JD(S)	Prof. Sharad Patil	6,660	3.90%	New
MNS	Nitin Vishwasrao Shinde	5,602	3.28%	New
Independent	Shamu Patel	5,166	3.03%	New
BSP	Suresh Tukaram Saratikar	1,467	0.86%	▲0.16
Margin of victory		11,164	6.54%	▼11.78
Turnout		170,783	58.77%	▼12.02
Total valid votes		170,744		
Registered electors		290,587		▲40.74
BJP gain from Independent		Swing	▼0.22	

=== Assembly Election 2004 ===
2004 Maharashtra Legislative Assembly election : Sangli
Party	Candidate	Votes	%	±%
Independent	Madan Vishwanathrao Patil	66,563	45.55%	New
BJP	Sambhaji Pawar	39,796	27.23%	▲11.37
INC	Dinkar Tukaram Patil	36,552	25.01%	▼26.65
BSP	Moulavi Mubarak Sayyad	1,022	0.70%	New
Margin of victory		26,767	18.32%	▼2.83
Turnout		146,155	70.79%	▲9.98
Total valid votes		146,129		
Registered electors		206,469		▲9.86
Independent gain from INC		Swing	▼6.11	

=== Assembly Election 1999 ===
1999 Maharashtra Legislative Assembly election : Sangli
Party	Candidate	Votes	%	±%
INC	Patil Dinkar Tukaram	56,573	51.66%	▲23.50
JD(S)	Sambhaji Pawar	33,415	30.51%	New
BJP	Kelkar Nita Shrirang	17,375	15.86%	▲6.14
Independent	Patil Anil Adgonda	1,223	1.12%	New
CPI(M)	Com. Shankar Lakhu Pujari	932	0.85%	New
Margin of victory		23,158	21.15%	▲12.76
Turnout		114,284	60.81%	▼17.66
Total valid votes		109,518		
Registered electors		187,945		▲3.58
INC gain from JD		Swing	▲15.11	

=== Assembly Election 1995 ===
1995 Maharashtra Legislative Assembly election : Sangli
Party	Candidate	Votes	%	±%
JD	Sambhaji Pawar	51,283	36.55%	▼16.56
INC	Patil Prakashbapu Vasantrao	39,516	28.16%	▼16.21
Independent	Madan Vishwanathrao Patil	27,064	19.29%	New
BJP	Kelkar Neeta Shrirang	13,642	9.72%	▲7.88
Independent	Mohite Namdeorao Ganaptrao	6,678	4.76%	New
BBM	Sabale Mohan Pandurang	1,556	1.11%	New
Margin of victory		11,767	8.39%	▼0.35
Turnout		142,385	78.47%	▲8.27
Total valid votes		140,311		
Registered electors		181,457		▲9.75
JD hold		Swing	▼16.56	

=== Assembly Election 1990 ===
1990 Maharashtra Legislative Assembly election : Sangli
Party	Candidate	Votes	%	±%
JD	Sambhaji Pawar	60,856	53.11%	New
INC	Patil Vishwanath Shamrao	50,843	44.37%	▼2.61
BJP	Galgale Laxaman Vinayak	2,106	1.84%	New
BRP	Kamble Ganesh Appa	733	0.64%	New
Margin of victory		10,013	8.74%	▲5.14
Turnout		116,063	70.20%	
Total valid votes		114,592		
Registered electors		165,343		
JD gain from JP		Swing	▲2.53	

=== Assembly By-election 1986 ===
1986 Maharashtra Legislative Assembly by-election : Sangli
Party	Candidate	Votes	%	±%
JP	Sambhaji Pawar	36,977	50.58%	New
INC	P. V. Shamrao	34,346	46.98%	▼22.08
Independent	K. R. Kamble	742	1.01%	New
Independent	C. J. Ganapati	641	0.88%	New
Margin of victory		2,631	3.60%	▼35.97
Total valid votes		73,107		
JP gain from INC		Swing	▼18.48	

=== Assembly Election 1985 ===
1985 Maharashtra Legislative Assembly election : Sangli
Party	Candidate	Votes	%	±%
INC	Vasantrao Banduji Patil	51,636	69.06%	New
IC(S)	Pailwan Mohite Namdrao Ganapati	22,051	29.49%	New
Independent	Kamble Yallapa Dhondiram	806	1.08%	New
Margin of victory		29,585	39.57%	▼4.49
Turnout		75,976	62.86%	▲1.22
Total valid votes		74,766		
Registered electors		120,860		▲9.19
INC gain from INC(I)		Swing	▲2.93	

=== Assembly Election 1980 ===
1980 Maharashtra Legislative Assembly election : Sangli
Party	Candidate	Votes	%	±%
INC(I)	Shalini Patil	44,341	66.13%	▲59.38
INC(U)	Pailwan Mohite Namdrao Ganapati	14,799	22.07%	New
BJP	Galgale Laxaman Vinayak	7,071	10.55%	New
Margin of victory		29,542	44.06%	▲6.02
Turnout		68,223	61.64%	▼14.81
Total valid votes		67,049		
Registered electors		110,683		▲10.43
INC(I) gain from INC		Swing	▲1.18	

=== Assembly Election 1978 ===
1978 Maharashtra Legislative Assembly election : Sangli
Party	Candidate	Votes	%	±%
INC	Vasantrao Banduji Patil	48,762	64.95%	▼17.41
JP	Khot Bharamgonda Apuraya	20,204	26.91%	New
INC(I)	Shaikh Yusuf Umar	5,068	6.75%	New
Independent	Nevarekar Chandra Sakharam	702	0.94%	New
Margin of victory		28,558	38.04%	▼34.96
Turnout		76,624	76.45%	▲9.76
Total valid votes		75,071		
Registered electors		100,225		▼2.71
INC hold		Swing	▼17.41	

=== Assembly Election 1972 ===
1972 Maharashtra Legislative Assembly election : Sangli
Party	Candidate	Votes	%	±%
INC	Pandurang Bapu Patil	55,176	82.36%	▲28.09
ABJS	Pawar Pandit Shivaji	6,272	9.36%	New
PWPI	Shivajirao R. Shedbale	5,546	8.28%	New
Margin of victory		48,904	73.00%	▲64.47
Turnout		68,703	66.69%	▼10.26
Total valid votes		66,994		
Registered electors		103,017		▲25.49
INC hold		Swing	▲28.09	

=== Assembly Election 1967 ===
1967 Maharashtra Legislative Assembly election : Sangli
Party	Candidate	Votes	%	±%
INC	A. B. Birnale	32,966	54.27%	▼18.22
Independent	K. A. Chougule	27,784	45.73%	New
Margin of victory		5,182	8.53%	▼52.96
Turnout		63,166	76.95%	▼1.53
Total valid votes		60,750		
Registered electors		82,090		▼1.98
INC hold		Swing	▼18.22	

=== Assembly Election 1962 ===
1962 Maharashtra Legislative Assembly election : Sangli
Party	Candidate	Votes	%	±%
INC	Vasantrao Banduji Patil	45,672	72.49%	▲10.21
PWPI	Bhagwan Dnyandev Suryavanshi	6,933	11.00%	New
PSP	Bharamgonda Appuraya Khot	6,178	9.81%	New
ABJS	Ram Bandu Sawant	2,980	4.73%	New
Independent	Rasul Farid Mujawar	1,241	1.97%	New
Margin of victory		38,739	61.49%	▲33.17
Turnout		65,720	78.48%	▲2.27
Total valid votes		63,004		
Registered electors		83,746		▲26.68
INC hold		Swing	▲10.21	

=== Assembly Election 1957 ===
1957 Bombay State Legislative Assembly election : Sangli
Party	Candidate	Votes	%	±%
INC	Vasantrao Banduji Patil	31,375	62.28%	▼8.67
ABJS	Godbole Madhav Hari	17,109	33.96%	New
Independent	Kadlaskar Hasham Karim	1,895	3.76%	New
Margin of victory		14,266	28.32%	▼20.81
Turnout		50,379	76.21%	▲11.15
Total valid votes		50,379		
Registered electors		66,106		▲24.15
INC hold		Swing	▼8.67	

=== Assembly Election 1952 ===
1952 Bombay State Legislative Assembly election : Sangli
Party	Candidate	Votes	%	±%
INC	Vasantrao Banduji Patil	24,579	70.95%	New
Socialist	Devarshi Anna Baburao	7,559	21.82%	New
Independent	Thorat Dhondiram Ramchandra	1,585	4.58%	New
Independent	Kadlaskar Hasham Karim	919	2.65%	New
Margin of victory		17,020	49.13%	
Turnout		34,642	65.06%	
Total valid votes		34,642		
Registered electors		53,246		
INC win (new seat)				

== See also ==
- Sangli
- List of constituencies of Maharashtra Vidhan Sabha
