= Sanjaykaka Patil =

Indian politician

Member of Parliament, Lok Sabha
- In office 16 May 2014 – 4 June 2024
- Preceded by: Pratik Patil
- Succeeded by: Vishal Patil
- Constituency: Sangli Lok Sabha constituency

Member of Maharashtra Legislative Council
- In office 25 April 2008 – 24 April 2014
- Constituency: elected by Legislative Assembly members

Personal details
- Born: 4 January 1965 (age 61) Chinchani, Sangli District, Maharashtra
- Party: Nationalist Congress Party (Oct 2024-Present)
- Other political affiliations: Nationalist Congress Party (Before 2014); Bhartiya Janta Party (Before 2024)
- Spouse: Jyoti Patil (m. 1993)
- Children: Prabhakar Sanjaykaka Patil & 1 daughter
- Parent(s): Ramchandra Krishnaji Patil, Vaijanta

Sanjay Ramchandra Patil is a politician from Tasgaon of Sangli district of Maharashtra state in India.

== Biography ==
He was member of Legislative Council of Maharashtra from Nationalist Congress Party (NCP). He is present Member of Parliament for Sangli Lok Sabha constituency. He was competing with NCP Leader R. R. Patil for Tasgaon-Kavathe Mahankal Legislative Assembly. He lost the election of MLA in Tasgaon Kavathe Mahankal Assembly by few votes. In February 2014 he quit NCP and joined Bharatiya Janata Party. He contested Sangli seat in Indian general elections in 2014 as BJP / NDA candidate and won the election with the majority of 238,000 votes. He defeated the Indian National Congress leader Pratik Patil. In 2019, he retained Sangli seat in the general election. In 2024, he lost the election for Sangli seat to Vishal Patil. On 25 October 2024 he joined the hands with Nationalist Congress Party Ajit Pawar to get a ticket from Tasgaon-Kavthe Mahankal Assembly to contest against Rohit Patil of Nationalist Congress Party Sharad Pawar and lost.
