= Vilasrao Narayan Jagtap =

Indian politician

Vilasrao Narayan Jagtap is a member of the 13th Maharashtra Legislative Assembly. He is a follower of Phule, Shahu and Ambedkar.. He represents the Jath Assembly Constituency. He belongs to the Bharatiya Janata Party. He has been president of Sangli District Central Co-operative Bank Limited, between August, 2007 and December, 2009.
