= Kirloskar =

Kirloskar may refer to

- Kirloskar Group an Indian conglomerate that relates to
  - Kirloskar Brothers, a pump manufacturing company
  - Toyota Kirloskar Motor, a subsidiary of Toyota, which is partly owned by Kirloskar Group
  - Laxmanrao Kirloskar (1869–1956), an Indian businessman and the founder of the Kirloskar Group
  - S. L. Kirloskar (1903–1994), an Indian businessman, son of Laxmanrao
  - Sanjay Kirloskar (born 1957), an Indian businessman, grandson of S. L. Kirloskar
- Annasaheb Kirloskar (1843–1885), an Indian playwright
