= Shamba Joshi =

Indian linguist

Shankara Baaladeekshita Joshi (1896– 28 Sep 1991), popularly referred to as Sham Ba Joshi, was an authority on the culture of Karnataka. Joshi was known for his unique and distinctive style of research. The range of his interests, study, research and thinking was very extensive. As a result, he was able to do seminal research in linguistic analysis including the historical names of different places, divine imagery and religious symbolism. Kannada Pustaka Praadhikara has brought out a collection of all his works in 1999 in a six-volume publication. He spent most time in Sadankeri in Dharwad, India.

He was born on 4 January 1896 in Gurlhosur village located in Saundatti taluka of Belgaum district, Karnataka.

== Works ==
- Aravinda Ghoshara charithravu (1921)
- Upanishat rahasya (translation - 1928)
- Tilaka kathaamruthasaara (1932)
- Kanmareyaada Kannada (1933)
- Maharaastrada moola (1934)
- Karnatakada veera kshtriyaru (1937)
- Kamnudiya Huttu athava Niruktha (1937)
- Kannadada nele (1939)
- Shiva rahasya (1939)
- Makkala vadapugalu (1940)
- Roodi Haagu bhaavika kalpanegalu (1940)
- Tanthragaara karatakaraaya (1943)
- Eddelu kannadiga athava asanthoshave ellgeya moola (1943)
- Agnividye (1946)
- Yedegalu haeluva kamnaada kathe (1947)
- Karna Mooru chithragalu (1947)
- Yaksha prashne athava baraliruva samaaja (1948)
- Samaaja darshana (1949)
- Soundarya vichara (1949)
- Kannada nudiya jeevala (1950)
- Daariya buthi (1950)
- Haalumatha darshana (1960)
- Karnaata sumskrutiya poorvapeetike (1967)
- Rugveda saara-naaga prathimaa vichara (1971)
- Bhashe mathu sumskruti (1975)
- Sat-tya mathu sathya (1975)
- Kannada saahithyada abhivruddi (1976)
- Pravaaha pathithara karma - Hindu emba dharma (1976)
- Shrimat bhagavadgeeteyalli hudugiruva rajayogada rahaysa (1977)
- Saamskrutika mooladallina taatvika chintanegalu (1978)
- Vaivasata manu praneeta Manava dharmada aakruti (1979)
- Budana Jaathaka (1980)
- Kamnaadavara sumskrutiya gati - stiti (1981)
- Bithiddannu belako (1984)
- Jeevanada arthagrahana paddati (1986)
- Marhaati Samskruti - kelavu samasyegalu (translation by Keertinatha kurthakoti from Marati - 1993)
- Aayda lekhanagalu - Editor Mallepuram G. Venkatesh (1996)
- Stityanthara (translation by Goureesha kaikini from Marati - 1993)
- Prathimaa (2010)
- Aayda lekhanagalu - Ed. Jyothi Hosura (2012)
