= Pune Airport =

Airport serving Pune, Maharashtra, India

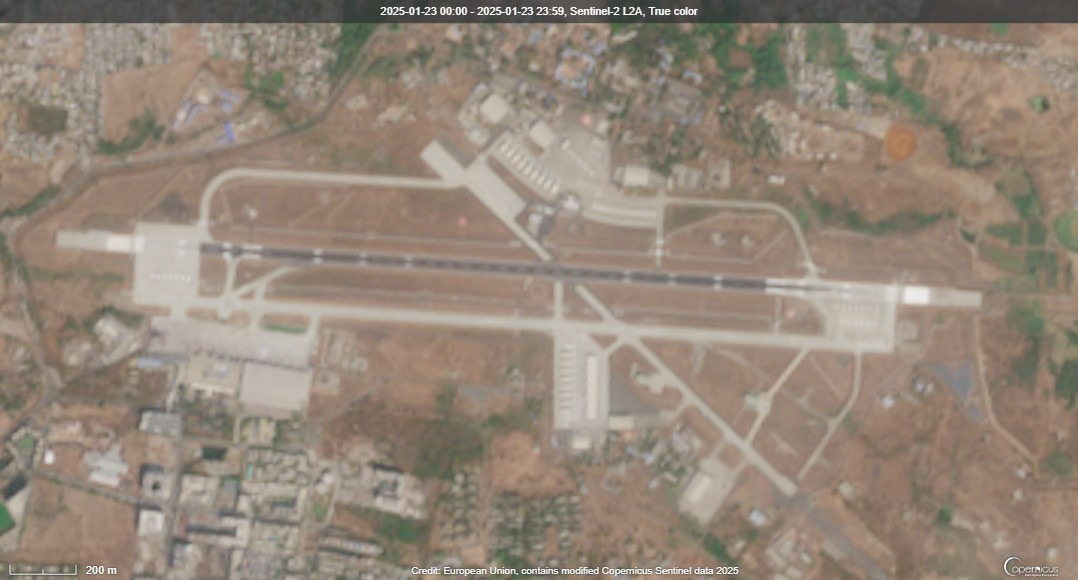
- New Terminal and satellite image of the airport
- IATA: PNQ; ICAO: VAPO; WMO: 43064

Summary
- Airport type: Public/Military
- Owner: Indian Air Force
- Operator: Airports Authority of India
- Serves: Pune Metropolitan Region
- Location: Lohegaon, Pune, Maharashtra, India
- Opened: 1939; 87 years ago
- Elevation AMSL: 592 m (1,942 ft)
- Coordinates: 18°34′56″N 073°55′11″E

Map
- Location within Maharashtra Location within India

Runways
Direction	Length		Surface
Direction	m	ft	Surface
10/28	2,539	8,329	Asphalt

Statistics (April 2025 - March 2026)
- Passengers: 11,005,988 (▲5.2%)
- Aircraft movements: 71,523 (▲3.9%)
- Cargo tonnage: 54,711.9 (▲29.4%)
- Source: AAI

Pune Airport (IATA: PNQ, ICAO: VAPO) is a customs airport (Note: Airport with customs checking and clearance facility, and handles predominantly domestic traffic. A very limited number of international flights are allowed to operate from the airport.) and an Indian Air Force (IAF) base (called Lohagaon Air Force Station) serving the city of Pune and Pimpri Chinchwad, Maharashtra, India. It is located at Lohagaon, approximately 11 km (6.8 mi) northeast of the historic centre of Pune. The airport is a civil enclave operated by the Airports Authority of India at the western side of Lohagaon Air Force Station. A name change has been proposed for the airport to Jagadguru Sant Tukaram Maharaj Airport, which has been approved by the State Government.

The airport is the ninth-busiest airport by passenger traffic in India. The airport serves both domestic and international flights. In financial year 2024-25, the airport handled over 10.4 million passengers.

== Overview ==
Pune Airport has a 2,540 m (8,330 ft) long runway oriented 10/28. A former secondary runway is now used as a taxiway by the IAF. A 2,200 m × 23 m (7,218 ft × 75 ft) parallel taxiway was constructed by AAI to facilitate civil operation on the southern side of runway 10/28. The airfield is equipped with night landing facilities as well as navigational facilities like DVOR/DME and an NDB. As Pune's air traffic control is operated by the IAF, there is often friction between the AAI and the IAF over flight schedules and night landings. There is currently a basic working relationship between the two parties; they have agreed to allow night landings of civilian flights for the time being, though this is not a long-term solution.

In 2025, Pune Airport was ranked first among Indian airports in the Airports Council International–Airport Service Quality (ACI‑ASQ) survey in the category for airports handling 5–15 million passengers, with a score of 4.96 out of 5 in the third and fourth quarters.

== History ==
The airfield was established in 1939 as RAF Poona to provide air security to the city of Mumbai. The base was home to World War II squadrons of de Havilland Mosquito and Vickers Wellington bombers and Supermarine Spitfire fighter aircraft. In May 1947, the Royal Indian Air Force took charge of the airfield.

Air India commenced a route to Dubai, the airport's first international flight, in December 2005. Indian Airlines began service to Singapore the following day. In 2004–05, the airport handled about 165 passengers a day or around 60,000 passengers annually. It increased to 250 passengers a day in 2005–06. There was a sharp rise in 2006–07 when the number reached 4,309 passengers a day (1,500,000 a year) and more than 2.8 million passengers a year in 2010–2011 (about 8,000 passengers a day).

In July 2008, Lufthansa's inaugural flight from Frankfurt arrived in Pune, linking the airport with Europe for the first time. The direct service was operated by PrivatAir and catered to the many automotive, biotechnology and other companies that had operations in the city. PrivatAir flew the route with a long-range version of an Airbus A319 that only had business-class seats; the Pune airport's short runway meant that Lufthansa could not use a larger jet with an economy-class cabin. PrivatAir also had to reduce the seating capacity so that the aircraft could carry enough fuel for the long-haul flight.

A ₹ 100 crore airport modernisation plan was launched in preparation for the Commonwealth Youth Games hosted by Pune. In August 2008, AAI completed the construction of two new terminal extensions for international passenger departures and arrivals, measuring nearly 12,000 m^{2} (130,000 sq ft) on either side of the 6,500 m^{2} (70,000 sq ft) old main terminal building, which was inadequate for the increase in passengers and flight operations. The terminal extensions have helped ease the peak-time pressure of air passengers. Facilities developed on the air side include a new parallel taxi track and an apron expanded to accommodate eight Airbus A320 or Boeing 737 aircraft. In 2010, Lufthansa introduced economy class on the Frankfurt route; due to the recession, companies preferred to book economy-class tickets for their employees.

Two aerobridges were commissioned in 2011. New conveyor belts and passenger facilities including a modern spa were also commissioned. An instrument landing system (ILS) has been proposed to ensure smooth takeoffs and landings even in deteriorated weather conditions. All the offices of the AAI and the Central Industrial Security Force will move to the new administrative block, creating more space in the terminal building. The building will also house a VIP lounge with independent access to the airport terminal building. The airport power sub-station near the entrance gate will also be shifted to the new building freeing up more space for developing passenger amenities.

Lufthansa stopped flying to Frankfurt in June 2018, as it had suspended its wet-lease arrangement with PrivatAir. Five months later, Lufthansa resumed the link using its own plane. The flights made a technical stop in Baku. Afterward, the carrier reached a new agreement with PrivatAir whereby the latter would take over the route in February 2019. PrivatAir went bankrupt in December 2018, however. As a result, the last Lufthansa flight departed Pune in January 2019.

The Airports Authority of India has invested ₹ 40 crore in 2018 for a brand new second terminal, which will be integrated into the existing one in order to ease air traffic. Construction began in late 2018 and was completed in March 2024. It was inaugurated by Prime Minister Narendra Modi on 10 March 2024, and was opened on 14 July 2024.

The airport had planned to begin international flights to European countries in mid-2026, with direct routes from Pune to Netherlands and Germany. Due to lack of available infrastructure caused by the airport's runway expansion delays, the mid 2026 deadline was missed.

== Airlines and destinations ==
Airlines	Destinations
Air India	Delhi
Air India Express	Abu Dhabi, Amritsar, Bagdogra, Bangkok–Suvarnabhumi, Bengaluru, Bhubaneswar, Chandigarh, Chennai, Delhi, Hyderabad (resumes 25 October 2026), Indore, Jaipur, Kochi, Kolkata (resumes 25 October 2026), Lucknow, Mangaluru, Siliguri
Akasa Air	Ahmedabad, Bengaluru, Delhi, Goa–Mopa, Kolkata
Alliance Air	Hyderabad
Fly91	Goa–Mopa, Jalgaon, Mangaluru, Sindhudurg
IndiGo	Ahmedabad, Amritsar, Bengaluru, Bhopal, Bhubaneswar (resumes 25 October 2026), Chandigarh, Chennai, Coimbatore, Dehradun, Delhi, Dubai–International, Goa–Dabolim, Goa–Mopa, Guwahati, Hubli, Hyderabad, Indore, Jaipur, Jodhpur, Kochi, Kolkata, Lucknow, Mangaluru, Nagpur, Patna, Raipur, Rajkot, Ranchi, Surat, Thiruvananthapuram, Vadodara, Varanasi
SpiceJet	Ahmedabad, Bengaluru, Chennai, Delhi, Dubai–International, Goa–Mopa, Jaipur, Varanasi
Star Air	Hyderabad, Kishangarh, Nagpur, Nanded, Solapur, Tirupati

== Statistics ==
Annual passengers
Year	Passengers
2015-16	5,417,167
2016-17	6,787,391
2017-18	8,164,840
2018-19	9,070,917
2019-20	8,085,607
2020-21	2,137,859
2021-22	3,713,491
2022-23	8,007,160
2023-24	9,525,484
2024-25	10,457,694
2025-26	11,005,988

Traffic by financial year
Financial year	Passengers	Change from previous year	Aircraft operations	Cargo tonnage
2024-25	10,457,694	▲9.8%	68,830	42,293
2023-24	9,525,484	▲19.0%	64,039	37,841
2022-23	8,007,160	▲115.6%	59,451	39,369
2021-22	3,713,491	▲73.7%	N/A	N/A
2020-21	2,137,859	▼73.6%	19,831	N/A
2019-20	8,085,607	▼10.9%	54,261	N/A
2018-19	9,070,917	▲11.1%	59,888	N/A
2017-18	8,164,840	▲20.6%	56,021	41,566
2016-17	6,787,391	▲25.3%	46,932	35,312
2015-16	5,417,167	▲29.3%	40,726	31,766

Busiest domestic routes from PNQ (2023–24)
Rank	Airport	Carriers	Departing passengers
1	Delhi	Air India, Air India Express, Akasa Air, IndiGo, SpiceJet	1,403,897
2	Bengaluru, Karnataka	Air India, Air India Express, Akasa Air, IndiGo	894,245
3	Chennai, Tamil Nadu	Air India Express, IndiGo, SpiceJet	299,804
4	Hyderabad, Telangana	Air India Express, IndiGo, Star Air	290,259
5	Ahmedabad, Gujarat	Akasa Air, IndiGo, SpiceJet	240,558
6	Nagpur, Maharashtra	IndiGo, Star Air	206,997
7	Kolkata, West Bengal	Akasa Air, IndiGo	175,814
8	Jaipur, Rajasthan	Air India Express, IndiGo, SpiceJet	132,716
9	Lucknow, Uttar Pradesh	Air India Express, IndiGo	111,469
10	Bhubaneswar, Odisha	Air India Express	76,790

Busiest international routes from PNQ (2023–24)
Rank	Airport	Carriers	Departing passengers
1	Dubai, United Arab Emirates	SpiceJet	60,267
2	Singapore	Air India	30,737

== Future ==
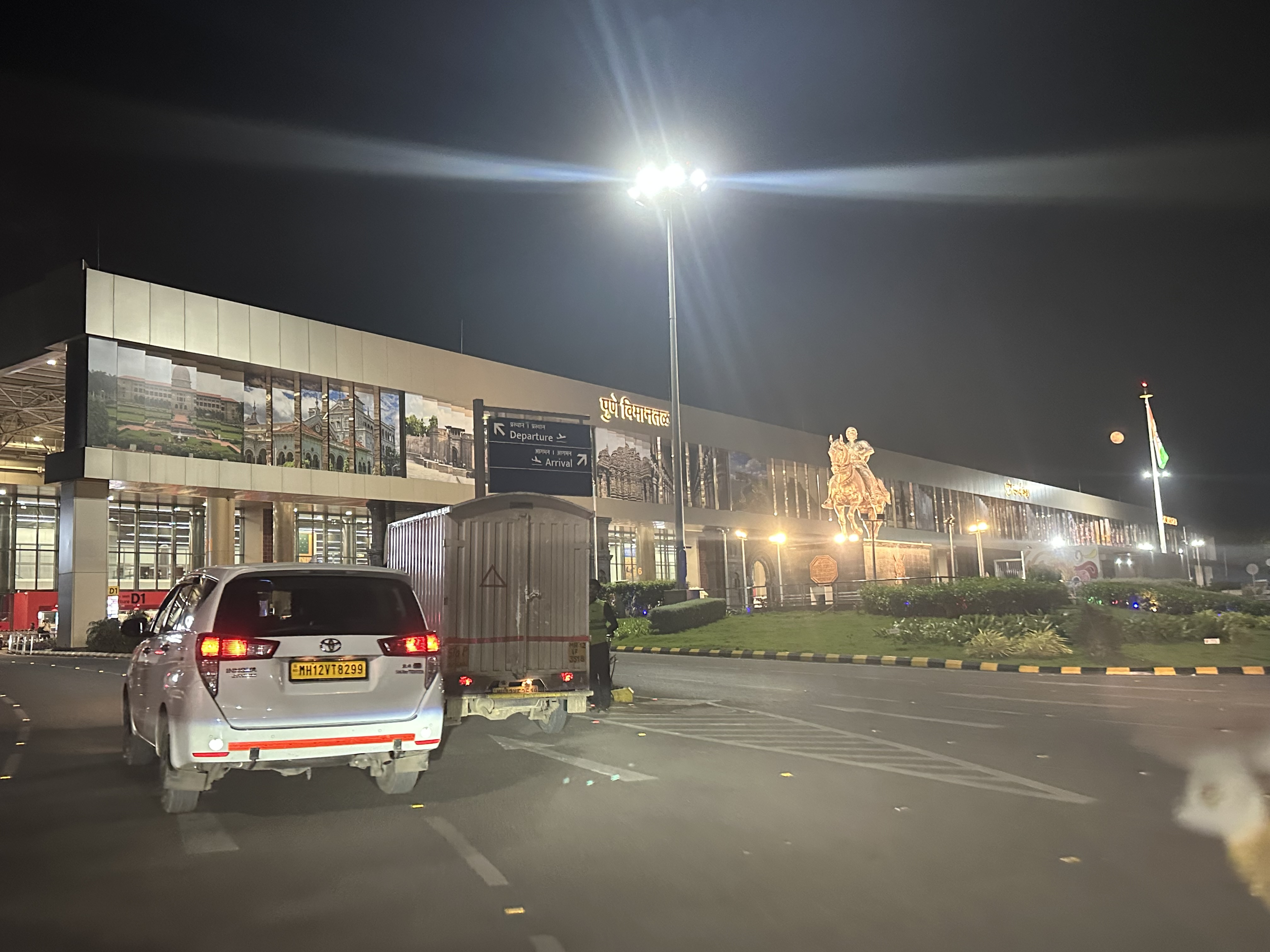
Entrance of new terminal

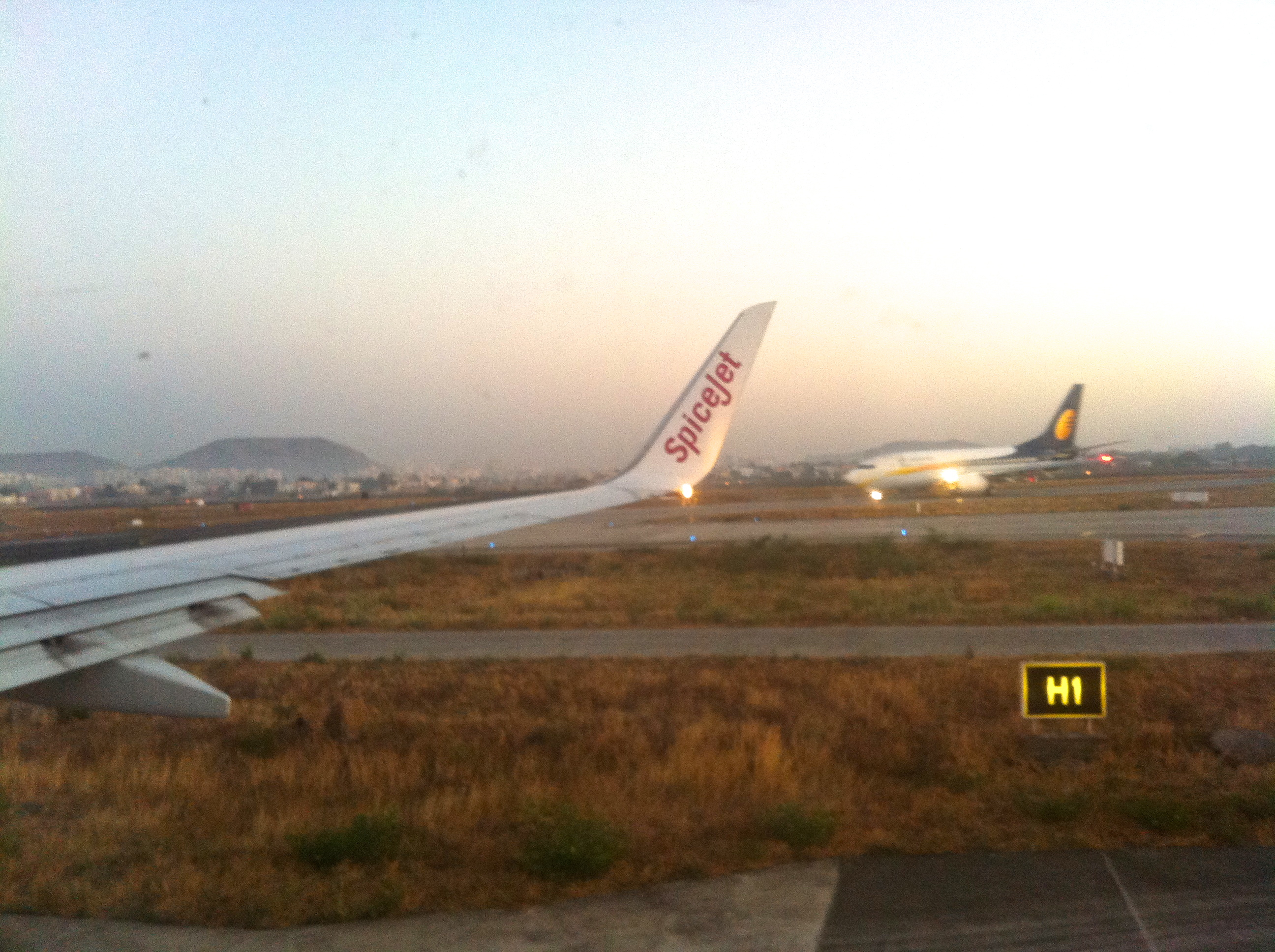
Aircraft at Pune Airport

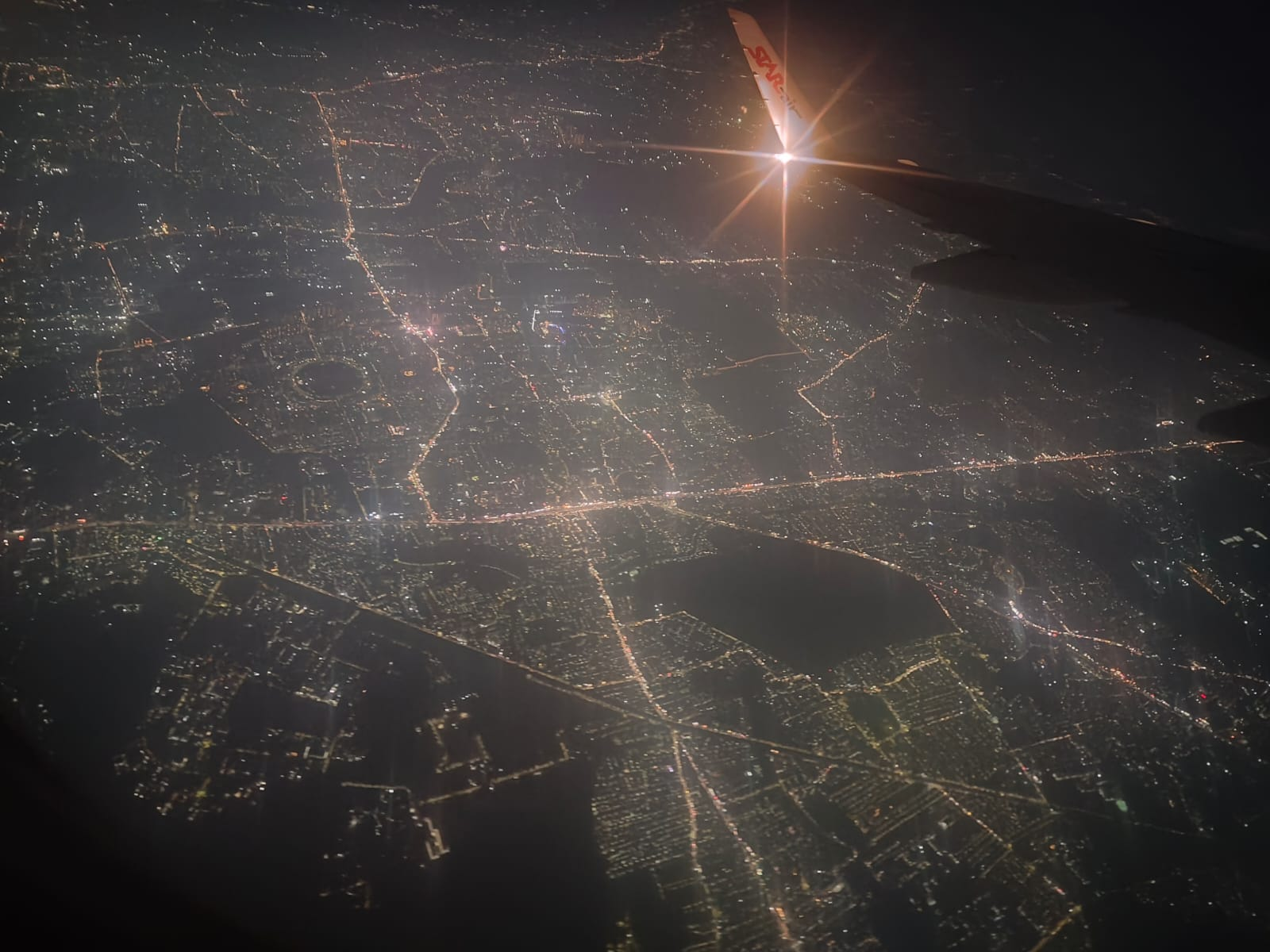
Aerial View of Pune from Airplane Window

=== Cargo terminal ===
There is a proposal to create an international cargo facility from this airport. This project will enable foreign cargo operators to operate in the airport. The airport was declared as customs airport on 17 January 1997, primarily for exporting perishable agricultural products. This project will also help to attract foreign airlines to operate at the airport. The 600 sq.m. terminal will be located adjacent to the new second terminal.

=== Airport expansion ===
A second terminal has been built on the eastern side of the current airport terminal. It covers an area of about 52,000 m^{2} (560,000 sq ft), which is twice the size of the current terminal and has a capacity of serving over 9 million passengers annually. It has five aerobridges and several advanced technologies, facilities and amenities, five baggage carousels, 34 counters, 25 self-check-in counters, duty-free shops, retail stores, food courts, waiting areas, lounges, restrooms, and many others. The terminal has a unique design showcasing the culture and heritage of Maharashtra, such as the depictions of traditional folklore, art like Warli and a bronze statue of Chhatrapati Shivaji Maharaj in front of the terminal. It was estimated to be completed by the end of 2020, but due to the COVID-19 pandemic, which caused lockdowns and curfews, lack of labour caused several delays in work. In September 2021, construction work resumed. In November 2022, it was 75% completed, and was expected to be completed by May 2023. It was finished and inaugurated by Prime Minister Narendra Modi on 10 March 2024 via video conferencing. However, the opening of the terminal got delayed due to longstanding processes of receiving permission to operationalise and shortage of Central Industrial Security Force (CISF) personnel at the airport for security. These issues were solved and the terminal was opened for regular operations on 14 July 2024, with the first flights operated by Air India and Air India Express to Delhi and Bhubaneswar.

=== Proposal for a new international airport ===
Due to the limited expansion options available, the airport will not be able to cope with the growing demand for air traffic into Pune. Hence, a greenfield airport for the Pune metropolitan region has been proposed. The Government of Maharashtra has entrusted the responsibility to Maharashtra Airport Development Company (MADC) for executing the Pune International Airport project. Probable sites for this project had earlier included areas around Talegaon Dabhade and Saswad near Pune. An area between Chakan and Rajgurunagar, around the villages of Chandus and Shiroli was under consideration.

However, due to land acquisition issues, a new site has been proposed. This site is not very distant from the city but is near to the city limits. The greenfield airport will be located near the villages of Ambodi, Sonori, Kumbharvalan, Ekhatpur-Munjawadi, Khanwadi, Pargaon Memane, Rajewadi, Aamble, Tekwadi, Vanpuri, Udachiwadi, and Singapur near Saswad and Jejuri in Purandar taluka of Pune District in the Indian state of Maharashtra. The proposed airport in Purandar will be spread over 2,832 hectares. This airport will also boost trade from Pune and neighbouring districts as it will have its own dedicated cargo terminal. MADC requested proposals from consultants to conduct techno-economic feasibility studies, assist in obtaining the required statutory approvals and provide project management services.

In August 2020, Deputy Chief Minister Ajit Pawar told the Pune district administration to check the feasibility of developing the new Pune International Airport at an alternative site proposed by Purandar MLA Sanjay Jagtap. The MLA had proposed land acquisition at Pandeshwar, Rise, and Pise villages, instead of the seven villages in Purandar taluka which have opposed land acquisition since the project was announced in October 2016. Total land acquisition cost is expected to be ₹ 4000 crore for the existing site. If the new site gets approved, land acquisition costs are likely to be reduced.

Senior officials of the Maharashtra Airport Development Company Limited (MADC) have said that shifting the site of the Purandar Airport will lead to a delay of more than two years in getting fresh approvals and carrying out surveys of the new site.

== Access ==
- Pune Metro operates to Ramwadi Metro Station which is around 3 km from the terminal building.
- PMPML, which is Pune's public transport bus provider, operates feeder services connecting the terminal to Ramwadi Metro Station.
- Pre-paid taxicab and auto rickshaw services to and from the airport are available. Coach services to various key locations in Pune and private car rental services are available. PMPML also operates an airport shuttle to and from the city.

== See also ==
- Airports in India
- List of busiest airports in India by passenger traffic
