= Sanjay Kirloskar =

Indian industrialist and the chairman of the Kirloskar Brothers Ltd

- Born: 22 March 1957 (age 69); Nagpur, Bombay State (present–day Maharashtra), India
- Education: Illinois Institute of Technology
- Occupations: Chairman & MD Kirloskar Brothers Ltd
- Children: 2
- Father: Chandrakant Kirloskar

Sanjay Kirloskar is an Indian industrialist and the chairman of the Kirloskar Brothers Ltd (a Kirloskar Group company), and the largest pump manufacturer in India.

Under his leadership Kirloskar Brothers Ltd is India's largest pump manufacturer, which produces centrifugal pumps from 0.1 kW to 26 MW.

== Early life ==
Sanjay Kirloskar is the son of Chandrakant Kirloskar and the grandson of Shantanurao Laxmanrao Kirloskar. He graduated with a Bachelor of Science degree in mechanical engineering from the Illinois Institute of Technology, Chicago in 1978.

== Career ==
Kirloskar Brothers acquired SPP Pumps (UK), in 2002 and then Aban Construction, one of India's leading construction companies in 2006, followed by The Kolhapur Steels limited in 2007 and Braybar Pumps Ltd (South Africa) in 2010, Syncroflo Inc (USA) in 2014 and Rodelta Pumps International B.V. (The Netherlands) in 2015. For the last 5 years, Kirloskar Brothers has shown an average RONW (Return on Net Worth) of 32%.

Kirloskar Brothers Ltd received the ASME N-STAMP in 2012 and is the first Indian company in rotating equipment to receive this as well as amongst a few companies in the world to have this accreditation.

Sanjay Kirloskar also set up the all-women operated and managed manufacturing plant of Kirloskar Brothers Ltd at Coimbatore in 2010 as part of a drive to have more women in the core engineering industry. Coimbatore is the second largest metropolitan city of state Tamil Nadu in India. Today Kirloskar Brothers is India's largest Pump& Valve manufacturer and one of the World's largest Pump manufacturer's by market capitalization.

== Trademark dispute within the Kirloskar Group ==
Sanjay has been involved in a long-running legal dispute concerning the use and licensing of the “Kirloskar” trademark within the Kirloskar Group. The conflict arose after Kirloskar Proprietary Limited (KPL), which administers the trademark for group companies, sought to revise trademark user agreements with several firms, including KBL. KBL declined to sign the revised agreement and filed a civil suit in Pune in 2018 challenging the proposed changes.

In January 2025, a Pune court granted interim relief to Kirloskar Brothers Limited in the matter. Subsequent proceedings in the Bombay High Court allowed KPL to license the trademark to certain group companies while restricting its use in businesses overlapping with those of KBL. In October 2025, the High Court modified its order to further restrict licensing of the mark in competing sectors, a decision that was later stayed by the Supreme Court pending further consideration.
