= Thomas Savery =

English engineer; invented the first commercial steam pump (c.1650–1715)

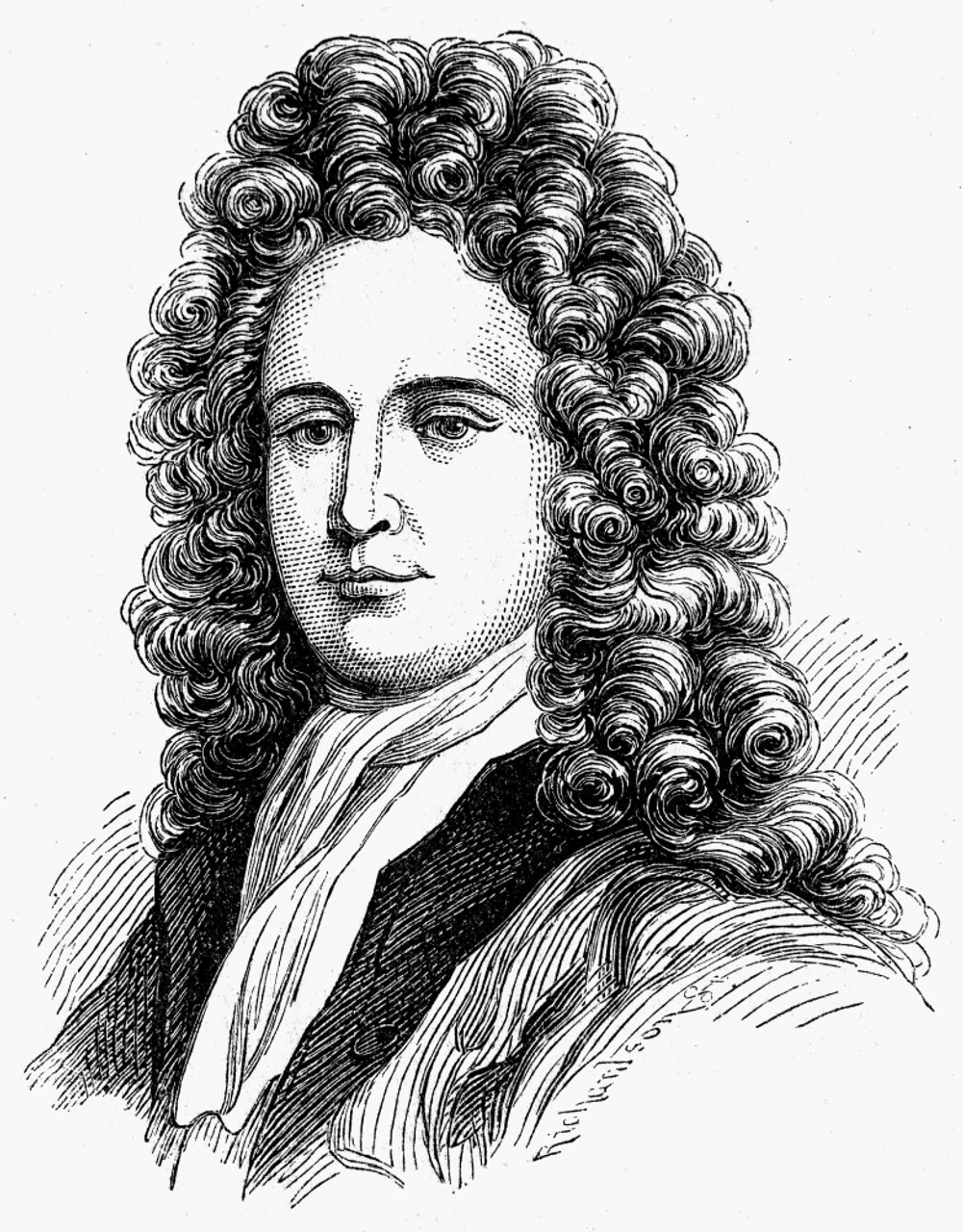
- Born: c. 1650; Shilstone, Modbury, Devon, England
- Died: 1715; London, England

Thomas Savery (/ˈseɪvəri/; c. 1650 – 15 May 1715) was an English inventor and engineer. He invented the first commercially used steam-powered device, a steam pump which is often referred to as the "Savery engine". Savery's steam pump was a revolutionary method of pumping water, which improved mine drainage and made widespread public water supply practicable.

== Career ==
Thomas Savery was born around 1650 at the manor house of Shilstone, near Modbury, Devon. He received a good education and became a military engineer, rising to the rank of captain by 1702. He spent his free time performing experiments in mechanics. In 1696 he took out a patent for a machine for polishing glass or marble, and another for "rowing of ships with greater ease and expedition than hitherto been done by any other" which involved paddle-wheels driven by a capstan; however, this was dismissed by the Admiralty following a negative report by Edmund Dummer, the Surveyor of the Navy.

Savery also worked for the Sick and Hurt Commissioners, contracting the supply of medicines to the Navy Stock Company, which was connected with the Society of Apothecaries. His duties on their behalf took him to Dartmouth, Devon, which is probably how he came into contact with Thomas Newcomen.

=== Steam-powered pump ===
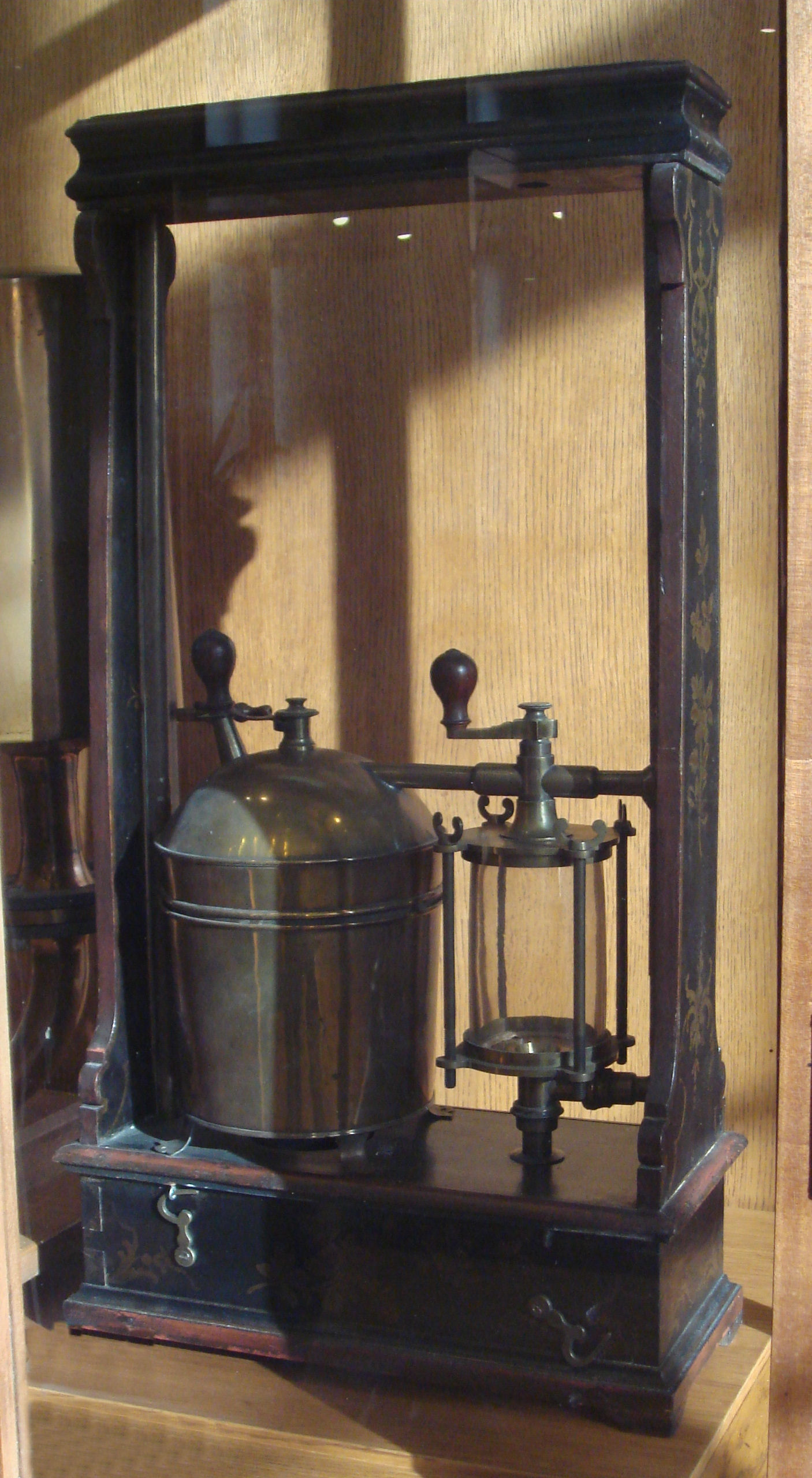
Fire pump, Savery system, 1698

On 2 July 1698 Savery patented a steam-powered pump, which he called:

A new invention for raiseing of water and occasioning motion to all sorts of mill work by the impellent force of fire, which will be of great use and advantage for drayning mines, serveing townes with water, and for the working of all sorts of mills where they have not the benefitt of water nor constant windes. (Note: Jenkins, p.66)

It was referred to as the "Savery engine" following contemporary use of the word "engine" to mean any device or contrivance. He demonstrated it to the Royal Society on 14 June 1699. The patent had no illustrations or description, but in 1702 Savery described the machine in his book The Miner's Friend; or, An Engine to Raise Water by Fire, in which he claimed that it could pump water out of mines.

Schematic of Savery engine operation. The engine sucks water in with valves a and c closed, and valves b and d open. It pushes water up with valves a and c open, and valves b and d closed.

Savery's was a pistonless pump with no moving parts except from the taps. It was operated by first raising steam in the boiler; the steam was then admitted to one of the first working vessels, allowing it to blow out through a downpipe into the water that was to be raised. When the system was hot and therefore full of steam the tap between the boiler and the working vessel was shut, and if necessary the outside of the vessel was cooled. This made the steam inside it condense, creating a partial vacuum, and atmospheric pressure pushed water up the downpipe until the vessel was full. At this point the tap below the vessel was closed, and the tap between it and the up-pipe opened, and more steam was admitted from the boiler. As the steam pressure built up, it forced the water from the vessel up the up-pipe to the top of the mine.

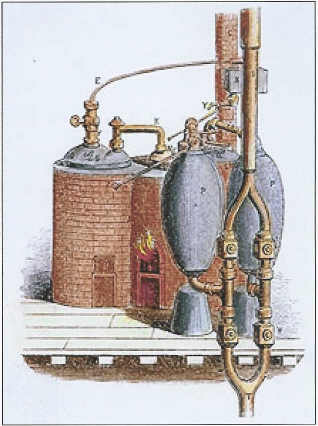
The 1698 Savery Engine

However, his pump had four serious problems. First, every time water was admitted to the working vessel much of the heat was wasted in warming up the water that was being pumped. Second, the next stage of the process required high-pressure steam to force the water up, and the pump's soldered joints were barely capable of withstanding high pressure steam and needed frequent repair. Third, although this pump used positive steam pressure to push water up out (with no theoretical limit to the height to which water could be lifted by a single high-pressure pump) practical and safety considerations meant that in practice, to clear water from a deep mine would have needed a series of moderate-pressure pumps all the way from the bottom level to the surface. Fourth, water was pushed up into the pump only by atmospheric pressure (working against a condensed-steam 'vacuum'), so the pump had to be no more than about 30 feet (9.1 m) above the water level – requiring it to be installed, operated, and maintained far down in the dark mines all over.

=== Fire Engine Act ===
Savery's original patent of July 1698 gave 14 years' protection; the next year, 1699, an Act of Parliament was passed which extended his protection for a further 21 years. This act "Encouraging Thomas Savery's invention for raising water and relating to all sorts of mill work" became known as the "Fire Engine Act". Savery's very broad patent covered all pumps that raised water by fire.

The architect James Smith of Whitehill acquired the rights to use Savery's pump in Scotland. In 1699, he entered into an agreement with the inventor, and in 1701 he secured a patent from the Parliament of Scotland, modelled on Savery's grant in England, and designed to run for the same period of time. Smith described the machine as "an engine or invention for raising of water and occasioning motion of mill-work by the force of fire", and he claimed to have modified it to pump from a depth of 14 fathoms, or 84 feet. (Note: Jenkins, p.66)

In England, Savery's patent meant that Thomas Newcomen was forced to go into partnership with him. By 1712, arrangements had been made between the two men to develop Newcomen's more advanced design of steam engine, which was marketed under Savery's patent, adding water tanks and pump rods so that deeper water mines could be accessed with steam power. Newcomen's engine worked purely by atmospheric pressure, thereby avoiding the dangers of high-pressure steam, and used the piston concept invented in 1690 by the Frenchman Denis Papin to produce the first steam engine capable of raising water from deep mines.

When Papin was back to London in 1707, he was asked by Isaac Newton, new President of the Royal Society after Robert Boyle, Papin's friend, to work with Savery, who worked for five years with Papin, but never gave any credit nor revenue to the French scientist.

After his death in 1715 Savery's patent and Act of Parliament became vested in a company, The Proprietors of the Invention for Raising Water by Fire. (Note: Jenkins, pp. 78–79) This company issued licences to others for the building and operation of Newcomen engines, charging as much as £420 per year patent royalties for the construction of steam engines. In one case a colliery paid the Proprietors £200 per year and half their net profits "in return for their services in keeping the engine going".

The Fire Engine Act did not expire until 1733, four years after the death of Newcomen.

=== Application of the steam pump ===
A newspaper in March 1702 announced that Savery's pumps were ready for use and might be seen on Wednesday and Saturday afternoons at his workhouse in Salisbury Court, London, over against the Old Playhouse.

One of his pumps was set up at York Buildings in London. According to later descriptions, the pump produced steam "eight or ten times stronger than common air" (approximately 8 to10 atmospheres), but blew open the joints of the machine, forcing him to solder the joints with spelter.

Another was built to control the water supply at Hampton Court, while another at Campden House in Kensington operated for 18 years.

A few Savery pumps were tried in mines, an unsuccessful attempt being made to use one to clear water from a pool called Broad Waters in Wednesbury (then in Staffordshire) and nearby coal mines. This had been covered by a sudden eruption of water some years before. However, the pump could not be "brought to answer", and the quantity of steam raised was so great it was described to have "rent the whole machine to pieces". The steam pump was laid aside, and the scheme for raising water was dropped as impracticable. This may have been in about 1705.

Another pump was proposed in 1706 by George Sparrow at Newbold near Chesterfield, where a landowner was having difficulty in obtaining the consent of his neighbours for a sough (underground channel) to drain his coal. Nothing came of this, perhaps due to the explosion of the Broad Waters pump. It is also possible that a steam pump was tried at Wheal Vor, a copper mine in Cornwall.

== Comparison with Newcomen steam engine ==
The Savery steam pump was much lower in capital cost than the Newcomen steam engine, with a 2- to 4-horsepower Savery pump costing from 150–200 GBP. It was also available in small sizes, down to one horsepower. Newcomen steam engines were larger and much more expensive. The larger size was due to the fact that piston steam engines became very inefficient in small sizes, at least until around the year 1900, when 2-horsepower piston engines were available. Savery-type pumps continued to be produced well into the late 18th century.

== Inspiration for later work ==
Several later pumping systems may be based on Savery's pump. For example, the twin-chamber pulsometer steam pump was a successful development of it.

== See also ==
- Industrial Revolution
- History of decompression research and development
- History of mining
- History of the steam engine
- Hollycombe Steam Collection
- Jerónimo de Ayanz y Beaumont
- List of British engineers
- List of inventors
- Timeline of English history
