= Kirloskar Group =

Indian conglomerate

- Type: Corporate group
- Industry: Conglomerate
- Founded: 1888; 138 years ago
- Founder: Laxmanrao Kirloskar
- Headquarters: Pune, Maharashtra, India
- Area served: Worldwide
- Key people: Atul C. Kirloskar (Chairman, Kirloskar Oil Engines Limited); Sanjay Kirloskar (CMD, Kirloskar Brothers Limited); Rahul C. Kirloskar (Chairman, Kirloskar Pneumatic Company Limited); Alok Kirloskar (MD, SPP Pumps)
- Products: Pumps; Engines; Compressors; Chillers; Valves; Pig iron; Construction; Transmissions; Pumping; Bridges; flyovers; Construction; Nuclear & conventional submarine pipelines
- Number of employees: 18,000
- Subsidiaries: Kirloskar Brothers Limited; Kirloskar Ferrous Industries Ltd.; Kirloskar Oil Engines Limited; Kirloskar Pneumatic Company Limited; Kirloskar Electric Company; Toyota Kirloskar Motor; Kirloskar Investment & Finance Limited; Kirloskar Industries; Kirloskar Chillers Private Limited
- Website: www.kirloskar.com

Kirloskar Group is an Indian conglomerate, headquartered in Pune and manufacturing plant in Kirloskarvadi. The group exports to over 70 countries over most of Africa, Southeast Asia and Europe. The flagship and holding company, Kirloskar Brothers Ltd, established in 1888 in Kirloskarvadi, kirloskar group is India's largest maker of pumps and valves. It was the manufacturer of India's first modern iron plough. One of the group companies is a major component supplier for the Indian Arihant Nuclear Submarine program

== Products ==
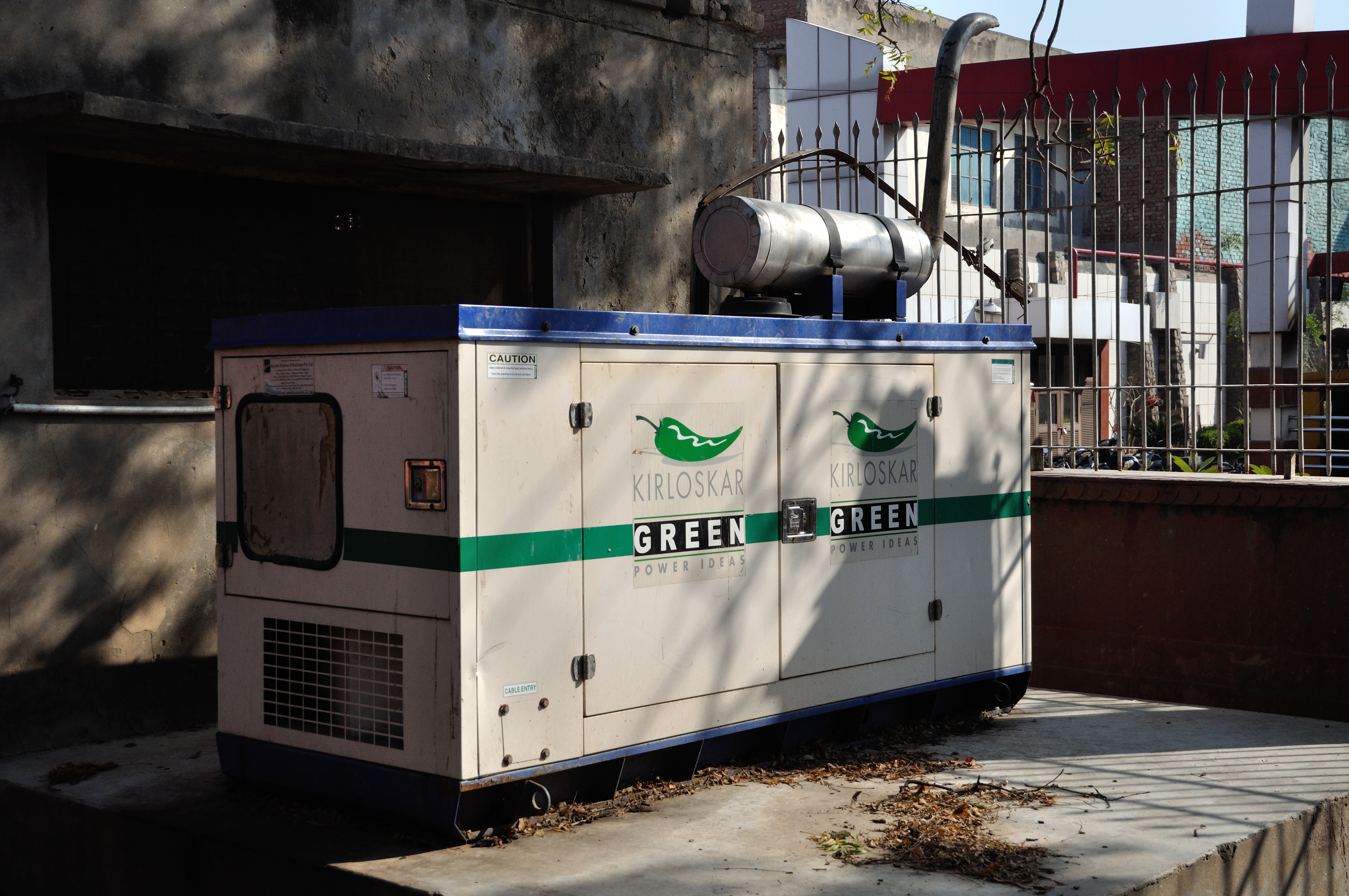
Kirloskar diesel generator unit photographed in Mathura, Uttar Pradesh

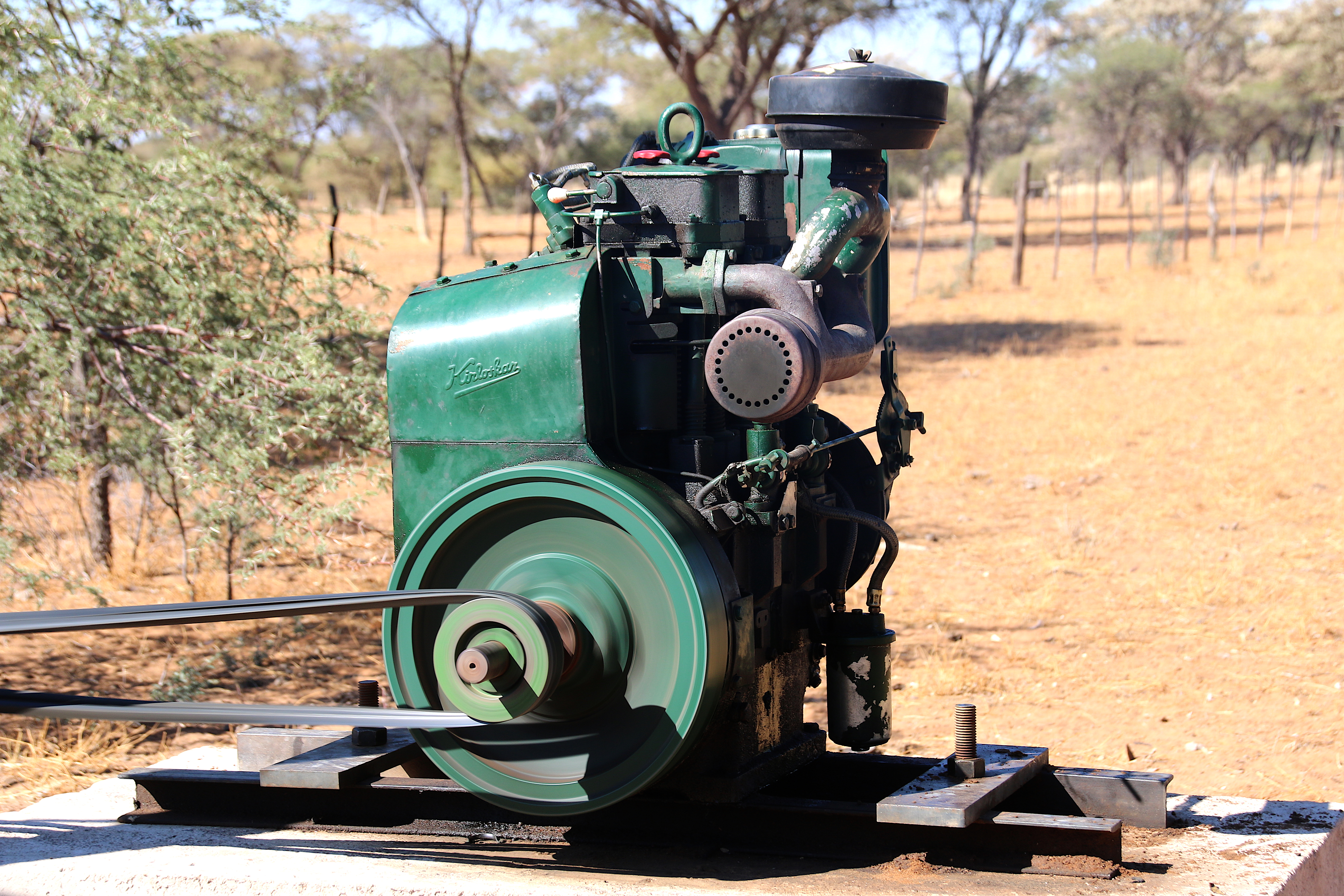
Kirloskar engine driving a water pump in Namibia

The Kirloskar group of companies was one of the earliest industrial groups in the engineering industry in India. The group produces centrifugal pumps, engines, compressors, screw & centrifugal chillers, lathes and electrical equipments like electric motors, transformers and generators. While Laxmanrao Kirloskar, established the group in 1888, his son Shantanurao Laxmanrao Kirloskar played a role in the leadership of the company. The company under Shantanurao Laxmanrao Kirloskar achieved one of the highest growth rates in Indian history, with 32,401% growth of assets from 1950 to 1991.

In 1988, Rajiv Gandhi, the then Prime Minister of India released a commemorative stamp marking the Kirloskar Group's 100th anniversary.

In 1974, in cooperation with Deutz-Fahr of Germany, Kirloskar began manufacturing tractors. They have since ceased tractor production.

The Kirloskar Group also set up India's second oldest township Kirloskarwadi, Palus which celebrated its centennial in 2010.

== Kirloskar companies ==
- Kirloskar Brothers Limited Kirloskarvadi

Kirloskar Brothers Limited Kirloskarvadi-Palus, SPP Pumps, Braybar Pumps Ltd., (South Africa) and Kolhapur Steels Ltd. Kirloskar Brothers produces Centrifugal pumps from 0.1 kW to 26 mega-watts single pumps, pumping liquids in excess of 35,000 liters/sec thus producing some of the largest pumps by size and horsepower. Kirloskar Brothers Limited was established in 1888.

- Kirloskar Oil Engines Limited (KOEL)

KOEL manufactures air-cooled and liquid-cooled diesel engines and power generating sets ranging from a power output of 2.1 kVA to 1010 kVA and solutions ranging up to 5200 kVA. KOEL manufacturing facilities are located in Kagal, Nashik and Rajkot. They also offer engines operating on alternative fuels such as biodiesel, and natural gas. Their generating sets are branded as KOEL Green Gensets in India and Kirloskar Green for exports.

On 2 April 2025, Kirloskar Oil Engines Limited was awarded a contract worth ₹270 crore (US$28 million) by the Indian Navy under the Make-I scheme through which 70% of the contract would be funded by the Government of India and the rest by the company and industry. The contract included the Project Sanction Order for the Design and Development of 6 MW (8,000 hp) Medium Speed Marine Diesel Engine, development of its prototype at over 50% indigenous content as well as Detailed Design for 3–10 MW (4,000–13,400 hp) Marine Diesel Engine.

As February 2026, the company is on track with the development and expect to deliver the four-stroke, V12 engine by April 2028. The serial production is expected post 2028.

- Kirloskar Pneumatic Company Limited

KPCL has four strategic business units, namely, Air Compressor Division (ACD), Air Conditioning and Refrigeration Division (ACR), Process Gas Systems Division (PGS) and Transmission Division (TRM).

ACD offers Air and Gas Compressors from 30 to 10,000 CFM rated capacities; Open-Type Refrigeration Compressors (50 to 500 TR), Vapor Absorption Chillers (90 to 500 TR) and Refrigeration Systems (up to 800 TR).

KPCL offers CNG packages with suction pressure of 0.5 to 65 bar and gas flow of 300 to 3,500 SCMH, American Petroleum Institute (API) gas compression packages range from 50 CFM to 6000 CFM. The company also offers wind turbine gearbox ranging from a rated capacity of up to 2.5 MW and industrial gearboxes rated up to 16 MW.

- Kirloskar Ferrous Industries Limited

Produces pig iron and grey iron castings for the automotive industry

- Kirloskar Chillers Private Limited

Produces centrifugal chillers from 250 TR to 2400 TR and air-cooled and water-cooled screw chillers from 40 TR to 550 TR for air conditioning and process cooling applications. It also offers products for hot water generation including chillers with desuperheaters and heat pumps.

- Toyota Kirloskar Motor Private Limited (TKML) produces Toyota vehicles in India
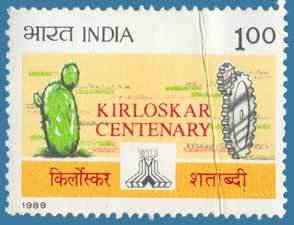
  Stamp Issued by India Post on the 100 years of the founding

== Achievements ==
Kirloskar Brothers Ltd created the world's largest irrigation project, which was commissioned in March 2007, the Sardar Sarovar Dam project for the Gujarat Government. This was done for Sardar Sarovar Narmada Nigam, and on 14 March 2008, commissioned the world's second largest water supply system, with the world's highest head in Andhra Pradesh. Kirloskar Brothers is associated with India's nuclear program and has made canned motor pumps for pumping heavy water which are deployed at Indian Nuclear Power Plants. Kirloskar Brothers Limited is also a supplier of FM UL certified pumps along with its subsidiary SPP Pumps (UK). It was the first Indian company to get FM certification for its valves. Kirloskar Brothers has a presence in numerous countries including Egypt.

Kirloskar Brothers Ltd is also one of the first pump companies to have an all women operated and managed manufacturing plant at Coimbatore, Tamil Nadu setup in 2010. The company was one of the country's top ten wealth creators in 2007.

Kirloskar Brothers Ltd won the first "best of all" Rajiv Gandhi National Quality Award in 1992.
