= Pistonless pump =

A pistonless pump is a type of pump designed to move fluids without any moving parts other than three chamber valves.

The pump contains a chamber which has a valved inlet from the fluid to be pumped, a valved outlet – both of these at the bottom of the pump, and a pressurant inlet at the top of the pump. A pressurant is used, such as steam or pressurized helium, to drive the fluid through the pump.

== Introduction ==
NASA have developed a low-cost rocket-fuel pump which has comparable performance to a turbopump at 80–90% lower cost. Perhaps the most difficult barrier to entry in the liquid rocket business is the turbopump. A turbopump design requires a large engineering effort and is expensive to manufacture and test. Starting a turbopump-fed rocket engine is a complex process, requiring a careful synchronisation of many valves and subsystems. In fact, Beal aerospace tried to avoid the issue entirely by building a huge pressure feed booster. Their booster never flew, but the engineering behind it was sound and, if they had a low cost pump at their disposal, they might be competing against Boeing. This pump saves up to 90% of the mass of the tanks as compared to a pressure-fed system. This pump has really proved to be a boon for rockets. By using this pump, the rocket does not have to carry such a heavy load and can travel with very high speed.

== Working cycle ==
The cycle is as follows:

- The fluid enters and fills the chamber from the inlet valve. The outlet and pressurant valves are closed.
- The inlet valve closes, the outlet and pressurant valves open. The presurant forces the fluid through the outlet valve.
- As the chamber empties, the presurant valve closes and the inlet valve opens, followed by the outlet valve closing.
- The cycle is repeated.

== Pumping rate ==
Rocket engines requires a tremendous amount of fuel at high pressure. Often the pump costs more than the thrust chamber. One way to supply fuel is to use the expensive turbopump mentioned above, another way is to pressurize fuel tank. Pressurizing a large fuel tank requires a heavy, expensive tank. However suppose instead of pressurizing the entire tank, the main tank is drained into a small pump chamber which is then pressurized. To achieve steady flow, the pump system consists of two pump chambers such that each one supplies fuel for half of each cycle. The pump is powered by pressurized gas which acts directly on the fluid. For each half of the pump system, a chamber is filled from the main tank under low pressure and at a high flow rate, then the chamber is pressurized, and then the fluid is delivered to the engine at a moderate flow rate under high pressure. The chamber is then vented and cycle repeats. The system is designed so that the inlet flow rate is higher than the outlet flow rate. This allows time for one chamber to be vented, refilled and pressurized while the other is being emptied. A bread board pump has been tested and it works great. A high version has been designed and built and is pumping at 20 gpm and 550 psi.

== Application in rocketry ==
It is most commonly used to supply propellants to rocket engines. In this configuration there are often two pumps working in opposite cycles to ensure a constant flow of propellants to the engine.

The pump has the advantage over a pressure-fed system in that the tanks can be much lighter. Compared to a turbopump the pistonless pump is a much simpler design and has less stringent design tolerances.

== Advantages ==
Nearly all of the hardware in this pump consists of pressure vessels, so the weight is low. There are fewer than 10 moving parts, and no lubrication issues which might cause problems with other pumps. The design and construction of this pump is straight forward and no precision parts are required. This device has advantage over standard turbopumps in that the weight is about the same, the unit, engineering and test costs are less and the chance for catastrophic failure is lower. This pump has the advantage over pressure-fed designs in that the weight of the complete rocket is much less, and the rocket is much safer because the tanks of rocket fuel do not need to be at high pressure. The pump could be started after being stored for an extended period with high reliability. It can be used to replace turbopumps for rocket booster option or it can be used to replace high pressure tanks for deep space propulsion. It can also be used for satellite orbit changes and station keeping.

== Disadvantages ==
The pistonless pumps also has some disadvantages, such as:

1. They cannot pump to higher pressure than drive gas (area ratio is 1:1).
2. They cannot use either a staged combustion or expander cycle.
3. A gas generator cycle is also difficult to integrate with the pistonless pump.
4. The generated gas must be chemically compatible with both the propellants.
5. This gas generator lowers the Ignition start period of the engine.

== See also ==
- Thomas Savery
- Pulsometer steam pump
- Hydraulic ram
- Cyclic pump

== See also ==
- Thomas Savery
- Pulsometer pump
- Hydraulic ram
- Cyclic pump
