= Kirloskar Brothers =

Indian pump manufacturer

Kirloskar Brothers Limited
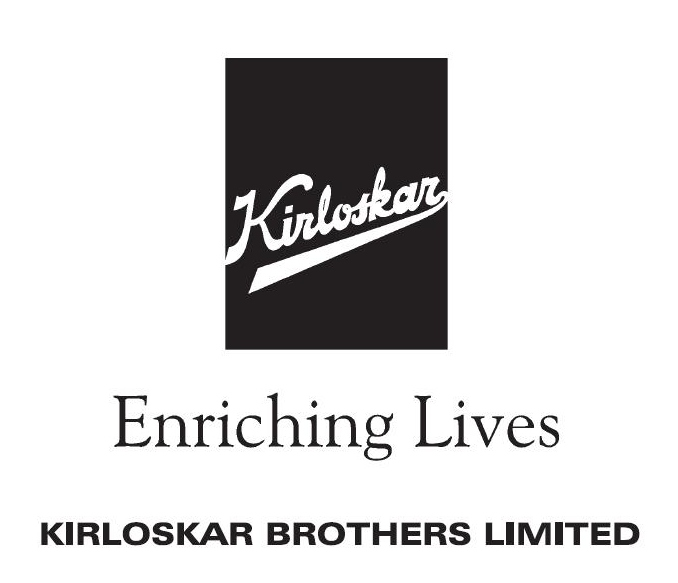
- Kirloskar Brothers Limited Logo

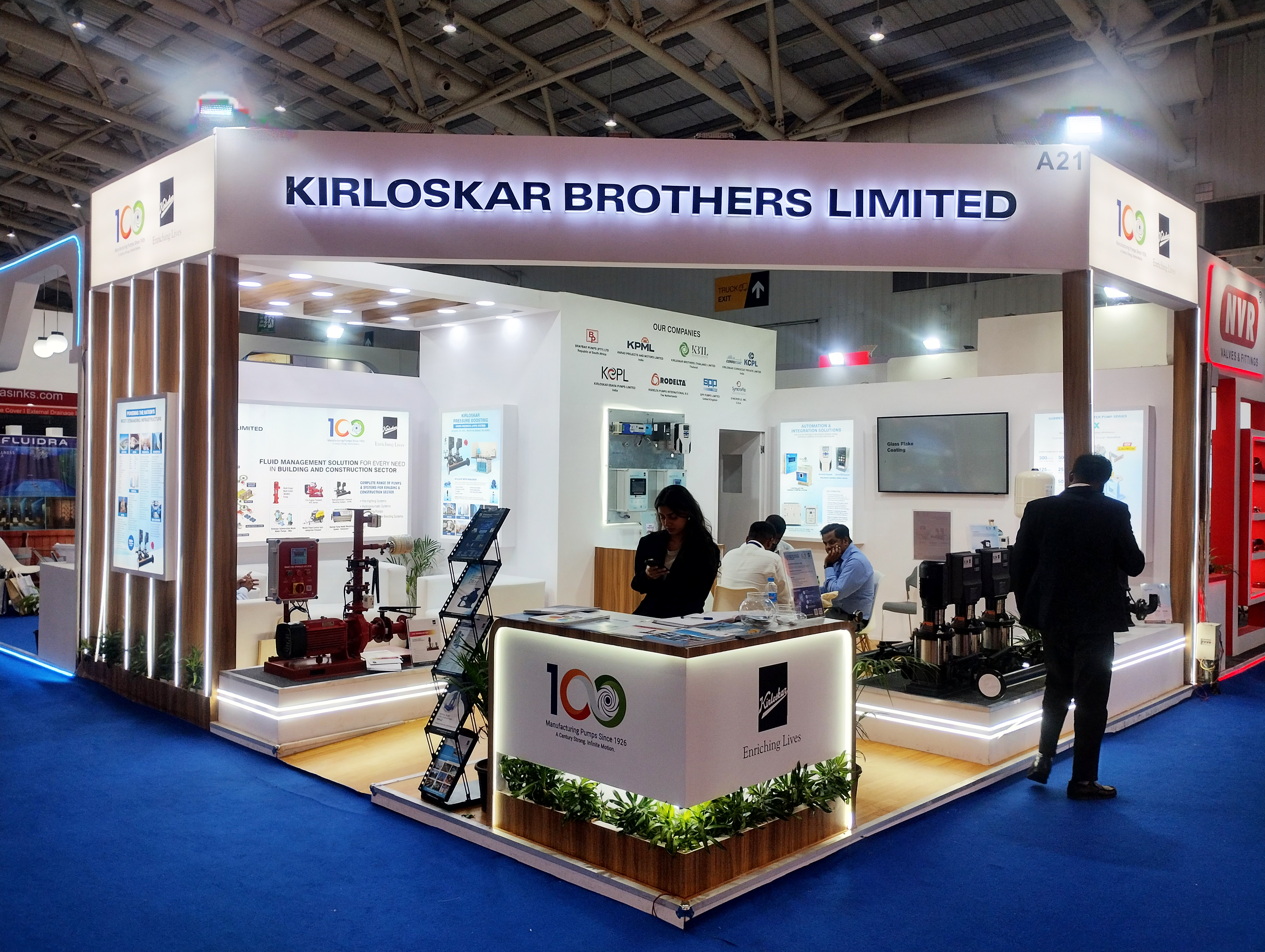
- Kirloskar Brothers Limited at Plumbex India 2026, BIEC
- Type: Public
- Traded as: BSE: 500241; NSE: KIRLOSBROS
- Industry: Pumps
- Founded: 1888
- Headquarters: Pune, Maharashtra, India
- Area served: Worldwide
- Key people: Sanjay Kirloskar (Chairman & MD)
- Products: Pumps; Foundry
- Revenue: $700 Million USD
- Number of employees: ~6000
- Website: www.kirloskarpumps.com

Kirloskar Brothers Limited (BSE: 500241 NSE: KIRLOSBROS) is a pump manufacturing company involved in engineering and manufacture of systems for fluid management. Established in 1888 in Kirloskarvadi and incorporated in 1920, Kirloskar Brothers Limited is the flagship company of the $2.5 billion Kirloskar Group. Kirloskar Brothers Limited provides fluid management solutions for large infrastructure projects in the areas of water supply, power plants, irrigation, oil & gas and marine & defence. The company engineers and manufactures industrial & petrochemical, agriculture & domestic pumps, valves and hydro turbines.

== History ==
The foundations of Kirloskar Brothers Limited, the flagship company of the Kirloskar Group, were established in 1888 by Laxmanrao Kirloskar and his partner Ramuanna. At the end of the 19th century, Laxmanrao worked with his brother, Ramuanna Kirloskar, to buy bicycles in Bombay and sell them in Belgaum, supplementing their income with bicycle lessons. Laxmanrao continued to build his business through partnering with a windmill agency, Samson Windmills, to sell windmills, making steel furniture for the local veterinary hospital, and electroplating a temple in Aundh. The Aundh electroplating job led to Laxmanrao being tasked with a major project: constructing an assembly hall adjoining the temple. This project fell through, however, in the context of financial uncertainty when the Aundh political leadership changed. The Kirloskar Brothers went on to create their first successful product, fodder-cutters, whose production grew swiftly, leading to the next product: iron ploughs for the agricultural economy. The 6 iron ploughs they initially manufactured went unsold for nearly two years before a Belgaum farmer (colloquially termed as Mr. Joshi) tested them out and asked the Kirloskar Brothers to fix their plough tips. After improving their ploughs, the Kirloskar Brothers saw great success with their iron plough sales.

A sudden Belgaum Municipality notice forced the Kirloskar Brothers Limited to close down their Belgaum factory. Luckily, Balasaheb Pant Pratinidhi, the same individual who gave Laxmanrao the Aundhi temple assembly hall contract many years earlier, helped the brothers set up a factory in Aundh. In 1910, Laxman and Ramuanna moved to this barren area of 32 acres. The area had no roads, power-lines, and drainage. This factory-village is known as Kirloskarvadi. Here, the Kirloskar Brothers moved into various other products that helped farmers. After suffering a shortage of materials during World War I, they introduced new products to the market in the 1920s. They introduced the "Kibro", a small drilling machine, "Kisan" sugar-cane crusher, and new ploughs. In addition to new farmer products, they started to develop other more general machinery to help government and corporations.

In November 1926 at the Industrial Exhibition held in Poona, KBL showcased the first diesel engine and centrifugal pump in India. The make of the engines were of such high quality, that a British officer asked whether they had been imported.

After receiving his bachelor's in mechanical engineering and returning from the United States in 1927, Laxmanrao's son, Shantanu Kirloskar, started to take a more active role in Kirloskar Brothers Limited. He redesigned the "Kisan" into the "Kamal" sugar-crusher achieving 77% juice extraction, higher than anyone else at the Industrial Exhibition in Kolhapur. During the Great Depression in India, Shantanu focused on developmental work creating water pumps for the Uttar Pradesh government, and a small sugar centrifuge for farmers. Around the 1940s, they started a new venture in Mysore, and established Kirloskar Mysore. This was the first new incorporation after Kirloskar Brothers Limited, and was the precedent for the expansion that would occur under Shantanu.

In 2025, KBL was involved in a legal dispute with Kirloskar Proprietary Ltd. (KPL) regarding the ownership and use of the “Kirloskar” trademark. KPL is the registered proprietor of the trademark, while KBL is a registered user under licensing arrangements within the Kirloskar group.

In March 2025, KBL filed a trademark infringement suit against Solid State Systems Pvt. Ltd. before the Bengaluru Commercial Court and obtained an ex-parte injunction. The case was filed without the knowledge or consent of KPL, which subsequently sought to be transposed as the plaintiff. The court allowed the request and removed KBL as the plaintiff, holding that the registered proprietor had the legal standing to pursue the case.

== Research and development ==
Kirloskar Brothers Limited carries out research in sump model studies, intake studies analysis using computational fluid dynamic techniques, surge analysis, cavitation studies, seismic analysis, vibration analysis, and transient analysis. The company has 17 patents since 2006.

== Major projects ==
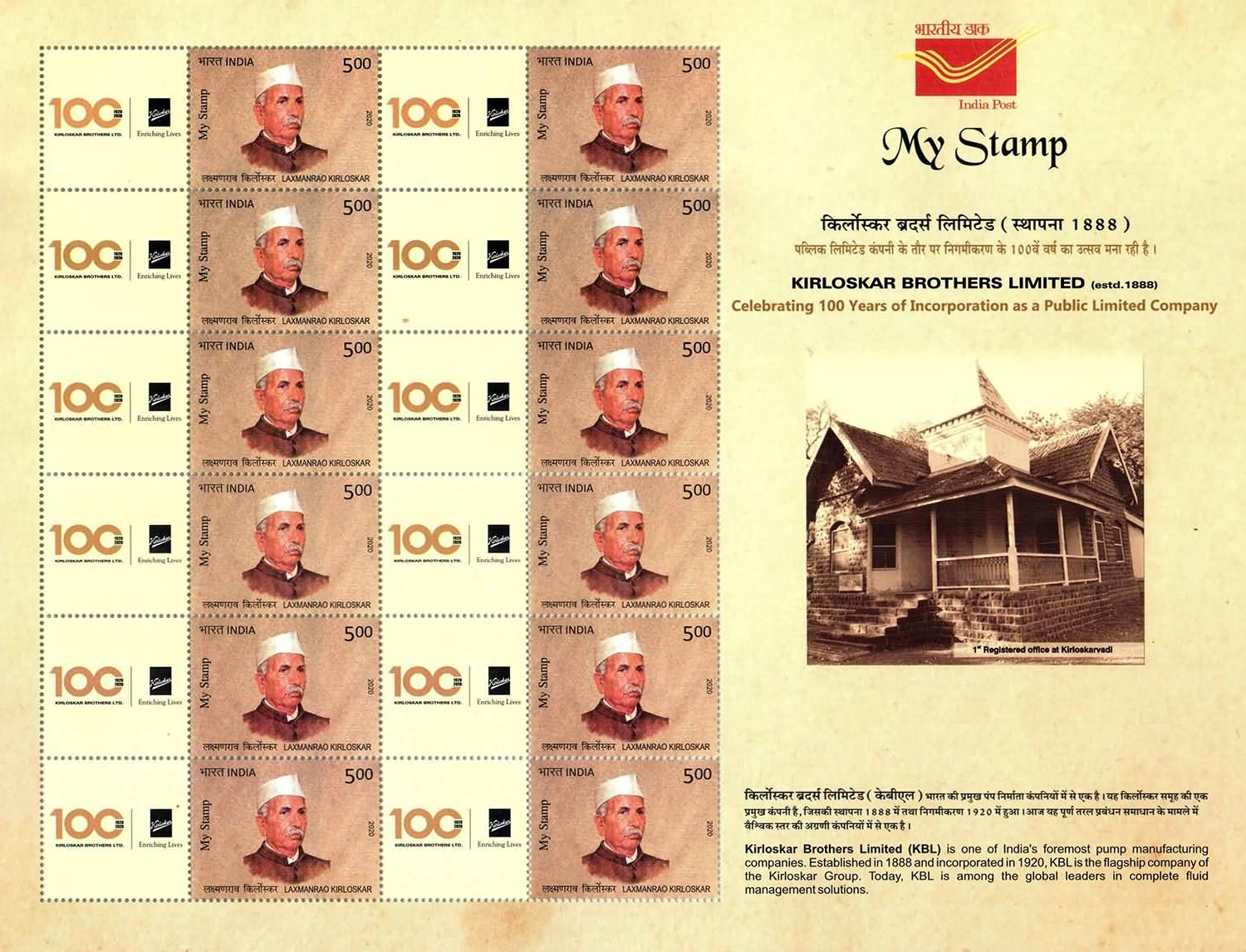
A 2020 stamp sheet of India dedicated to the 100th anniversary of Kirloskar Brothers. It features the founder Laxmanrao Kirloskar and the first office of the company, located at Kirloskarwadi

- KBL created the world's largest irrigation project at the time (March 2007). This was the Narmada Project implemented on behalf of the Gujarat Government.
- Kirloskar Brothers has been closely associated with India's nuclear program and has made canned motor pumps for pumping heavy water which are deployed at Indian Nuclear Power Plants.
- Kirloskar Brothers Ltd received the ASME N-STAMP in 2012 and is the first Indian company in rotating equipment to receive this as well as amongst a few companies in the world to have this accreditation
- Kirloskar Brothers Ltd is also one of the first pump companies to have an all women operated and managed manufacturing plant at Coimbatore, which is the second largest metropolitan city of state Tamil Nadu in India
- Kirloskar Brothers Ltd aided the Thai government in the 2018 Tham Luang cave rescue.

== Acquisitions ==
- In 2003 Kirloskar Brothers Ltd acquired SPP Pumps (UK), United Kingdom and established SPP INC, Atlanta, USA, as a wholly owned subsidiary of SPP, UK and expanded its international presence.
- In 2007, Kirloskar Brothers International B.V., The Netherlands and Kirloskar Brothers (Thailand) Ltd, a wholly owned subsidiary in Thailand were incorporated.
- In 2008, Kirloskar Brothers Ltd incorporated Kirloskar Pompen B.V. which acquired Rodelta Pumps International B.V. in 2015 in The Netherlands.
- In 2010 Kirloskar Brothers Ltd acquired Braybar Pumps, South Africa and in 2012 it established a manufacturing facility in Egypt as SPP MENA. KBL has joint venture cooperation with Ebara, Japan since 1988 under Kirloskar Ebara Pumps Ltd.
- Kirloskar is in licensee agreement with Corrocoat, UK since 2006 called Kirloskar corrocoat Pvt.Ltd.
- Kirloskar Brothers Ltd acquired The Kolhapur Steel Limited in 2007, Hematic Motors in 2010.
