= Laxmanrao Kirloskar =

Indian businessman (1869–1956)

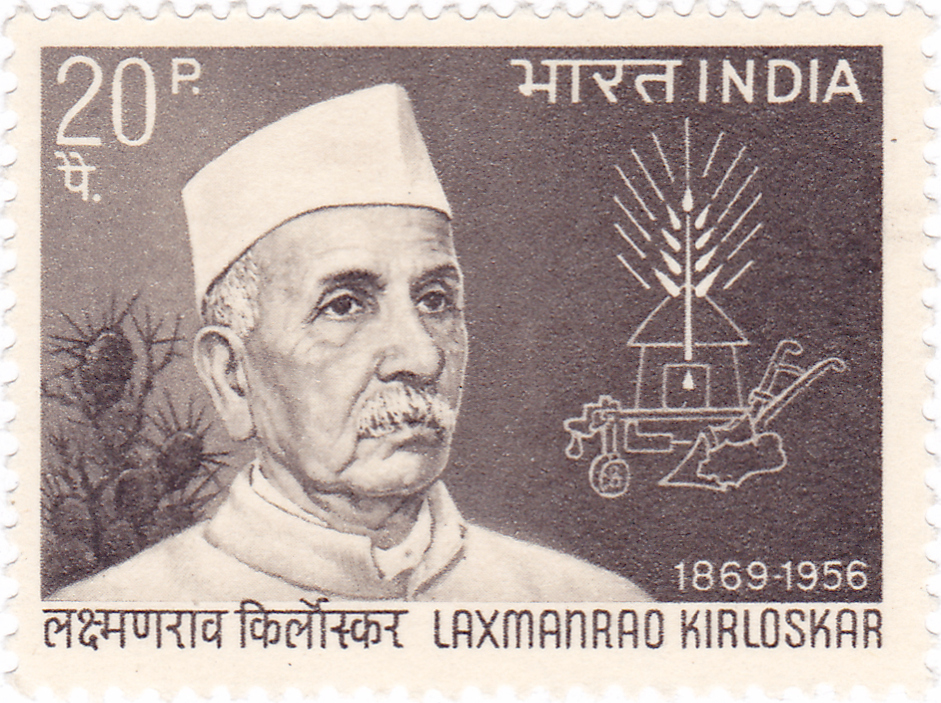
- Born: 20 June 1869; Gurlahosur, Bombay Presidency, British India (present–day Karnataka, India)
- Died: 26 September 1956 (aged 87)
- Occupations: Founder, Kirloskar Group
- Children: Shantanurao

Laxmanrao Kashinath Kirloskar (20 June 1869 – 26 September 1956) was an Indian businessman. He was the founder of the Kirloskar Group.

== Biography ==
Laxmanrao was born on 20 June 1869, in a Maharashtrian family in Gurlahosur, a village in Belgaum district of the erstwhile Bombay Presidency. He was a Maharashtrian Karhade Brahmin and his father Kashinathpant was a Vedant-Pandit. Therefore, the society also expected Laxmanrao to follow in the foot steps of his father. However, he broke away from the traditions and entered the field of engineering and technology.

Laxmanrao was fond of two things: mechanical objects and painting. Against his father’s wish and with financial support from his eldest brother Ramuanna, Laxmanrao joined J J School of Art in Bombay in 1885. Unfortunately, he had to quit after 2 years as he was found to be partially color-blind. He gave up painting but continued to study mechanical drawing at the institute. This skill came handy and lead him to a position of Assistant Teacher of Mechanical Drawing at Victoria Jubilee Technical Institute (VJTI) on a salary of Rs. 45 per month. Sometime in early 1890s Laxmanrao started bicycle dealership – he would buy bicycles in Bombay and send them to his brother Ramuanna in Belgaum where he would sell them. For a cycle of Rs. 700 to 1000 Ramuanna would also charge Rs. 15 for teaching how to ride.

His first venture – a small bicycle repair shop at Belgaum. The road on which he started the shop, is today named as Kirloskar Road. Strongly believing that agricultural implements must fit the milieu they are used in, he manufactured iron ploughs, the first Kirloskar products.

He established a small unit in the former Maratha empire for production of Chaff-cutters and manufacture of iron ploughs. In the early days, Kirloskar had to meet with opposition from farmers who believed that iron ploughs were poison to the land and make it useless. Superstitious farmers were extremely hard to convince and Laxmanrao Kirloskar took two years to sell his first iron ploughs. Laxmanrao Kirloskar could not find a suitable place for his workshop; help came from the Ruler of Aundh who offered him a place and arranging loan of seventeen thousand Indian rupees. In 1910, Laxmanrao started his factory in an arid waste land by the side of a renowned railway station, named Kundal Road. The factory now known as famous Kirloskar Industries and the station called as Kirloskarwadi. Laxmanrao Kirloskar was not only an industrialist but also a great social reformer. When blind orthodoxy was rampant in rural area, he advocated the removal of untouchability. He banned untouchability in the township that he had established at Kirloskarwadi which is in Palus . He believed in social reform and trusted in the goodness of man. He employed ex-convicts as night watchman.

He had read about industrial townships in Europe and America where the owners of industries had built communities for the employees. His dream was to build his own industry and community for his employees; he realized this dream with Kirloskarwadi, a place where he started the Kirloskar Brothers Limited factory in 1910.

== Personal life ==
Laxmanrao was married to Radhabai and had five children with her, sons Shantanurao, Rajaram, Prabhakar, Ravindra and a daughter.

== Legacy ==
Departments of Posts, Union Government of India issued a postal stamp for Laxmanrao Kirloskar on 20 June 1969 marking 100 years of birth anniversary. A lake and a road in Model Colony, Shivajinagar, Pune is also named after him, as Lakaki lake and Lakaki road, after his initials.
