= S. L. Kirloskar =

Indian businessman (1903–1994)

Shantanurao Laxmanrao Kirloskar
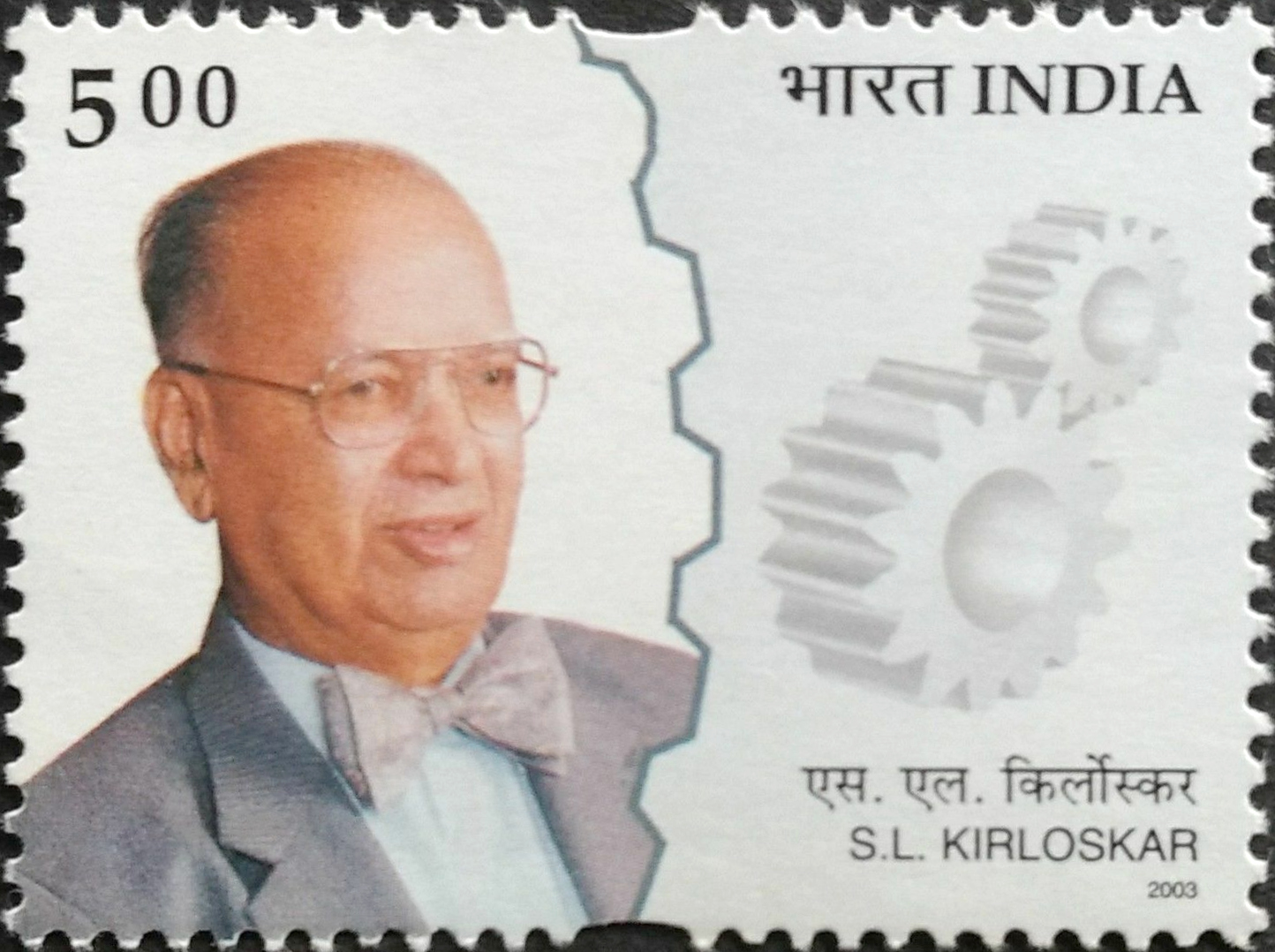
- Kirloskar on a 2003 stamp of India
- Born: 28 May 1903; Solapur, British India
- Died: 24 April 1994 (aged 90); Pune, Maharashtra, India
- Education: Massachusetts Institute of Technology (B.S.)
- Occupations: Chair, Kirloskar Group
- Spouse: Yamutai Kirloskar
- Children: Chandrakant Kirloskar; Srikant Kirloskar; Sarojini Amin
- Awards: Padma Bhushan (1965)

Shantanurao Laxmanrao Kirloskar (28 May 1903 – 24 April 1994) was an Indian businessman who was instrumental in the rapid growth of the Kirloskar Group.

S.L. Kirloskar was the son of Laxmanrao Kirloskar, who established the Kirloskar Group and the township of Kirloskarwadi. S. L. Kirloskar earned a Bachelor of Science degree in mechanical engineering from MIT in Cambridge, Massachusetts. He was among the first Indians to graduate from MIT. He also became a reserve officer in the US Army at the same time.

1940 S.L. Kirloskar founded Mysore Kirloskar Ltd. to manufacture machine tools.

After the end of World War II, the Kirloskar Group grew rapidly under the leadership of S.L. Kirloskar. In 1946 he established Kirloskar Electric Company and Kirloskar Oil Engines Limited at Bangalore and Pune, respectively. He is credited with developing the manufacture of the diesel engine indigenously as an import substitute after India attained independence. He penned an autobiography under the title Cactus and Roses.

Kirloskar was awarded Padma Bhushan in the year 1965 for his contribution to trade and industry.

On 26 February 2003 Atal Bihari Vajpayee, the then Prime Minister of India, released a commemorative postage stamp marking the 100th anniversary of Kirloskar's birth.

== Awards ==
- Rashtrabhushan Award of FIE Foundation, Ichalkaranji
