= Pulsometer pump =

British pump manufacturer

SPP Pumps Ltd
- Type: Private
- Industry: Pumps
- Founded: 1875
- Successor: Pumps; Coleford; SPP Pumps Ltd
- Headquarters: Coleford, Gloucestershire, United Kingdom
- Area served: Worldwide
- Key people: Alok Kirloskar (MD)
- Products: Pumps
- Revenue: $200 Million USD
- Number of employees: ~500
- Website: www.spppumps.com

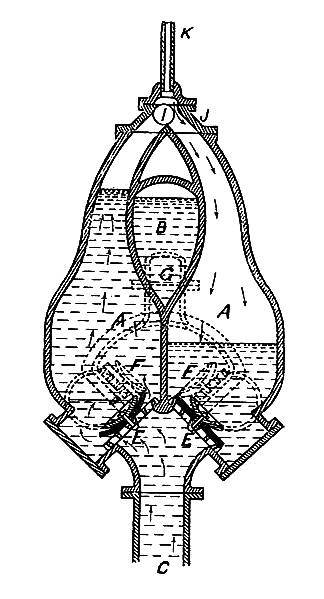
Pulsometer steam pump (drawing in a 1913 book)

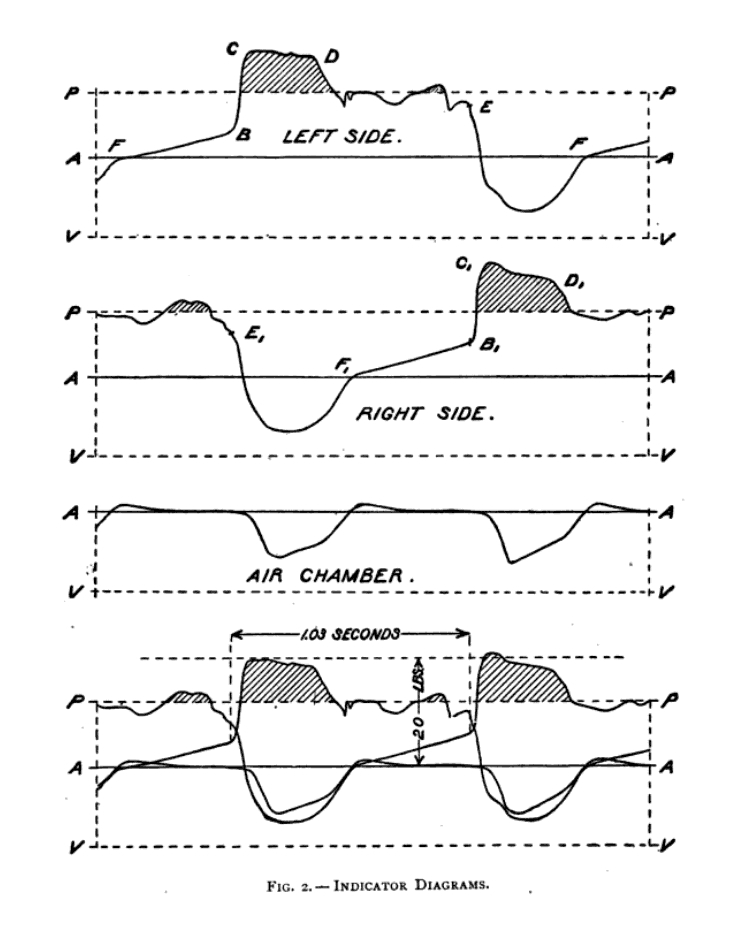
Chart showing pressure inside pulsometer pump

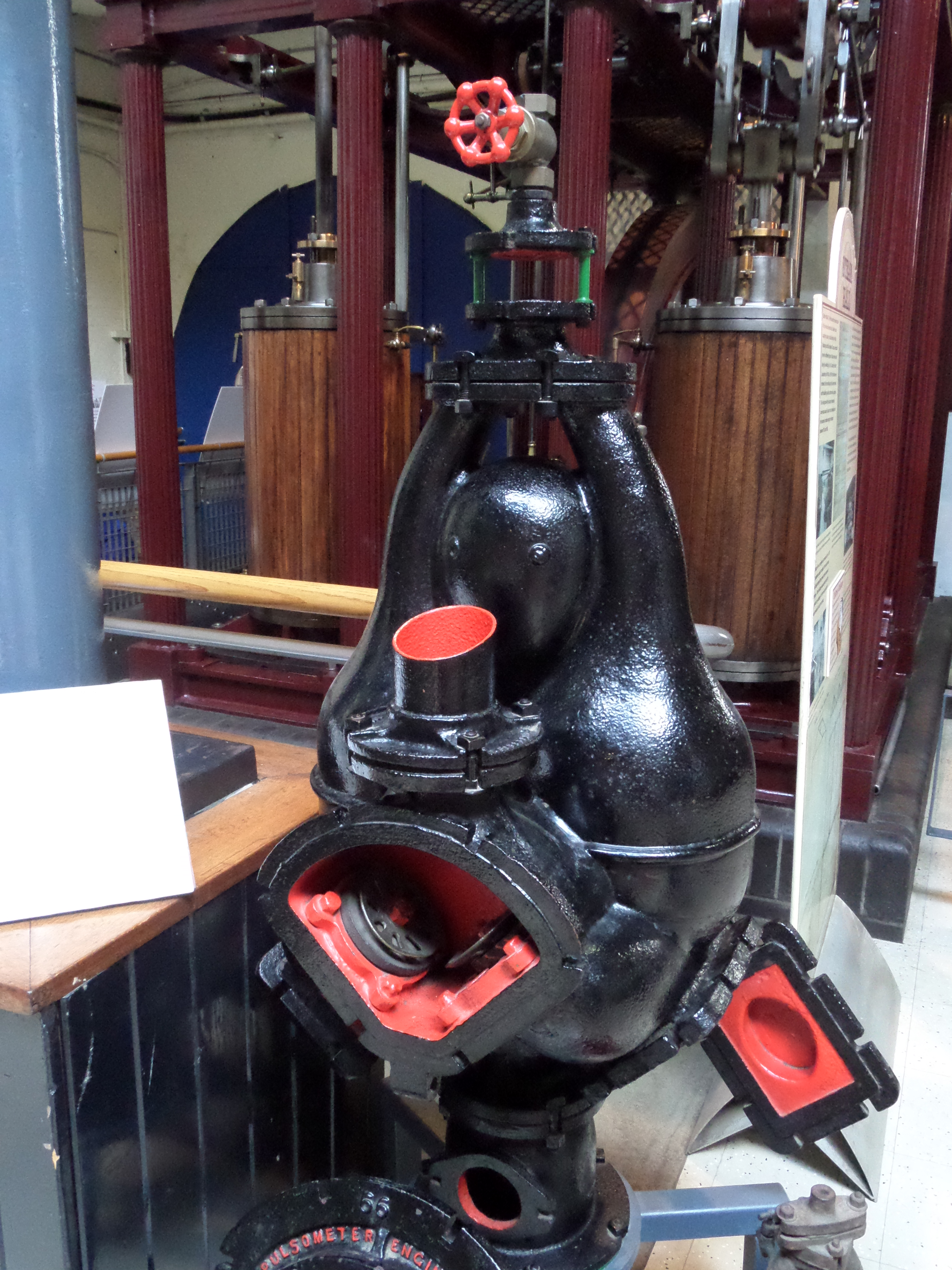
Pulsometer pump at the London Museum of Water & Steam

The Pulsometer steam pump is a pistonless pump which was patented in 1872 by American Charles Henry Hall. In 1875 a British engineer bought the patent rights of the Pulsometer and it was introduced to the market soon thereafter. The invention was inspired by the Savery steam pump invented by Thomas Savery. Around the turn of the century, it was a popular and effective pump for quarry pumping.

== Construction and operation ==
This extremely simple pump was made of cast iron, and had no pistons, rods, cylinders, cranks, or flywheels. It operated by the direct action of steam on water. The mechanism consisted of two chambers. As the steam condensed in one chamber, it acted as a suction pump, while in the other chamber, steam was introduced under pressure and so it acted as a force pump. At the end of every stroke, a ball valve consisting of a small brass ball moved slightly, causing the two chambers to swap functions from suction-pump to force-pump and vice versa. The result was that the water was first suction pumped and then force pumped.

A good explanation can be found in the 1901 article referenced below:

The operation of the pulsometer is as follows: The ball being at the entrance of the left-hand chamber, and the right-hand being full of water, steam enters, pressing on the surface of the water, and forcing it out through the discharge passage. A rapid condensation of steam occurs from contact with the water and with the walls of the chamber, previously cooled by the water. When the water level has reached the horizontal edge of the discharge passage, a large volume of steam suddenly escapes and is at once condensed by the relatively cold water between the chamber and the discharge valve. The pressure in the chamber quickly decreases; it cannot be sustained by steam from the boiler, for, in accordance with the inventor's first specifications, the steam pipe is small. If now the pressure in the left chamber is equal, or nearly equal, to that in the right, friction caused by the rapid flow of steam past the ball will draw the ball over and close the right-hand chamber. Cut off from further supply, the steam, in contact with water, begins to condense; a jet of cold water from the discharge pipe spurts up through the injection tube, and by breaking into spray against the side of the steam space, completes the condensation. The partial vacuum produced brings water through the suction valve to fill the chamber; but at the same time the air valve admits a little air, which passes up ahead of the water and forms an elastic cushion to prevent the water from striking violently against the steam ball. The air chamber is for the purpose of preventing water-hammer in the suction pipe.

== Advantages ==
The pump ran automatically without attendance. It was praised for its "extreme simplicity of construction, operation, compact form, high efficiency, economy, durability, and adaptability". Later designs were improved upon to enhance efficiency and to make the machine more accessible for inspection and repairs, thus reducing maintenance costs.

== Detailed analysis ==
In the January 1901 issue of Technology Quarterly and Proceedings of the Society of Arts, an article appeared by Joseph C. Riley describing key operational details and technical evaluation of the pulsometer pump's performance. Riley noted that although somewhat inefficient, the pulsometer's simplicity and robust construction made it well suited to pumping "thick liquids or semi-fluids, such as heavy syrups, or even liquid mud".

== Pulsometer Engineering Company Limited ==
Pulsometer Engineering Company Limited was founded in Britain in 1875 after a British engineer bought the patent rights of the pulsometer pump from Thomas Hall. In 1901 the company moved from London to Reading, Berkshire. In 1961 Pulsometer merged with Sigmund Pumps of Gateshead to form Sigmund Pulsometer Pumps. SPP Pumps Ltd became one of the largest pump companies in Europe. SPP Pumps Ltd is now part of Kirloskar Brothers Ltd.
