= Guardian minister (Maharashtra) =

Indian state government ministry

Guardian Ministers Maharashtra पालकमंत्री महाराष्ट्र

- Website: www.maharashtra.gov.in
- Committee: District Planning Committee
- Style: The Honourable
- Status: Head of District
- Appointed by: Governor of Maharashtra
- Nominated: Chief Minister
- Advice: Chief Minister
- Reports to: Governor; Chief Minister; Deputy Chief Minister; State Cabinet Committee Members
- Member of: Maharashtra Legislative Council; Maharashtra Legislative Assembly; StateCabinet Committee Members
- Term length: At the confidence of the assembly 5 years and is subject to no term limits
- Head of the State: Jishnu Dev Varma , (Governor of Maharashtra)
- Head of Government: Devendra Fadnavis, (Chief Minister)
- Deputy Head of Government: Eknath Shinde, (Deputy Chief Minister); Sunetra Pawar, (Deputy Chief Minister)
- Seat of Committee: District Council Office; District Collector's Office; Division Commissioner's Office; And All Government Office
- Guardian Secretary: District Collector
- Guardian Committee Members: President District Council; Vice-President District Council; Local Cabinet Minister's; Local Minister of State's; Local Member of Parliament, Rajya Sabha; Local Member of Parliament, Lok Sabha; Local Member of Maharashtra Legislative Council; Local Member of Maharashtra Legislative Assembly; Chief Executive Officer District Council; District Superintendent of Police; Department Chairman District Council; Member of District Council; Chairman of Panchayat Samiti; Leader of the Opposition District Council; Nominated Member of Ex. MPs, Ex. MLAs, Ex. MLCs; Special Invite Member; Government Officers in District

Guardian minister of Maharashtra is a cabinet-level minister in India appointed by a state government (Government of Maharashtra) to oversee the development of a specific district within the state. In Maharashtra state, the Third Devendra Fadnavis government has 20 guardian ministers, including the Chief Minister and the Deputy Chief Minister. The maximum number of ministers that the government can appoint is 43.

In Pune, the responsibilities of the Guardian minister extend beyond the typical duties. The minister is also required to lead the committee responsible for ensuring all necessary facilities during the annual pilgrimage from Alandi and Dehu to Pandharpur. The Guardian Minister also closely monitors the preparations during the Ganesh Festival.

A guardian minister is a cabinet-level minister in India appointed by a state government to oversee the development of a specific district within the state. The guardian minister oversees the execution of various state government schemes and programs in the district and ensures that the district's administration is functioning efficiently. The position is typically held by a senior politician from the ruling party who acts as a liaison between the central government and the district administration, ensuring that the district receives the necessary resources and support to meet its development goals. The individual who hold this position is typically an elected Member of the Legislative Assembly (MLA) or Cabinet minister who is designated to bring the personal attention of a minister to the development of that district.

If a district does not have representation in the state cabinet, an outsider can be appointed to serve as the guardian minister for that district. A minister may serve as the guardian minister for multiple districts.

== Roles and responsibilities ==
Guardian minister refers to a designated MLA (member of the legislative assembly) in a state government in India who is assigned responsibility for overseeing the development of a particular district. The role of the guardian minister is to bring personal attention and support to the district, working with the district collector and other officials to address local needs and promote growth.

The guardian minister is also the ex-officio chairperson of the District Planning Committee (DPC), which is responsible for addressing issues of common interest between panchayats (local government bodies) and municipalities, such as infrastructure development, resource sharing and environmental protection. The exact role and responsibilities of the DPC may vary by state, with some states headed by elected representatives and others led by administrative officials.

Guardian ministers are also responsible for coordinating solutions to various issues, including garbage disposal and facilitating land acquisition for large-scale projects such as highways, airports, industrial zones, waste processing plants, and water supply and sewage treatment. They are also tasked with monitoring the joint budget of all local civic bodies within the district.

They are expected to ensure the passing of a common draft budget and review its implementation quarterly. The Guardian Minister also plays a crucial role in ensuring the effective implementation of funds sanctioned by the central and state governments for various Schemes.

The Guardian minister is seen as a way for a political leader or party to increase their control over a district, as the minister is positioned close to the citizens and is able to interact with them directly.

== Removal ==
- Upon death
- Upon self resignation, or resignation or death of the Chief Minister
- Upon dismissal by the Governor for minister's unconstitutional acts per Article 75(2)
- Upon direction from the Judiciary for committing violation of law

== Guardian secretary ==
Guardian Secretary is a senior bureaucrat appointed by the state government, following the appointment of the guardian minister. Their role involves holding Lok Adalats, which are forums for addressing the grievances of citizens. The Guardian secretary is also responsible for coordinating with various government departments to resolve issues and ensure the implementation of development projects.

== Currently Guardian Ministers ==
District	Minister	Took office	Left office	Party	
Ahilya Nagar	Radhakrishna Vikhe Patil	18 January 2025	Incumbent	BJP	
Akola	Akash Fundkar	18 January 2025	Incumbent	BJP	
Amravati	Chandrashekhar Bawankule	18 January 2025	Incumbent	BJP	
Beed	Ajit Pawar (Dy Chief Minister)	18 January 2025	28 January 2026	NCP	
Beed	Devendra Fadnavis (Chief Minister) Additional Charge	28 January 2026	03 February 2026	BJP	
Beed	Sunetra Ajit Pawar (Dy Chief Minister)	03 February 2026	Incumbent	NCP	
Bhandara	Sanjay Savkare	18 January 2025	Incumbent	BJP	
Buldhana	Makrand Jadhav	18 January 2025	Incumbent	NCP	
Chandrapur	Ashok Uike	18 January 2025	Incumbent	BJP	
Chhatrapati Sambhaji Nagar	Sanjay Shirsat	18 January 2025	Incumbent	SHS	
Dharashiv	Pratap Sarnaik	18 January 2025	Incumbent	SHS	
Dhule	Jayakumar Rawal	18 January 2025	Incumbent	BJP	
Gadchiroli	Devendra Fadnavis (Chief Minister)	18 January 2025	Incumbent	BJP	
Gadchiroli	Ashish Jaiswal (co-in-charge)	18 January 2025	Incumbent	SHS	
Gondia	Indranil Naik	18 January 2025	Incumbent	NCP	
Hingoli	Narhari Zirwal	18 January 2025	Incumbent	NCP	
Jalgaon	Gulabrao Patil	18 January 2025	Incumbent	SHS	
Jalna	Pankaja Munde	18 January 2025	Incumbent	BJP	
Kolhapur	Prakashrao Abitkar	18 January 2025	Incumbent	SHS	
Kolhapur	Madhuri Misal (co-in-charge)	18 January 2025	Incumbent	BJP	
Latur	Shivendra Raje Bhosale	18 January 2025	Incumbent	BJP	
Mumbai City	Eknath Shinde (Dy Chief Minister)	18 January 2025	Incumbent	SHS	
Mumbai Suburban	Ashish Shelar	18 January 2025	Incumbent	BJP	
Mumbai Suburban	Mangal Prabhat Lodha (co-in-charge)	18 January 2025	Incumbent	BJP	
Nagpur	Chandrashekhar Bawankule	18 January 2025	Incumbent	BJP	
Nanded	Atul Save	18 January 2025	Incumbent	BJP	
Nandurbar	Manikrao Kokate	18 January 2025	18 December 2025	NCP	
Nandurbar	Ajit Pawar (Dy Chief Minister) (Additional Charge)	18 January 2025	28 January 2026	NCP	
Nandurbar	Devendra Fadnavis (Chief Minister) Additional Charge	28 January 2026	Incumbent	BJP	
Nashik	Girish Mahajan	17 August 2026	Incumbent	BJP	
Nashik				BJP	
Palghar	Ganesh Naik	18 January 2025	Incumbent	BJP	
Parbhani	Meghana Bordikar	18 January 2025	Incumbent	BJP	
Pune	Ajit Pawar (Dy Chief Minister)	18 January 2025	28 January 2026	NCP	
Pune	Devendra Fadnavis (Chief Minister) Additional Charge	28 January 2026	03 February 2026	BJP	
Pune	Sunetra Ajit Pawar (Dy Chief Minister)	03 February 2026	Incumbent	NCP	
Raigad				NCP	
Raigad	Bharatshet Gogawale	17 August 2026	Incumbent		SHS
Raigad				BJP	
Ratnagiri	Uday Samant	18 January 2025	Incumbent	SHS	
Sangli	Chandrakant Patil	18 January 2025	Incumbent	BJP	
Satara	Shambhuraj Desai	18 January 2025	Incumbent	SHS	
Sindhudurg	Nitesh Rane	18 January 2025	Incumbent	BJP	
Solapur	Jaykumar Gore	18 January 2025	Incumbent	BJP	
Thane	Eknath Shinde (Dy Chief Minister)	18 January 2025	Incumbent	SHS	
Wardha	Pankaj Bhoyar	18 January 2025	Incumbent	BJP	
Washim	Hasan Mushrif	18 January 2025	Incumbent	NCP	
Yavatmal	Sanjay Rathod	18 January 2025	Incumbent	SHS	

== Ahilyanagar District ==
  - Ahmednagar District

- Ashok Chavan
  (Cabinet Minister)
  18 October 1999 - 16 January 2003

- Shivajirao Moghe
  (Cabinet Minister)
  18 January 2003 - 01 November 2004

- Balasaheb Thorat
  (Cabinet Minister)
  01 November 2004 - 04 December 2008

- Radhakrishna Vikhe Patil
  (Cabinet Minister)
  08 December 2008 - 06 November 2009

- Balasaheb Thorat
  (Cabinet Minister)
  07 November 2009 - 10 November 2010

- Balasaheb Thorat
  (Cabinet Minister)
  11 November 2010 - 26 September 2014

- Ram Shinde
  (Minister of State 2014-2016) (Cabinet Minister 2016-2019)
  31 October 2014 - 04 November 2019

- Hasan Mushrif
  (Cabinet Minister)
  09 January 2020 - 29 June 2022

- Radhakrishna Vikhe Patil
  (Cabinet Minister)
  24 September 2022 - 26 November 2024

  - Ahilyanagar District

- Radhakrishna Vikhe Patil
  (Cabinet Minister)
  18 January 2025 - Incumbent

== Akola District ==
- Vasant Chavan
  (Cabinet Minister)
  18 October 1999 - 16 January 2003

- Ranjeet Deshmukh
  (Cabinet Minister)
  18 January 2003 - 01 November 2004

- Vimal Mundada
  (Cabinet Minister)
  01 November 2004 - 04 December 2008

- Surupsingh Hirya Naik
  (Cabinet Minister)
  08 December 2008 - 06 November 2009

- Subhash Zanak
  (Cabinet Minister)
  07 November 2009 - 10 November 2010

- Jayant Patil
  (Cabinet Minister)
  11 November 2010 - 26 September 2014

- Ranjit Patil
  (Minister of State)
  31 October 2014 - 04 November 2019

- Omprakash Babarao Kadu
  (Minister of State)
  09 January 2020 - 27 June 2022

- Amit Deshmukh Additional charge
  (Cabinet Minister)
  27 June 2022 - 29 June 2022

- Devendra Fadnavis
  (Deputy Chief Minister)
  27 September 2022 - 04 October 2023

- Radhakrishna Vikhe Patil
  (Cabinet Minister)
  04 October 2023 - 26 November 2024

- Akash Pandurang Fundkar
  (Cabinet Minister)
  18 January 2025 - Incumbent

== Amravati District ==
- Chhagan Bhujbal
  (Deputy Chief Minister)
  18 October 1999 - 16 January 2003

- Vijaysinh Mohite–Patil
  (Cabinet Minister 2003-2004)
  (Deputy Chief Minister 2004-2004)
  18 January 2003 - 01 November 2004

- Jayant Patil
  (Cabinet Minister)
  01 November 2004 - 04 December 2008

- Chandrakant Handore
  (Cabinet Minister)
  08 December 2008 - 06 November 2009

- Chhagan Bhujbal
  (Deputy Chief Minister)
  07 November 2009 - 10 November 2010

- Ajit Pawar
  (Deputy Chief Minister)
  11 November 2010 - 26 September 2014

- P. R. Pote Patil
  (Minister of State)
  31 October 2014 - 04 November 2019

- Yashomati Chandrakant Thakur
  (Cabinet Minister)
  09 January 2020 - 29 June 2022

- Devendra Fadnavis
  (Deputy Chief Minister)
  27 September 2022 - 04 October 2023

- Chandrakant Patil
  (Cabinet Minister)
  04 October 2023 - 26 November 2024

- Chandrashekhar Bawankule
  (Cabinet Minister)
  18 January 2025 - Incumbent

== Beed District ==
- Dilip Walse-Patil
  (Cabinet Minister)
  18 October 1999 - 16 January 2003

- Patangrao Kadam
  (Cabinet Minister)
  18 January 2003 - 01 November 2004

- Nawab Malik
  (Cabinet Minister)
  01 November 2004 - 04 December 2008

- Vimal Mundada
  (Cabinet Minister)
  08 December 2008 - 06 November 2009

- Subhash Zanak
  (Cabinet Minister)
  07 November 2009 - 10 November 2010

- R. R. Patil
  (Cabinet Minister)
  11 November 2010 - 26 September 2014

- Pankaja Munde
  (Cabinet Minister)
  31 October 2014 - 04 November 2019

- Dhananjay Munde
  (Cabinet Minister)
  09 January 2020 - 29 June 2022

- Atul Save
  (Cabinet Minister)
  27 September 2022 - 04 October 2023

- Dhananjay Munde
  (Cabinet Minister)
  04 October 2023 - 26 November 2024

- Ajit Pawar
  (Deputy Chief Minister)
  18 January 2025 - 28 January 2026

- Devendra Fadnavis Additional Charge
  (Chief Minister)
  28 January 2026 - 03 February 2026

- Sunetra Ajit Pawar
  (Deputy Chief Minister)
  03 February 2026 - Incumbent

== Bhandara District ==
Bhandara District भंडारा जिल्हा
- Website: bhandara.gov.in/en/
- District: Bhandara
- Administrative Division: Nagpur Division (better known as Vidarbha)
- Headquarters: Bhandara City
- Formed: 1 May 1960
- Tehsils: Total = 07: Bhandara; Tumsar; Pauni; Mohadi; Sakoli; Lakhani; Lakhandur
- Government Body: Bhandara Zilla Parishad
- Currently Guardian Minister: Vijaykumar Krishnarao Gavit (Cabinet Minister)
- Currently Guardian Secretary: Yogesh Kumbhejkar (IAS) (Collector and District Magistrate Bhandara)
- Lok Sabha MPs: Prashant Yadaorao Padole (11 Bhandara-Gondiya Lok Sabha)
- Assembly MLAs: Raju Manikrao Karemore (60 Tumsar Assembly); Narendra Bhondekar (61 Bhandara Assembly); Nana Patole (62 Sakoli Assembly)
- Area (km2): 3,717
- Population (2011 Census): 2,585,049
- % of State Population: 2.30%

== Buldhana District ==
Buldhana District बुलढाणा जिल्हा
- Website: buldhana.gov.in/en/
- District: Buldhana
- Administrative Division: Amravati Division (better known as Vidarbha)
- Headquarters: Buldhana City
- Formed: 01 May 1960
- Tehsils: Total = 13: Buldhana; Chikhli; Deulgaon Raja; Khamgaon; Shegaon; Malkapur; Motala; Nandura; Mehkar; Lonar; Sindkhed Raja; Jalgaon Jamod; Sangrampur
- Government Body: Buldhana Zilla Parishad
- Currently Guardian Minister: Dilip Walse-Patil (Cabinet Minister)
- Currently Guardian Secretary: Dr. Kiran Patil (IAS) (Collector and District Magistrate Buldhana)
- Lok Sabha MPs: Raksha Khadse (04 Raver Lok Sabha); Prataprao Ganpatrao Jadhav (05 Buldhana Lok Sabha)
- Assembly MLAs: Rajesh Panditrao Ekade (21 Malkapur Assembly); Sanjay Gaikwad (22 Buldhana Assembly); Shweta Mahale (23 Chikhali Assembly); Rajendra Shingne (24 Sindkhed Raja Assembly); Sanjay Bhashkar Raimulkar (25 Mehkar Assembly); Akash Pandurang Fundkar (26 Khamgaon Assembly); Sanjay Shriram Kute (27 Jalgaon (Jamod) Assembly)
- Area (km2): 9,661
- Population (2011 Census): 2,586,258
- % of State Population: 2.30%

== Chandrapur District ==
Chandrapur District चंद्रपूर जिल्हा
- Website: chandrapur.gov.in/en/
- District: Chandrapur
- Administrative Division: Nagpur Division (better known as Vidarbha)
- Headquarters: Chandrapur City
- Formed: 1 May 1960
- Tehsils: Total = 15: Chandrapur; Bhadravati; Warora; Chimur; Nagbhid; Bramhapuri; Sindewahi; Mul; Saoli; Gondpimpri; Rajura; Korpana; Pomburna; Ballarpur; Jivati
- Government Body: Chandrapur Zilla Parishad
- Currently Guardian Minister: Prof.(Dr). Ashok Uike (Cabinet Minister and MLA 77 Ralegaon Assembly)
- Currently Guardian Secretary: Sanjay Daine (IAS) (Collector and District Magistrate Chandrapur)
- Lok Sabha MPs: Namdeo Kirsan (12 Gadchiroli–Chimur Lok Sabha); Pratibha Dhanorkar (13 Chandrapur Lok Sabha)
- Assembly MLAs: Deorao Vithoba Bhongle (70 Rajura Assembly); Kishor Jorgewar (71 Chandrapur Assembly); Sudhir Mungantiwar (72 Ballarpur Assembly); Vijay Namdevrao Wadettiwar (73 Bramhapuri Assembly); Bunty Bhangdiya (74 Chimur Assembly); Karan Sanjay Deotale (75 Warora Assembly)
- Area (km2): 11,443
- Population (2011 Census): 2,204,307
- % of State Population: 1.96%
- Municipal Corporation: Chandrapur Municipal Corporation

== Chhatrapati Sambhajinagar District ==
Chhatrapati Sambhajinagar District छत्रपती संभाजी नगर जिल्हा
- Website: aurangabad.gov.in/en/
- District: Chhatrapati Sambhajinagar
- Previously Known: Aurangabad District औरंगाबाद जिल्हा
- Administrative Division: Chhatrapati Sambhajinagar Division (better known as Marathwada or Aurangabad division)
- Headquarters: Chhatrapati Sambhajinagar City
- Formed: 1 May 1960
- Tehsils: Total = 09: Chhatrapati Sambhajinagar; Paithan; Vaijapur; Gangapur; Khuldabad; Phulambri; Kannad; Sillod; Soegaon
- Government Body: Chhatrapati Sambhajinagar Zilla Parishad Aurangabad
- Currently Guardian Minister: Abdul Sattar Abdul Nabi; Additional Charge (Cabinet Minister)
- Currently Guardian Secretary: Dilip Swamy (IAS) (Collector and District Magistrate Chhatrapati Sambhajinagar)
- Lok Sabha MPs: Kalyan Kale (18 Jalna Lok Sabha); Sandipanrao Bhumre (19 Aurangabad Lok Sabha)
- Assembly MLAs: Abdul Sattar Abdul Nabi (104 Sillod Assembly); Udaysingh Rajput (105 Kannad Assembly); Vacant (106 Phulambri Assembly); Pradeep Jaiswal (107 Aurangabad Central Assembly); Sanjay Shirsat (108 Aurangabad West Assembly); Atul Moreshwar Save (109 Aurangabad East Assembly); Vacant (110 Paithan Assembly); Prashant Bamb (111 Gangapur Assembly); Ramesh Bornare (112 Vaijapur Assembly)
- Area (km2): 10,100
- Population (2011 Census): 3,701,282
- % of State Population: 3.29%
- Municipal Corporation: Chhatrapati Sambhajinagar Municipal Corporation Aurangabad

== Gondiya District ==
Gondia District गोंदिया जिल्हा
- Website: gondia.gov.in/en/
- District: Gondia
- Administrative Division: Nagpur Division (better known as Vidarbha)
- Headquarters: Gondia City
- Formed: 01 May 1999
- Tehsils: Total = 08: Gondia; Goregaon; Tirora; Arjuni Morgaon; Deori; Amgaon; Salekasa; Sadak Arjuni
- Government Body: Gondia Zilla Parishad
- Currently Guardian Minister: Indranil Naik (Cabinet Minister)
- Currently Guardian Secretary: Prajit Nair (IAS) (Collector and District Magistrate Gondia)
- Lok Sabha MPs: Prashant Yadaorao Padole (11 Bhandara-Gondiya Lok Sabha); Namdeo Kirsan (12 Gadchiroli–Chimur Lok Sabha)
- Assembly MLAs: Arjuni Morgaon (63 Arjuni Morgaon Assembly); Vijay Bharatlal Rahangdale (64 Tirora Assembly); Vinod Agrawal (65 Gondiya Assembly); Sahasram Maruti Korote (65 Amgaon Assembly)
- Area (km2): 5,234
- Population (2011 Census): 1,322,507
- % of State Population: 1.18%

== Gadchiroli District ==
Gadchiroli District गडचिरोली जिल्हा
- Website: gadchiroli.gov.in/en/
- District: Gadchiroli
- Administrative Division: Nagpur Division (better known as Vidarbha)
- Headquarters: Gadchiroli City
- Formed: 26 August 1982
- Tehsils: Total = 12: Gadchiroli; Armori; Chamorshi; Mulchera; Aheri, Gadchiroli; Sironcha; Etapalli; Bhamragad; Desaiganj; Dhanora; Kurkheda; Korchi
- Government Body: Gadchiroli Zilla Parishad
- Currently Guardian Minister: Devendra Fadnavis (Deputy Chief Minister)
- Currently Guardian Secretary: Sanjay Daine (IAS) (Collector and District Magistrate Gadchiroli)
- Lok Sabha MPs: Namdeo Kirsan (12 Gadchiroli–Chimur Lok Sabha)
- Assembly MLAs: Krishna Damaji Gajbe (67 Armori Assembly); Deorao Madguji Holi (68 Gadchiroli Assembly); Dharamraobaba Bhagwantrao Aatram (69 Aheri Assembly)
- Area (km2): 14,412
- Population (2011 Census): 1,072,942
- % of State Population: 0.95%

== Dhule District ==
Dhule District धुळे जिल्हा
- Website: dhule.gov.in/en/
- District: Dhule
- Administrative Division: Nashik Division (better known as North Maharashtra or Khandesh)
- Headquarters: Dhule City
- Formed: 01 May 1960
- Tehsils: Total = 14: Dhule City; Songir; Kusumba; Sakri; Pimpalner; Nizampur; Dondaicha City; Shindkheda; Nardana; Malpur; Shirpur city; Arthe; Thalner; Boradi
- Government Body: Dhule Zilla Parishad
- Currently Guardian Minister: Girish Mahajan (Cabinet Minister)
- Currently Guardian Secretary: Jitendra Papalkar. (IAS) (Collector and District Magistrate Dhule)
- Lok Sabha MPs: Gowaal Padavi (01 Nandurbar Lok Sabha); Shobha Bachhav (02 Dhule Lok Sabha)
- Assembly MLAs: Manjula Gavit (05 Sakri Assembly); Kunal Rohidas Patil (06 Dhule Rural Assembly); Shah Faruk Anwar (06 Dhule City Assembly); Jayakumar Jitendrasinh Rawal (07 Sindkheda Assembly); Kashiram Vechan Pawara (08 Shirpur Assembly)
- Area (km2): 7,195
- Population (2011 Census): 2,050,862
- % of State Population: 1.83%

== Dharashiv District ==
Dharashiv District धाराशिव जिल्हा
- Website: osmanabad.gov.in/en/
- District: Dharashiv
- Previously Known: Osmanabad District उस्मानाबाद जिल्हा
- Administrative Division: Chhatrapati Sambhajinagar Division (better known as Marathwada or Aurangabad division)
- Headquarters: Dharashiv City
- Formed: 1 May 1960
- Tehsils: Total = 08: Dharashiv; Tuljapur; Omerga; Lohara; Kalamb; Bhoom; Paranda; Washi
- Government Body: Dharashiv Zilla Parishad Osmanabad
- Currently Guardian Minister: Tanaji Sawant (Cabinet Minister)
- Currently Guardian Secretary: Dr. Sachin Ombase (IAS) (Collector and District Magistrate Dharashiv)
- Lok Sabha MPs: Omraje Nimbalkar (40 Osmanabad Lok Sabha)
- Assembly MLAs: Dnyanraj Chougule (240 Umarga Assembly); Ranajagjitsinha Patil (241 Tuljapur Assembly); Kailas Patil (242 Osmanabad Assembly); Tanaji Sawant (243 Paranda Assembly)
- Area (km2): 7,569
- Population (2011 Census): 1,657,576
- % of State Population: 1.48%

== Hingoli District ==
Hingoli District हिंगोली जिल्हा
- Website: hingoli.gov.in/en/
- District: Hingoli
- Administrative Division: Chhatrapati Sambhajinagar Division (better known as Marathwada or Aurangabad division)
- Headquarters: Hingoli City
- Formed: 01 May 1999
- Tehsils: Total = 06: Hingoli; Kalamnuri; Sengaon; Aundha Nagnath; Basmath
- Government Body: Hingoli Zilla Parishad
- Currently Guardian Minister: Abdul Sattar Abdul Nabi (Cabinet Minister)
- Currently Guardian Secretary: Abhinav Goel (IAS) (Collector and District Magistrate Hingoli)
- Lok Sabha MPs: Nagesh Bapurao Patil Ashtikar (15 Hingoli Lok Sabha)
- Assembly MLAs: Chandrakant Nawghare (92 Basmath Assembly); Santosh Bangar (93 Kalamnuri Assembly); Tanaji Sakharamji Mutkule (94 Hingoli Assembly)
- Area (km2): 4,526
- Population (2011 Census): 1,177,345
- % of State Population: 1.05%

== Jalna District ==
Jalna District जालना जिल्हा
- Website: jalna.gov.in/en/
- District: Jalna
- Administrative Division: Chhatrapati Sambhajinagar Division (better known as Marathwada or Aurangabad division)
- Headquarters: Jalna City
- Formed: 01 May 1981
- Tehsils: Total = 08: Jalna; Ambad; Bhokardan; Badnapur; Ghansawangi; Partur; Mantha; Jafrabad
- Government Body: Jalna Zilla Parishad
- Currently Guardian Minister: Atul Save (Cabinet Minister)
- Currently Guardian Secretary: Shrikrishnath Panchal (IAS) (Collector and District Magistrate Jalna)
- Lok Sabha MPs: Sanjay Haribhau Jadhav (17 Parbhani Lok Sabha); Kalyan Kale (18 Jalna Lok Sabha)
- Assembly MLAs: Babanrao Lonikar (99 Partur Assembly); Rajesh Tope (100 Ghansawangi Assembly); Kailas Gorantyal (101 Jalna Assembly); Narayan Tilakchand Kuche (102 Badnapur Assembly); Santosh Danve (103 Bhokardan Assembly)
- Area (km2): 7,687
- Population (2011 Census): 1,959,046
- % of State Population: 1.74%
- Municipal Corporation: Jalna Municipal Corporation

== Jalgaon District ==
Jalgaon District जळगाव जिल्हा
- Website: jalgaon.gov.in/en/
- District: Jalgaon
- Administrative Division: Nashik Division (better known as North Maharashtra or Khandesh)
- Headquarters: Jalgaon City
- Formed: 01 May 1960
- Tehsils: Total = 15: Jalgaon; Muktainagar; Bhusawal; Jamner; Chalisgaon; Bhadgaon; Dharangaon; Bodwad; Yawal; Raver; Amalner; Chopda; Parola; Pachora; Erandol
- Government Body: Jalgaon Zilla Parishad
- Currently Guardian Minister: Gulab Raghunath Patil (Cabinet Minister and MLA 14 Jalgaon Rural Assembly)
- Currently Guardian Secretary: Ayush Prasad (IAS) (Collector and District Magistrate Jalgaon)
- Lok Sabha MPs: Smita Wagh (03 Jalgaon Lok Sabha); Raksha Khadse (04 Raver Lok Sabha)
- Assembly MLAs: Latabai Sonawane (10 Chopda Assembly); Chaudhari Shirish Madhukarrao (11 Raver Assembly); Sanjay Waman Sawakare (12 Bhusawal Assembly); Suresh Damu Bhole (13 Jalgaon City Assembly); Gulab Raghunath Patil (14 Jalgaon Rural Assembly); Anil Bhaidas Patil (15 Amalner Assembly); Chimanrao Patil (16 Erandol Assembly); Mangesh Chavan (17 Chalisgaon Assembly); Kishor Appa Patil (18 Pachora Assembly); Girish Mahajan (19 Jamner Assembly); Chandrakant Nimba Patil (20 Muktainagar Assembly)
- Area (km2): 11,765
- Population (2011 Census): 4,229,917
- % of State Population: 3.76%
- Municipal Corporation: Jalgaon Municipal Corporation

=== List ===
Guardian Minister Update = 24 September 2022

No.	Portrait	Guardian_Minister	Constituency	Term of office			Political party	Home District	Portfolio	Ministry	Chief Minister
No.	Portrait	Guardian_Minister	Constituency	From	To	Period	Political party	Home District	Portfolio	Ministry	Chief Minister
Guardian Minister of Jalgaon
01		Anand Devkate (Cabinet Minister)	(MLA for Solapur South Constituency No. 251- Solapur District (Legislative Assembly)	19 October 1999	16 January 2003	3 years, 89 days	Indian National Congress	Solapur District	Minister of Animal Husbandry; Minister of Dairy Development	Deshmukh I	Vilasrao Deshmukh
02		Jayant Patil (Cabinet Minister)	(MLA for Walva Constituency No. 283- Sangli District) (Legislative Assembly)	18 January 2003	01 November 2004	1 year, 295 days	Nationalist Congress Party	Sangli District	Minister of Finance	Sushilkumar	Sushilkumar Shinde
03		Sureshdada Jain (Cabinet Minister)	(MLA for Jalgaon City Constituency No. 13- Jalgaon District (Legislative Assembly)	01 November 2004	01 December 2008	4 years, 30 days	Nationalist Congress Party	Jalgaon District	Minister of Higher and Technical Education	Deshmukh II	Vilasrao Deshmukh
04		Babanrao Pachpute (Cabinet Minister)	(MLA for Shrigonda Constituency No. 226- Ahmednagar District (Legislative Assembly)	08 December 2008	06 November 2009	333 days	Nationalist Congress Party	Ahmednagar District	Minister of Forests; Minister of Earthquake Rehabilitation	Ashok I	Ashok Chavan
05		Abdul Sattar Abdul Nabi (Minister of State)	(MLA for Sillod Constituency No. 104- Chhatrapati Sambhaji Nagar District Also Previously Known Aurangabad District (Legislative Assembly)	07 November 2009	10 November 2010	1 year, 3 days	Indian National Congress	Chhatrapati Sambhaji Nagar District Also Previously Known Aurangabad District	Deputy Minister of Food and Civil Supplies; Deputy Minister of Consumer Protection; Deputy Minister of Public Works (excluding Public Undertakings)	Ashok II	Ashok Chavan
06		Vijaykumar Gavit (Cabinet Minister)	(MLA for Nandurbar Constituency No. 03- Nandurbar District) (Legislative Assembly)	11 November 2010	19 March 2014	3 years, 128 days	Nationalist Congress Party	Nandurbar District	Minister of Medical Education; Minister of Horticulture; Minister of Employment Guarantee	Prithviraj	Prithviraj Chavan
07		Dilip Gangadhar Sopal (Cabinet Minister)	(MLA for Barshi Constituency No. 246- Osmanabad District) (Legislative Assembly)	19 March 2014	26 September 2014	191 days	Independent Supported Party Indian National Congress	Osmanabad District	Minister of Water Supply; Minister of Sanitation	Prithviraj	Prithviraj Chavan
08		Eknath Khadse (Cabinet Minister)	(MLA for Muktainagar Constituency No. 20- Jalgaon District) (Legislative Assembly)	05 December 2014	04 June 2016	1 year, 182 days	Bharatiya Janata Party	Jalgaon District	Minister of Revenue; Minister of Relief & Rehabilitation; Minister of Disaster Management; Minister of Horticulture; Minister of Agriculture; Minister of Earthquake Rehabilitation; Minister of Minority Development and Aukaf; Minister for State Border Defence (First); Minister of Animal Husbandry; Minister of Fisheries; Minister of Dairying; Minister of State Excise; Minister of Skill Development and Entrepreneurship	Fadnavis I	Devendra Fadnavis
09		Girish Mahajan (Cabinet Minister)	(MLA for Jamner Constituency No. 19- Jalgaon District) (Legislative Assembly)	04 June 2016	12 November 2019	3 years, 161 days	Bharatiya Janata Party	Jalgaon District	Minister of Medical Education; Minister of Water Resources; Minister of Command Area Development	Fadnavis I	Devendra Fadnavis
10		Gulab Raghunath Patil (Cabinet Minister)	(MLA for Jalgaon Rural Constituency No. 14- Jalgaon District (Legislative Assembly)	09 January 2020	27 June 2022	2 years, 169 days	Shiv Sena	Jalgaon District	Minister of Water Supply; Minister of Sanitation	Thackeray	Uddhav Thackeray
11		Aaditya Thackeray (Cabinet Minister); Additional Charge	(MLA for Worli Constituency No. 182- Mumbai City District (Legislative Assembly)	27 June 2022	29 June 2022	2 days	Shiv Sena	Mumbai City District	Minister of Environment and Climate Change; Minister of Tourism; Minister of Protocol; Minister of Higher Education and Technical Education	Thackeray	Uddhav Thackeray
12		Gulab Raghunath Patil (Cabinet Minister)	(MLA for Jalgaon Rural Constituency No. 14- Jalgaon District (Legislative Assembly)	24 September 2022	5 December 2024	2 years, 72 days	Shiv Sena (Shinde Group)	Jalgaon District	Minister of Water Supply; Minister of Sanitation	Eknath	Eknath Shinde
(12)		Gulab Raghunath Patil (Cabinet Minister)	(MLA for Jalgaon Rural Constituency No. 14- Jalgaon District (Legislative Assembly)	18 January 2025	Incumbent	1 year, 253 days	Shiv Sena (Shinde Group)	Jalgaon District	Minister of Water Supply; Minister of Sanitation	Fadnavis III	Devendra Fadnavis

== Kolhapur District ==
Kolhapur District कोल्हापूर जिल्हा
- Website: kolhapur.gov.in/en/
- District: Kolhapur
- Administrative Division: Pune Division (better known as Paschim Maharashtra or Desh)
- Headquarters: Kolhapur City
- Formed: 01 May 1960
- Tehsils: Total = 12: Gadhinglaj; Karveer; Bhudargad; Panhala; Kagal; Shirol; Hatkanangale; Ajara; Chandgad; Gaganbawada; Radhanagari; Shahuwadi
- Government Body: Kolhapur Zilla Parishad
- Currently Guardian Minister: Prakashrao Abitkar (Cabinet Minister)
- Currently Guardian Secretary: Amol Yedge (IAS) (Collector and District Magistrate)
- Lok Sabha MPs: Chhatrapati Shahu Maharaj (47 Kolhapur Lok Sabha); Dhairyasheel Sambhajirao Mane (48 Hatkanangle Lok Sabha)
- Assembly MLAs: Rajesh Narasingrao Patil (271 Chandgad Assembly); Prakashrao Abitkar (272 Radhanagari Assembly); Hasan Mushrif (273 Kagal Assembly); Ruturaj Patil (274 Kolhapur South Assembly); Vacant (275 Karvir Assembly); Jayshri Jadhav (276 Kolhapur North Assembly); Vinay Kore (277 Shahuwadi Assembly); Raju Awale (278 Hatkanangle Assembly); Prakashanna Awade (279 Ichalkaranji Assembly); Rajendra Patil (280 Shirol Assembly)
- Area (km2): 7,685
- Population (2011 Census): 3,876,001
- % of State Population: 3.45%
- Municipal Corporation: Kolhapur Municipal Corporation; Ichalkaranji Municipal Corporation

== Latur District ==
Latur District लातूर जिल्हा
- Website: latur.gov.in/en/
- District: Latur
- Administrative Division: Chhatrapati Sambhajinagar Division (better known as Marathwada or Aurangabad division)
- Headquarters: Latur City
- Formed: 16 August 1982
- Tehsils: Total = 10: Latur; Ahmadpur; Ausa; Nilanga; Renapur; Chakur; Deoni; Shirur Anantpal; Udgir; Jalkot
- Government Body: Latur Zilla Parishad
- Currently Guardian Minister: Girish Mahajan (Cabinet Minister)
- Currently Guardian Secretary: Varsha Thakur-Ghuge (IAS) (Collector and District Magistrate Latur)
- Lok Sabha MPs: Shivaji Bandappa Kalge (41 Latur Lok Sabha)
- Assembly MLAs: Dhiraj Deshmukh (234 Latur Rural Assembly); Amit Deshmukh (235 Latur City Assembly); Babasaheb Patil (236 Ahmedpur Assembly); Sanjay Bansode (237 Udgir Assembly); Sambhaji Patil Nilangekar (238 Nilanga Assembly); Abhimanyu Dattatray Pawar (239 Ausa Assembly)
- Area (km2): 7,157
- Population (2011 Census): 2,454,196
- % of State Population: 2.18%
- Municipal Corporation: Latur Municipal Corporation

== Mumbai City District ==
Mumbai City District मुंबई शहर जिल्हा
- Website: mumbaicity.gov.in/en/
- District: Mumbai City
- Administrative Division: Konkan Division
- Headquarters: Mumbai City
- Formed: 1 May 1960
- Tehsils: Total = 00
- Government Body: Brihanmumbai Municipal Corporation
- Currently Guardian Minister: Deepak Kesarkar (Cabinet Minister)
- Currently Guardian Secretary: Sanjay Yadav (IAS) (Collector and District Magistrate)
- Lok Sabha MPs: Anil Desai (Mumbai South Central Lok Sabha); Arvind Sawant (Mumbai South Lok Sabha)
- Assembly MLAs: Vacant (178 Dharavi Assembly); R. Tamil Selvan (179 Sion Koliwada Assembly); Kalidas Kolambkar (180 Wadala Assembly); Sada Sarvankar (181 Mahim Assembly); Aditya Thackeray (182 Worli Assembly); Ajay Choudhari (183 Shivadi Assembly); Yamini Jadhav (184 Byculla Assembly); Mangal Prabhat Lodha (185 Malabar Hill Assembly); Amin Patel (186 Mumbadevi Assembly); Rahul Narwekar (187 Colaba Assembly)
- Area (km2): 157
- Population (2011 Census): 3,085,411
- % of state Population: 2.75%
- Municipal Corporation: Brihanmumbai Municipal Corporation

=== List ===
Guardian Minister Update = 24 September 2022

No.	Portrait	Guardian_Minister	Constituency	Term of office			Political party	Home District	Portfolio	Ministry	Chief Minister
No.	Portrait	Guardian_Minister	Constituency	From	To	Period	Political party	Home District	Portfolio	Ministry	Chief Minister
Guardian Minister of Mumbai City
01		R. R. Patil (Cabinet Minister)	(MLA for Tasgaon-Kavathe Mahankal Constituency No. 287- Sangli District) (Legislative Assembly)	19 October 1999	16 January 2003	3 years, 89 days	Nationalist Congress Party	Sangli District	Minister of Rural Development; Minister of Panchayat Raj; Minister of Water Supply; Minister of Cleanliness	Deshmukh I	Vilasrao Deshmukh
02		R. R. Patil (Cabinet Minister)	(MLA for Tasgaon-Kavathe Mahankal Constituency No. 287- Sangli District) (Legislative Assembly)	18 January 2003	01 November 2004	1 year, 295 days	Nationalist Congress Party	Sangli District	Minister for Home Affairs; Minister of State Border Defence (First); Minister of Majority Welfare	Sushilkumar	Sushilkumar Shinde
03		Chhagan Bhujbal (Cabinet Minister)	(MLA for Yevla Constituency No. 119- Nashik District) (Legislative Assembly)	01 November 2004	01 December 2008	4 years, 30 days	Nationalist Congress Party	Nashik District	Minister of Public Works (Excluding Public Undertakings)	Deshmukh II	Vilasrao Deshmukh
04		Jayant Patil (Cabinet Minister)	(MLA for Walva Constituency No. 283- Sangli District) (Legislative Assembly)	08 December 2008	06 November 2009	333 days	Nationalist Congress Party	Sangli District	Minister for Home Affairs	Ashok I	Ashok Chavan
05		Jayant Patil (Cabinet Minister)	(MLA for Islampur Constituency No. 283- Sangli District) (Legislative Assembly)	07 November 2009	10 November 2010	1 year, 3 days	Nationalist Congress Party	Sangli District	Minister of Rural Development.; Minister of Panchayat Raj; Minister of Environment and Climate change.; Minister for State Border Defence; (Second)	Ashok II	Ashok Chavan
06		R. R. Patil (Cabinet Minister)	(MLA for Tasgaon-Kavathe Mahankal Constituency No. 287- Sangli District) (Legislative Assembly)	11 November 2010	26 September 2014	3 years, 319 days	Nationalist Congress Party	Sangli District	Minister for Home Affairs; Minister of Ex. Servicemen Welfare	Prithviraj	Prithviraj Chavan
07		Subhash Desai (Cabinet Minister)	(MLC for Elected by MLAs Constituency No. 09 - Mumbai Suburban District) (Legislative Council)	05 December 2014	12 November 2019	4 years, 342 days	Shiv Sena	Mumbai Suburban District	Minister of Industries; Minister of Mining Department; Minister of Majority Welfare Development	Fadnavis I	Devendra Fadnavis
08		Aslam Shaikh (Cabinet Minister)	(MLA for Malad West Constituency No. 162- Mumbai Suburban District) (Legislative Assembly)	09 January 2020	29 June 2022	2 years, 171 days	Indian National Congress	Mumbai Suburban District	Minister of Textiles; Minister of Fisheries Department; Minister for Ports Development	Thackeray	Uddhav Thackeray
09		Deepak Vasant Kesarkar (Cabinet Minister)	(MLA for Sawantwadi Constituency No. 270- Sindhudurg District) (Legislative Assembly)	24 September 2022	5 December 2024	2 years, 72 days	Shiv Sena (Shinde Group)	Sindhudurg District	Minister of School Education; Minister of Marathi Language	Eknath	Eknath Shinde
10		Eknath Shinde (Deputy Chief Minister)	(MLA for Sawantwadi Constituency No. 270- Thane District) (Legislative Assembly)	16 January 2025	Incumbent	1 year, 255 days	Shiv Sena (Shinde Group)	Thane district	Minister of School Education; Minister of Marathi Language	Fadnavis III	Devendra Fadnavis

== Mumbai Suburban District ==
Mumbai Suburban District मुंबई उपनगर जिल्हा
- Website: mumbaisuburban.gov.in/en/
- District: Mumbai Suburban
- Administrative Division: Konkan Division
- Headquarters: Bandra City
- Formed: 1 October 1990
- Tehsils: Total = 03: Kurla; Andheri; Borivali
- Government Body: Brihanmumbai Municipal Corporation
- Currently Guardian Minister: Mangal Lodha (Cabinet Minister)
- Currently Guardian Secretary: Rajendra Shankar Kshirsagar (IAS) (Collector and District Magistrate Mumbai Suburban)
- Lok Sabha MPs: Piyush Goyal (26 Mumbai North Lok Sabha); Ravindra Waikar (27 Mumbai North West Lok Sabha); Sanjay Dina Patil (28 Mumbai North East Lok Sabha); Varsha Gaikwad (29 Mumbai North Central Lok Sabha)
- Assembly MLAs: Sunil Rane (152 Borivali Assembly); Manisha Chaudhary (153 Dahisar Assembly); Prakash Surve (154 Magathane Assembly); Mihir Kotecha (155 Mulund Assembly); Sunil Raut (156 Vikhroli Assembly); Ramesh Korgaonkar (157 Bhandup West Assembly); Vacant (158 Jogeshwari East Assembly); Sunil Prabhu (159 Dindoshi Assembly); Atul Bhatkhalkar (160 Kandivali East Assembly); Yogesh Sagar (161 Charkop Assembly); Aslam Shaikh (162 Malad West Assembly); Vidya Thakur (163 Goregaon Assembly); Bharati Hemant Lavekar (164 Versova Assembly); Ameet Bhaskar Satam (165 Andheri West Assembly); Rutuja Ramesh Latke (166 Andheri East Assembly); Parag Alavani (167 Vile Parle Assembly); Dilip Lande (168 Chandivali Assembly); Ram Kadam (169 Ghatkopar West Assembly); Parag Shah (170 Ghatkopar East Assembly); Abu Asim Azmi (171 Mankhurd Shivaji Nagar Assembly); Nawab Malik (172 Anushakti Nagar Assembly); Prakash Phaterpekar (173 Chembur Assembly); Mangesh Kudalkar (174 Kurla Assembly); Sanjay Potnis (175 Kalina Assembly); Zeeshan Siddique (176 Vandre East Assembly); Ashish Shelar (177 Vandre West Assembly)
- Area (km2): 446
- Population (2011 Census): 9,356,962
- % of state Population: 8.33%
- Municipal Corporation: Brihanmumbai Municipal Corporation

=== List ===
Guardian Minister Update = 24 September 2022

No.	Portrait	Guardian_Minister	Constituency	Term of office			Political party	Home District	Portfolio	Ministry	Chief Minister
No.	Portrait	Guardian_Minister	Constituency	From	To	Period	Political party	Home District	Portfolio	Ministry	Chief Minister
Guardian Minister of Mumbai Suburban
01		Ranjeet Deshmukh (Cabinet Minister)	(MLC for Elected by MLAs Constituency No. 16 - Nagpur District) (Legislative Council)	19 October 1999	16 January 2003	3 years, 89 days	Indian National Congress	Nagpur District	Minister of Agriculture; Minister of Textile; Minister of Khar Land Development	Deshmukh I	Vilasrao Deshmukh
02		Husain Dalwai (Cabinet Minister)	(MLA for Ratnagiri Khed Constituency No. 266- Ratnagiri District) (Legislative Assembly)	18 January 2003	01 November 2004	1 year, 295 days	Indian National Congress	Ratnagiri District	Minister of Minority Development and Aukaf; Minister for State Border Defence (Second)	Sushilkumar	Sushilkumar Shinde
03		Chandrakant Handore (Cabinet Minister)	(MLA for Chembur Constituency No. 173- Mumbai Suburban District (Legislative Assembly)	01 November 2004	01 December 2008	4 years, 30 days	Indian National Congress	Mumbai Suburban District	Minister of Social Justice; Minister of Parliamentary Affairs	Deshmukh II	Vilasrao Deshmukh
04		Anees Ahmed (Cabinet Minister)	(MLA for Nagpur Central Constituency No. 55- Nagpur District (Legislative Assembly)	08 December 2008	06 November 2009	333 days	Indian National Congress	Sangli Nagpur	Minister of Textiles; Minister of Minority Development and Aukaf; Minister of Parliamentary Affairs	Ashok I	Ashok Chavan
05		Mohammed Arif Naseem Khan (Cabinet Minister)	(MLA for Chandivali Constituency No. 168- Mumbai Suburban District) (Legislative Assembly)	07 November 2009	10 November 2010	1 year, 3 days	Indian National Congress	Mumbai Suburban District	Minister of Textiles; Minister of Minority Development and Aukaf; Minister of Skill Development And Entrepreneurship; Minister of Ex. Servicemen Welfare	Ashok II	Ashok Chavan
06		Mohammed Arif Naseem Khan (Cabinet Minister)	(MLA for Chandivali Constituency No. 168- Mumbai Suburban District) (Legislative Assembly)	11 November 2010	26 September 2014	3 years, 319 days	Indian National Congress	Mumbai Suburban District	Minister of Textiles; Minister of Minority Development and Aukaf; Minister of Marketing	Prithviraj	Prithviraj Chavan
07		Vinod Tawde (Cabinet Minister)	(MLA for Borivali Constituency No. 152- Mumbai Suburban District (Legislative Assembly)	05 December 2014	12 November 2019	4 years, 342 days	Bharatiya Janata Party	Mumbai Suburban District	Minister of Higher and Technical Education; Minister of Cultural Affairs; Minister of Marathi Language; Minister of Medical Education; Minister of School Education; Minister of Minister of Sports & Youth Welfare; Minister for State Border Defence (First); Minister of Minority Development and Aukaf; Minister of Parliamentary Affairs	Fadnavis I	Devendra Fadnavis
08		Aaditya Thackeray (Cabinet Minister)	(MLA for Worli Constituency No. 182- Mumbai City District (Legislative Assembly)	09 January 2020	29 June 2022	2 years, 171 days	Shiv Sena	Mumbai City District	Minister of Environment and Climate Change; Minister of Tourism; Minister of Protocol	Thackeray	Uddhav Thackeray
09		Mangal Lodha (Cabinet Minister)	(MLA for Malabar Hill Constituency No. 185- Mumbai City District) (Legislative Assembly)	24 September 2022	5 December 2024	2 years, 72 days	Bharatiya Janata Party	Mumbai City District	Minister of Skill Development, Employment and Entrepreneurship	Eknath	Eknath Shinde
10		Ashish Shelar (Cabinet Minister)	(MLA for Vandre West Constituency No. 177- Mumbai Suburban District) (Legislative Assembly)	18 January 2025	Incumbent	1 year, 253 days	Bharatiya Janata Party	Mumbai Suburban district	Minister of Information Technology, Cultural Affairs	Fadnavis	Devendra Fadnavis

== Nagpur District ==
Nagpur District नागपूर जिल्हा
- Website: nagpur.gov.in/en/
- District: Nagpur
- Administrative Division: Nagpur Division (better known as Vidarbha)
- Headquarters: Nagpur City
- Formed: 01 May 1960
- Tehsils: Total = 14: Ramtek; Umred; Kalameshwar; Katol; Kamthi; Kuhi; Narkhed; Nagpur; Nagpur (Rural); Parseoni; Bhiwapur; Mouda; Savner; Hingna
- Government Body: Nagpur Zilla Parishad
- Currently Guardian Minister: Devendra Fadnavis (Deputy Chief Minister and MLA Nagpur South West Assembly)
- Currently Guardian Secretary: Dr. Vipin Itankar (IAS) (Collector and District Magistrate)
- Lok Sabha MPs: Shyamkumar (Bablu) Barve (09 Ramtek Lok Sabha); Nitin Gadkari (10 Nagpur Lok Sabha)
- Assembly MLAs: Anil Deshmukh (48 Katol Assembly); Vacant (49 Savner Assembly); Sameer Meghe (50 Hingna Assembly); Vacant (51 Umred Assembly); Devendra Fadnavis (52 Nagpur South West Assembly); Mohan Mate (53 Nagpur South Assembly); Krishna Khopde (54 Nagpur East Assembly); Vikas Kumbhare (55 Nagpur Central Assembly); Vikas Pandurang Thakre (56 Nagpur West Assembly); Nitin Raut (57 Nagpur North Assembly); Tekchand Sawarkar (58 Kamthi Assembly); Ashish Jaiswal (59 Ramtek Assembly)
- Area (km2): 9,892
- Population (2011 Census): 4,653,570
- % of State Population: 4.14%
- Municipal Corporation: Nagpur Municipal Corporation

== Nandurbar District ==
Nandurbar District नंदुरबार जिल्हा
- Website: nandurbar.gov.in/en/
- District: Nandurbar
- Administrative Division: Nashik Division (better known as North Maharashtra or Khandesh)
- Headquarters: Dhule City
- Formed: 01 July 1998
- Tehsils: Total = 06: Shahada; Nandurbar; Navapur; Taloda; Akkalkuwa; Dhadgaon
- Government Body: Nandurbar Zilla Parishad
- Currently Guardian Minister: Anil Bhaidas Patil (Cabinet Minister)
- Currently Guardian Secretary: Dr. Mittali Sethi (IAS) (Collector and District Magistrate Nandurbar)
- Lok Sabha MPs: Gowaal Padavi (01 Nandurbar Lok Sabha)
- Assembly MLAs: Kagda Chandya Padvi (01 Akkalkuwa Assembly); Rajesh Padvi (02 Dhule Rural Assembly); Vijaykumar Krishnarao Gavit (03 Nandurbar Assembly); Shirishkumar Surupsing Naik (04 Navapur Assembly)
- Area (km2): 5,955
- Population (2011 Census): 1,648,295
- % of State Population: 1.47%

== Nashik District ==
Nashik District नाशिक जिल्हा
- Website: nashik.gov.in/en/
- District: Nashik
- Administrative Division: Nashik Division (better known as North Maharashtra or Khandesh)
- Headquarters: Nashik City
- Formed: 01 May 1960
- Tehsils: Total = 15: Nashik; Sinnar; Igatpuri; Trimbak; Niphad; Yeola; Peth; Dindori; Chandwad; Baglan; Deola; Kalwan; Malegaon; Nandgaon; Surgana
- Government Body: Nashik Zilla Parishad
- Currently Guardian Secretary: Ayush Prasad (IAS) (Collector and District Magistrate Nashik)
- Lok Sabha MPs: Rajabhau Waje (21 Nashik Lok Sabha); Bhaskar Bhagare (20 Dindori Lok Sabha)
- Assembly MLAs: Suhas Kande (113 Nandgaon Assembly); Mohammed Ismail Abdul Khalique (114 Malegaon Central Assembly); Dadaji Bhuse (115 Malegaon Outer Assembly); Dilip Manglu Borse (116 Baglan Assembly); Nitin Arjun Pawar (117 Kalwan Assembly); Rahul Daulatrao Aher (118 Chandwad Assembly); Chaggan Bhujbal (119 Yevla Assembly); Manikrao Shivajirao Kokate (120 Sinnar Assembly); Diliprao Shankarrao Bankar (121 Niphad Assembly); Narhari Sitaram Zirwal (122 Dindori Assembly); Rahul Uattamrao Dhikle (123 Nashik East Assembly); Devyani Suhas Pharande (124 Nashik Central Assembly); Seema Mahesh Hiray (125 Nashik West Assembly); Saroj Babulal Ahire (126 Deolali Assembly); Hiraman Bhika Khoskar (127 Igatpuri Assembly)
- Area (km2): 15,582
- Population (2011 Census): 6,107,187
- % of State Population: 5.43%
- Municipal Corporation: Nashik Municipal Corporation

=== List ===
Guardian Minister Update = 24 September 2022

No.	Portrait	Guardian_Minister	Constituency	Term of office			Political party	Home District	Portfolio	Ministry	Chief Minister
No.	Portrait	Guardian_Minister	Constituency	From	To	Period	Political party	Home District	Portfolio	Ministry	Chief Minister
Guardian Minister of Nashik
01		Chhagan Bhujbal (Deputy Chief Minister)	(MLC for Elected by MLAs Constituency No. 09 - Mumbai City District) (Legislative Council)	19 October 1999	16 January 2003	3 years, 89 days	Nationalist Congress Party	Mumbai City District	Minister of Home Affairs; Minister of Social Justice; Minister of Special Assistance; Minister of Majority Welfare Development	Deshmukh I	Vilasrao Deshmukh
02		Chhagan Bhujbal (Deputy Chief Minister)	(MLC for Elected by MLAs Constituency No. 09 - Mumbai City District) (Legislative Council)	18 January 2003	01 November 2004	1 year, 295 days	Nationalist Congress Party	Mumbai City District	Minister of Public Works (Excluding Public Undertakings); Minister of Social Justice; Minister of Ports Development	Sushilkumar	Sushilkumar Shinde
03		Chhagan Bhujbal (Cabinet Minister)	(MLA for Yevla Constituency No. 119- Nashik District) (Legislative Assembly)	01 November 2004	01 December 2008	4 years, 30 days	Nationalist Congress Party	Nashik District	Minister of Public Works (Excluding Public Undertakings)	Deshmukh II	Vilasrao Deshmukh
04		Chhagan Bhujbal (Cabinet Minister)	(MLA for Yevla Constituency No. 119- Nashik District) (Legislative Assembly)	08 December 2008	06 November 2009	333 days	Nationalist Congress Party	Nashik Nagpur	Minister of Public Works (Excluding Public Undertakings); Minister of Tourism; Minister of Other Backward Classes	Ashok I	Ashok Chavan
05		Chhagan Bhujbal (Deputy Chief Minister)	(MLA for Yevla Constituency No. 119- Nashik District) (Legislative Assembly)	07 November 2009	10 November 2010	1 year, 3 days	Nationalist Congress Party	Nashik District	Minister of Public Works (excluding Public Undertakings); Minister of Special Assistance	Ashok II	Ashok Chavan
06		Chhagan Bhujbal (Cabinet Minister)	(MLA for Yevla Constituency No. 119- Nashik District) (Legislative Assembly)	11 November 2010	26 September 2014	3 years, 319 days	Nationalist Congress Party	Nashik District	Minister of Public Works (excluding Public Undertakings); Minister of Tourism	Prithviraj	Prithviraj Chavan
07		Girish Mahajan (Cabinet Minister)	(MLA for Jamner Constituency No. 19- Jalgaon District) (Legislative Assembly)	05 December 2014	12November 2019	4 Years, And 7 Days	Bharatiya Janata Party	Jalgaon District	Minister of Parliamentary Affairs; Minister of Food, Civil Supplies; Minister of Consumer Protection; Minister of Food & Drug Administration	Fadnavis I	Devendra Fadnavis
									Minister of Medical Education; Minister of Water Resources; Minister of Command Area Development	Fadnavis I	Devendra Fadnavis
09		Chhagan Bhujbal (Cabinet Minister)	(MLA for Yevla Constituency No. 119- Nashik District) (Legislative Assembly)	09 January 2020	29 June 2022	2 years, 171 days	Nationalist Congress Party	Nashik District	Minister of Food, Civil Supplies; Minister of Consumer Protection	Thackeray	Uddhav Thackeray
10		Dadaji Bhuse (Cabinet Minister)	(MLA for Malegaon Outer Constituency No. 81- Nashik District) (Legislative Assembly)	24 September 2022	5 December 2024	2 years, 72 days	Shiv Sena (Shinde Group)	Nashik District	Minister of Public Works (Including Public Undertakings); Minister of Employment Guarantee; Minister of Horticulture	Eknath	Eknath Shinde
11		Girish Mahajan (Cabinet Minister)	(MLA for Jamner Assembly constituency- Jalgaon District) (Legislative Assembly)	17 August 2026	Incumbent		Bharatiya Janata Party	Jalgaon district	Minister of Water management	Fadnavis	Devendra Fadnavis

== Palghar District ==
Palghar District पालघर जिल्हा
- Website: palghar.gov.in/en/
- District: Palghar
- Administrative Division: Konkan Division
- Headquarters: Palghar City
- Formed: 1 August 2014
- Tehsils: Total = 08: Vasai; Palghar; Dahanu; Talasari; Vada; Jawhar; Mokhada; Vikramgad
- Government Body: Palghar Zilla Parishad
- Currently Guardian Minister: Ravindra Chavan (Cabinet Minister)
- Currently Guardian Secretary: Govind Maruti Bodke (IAS) (Collector and District Magistrate)
- Lok Sabha MPs: Hemant Savara (22 Palghar Lok Sabha)
- Assembly MLAs: Vinod Bhiva Nikole (128 Dahanu Assembly); Sunil Bhuasara (129 Vikramgad Assembly); Shrinivas Vanga (130 Palghar Assembly); Rajesh Raghunath Patil (131 Boisar Assembly); Kshitij Thakur (132 Nalasopara Assembly); Hitendra Thakur (133 Vasai Assembly)
- Area (km2): 5,344
- Population (2011 Census): 2,990,116
- % of state Population: 2.66%
- Municipal Corporation: Vasai-Virar City Municipal Corporation

== Parbhani District ==
Parbhani District परभणी जिल्हा
- Website: parbhani.gov.in/en/
- District: Parbhani
- Administrative Division: Chhatrapati Sambhajinagar Division (better known as Marathwada or Aurangabad division)
- Headquarters: Parbhani City
- Formed: 1 May 1960
- Tehsils: Total = 09: Parbhani; Gangakhed; Sonpeth; Pathri; Manwath; Palam; Sailu; Jintur; Purna
- Government Body: Parbhani Zilla Parishad
- Currently Guardian Minister: Sanjay Bansode (Cabinet Minister)
- Currently Guardian Secretary: Raghunath Gawade (IAS) (Collector and District Magistrate Parbhani)
- Lok Sabha MPs: Sanjay Jadhav (17 Parbhani Lok Sabha)
- Assembly MLAs: Meghana Bordikar (95 Jintur Assembly); Rahul Vedprakash Patil (96 Parbhani Assembly); Ratnakar Gutte (97 Gangakhed Assembly); Suresh Warpudkar (98 Pathri Assembly)
- Area (km2): 6,251
- Population (2011 Census): 1,836,086
- % of State Population: 1.63%
- Municipal Corporation: Parbhani Municipal Corporation

== Pune District ==
- Ajit Pawar
  (Cabinet Minister)
  18 October 1999 - 16 January 2003

- Ajit Pawar
  (Cabinet Minister)
  18 January 2003 - 01 November 2004

- Ajit Pawar
  (Cabinet Minister)
  01 November 2004 - 04 December 2008

- Ajit Pawar
  (Cabinet Minister)
  08 December 2008 - 06 November 2009

- Ajit Pawar
  (Cabinet Minister)
  07 November 2009 - 10 November 2010

- Ajit Pawar
  (Deputy Chief Minister)
  11 November 2010 - 26 September 2014

- Girish Bapat
  (Cabinet Minister)
  31 October 2014 - 23 May 2019

- Chandrakant Patil Additional Charge
  (Cabinet Minister)
  23 May 2019 - 04 November 2019

- Ajit Pawar
  (Deputy Chief Minister)
  09 January 2020 - 29 June 2022

- Chandrakant Patil
  (Cabinet Minister)
  27 September 2022 - 04 October 2023

- Ajit Pawar
  (Deputy Chief Minister)
  04 October 2023 - 26 November 2024

- Ajit Pawar
  (Deputy Chief Minister)
  18 January 2025 - 28 January 2026

- Devendra Fadnavis Additional Charge
  (Chief Minister)

28 January 2026 - 03 February 2026

- Sunetra Ajit Pawar
  (Deputy Chief Minister)
  03 February 2026 - Incumbent

== Raigad District ==
Raigad District रायगड जिल्हा
- Website: raigad.gov.in/en/
- District: Raigad
- Previously Known: Colaba District
- Administrative Division: Konkan Division
- Headquarters: Alibag City
- Formed: 1 May 1960
- Tehsils: Total = 15: Alibag; Panvel; Murud; Pen; Uran; Karjat; Khalapur; Mangaon; Roha; Sudhagad Pali; Tala; Mahad; Mhasala; Shrivardhan; Poladpur
- Government Body: Raigad Zilla Parishad Alibag
- Currently Guardian Minister: Bharatshet Gogawale (Cabinet Minister)
- Currently Guardian Secretary: Kishan Narayanrao Jawale (IAS) (Collector and District Magistrate Raigad)
- Lok Sabha MPs: Sunil Tatkare (Raigad); Shrirang Barne (Maval)
- Assembly MLAs: Prashant Thakur (188 Panvel Assembly); Mahendra Thorve (189 Karjat Assembly); Mahesh Baldi (190 Uran Assembly); Ravisheth Patil (191 Pen Assembly); Mahendra Dalvi (192 Alibag Assembly); Aditi Sunil Tatkare (193 Shrivardhan Assembly); Bharatshet Gogawale (194 Mahad Assembly)
- Area (km2): 7,152
- Population (2011 Census): 2,634,200
- % of state Population: 2.34%
- Municipal Corporation: Panvel Municipal Corporation; Navi Mumbai Municipal Corporation

=== List ===
Guardian Minister Update = 24 September 2022

No.	Portrait	Guardian_Minister	Constituency	Term of office			Political party	Home District	Portfolio	Ministry	Chief Minister
No.	Portrait	Guardian_Minister	Constituency	From	To	Period	Political party	Home District	Portfolio	Ministry	Chief Minister
Guardian Minister of Raigad
01		Rohidas Patil (Cabinet Minister)	(MLA for Dhule Constituency No. 07- Dhule District (Legislative Assembly)	19 October 1999	16 January 2003	3 years, 89 days	Indian National Congress	Dhule District	Minister of Housing; Minister of House Repairs and Reconstruction; Minister of Parliamentary Affairs	Deshmukh I	Vilasrao Deshmukh
02		Husain Dalwai (Cabinet Minister)	(MLA for Ratnagiri Khed Constituency No. 266- Ratnagiri District) (Legislative Assembly)	18 January 2003	01 November 2004	1 year, 295 days	Indian National Congress	Ratnagiri District	Minister of Minority Development and Aukaf; Minister of State Border Defence (Second)	Sushilkumar	Sushilkumar Shinde
03		Sunil Tatkare (Cabinet Minister)	(MLA for Mangaon Constituency No. 194- Raigad District) (Legislative Assembly)	01 November 2004	01 December 2008	4 years, 30 days	Nationalist Congress Party	Raigad District	Minister of Food and Civil Supplies; Minister of Khar Land Development	Deshmukh II	Vilasrao Deshmukh
04		Sunil Tatkare (Cabinet Minister)	(MLA for Mangaon Constituency No. 194- Raigad District) (Legislative Assembly)	08 December 2008	06 November 2009	333 days	Nationalist Congress Party	Raigad District	Minister of Energy	Ashok I	Ashok Chavan
05		Sunil Tatkare (Cabinet Minister)	(MLA for Shrivardhan Constituency No. 193- Raigad District) (Legislative Assembly)	07 November 2009	10 November 2010	1 year, 3 days	Nationalist Congress Party	Raigad District	Minister of Finance; Minister of Planning	Ashok II	Ashok Chavan
06		Sunil Tatkare (Cabinet Minister)	(MLA for Shrivardhan Constituency No. 193- Raigad District) (Legislative Assembly)	11 November 2010	26 September 2014	3 years, 319 days	Nationalist Congress Party	Raigad District	Minister of Water Resources.; Minister of Command Area Development.; Minister of Earthquake Rehabilitation; Minister of State Border Defence (Second)	Prithviraj	Prithviraj Chavan
07		Prakash Mehta (Cabinet Minister)	(MLA for Ghatkopar East Constituency No. 170- Mumbai Suburban District (Legislative Assembly)	31 October 2014	16 June 2019	4 years, 228 days	Bharatiya Janata Party	Mumbai Suburban District	Minister of Housing; Minister of Labour; Minister of Mining Department; Minister of Parliamentary Affairs	Fadnavis I	Devendra Fadnavis
08		Ravindra Chavan (Minister of State)	(MLA for Dombivli Constituency No. 143- Thane District) (Legislative Assembly)	16 June 2019	12 November 2019	149 days	Bharatiya Janata Party	Thane District	Deputy Minister of Ports; Deputy Minister of Medical Education; Deputy Minister of Information and Technology; Deputy Minister of Food and Civil Supplies; Deputy Minister of Consumer Protectionon	Fadnavis I	Devendra Fadnavis
09		Aditi Sunil Tatkare (Minister of State)	(MLA for Shrivardhan Constituency No. 193- Raigad District) (Legislative Assembly)	09 January 2020	29 June 2022	2 years, 171 days	Nationalist Congress Party	Raigad District	Deputy Minister of Law and Judiciary.; Deputy Minister of Industries.; Deputy Minister of Mining Department.; Deputy Minister of Tourism.; Deputy Minister of Horticulture; Deputy Minister of Sports and Youth Welfare; Deputy Minister of Information and Public Relations.; Deputy Minister of Protocol	Thackeray	Uddhav Thackeray
10		Uday Samant (Cabinet Minister)	(MLA for Ratnagiri Constituency No. 266- Ratnagiri District (Legislative Assembly)	24 September 2022	5 December 2024	2 years, 72 days	Shiv Sena (Shinde Group)	Ratnagiri District	Minister of Industries	Eknath	Eknath Shinde

== Ratnagiri District ==
Ratnagiri District रत्नागिरी जिल्हा
- Website: ratnagiri.gov.in/en/
- District: Ratnagiri
- Administrative Division: Konkan Division
- Headquarters: Ratnagiri City
- Formed: 1 May 1960
- Tehsils: Total = 09: Mandangad; Dapoli; Khed; Guhagar; Chiplun; Ratnagiri; Sangmeshwar; Lanja; Rajapur
- Government Body: Ratnagiri Zilla Parishad
- Currently Guardian Minister: Uday Samant (Cabinet Minister)
- Currently Guardian Secretary: Devender Singh (IAS) (Collector and District Magistrate Ratnagiri)
- Lok Sabha MPs: Narayan Rane (46 Ratnagiri–Sindhudurg Lok Sabha); Sunil Tatkare (32 Raigad Lok Sabha)
- Assembly MLAs: Yogesh Kadam (263 Dapoli Assembly); Bhaskar Jadhav (263 Guhagar Assembly); Shekhar Govindrao Nikam (264 Chiplun Assembly); Uday Samant (265 Ratnagiri Assembly); Rajan Salvi (266 Rajapur Assembly)
- Area (km2): 8,208
- Population (2011 Census): 1,615,069
- % of state Population: 1.44%
- Municipal Corporation: --

=== List ===
Guardian Minister Update = 24 September 2022

No.	Portrait	Guardian_Minister	Constituency	Term of office			Political party	Home District	Portfolio	Ministry	Chief Minister
No.	Portrait	Guardian_Minister	Constituency	From	To	Period	Political party	Home District	Portfolio	Ministry	Chief Minister
Guardian Minister of Ratnagiri
01		Ganpatrao Deshmukh (Cabinet Minister)	(MLA for Sangola Constituency No. 235- Solapur District (Legislative Assembly)	19 October 1999	16 January 2003	3 years, 89 days	Peasants and Workers Party of India	Solapur District	Minister of Marketing; Minister of Employment Guarantee; Minister of Tourism; Minister of Woman and Child Development	Deshmukh I	Vilasrao Deshmukh
02		Vasant Chavan (Cabinet Minister)	(MLC for Governor Nominated Constituency No. 11 - Pune District) (Legislative Council)	18 January 2003	01 November 2004	1 year, 295 days	Nationalist Congress Party	Pune District	Minister of Food and Drug Administration; Minister of Mining	Sushilkumar	Sushilkumar Shinde
03		Anees Ahmed (Cabinet Minister)	(MLA for Nagpur Central Constituency No. 55- Nagpur District (Legislative Assembly)	01 November 2004	01 December 2008	4 years, 30 days	Indian National Congress	Nagpur District	Minister of Minority Development and Waqfs; Minister of Animal Husbandry; Minister of Dairy Development	Deshmukh II	Vilasrao Deshmukh
04		Ganesh Naik (Cabinet Minister)	(MLA for Belapur Constituency No. 151- Thane District) (Legislative Assembly)	08 December 2008	06 November 2009	333 days	Nationalist Congress Party	Thane District	Minister of Environment; Minister of State Excise; Minister of Special Backward Classes Welfare	Ashok I	Ashok Chavan
05		Sunil Tatkare (Cabinet Minister)	(MLA for Shrivardhan Constituency No. 193- Raigad District) (Legislative Assembly)	07 November 2009	10 November 2010	1 year, 3 days	Nationalist Congress Party	Raigad District	Minister of Finance; Minister of Planning	Ashok II	Ashok Chavan
06		Sunil Tatkare (Cabinet Minister)	(MLA for Shrivardhan Constituency No. 193- Raigad District) (Legislative Assembly)	11 November 2010	26 September 2014	3 years, 319 days	Nationalist Congress Party	Raigad District	Minister of Water Resources.; Minister of Command Area Development.; Minister of Earthquake Rehabilitation; Minister of State Border Defence (Second)	Prithviraj	Prithviraj Chavan
07		Ravindra Waikar (Minister of State)	(MLA for Jogeshwari East Constituency No. 158- Mumbai Suburban District (Legislative Assembly)	31 October 2014	12 November 2019	5 years, 12 days	Shiv Sena	Mumbai Suburban District	Deputy Minister of Housing; Deputy Minister of Higher and Technical Education	Fadnavis I	Devendra Fadnavis
08		Anil Parab (Cabinet Minister)	(MLC for Elected by MLAs Constituency No. 07 - Ratnagiri District) (Legislative Council)	09 January 2020	29 June 2022	2 years, 171 days	Shiv Sena	Ratnagiri District	Minister of Transport.; Minister of Parliamentary Affairs	Thackeray	Uddhav Thackeray
09		Uday Samant (Cabinet Minister)	(MLA for Ratnagiri Constituency No. 266- Ratnagiri District (Legislative Assembly)	24 September 2022	18 January 2025	4 years, 4 days	Shiv Sena (Shinde Group)	Ratnagiri District	Minister of Industries	Eknath	Eknath Shinde
09		Uday Samant (Cabinet Minister)	(MLA for Ratnagiri Constituency No. 266- Ratnagiri District (Legislative Assembly)	24 September 2022	Incumbent	4 years, 4 days	Shiv Sena (Shinde Group)	Ratnagiri District	Minister of Industries	Fadnavis III	Devendra Fadnavis

== Sangli District ==
Sangli District सांगली जिल्हा
- Website: sangli.gov.in/en/
- District: Sangli
- Administrative Division: Pune Division (better known as Paschim Maharashtra or Desh)
- Headquarters: Sangli City
- Formed: 01 May 1960
- Tehsils: Total = 09: Miraj; Palus; Tasgaon; Kavathe-Mahankal; Jat, Sangli; Khanapur; Atpadi; Walwa; Kadegaon
- Government Body: Sangli Zilla Parishad
- Currently Guardian Minister: Suresh Khade (Cabinet Minister)
- Currently Guardian Secretary: Dr. Raja Dayanidhi (IAS) (Collector and District Magistrate)
- Lok Sabha MPs: Vishal Patil (44 Sangli Lok Sabha); Dhairyasheel Sambhajirao Mane (48 Hatkanangle Lok Sabha)
- Assembly MLAs: Suresh Khade (281 Miraj Assembly); Sudhir Gadgil (282 Sangli Assembly); Jayant Patil (283 Islampur Assembly); Mansing Fattesingrao Naik (284 Shirala Assembly); Vishwajeet Kadam (285 Palus-Kadegaon Assembly); Vacant (286 Khanapur Assembly); Suman Patil (287 Tasgaon-Kavathe Mahankal Assembly); Vikramsinh Balasaheb Sawant (288 Jat Assembly)
- Area (km2): 8,578
- Population (2011 Census): 2,822,143
- % of State Population: 2.51%
- Municipal Corporation: Sangli, Miraj and Kupwad City Municipal Corporation

== Satara District ==
Satara District सातारा जिल्हा
- Website: satara.gov.in/en/
- District: Satara
- Administrative Division: Pune Division (better known as Paschim Maharashtra or Desh)
- Headquarters: Satara City
- Formed: 01 May 1960
- Tehsils: Total = 11: Satara; Karad; Wai; Mahabaleshwar; Phaltan; Maan; Khatav; Koregaon; Patan; Jaoli; Khandala
- Government Body: Satara Zilla Parishad
- Currently Guardian Minister: Shambhuraj Desai (Cabinet Minister)
- Currently Guardian Secretary: Jitendra Dudi (IAS) (Collector and District Magistrate)
- Lok Sabha MPs: Dhairyasheel Patil (43 Madha Lok Sabha); Udayanraje Bhosale (45 Satara Lok Sabha)
- Assembly MLAs: Dipak Pralhad Chavan (255 Phaltan Assembly); Makrand Jadhav - Patil (256 Wai Assembly); Mahesh Shinde (257 Koregaon Assembly); Jaykumar Gore (258 Man Assembly); Shamrao Pandurang Patil (259 Karad North Assembly); Prithviraj Chavan (260 Karad South Assembly); Shambhuraj Desai (261 Patan Assembly); Shivendra Raje Bhosale (262 Satara Assembly)
- Area (km2): 10,480
- Population (2011 Census): 3,003,741
- % of State Population: 2.67%

== Sindhudurg District ==
Sindhudurg District सिंधुदुर्ग जिल्हा
- Website: sindhudurg.gov.in/en/
- District: Sindhudurg
- Administrative Division: Konkan Division
- Headquarters: Oros, Sindhudurg City
- Formed: 1 May 1960
- Tehsils: Total = 08: Dodamarg; Sawantwadi; Vengurla; Kudal; Malvan; Kankavli; Devgad; Vaibhavwadi
- Government Body: Sindhudurg Zilla Parishad
- Currently Guardian Minister: Ravindra Chavan (Cabinet Minister)
- Currently Guardian Secretary: Kishor Tawade (IAS) (Collector and District Magistrate Sindhudurg)
- Lok Sabha MPs: Narayan Rane (46 Ratnagiri–Sindhudurg Lok Sabha)
- Assembly MLAs: Nitesh Narayan Rane (268 Kankavli Assembly); Vaibhav Naik (269 Kudal Assembly); Deepak Vasant Kesarkar (270 Sawantwadi Assembly)
- Area (km2): 5,207
- Population (2011 Census): 849,651
- % of state Population: 0.76%
- Municipal Corporation: --

=== List ===
Guardian Minister Update = 24 September 2022

No.	Portrait	Guardian_Minister	Constituency	Term of office			Political party	Home District	Portfolio	Ministry	Chief Minister
No.	Portrait	Guardian_Minister	Constituency	From	To	Period	Political party	Home District	Portfolio	Ministry	Chief Minister
Guardian Minister of Sindhudurg
01		Eknath Gaikwad (Minister of State)	(MLA for Dharavi Constituency No. 178- Mumbai City District) (Legislative Assembly)	19 October 1999	16 January 2003	3 years, 89 days	Indian National Congress	Mumbai City District	Deputy Minister of Public Health and Family Welfare; Deputy Minister of Medical Education	Deshmukh I	Vilasrao Deshmukh
02		Anand Devkate (Cabinet Minister)	(MLA for Solapur South Constituency No. 251- Solapur District (Legislative Assembly)	18 January 2003	01 November 2004	1 year, 295 days	Indian National Congress	Solapur District	Minister of Animal Husbandry Department; Minister of Dairy Development; Minister of House Repairs and Reconstruction	Sushilkumar	Sushilkumar Shinde
03		Vinay Kore (Cabinet Minister)	(MLA for Shahuwadi Constituency No. 277- Kolhapur District) (Legislative Assembly)	01 November 2004	01 December 2008	4 years, 30 days	Jan Surajya Shakti	Kolhapur District	Minister of Non-conventional Energy; Minister of Horticulture	Deshmukh II	Vilasrao Deshmukh
04		Harshvardhan Patil (Cabinet Minister)	(MLA for Indapur Constituency No. 200- Pune District (Legislative Assembly)	08 December 2008	06 November 2009	333 days	Independent Supported Party Indian National Congress	Pune Nagpur	Minister of Cooperation; Minister of Cultural Affairs	Ashok I	Ashok Chavan
05		Narayan Rane (Cabinet Minister)	(MLC for Elected by MLAs Constituency No. 03 - Sindhudurg District) (Legislative Council)	07 November 2009	10 November 2010	1 year, 3 days	Indian National Congress	Sindhudurg District	Minister of Revenue; Minister of Earthquake Rehabilitation; Minister of Khar land Development; Minister of Relief and Rehabilitation	Ashok II	Ashok Chavan
06		Narayan Rane (Cabinet Minister)	(MLC for Elected by MLAs Constituency No. 03 - Sindhudurg District) (Legislative Council)	11 November 2010	26 September 2014	3 years, 319 days	Indian National Congress	Sindhudurg District	Minister of Industries; Minister of Mining Department; Minister of Ports Development; Minister of Employment and Self-employment	Prithviraj	Prithviraj Chavan
07		Deepak Vasant Kesarkar (Minister of State)	(MLA for Sawantwadi Constituency No. 270- Sindhudurg District) (Legislative Assembly)	05 December 2014	12 November 2019	4 years, 342 days	Shiv Sena	Sindhudurg District	Deputy Minister of Home Affairs (Rural); Deputy Minister of Finance; Deputy Minister of Planning	Fadnavis I	Devendra Fadnavis
08		Uday Samant (Cabinet Minister)	(MLA for Ratnagiri Constituency No. 266- Ratnagiri District (Legislative Assembly)	09 January 2020	27 June 2022	2 years, 169 days	Shiv Sena	Ratnagiri District	Minister of Higher and Technical Education	Thackeray	Uddhav Thackeray
09		Anil Parab (Cabinet Minister); Additional Charge	(MLC for Elected by MLAs Constituency No. 07 - Ratnagiri District) (Legislative Council)	27 June 2022	29 June 2022	2 days	Shiv Sena	Ratnagiri District	Minister of Transport; Minister of Parliamentary Affairs; Minister of Water Supply; Minister of Sanitation	Thackeray	Uddhav Thackeray
10		Ravindra Chavan (Cabinet Minister)	(MLA for Dombivli Constituency No. 143- Thane District) (Legislative Assembly)	24 Sepbember; 2022	5 December 2025	2 years, 72 days	Bharatiya Janata Party	Thane District	Minister of Public Works (excluding Public Undertakings)	Eknath	Eknath Shinde
	Nitesh Rane (Cabinet Minister)	(MLA for Dombivli Constituency No. 143- Thane District) (Legislative Assembly)	24 Sepbember; 2022	5 December 2025	2 years, 72 days	Bharatiya Janata Party	Thane District	Minister of Public Works (excluding Public Undertakings)	Fadnavis 3		

== Solapur District ==
Solapur District सोलापूर जिल्हा
- Website: solapur.gov.in/en/
- District: Solapur
- Administrative Division: Pune Division (better known as Paschim Maharashtra or Desh)
- Headquarters: Solapur City'
- Formed: 1 May 1960
- Tehsils: Total = 11: North Solapur; South Solapur; Akkalkot; Barshi; Mangalwedha; Pandharpur; Sangola; Malshiras; Mohol; Madha; Karmala
- Government Body: Solapur Zilla Parishad
- Currently Guardian Minister: Chandrakant Patil (Cabinet Minister)
- Currently Guardian Secretary: Kumar Ashirwad (IAS) (Collector and District Magistrate)
- Lok Sabha MPs: Omprakash Rajenimbalkar (40 Osmanabad Lok Sabha); Praniti Sushilkumar Shinde (42 Solapur Lok Sabha); Dhairyasheel Patil (43 Madha Lok Sabha)
- Assembly MLAs: narayn patil (244 Karmala Assembly); abhijeet patil (245 Madha Assembly); dilip sopal (246 Wadala Assembly); Yashwant Mane (247 Mohol Assembly); Vijay Deshmukh (248 Solapur City North Assembly); Vacant (249 Solapur City Central Assembly); Sachin Kalyanshetti (250 Akkalkot Assembly); Subhash Sureshchandra Deshmukh (251 Solapur South Assembly); Samadhan Autade (252 Pandharpur Assembly); Deshmukh (253 Sangola Assembly); uttam jankar (254 Malshiras Assembly)
- Area (km2): 14,895
- Population (2011 Census): 4,317,756
- % of State Population: 3.84%
- Municipal Corporation: Solapur Municipal Corporation

== Thane District ==
Thane District ठाणे जिल्हा
- Website: thane.gov.in/en/
- District: Thane
- Administrative Division: Konkan Division
- Headquarters: Thane City
- Formed: 1 May 1960
- Tehsils: Total = 07: Thane; Kalyan; Murbad; Bhiwandi; Shahapur; Ulhasnagar; Ambarnath
- Government Body: Thane Zilla Parishad
- Currently Guardian Minister: Shambhuraj Desai (Cabinet Minister)
- Currently Guardian Secretary: Ashok Shingare (IAS) (Collector and District Magistrate)
- Lok Sabha MPs: Suresh Mhatre (23 Bhiwandi Lok Sabha); Shrikant Shinde' (24 Kalyan Lok Sabha); Naresh Mhaske (25 Thane Lok Sabha)
- Assembly MLAs: Shantaram Tukaram More (134 Bhiwandi Rural Assembly); Daulat Daroda (135 Shahapur Assembly); Mahesh Prabhakar Choughule (136 Bhiwandi West Assembly); Rais Shaikh (137 Bhiwandi East Assembly); Vishwanath Bhoir (138 Kalyan West Assembly); Kisan Kathore (139 Murbad Assembly); Balaji Kinikar (140 Ambernath Assembly); Kumar Ailani (141 Ulhasnagar Assembly); Ganpat Gaikwad (142 Kalyan East Assembly); Ravindra Chavan (143 Dombivli Assembly); Pramod Ratan Patil (144 Kalyan Rural Assembly); Geeta Bharat Jain (145 Mira Bhayandar Assembly); Pratap Sarnaik (146 Ovala-Majiwada Assembly); Eknath Shinde (147 Kopri-Pachpakhadi Assembly); Sanjay Mukund Kelkar (148 Thane Assembly); Jitendra Awhad (149 Mumbra-Kalwa Assembly); Ganesh Naik (150 Airoli Assembly); Manda Vijay Mhatre (151 Belapur Assembly)
- Area (km2): 5,344
- Population (2011 Census): 2,990,116
- % of state Population: 2.66%
- Municipal Corporation: Thane Municipal Corporation; Mira-Bhayandar Municipal Corporation; Navi Mumbai Municipal Corporation; Kalyan-Dombivali Municipal Corporation; Ulhasnagar Municipal Corporation; Bhiwandi-Nizampur Municipal Corporation

=== List ===
Guardian Minister Update = 24 September 2022

No.	Portrait	Guardian_Minister	Constituency	Term of office			Political party	Home District	Portfolio	Ministry	Chief Minister
No.	Portrait	Guardian_Minister	Constituency	From	To	Period	Political party	Home District	Portfolio	Ministry	Chief Minister
Guardian Minister of Thane
01		Husain Dalwai (Cabinet Minister)	(MLA for Ratnagiri Khed Constituency No. 266- Ratnagiri District) (Legislative Assembly)	19 October 1999	16 January 2003	3 years, 89 days	Indian National Congress	Ratnagiri District	Minister of Labour; Minister of Minority Development and Aukaf; Minister of Ports	Deshmukh I	Vilasrao Deshmukh
02		Patangrao Kadam (Cabinet Minister)	(MLA for Palus-Kadegaon Constituency No. 285- Sangli District) (Legislative Assembly)	18 January 2003	01 November 2004	1 year, 295 days	Indian National Congress	Sangli District	Minister of Energy; Minister of New and Renewable Energy	Sushilkumar	Sushilkumar Shinde
03		Ganesh Naik (Cabinet Minister)	(MLA for Belapur Constituency No. 151- Thane District) (Legislative Assembly)	01 November 2004	01 December 2008	4 years, 30 days	Nationalist Congress Party	Thane District	Minister of State Excise; Minister of Environment; Minister of Vimukta Jati	Deshmukh II	Vilasrao Deshmukh
04		Ganesh Naik (Cabinet Minister)	(MLA for Belapur Constituency No. 151- Thane District) (Legislative Assembly)	08 December 2008	06 November 2009	333 days	Nationalist Congress Party	Thane District	Minister of Environment; Minister of State Excise; Minister of Special Backward Classes Welfare	Ashok I	Ashok Chavan
05		Ganesh Naik (Cabinet Minister)	(MLA for Belapur Constituency No. 151- Thane District) (Legislative Assembly)	07 November 2009	10 November 2010	1 year, 3 days	Nationalist Congress Party	Thane District	Minister of State Excise	Ashok II	Ashok Chavan
06		Varsha Gaikwad (Cabinet Minister)	(MLA for Dharavi Constituency No. 178- Mumbai City District) (Legislative Assembly)	11 November 2010	26 September 2014	3 years, 319 days	Indian National Congress	Mumbai City District	Minister of Woman and Child Development	Prithviraj	Prithviraj Chavan
07		Eknath Shinde (Cabinet Minister)	(MLA for Kopri-Pachpakhadi Constituency No. 147- Thane District) (Legislative Assembly)	31 October 2014	12 November 2019	5 years, 12 days	Shiv Sena	Thane District	Minister of Public Works (Including Public Undertakings); Minister of Public Health and Family Welfare	Fadnavis I	Devendra Fadnavis
08		Eknath Shinde (Cabinet Minister)	(MLA for Kopri-Pachpakhadi Constituency No. 147- Thane District) (Legislative Assembly)	09 January 2020	27 June 2022	2 years, 169 days	Shiv Sena	Thane District	Minister of Urban Development; Minister of Public Works (Including Public Undertakings); Minister for State Border Defence (Second)	Thackeray	Uddhav Thackeray
09		Subhash Desai (Cabinet Minister); Additional Charge	(MLC for Elected by MLAs Constituency No. 09 - Mumbai Suburban District) (Legislative Council)	27 June 2022	29 June 2022	2 days	Shiv Sena	Mumbai Suburban District	Minister of Industries; Minister of Mining Department; Minister of Marathi Language; Minister of Urban Development; Minister of Public Works (Including Public Undertakings); Minister for State Border Defence (Second)	Thackeray	Uddhav Thackeray
10		Eknath Shinde (Cabinet Minister)	(MLA for Patan Constituency No. 261- Satara District) (Legislative Assembly)	24 September 2022	5 December 2024	2 years, 72 days	Shiv Sena (Shinde Group)	Thane District	Minister of State Excise; Minister for State Border Defence (Second)	Fadnavis 3	

== Wardha District ==
Wardha District वर्धा जिल्हा
- Website: wardha.gov.in/en/
- District: Wardha
- Administrative Division: Nagpur Division (better known as Vidarbha)
- Headquarters: Wardha City
- Formed: 1 May 1960
- Tehsils: Total = 08: Wardha; Deoli; Seloo; Arvi; Ashti; Karanja; Hinganghat; Samudrapur
- Government Body: Wardha Zilla Parishad
- Currently Guardian Minister: Sudhir Mungantiwar (Cabinet Minister)
- Currently Guardian Secretary: Rahul Kardile (IAS) (Collector and District Magistrate Wardha)
- Lok Sabha MPs: Amar Sharadrao Kale (08 Wardha Lok Sabha)
- Assembly MLAs: Dadarao Keche (44 Arvi Assembly); Ranjit Prataprao Kamble (45 Deoli Assembly); Samir Trimbakrao Kunawar (46 Hinganghat Assembly); Pankaj Rajesh Bhoyar (47 Wardha Assembly)
- Area (km2): 6,310
- Population (2011 Census): 1,300,774
- % of State Population: 1.16%

== Washim District ==
Washim District वाशिम जिल्हा
- Website: washim.gov.in/en/
- District: Washim
- Administrative Division: Amravati Division (better known as Vidarbha)
- Headquarters: Washim City
- Formed: 01 July 1998
- Tehsils: Total = 06: Malegaon; Mangrulpir; Karanja; Manora; Washim; Risod
- Government Body: Washim Zilla Parishad
- Currently Guardian Minister: Hasan Mushrif (Cabinet Minister)
- Currently Guardian Secretary: Buvaneshwari S. (IAS) (Collector and District Magistrate Washim)
- Lok Sabha MPs: Anup Dhotre (06 Akola Lok Sabha); Sanjay Uttamrao Deshmukh (14 Yavatmal–Washim Lok Sabha)
- Assembly MLAs: Amit Subhashrao Zanak (33 Risod Assembly); Lakhan Sahadeo Malik (34 Washim Assembly); Vacant (35 Karanja Assembly)
- Area (km2): 5,150
- Population (2011 Census): 1,197,160
- % of State Population: 1.07%

== Yavatmal District ==
Yavatmal District यवतमाळ जिल्हा
- Website: yavatmal.gov.in/en/
- District: Yavatmal
- Administrative Division: Amravati Division (better known as Vidarbha)
- Headquarters: Yavatmal City
- Formed: 01 May 1960
- Tehsils: Total = 16: Arni; Umarkhed; Kalamb; Pandharkaoda-Kelapur; Ghatanji; Zari Jamani; Darwha; Digras; Ner; Pusad; Babhulgaon; Mahagaon; Maregaon; Yavatmal; Ralegaon; Wani
- Government Body: Yavatmal Zilla Parishad
- Currently Guardian Minister: Sanjay Rathod (Cabinet Minister and MLA 79 Digras Assembly)
- Currently Guardian Secretary: Dr. Pankaj Aashiya (IAS) (Collector and District Magistrate Yavatmal)
- Lok Sabha MPs: Pratibha Dhanorkar (13 Chandrapur Lok Sabha); Sanjay Uttamrao Deshmukh (14 Yavatmal–Washim Lok Sabha); Nagesh Bapurao Patil Ashtikar (15 Hingoli Lok Sabha)
- Assembly MLAs: Sanjay Derkar (76 Wani Assembly); Ashok Uike (77 Ralegaon Assembly); Balasaheb Mangulkar (78 Yavatmal Assembly); Sanjay Rathod (79 Digras Assembly); Raju Narayan Todsam (80 Arni Assembly); Indranil Naik (81 Pusad Assembly); Kisan Wankhede (82 Umarkhed Assembly)
- Area (km2): 13,582
- Population (2011 Census): 2,772,348
- % of State Population: 2.47%
