= Miam Charitable Trust =

Non-profit organization in India

- Established: 2022
- Founder: Nitu Joshi
- Type: NGO
- Headquarters: Mumbai, India
- Board of directors: Sunjoy Mittal; Nipa Shah
- Website: https://miamcharitabletrust.com/

Miam Charitable Trust is a registered Indian non-profit organisation under section 80G, 12A, and NITI Aayog frameworks. Established in 2022 and based in Mumbai, Maharashtra, India, focused on community development and social welfare, particularly in underserved rural and Adivasi (tribal) communities. Founded by social worker Nitu Joshi, the trust emphasizes education, healthcare, environmental conservation, and sustainable development.

== History ==
The trust was established to address social inequalities and empower marginalized communities in Maharashtra, with a focus on tribal and rural populations in districts such as Gadchiroli and Nashik. The trust partnered with Surjagad Ispat Private limited to execute its educational and environmental programs.

== Mission ==
The trust mission is to build self-reliant communities through integrated solutions in education, livelihoods, environmental stewardship, health, and community leadership.

== Activities ==
=== Sunday is Funday ===
On Jun 2025, the trust initiated a program in Gadchiroli engages tribal children with educational and recreational activities to prevent child substance abuse.

=== Har Ghar Naukri, Jeevan Bhar Roshni ===
On Jul 2025, the trust initiated a drive with a meaning as A Job in Every Home, Light for Life. It was launched in Waddalapeth, a remote tribal village in Aheri taluka of Gadchiroli district, Maharashtra, India.

=== Green Gadchiroli Mission ===
On Jun 2026, the trust initiated with donating 500,000 saplings to support large scale afforestation and environmental restoration in Gadchiroli district.

== Program and initiatives ==
The trust undertakes various programs to support community well-being, including:

- Community Empowerment: The trust supports tribal women, particularly single mothers, by fostering public speaking skills and community participation to address issues like alcoholism in Gadchiroli. It also organizes school trips and distributes food packets to create memorable experiences for tribal children.
- Animal Welfare: Miam Charitable Trust runs programs for animal care, including sterilization efforts and support for stray animals.
- Other Causes: It provides resources to orphanages and old age homes, focusing on nutrition, medical care, and companionship.

== Governance ==
Sunjoy Mittal and Nipa Shah are the board of trustees.
