= Savdav =

Village in Maharashtra

- village
- Location in Maharashtra, India Savdav (India)
- Coordinates: 16.19°N 73.40°E
- Country: India
- State: Maharashtra
- District: Sindhudurg district

Languages
  - Official: Marathi
- Time zone: UTC+5:30 (IST)
- PIN: 416602
- Nearest city: Sawantwadi

Savdav is a village in the Kankavli taluka of Sindhudurg district in Maharashtra State, India.

== Attractions ==
There is a waterfall that is safe for swimming at Savdav, and during the rainy season, it becomes a popular tourist attraction.
