= Rajvarhan Sinha =

Indian Police Service officer (born 1971)

Rajvardhan Sinha (born 15 September 1971) is an Indian Police Service officer. In 2013 he was serving as additional commissioner economic offences wing, Mumbai. In 2015 he was appointed as the Joint Commissioner of Police of Nagpur, Maharashtra.In 2018 he was appointed as the Joint Commissioner of Police Economic Offences Wing Mumbai and is now presently posted as Special Inspector General of Police Maharashtra

== Early life and education ==
Sinha was born in the state of Bihar. He graduated as a police officer and joined the IPS in 1997 at Maharashtra.

== Career ==
Sinha served as a Superintendent of Police in Gadchiroli, Maharashtra. For his work there he received the Mahatama Gandhi Peace Award 2003 for communal harmony.

Sinha served for three years as the Deputy Commissioner of the Special Branch-2.

Sinha was one of the two senior police officers who entered the Taj Mahal Palace Hotel during the 26/11 terrorist attack in Mumbai, 2008. For this he later was awarded, but refused, the gallantry award. In 2014 the award was conferred on him.

The story of this incident, including Sinha's actions, were recorded in a book title The Siege, by Adrian Levy and Cathy Scott-Clark.

Sinha was awarded the presidents medal for distinguished service in 2013. In 2014, he worked as additional commissioner of the IPS Economic Offenses wing.

In 2015, Sinha was named Joint Police Commissioner of Nagpur City.
