= Kudkeli =

Village in Maharashtra

Coordinates: 19.416°N 80.415°E

Kudkelli
- village
- Interactive map of Kudkelli
- Country: India
- State: Maharashtra
- District: Gadchiroli

Population (2011)
  - Total: 504

Languages
  - Official: Marathi
- Time zone: UTC+5:30 (IST)
- Vehicle registration: MH-33

Kudkeli is a village in Bhamragad Taluka, Gadchiroli district, Maharashtra, India.

== Geography ==
Kudkeli is a village located in Dandakaranya. It is surrounded by the Bhandiya river. Everyone in the village has their own farm, and rice is commonly grown.

== Ethnicity ==
The village is known as the village of the Madiya tribes and the Veladi (Atram) are the main clan of this village. The language of native people is Madiya, but in around 18th century Telugu people moved in to the jungle for the purpose of business.
