= Ghot, Gadchiroli =

Ghot
- Village
- Location within Maharashtra Location within India
- Coordinates: 19°49′13″N 79°59′11″E
- Country: India
- State: Maharashtra
- District: Gadchiroli
- Time zone: UTC+5:30 (IST)
- PIN: 442604

Ghot (घोट) is a village in Gadchiroli, Maharashtra, India.
