= Dhanora =

- Village
- Location in Maharashtra, India
- Coordinates: 19°55′N 79°52′E
- Country: India
- State: Maharashtra
- District: Gadchiroli
- Elevation: 230 m (750 ft)

Population (2011)
  - Total: 82,698

Languages
  - Official: Marathi
- Time zone: UTC+5:30 (IST)

Dhanora is a Village and a tehsil in Gadchiroli district in the Indian state of Maharashtra.

== Geography ==
Dhanora is located at 19°55′N 79°52′E. It has an average elevation of 230 metres (757 feet).

It is part of Gadchiroli Sub-division of Gadchiroli district along with Gadchiroli, Mulchera and Chamorshi tehsils.

Year	Male	Female	Total Population	Change	Religion (%)							
Year	Male	Female	Total Population	Change	Hindu	Muslim	Christian	Sikhs	Buddhist	Jain	Other religions and persuasions	Religion not stated
2001	39148	38198	77346	-	62.091	0.986	0.693	0.035	4.016	0.025	32.051	0.103
2011	41529	41169	82698	6.920	72.797	1.619	0.935	0.048	3.427	0.015	20.233	0.926
