= Surjagad =

Village in Maharashtra

Surjagad is a small village near Etapalli. There is a yearly festival known as 'Surjagad Yatra' in the first week of January. It is a major festival for the Madia Tribes in Bhamragad and Etapalli Talukas of the Gadchiroli District. Deity of God is situated in a dense forest on a hilly area. It is only accessible during the festival.

Based on the Census 2011 data, Surjagad village in Maharashtra, India, is designated with the location code or village code 539606. This quaint village falls within the jurisdiction of Etapalli tehsil, nestled in the picturesque Gadchiroli district.

Surjagad village is positioned at a distance of 22 kilometers from the sub-district headquarter, Etapalli (tehsildar office), and it stands even further from the district headquarter, Gadchiroli, at approximately 146 kilometers.

According to statistics from 2009, the gram panchayat overseeing Surjagad village is Pursalgondi.

Spanning a total geographical area of 811.16 hectares, Surjagad is home to a population of 184 residents, comprising 88 males and 96 females. The village exhibits a literacy rate of 47.28%, with 51.14% of males and 43.75% of females being literate. In Surjagad, there are approximately 42 houses that provide shelter to its inhabitants.

For all major economic activities, the nearest town to Surjagad is Gadchiroli, located roughly 146 kilometers away.
