= Korchi =

Coordinates: 20°43′N 80°28′E

- Village
- Interactive map of Korchi
- Country: India
- State: Maharashtra
- District: Gadchiroli

Population (2011)
  - Total: 42,811

Languages
  - Official: Marathi
- Time zone: UTC+5:30 (IST)

Korchi is a Village and a tehsil in Gadchiroli district in the Indian state of Maharashtra. It is about 1012 km from the capital city, Mumbai.

The town is good for its connectivity and facilities compared to rest of the area around.

It is part of Kurkheda Sub-division of Gadchiroli district along with Kurkheda, Korchi tehsils.

== Demographics ==
As per Indian government census of 2011, the population was 42,811.

Year	Male	Female	Total Population	Change	Religion (%)							
Year	Male	Female	Total Population	Change	Hindu	Muslim	Christian	Sikhs	Buddhist	Jain	Other religions and persuasions	Religion not stated
2001	20339	20397	40736	-	90.878	0.876	0.020	0.037	7.401	0.000	0.319	0.469
2011	21087	21724	42811	5.094	86.279	0.948	0.079	0.016	6.587	0.012	4.917	1.161
