= Bhamragad =

- Village/ Tehsil
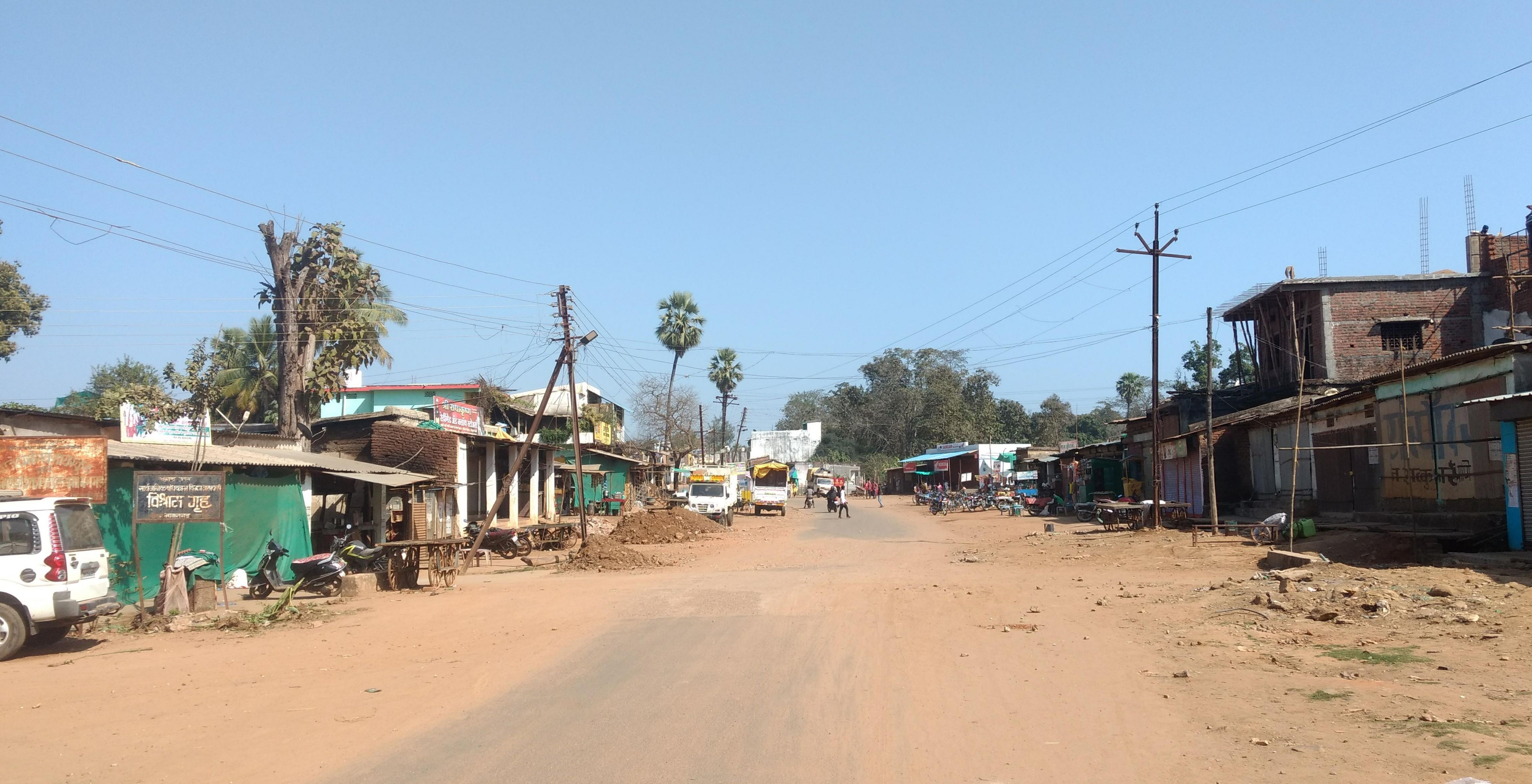
- Main street of Bhamragad

- Location in Maharashtra, India
- Coordinates: 19.41°N 80.58°E
- Country: India
- State: Maharashtra
- District: Gadchiroli

Government
  - Type: Nagar panchayat
  - Body: Bhamragad Nagar panchayat
- Elevation: 231 m (758 ft)

Population (2011)
  - Total: 36,325

Languages
  - Official: Marathi
- Time zone: UTC+5:30 (IST)
- Postal code: 442710
- Telephone code: +91-7134

Bhamragad is a Village and a taluka and a district sub-division in Gadchiroli district in the Indian state of Maharashtra.

It is located on the right banks of a confluence of three rivers: The Indravati River, a tributary of Godavari river, the Pearl Kota, and the Pamul Gautami. It is also located on the border of Maharashtra and Chhattisgarh states of India.

== Geography ==
Bhamragad is located at 19.25°N 80.35°E. It has an average elevation of 231 metres (761 feet).

It is part of etapalli Sub-division of Gadchiroli district along with Etapalli taluka.

It is located in dense forests which are also called Dandkaranya. Most of the population is Madia Gond. These people maintain their traditional lifestyle. Madia Gond children are attending schools. Many now are doctors, paramedics, teachers, police personnel and employees of the government forest department.

== Demographics ==
As per Indian government census of year 2011, the population of tehsil was 36,325.

Year	Male	Female	Total Population	Change	Religion (%)							
Year	Male	Female	Total Population	Change	Hindu	Muslim	Christian	Sikhs	Buddhist	Jain	Other religions and persuasions	Religion not stated
2001	16228	15451	31679	-	86.108	0.754	0.616	0.028	2.623	0.019	9.792	0.060
2011	18319	18006	36325	14.666	94.753	0.930	0.462	0.036	1.374	0.022	1.332	1.090

== Hemalkasa ==
The Lok Biradari Prakalp is located near Hemalkasa, a village in Bhamragad Taluka. This project was founded by Padma Vibhushan Baba Amte, his son Padma Shri Dr. Prakash Amte is the present medical director.

The population of this village is mainly Madia Gond.

== Transport ==
Bhamragad is connected by buses run by MSRTC to Aheri, Gadchiroli. One can get a bus from Nagpur to Aheri or Allapalli as the two are the main transportation hubs (located 7 km from each other) for Bhamragad. Bhamragad is 65 km from Allapalli.

Allapalli is the central town connecting Aheri, Sironcha, Ettapalli, Mulchera, Bhamragad (all five taluka). The towns on the Allapalli to Bhamragad route is Talewada, Permilli, Bhandia (River) Kudkelli Phata, Tadgaon, Hemlkasa and then Bhamragad.
