= Aheri, Gadchiroli =

Aheri
- Town
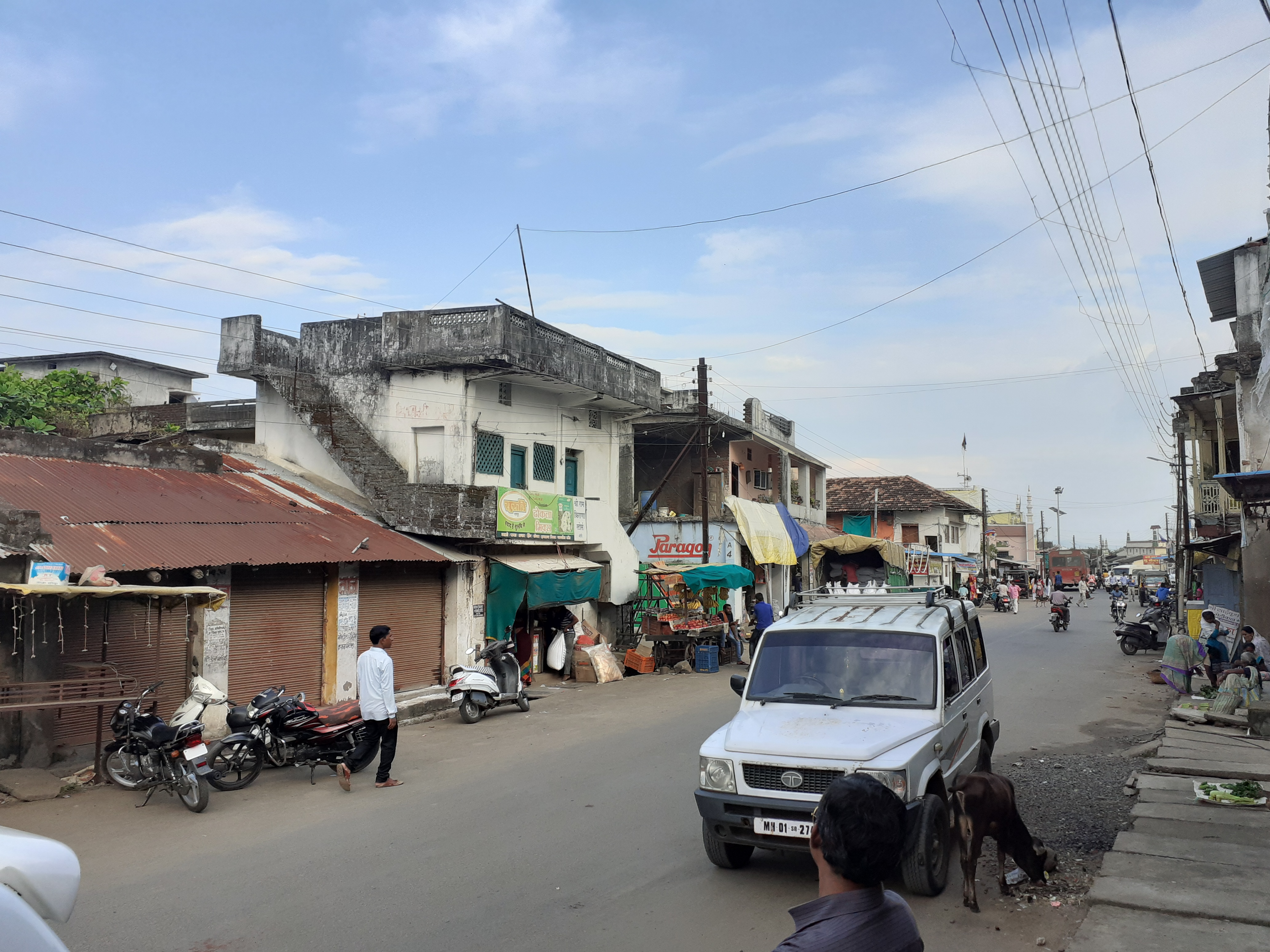
- Main street in Aheri

- Location in Maharashtra, India
- Coordinates: 19.4117°N 80.0039°E
- Country: India
- State: Maharashtra
- District: Gadchiroli
- Elevation: 120 m (390 ft)

Population (2011)
  - Total: 117,000
  - Density: 2,282.7/km^{2} (5,912/sq mi)

Languages
  - Official: Marathi
- Time zone: UTC+5:30 (IST)
- PIN Code: 442705

Aheri is a town and a tehsil and a district sub-division in Gadchiroli district in the Indian state of Maharashtra. It is located on the bank of Pranhita River, a tributary of Godavari River. This town is situated at the border of the Indian states of Maharashtra and Telangana.

== Geography ==
There is a bridge on the River Pranhita creating a physical link between Aheri in Maharashtra and Gudem, Komaram Bheem Asifabad district in Telangana. It lies on the National Highway 353C connecting with both Maharashtra and Telangana.

Lakka Metta is a heritage site in Aheri taluka, about 40 kilometres (25 mi) from Aheri, and is believed to be the site where Pandavas took shelter during their vanvasa period in the Hindu epic Mahabharata. It is believed to be the site of Lakshagruh (house of lac), which was set on fire by their enemy cousins Kauravas. (Note: Various other places in Uttar Pradesh, Uttarkhand, etc also claim to be the site of mythological lakshagruh.)

== Governance and infrastructure ==
Aheri is among the few Scheduled Area listed under Gadhiroli district by Government Of India. As of November 2026, it is amongst the nine 9 Nagar Panchayat present in Gadchiroli district. Aheri falls under the Aheri Assembly constituency for the Maharashtra Vidhan Sabha and under the Gadchiroli–Chimur Lok Sabha constituency for the Lok Sabha. Aheri is a sub-division of Gadchiroli district and consist of Aheri, Etapalli, Bhamragad and Sironcha tehsils. Locals have also made claims to create Aheri as a separate district from Gadchiroli. In 2015, Lokmat reported incidences of encroachment by various shops on main roads of Aheri and increase of property rates due to expected district status.

In November 2025, a government hospital for women and children was opened in Aheri with 100 beds facility. It was inaugurated by the CM of Maharashtra, Devendra Fadnavis and was completed at cost of ₹83 crore (US$8.9 million). Earlier, the advanced maternity care patients had to travel to Chandrapur or Nagpur. However, in June 2026 locals protested with a Taala Thoko (Lock it up) andolan as major specialist doctor and administrative posts were still vacant after so many months.

Aheri has the Judicial Magistrate First Class (JMFC) court since 2015 and in 2023 a Sessions Court was inaugrated by B. R. Gavai.

== Demographics ==
As per Indian government census of year 2011, the population of tehsil was 1,16,992.

Year	Male	Female	Total Population	Change	Religion (%)							
Year	Male	Female	Total Population	Change	Hindu	Muslim	Christian	Sikhs	Buddhist	Jain	Other religions and persuasions	Religion not stated
2001	52402	51357	103759	-	86.606	3.112	0.399	0.050	8.007	0.015	1.401	0.409
2011	58916	58076	116992	0.128	86.994	3.083	0.400	0.050	8.032	0.011	1.086	0.344
