= Kudal taluka =

Kudal taluka is a taluka in Sindhudurg district of Maharashtra, India.
