= Gadchiroli district =

- District of Maharashtra
- Gadchiroli
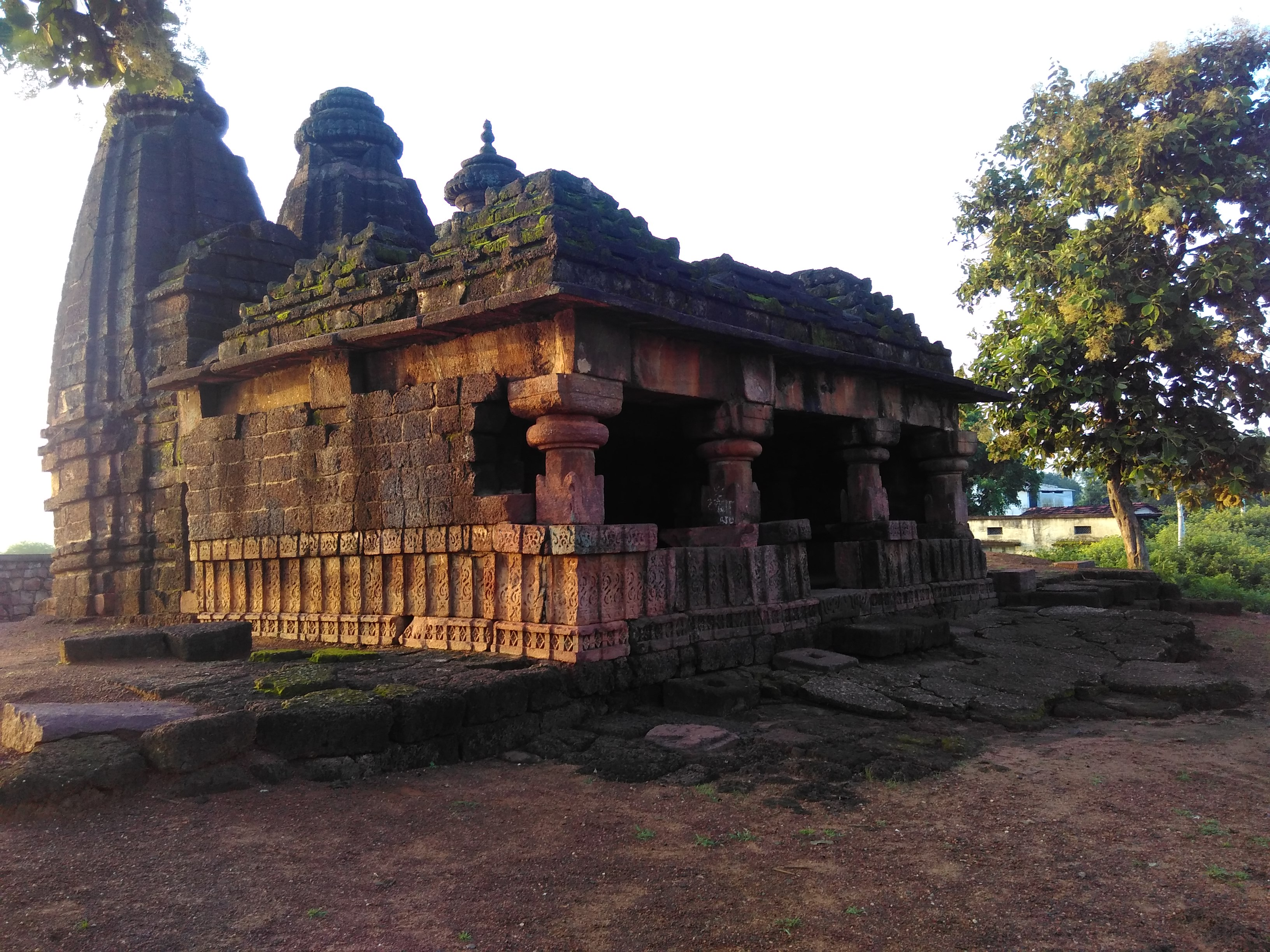
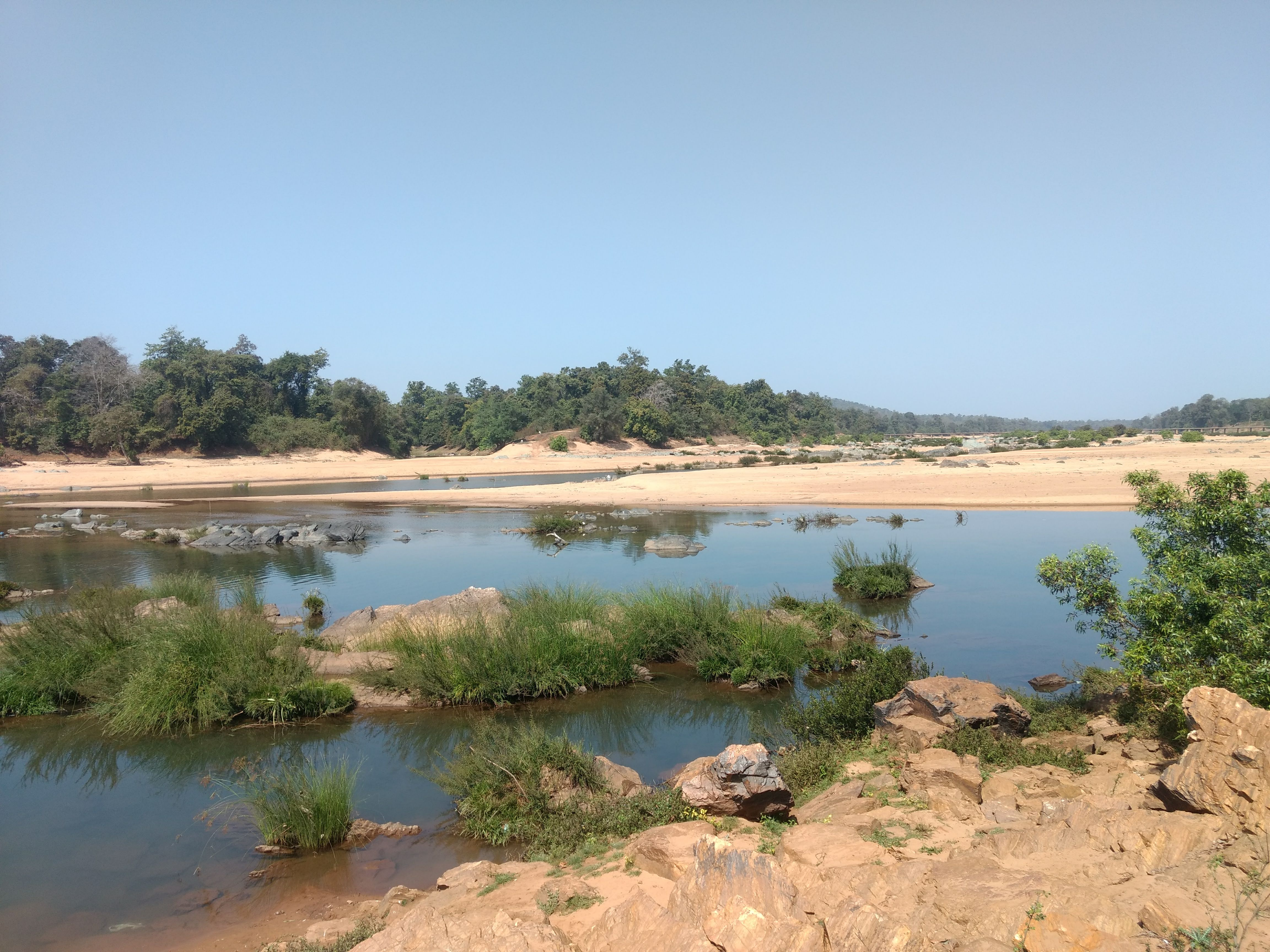
- Top: Temple in Armori; Bottom: Kotri river near Bhamragad

- Location in Maharashtra
- Coordinates (Gadchiroli): 20°11′10″N 80°00′19″E
- Country: India
- State: Maharashtra
- Division: Nagpur Division
- Headquarters: Gadchiroli
- Tehsils: List: 1. Gadchiroli, 2. Armori, 3. Chamorshi, 4. Mulchera, 5. Aheri, Gadchiroli, 6. Sironcha, 7. Etapalli, 8. Bhamragad, 9. Desaiganj, 10. Dhanora, 11. Kurkheda, 12. Korchi

Government
  - Body: Gadchiroli Zilla Parishad
  - Guardian Minister: Devendra Fadnavis; Chief Minister
  - District Collector: Shri. Avishyant Panda (IAS)
  - CEO Zilla Parishad: Shri. Suhas Gade (IAS)
  - MPs: Namdeo Kirsan (Gadchiroli–Chimur)

Area
  - Total: 14,412 km^{2} (5,565 sq mi)

Population (2011)
  - Total: 1,072,942
  - Density: 74.448/km^{2} (192.82/sq mi)
  - Urban: 6.93%

Demographics
  - Literacy: 60.1%
  - Sex ratio: 976
- Vehicle registration: MH-33
- Major highways: NH 63, NH 353C, NH 353D, NH 542 & NH 930
- Average annual precipitation: 1704 mm
- Website: Official website

Gadchiroli district (Marathi pronunciation: [ɡəɖt͡ʃiɾoliː]) is an administrative district in Maharashtra, India. The city of Gadchiroli is the administrative headquarters of the district.

== Officer ==
=== Members of Parliament ===
- Namdeo Kirsan (INC)
  (Gadchiroli–Chimur)

=== Guardian Minister ===
Guardian Minister Gadchiroli
- पालकमंत्री गडचिरोली
- Emblem of India

- Incumbent; Devendra Fadnavis; Chief Minister since 27 September 2022
- Style: The Honourable
- Residence: Mumbai Sagar Bangla
- Appointer: Chief Minister of Maharashtra
- Term length: 5 years / No time limit
- Website: gadchiroli.gov.in/en/

==== List of Guardian Minister ====
Name	Term of office
R. R. Patil; Cabinet Minister	18 October 1999 – 16 January 2003
R. R. Patil; Cabinet Minister	27 January 2003 – 19 October 2004
R. R. Patil; Deputy Chief Minister	1 November 2004 – 4 December 2008
R. R. Patil; Cabinet Minister	8 December 2008 – 6 November 2009
R. R. Patil; Cabinet Minister	7 November 2009 – 11 November 2010
R. R. Patil; Cabinet Minister	11 November 2010 – 26 September 2014
Raje Ambrishrao Raje Satyawan Rao Atram; Minister of State	31 October 2014 – 24 October 2019
Eknath Shinde; Cabinet Minister	9 January 2020 - 27 June 2022
Vijay Wadettiwar; Cabinet Minister; Additional charge	27 June 2022 - 29 June 2022
Devendra Fadnavis; Deputy Chief Minister	24 September 2022 - 26 November 2024
Devendra Fadnavis; Chief Minister	18 January 2025 - Incumbent

=== District Magistrate/Collector ===
District Magistrate / Collector Gadchiroli
- जिल्हाधिकारी तथा जिल्हदंडाधिकरी गडचिरोली
- Emblem of India
- Incumbent; Shri. Avishyant Panda (IAS) since 2024
- Residence: At Gadchiroli district
- Appointer: Government of Maharashtra
- Term length: No time limit
- Website: gadchiroli.gov.in/en/

==== list of District Magistrate / Collector ====
Name	Term of office
Shri. Avishyant Panda (IAS)	2024 - Incumbent

== Extent and history ==
Maharashtra tapers in the east, where this district forms the south-east corner. The district is bordered by Gondia district to the north, Mohla-Manpur-Ambagarh Chowki, Kanker, Narayanpur and Bijapur districts of Chhattisgarh to the east, Jayashankar Bhupalpally district of Telangana to the south, and Mancherial and Komaram Bheem districts of Telangana and Chandrapur district to the west.

- Gadchiroli District was created on 26 August 1982 by the separation of Gadchiroli and Sironcha talukas from Chandrapur district.

== Strategic planning ==
The district is currently a part of the Red Corridor, in the eastern, central and southern parts of India where the Naxalite–Maoist insurgency has the strongest presence.

== Divisions ==
The district is organized into six revenue sub-divisions: Gadchiroli, Aheri, Chamorshi, Etapalli, Desaiganj (Navi Wadsa), and Kurkheda. Each sub-division is further split into two talukas. The Gadchiroli sub-division includes Gadchiroli and Dhanora talukas, while the Chamorshi sub-division consists of Chamorshi and Mulchera talukas. Aheri sub-division covers Aheri and Sironcha talukas, and Etapalli sub-division includes Etapalli and Bhamragad talukas. The Wadsa (Desaiganj) sub-division comprises Wadsa and Armori talukas, and the Kurkheda sub-division contains Kurkheda and Korchi talukas. The district has to 557 gram panchayats (village councils) and 1,688 Revenue Villages. Additionally, there are 12 panchayat samitis (local government development blocks). The district has three municipalities: Gadchiroli, Wadsa (Desaiganj), and Armori.

Following the delimitation of the constituencies in 2008, the district had three Vidhan Sabha (legislative assembly) constituencies: Gadchiroli, Armori and Aheri. All of these are part of the newly carved Gadchiroli-Chimur Lok Sabha constituency.

=== Natural geography ===
Established on 26 August 1982 The main river basin of the district is the Godavari, which flows west-to-east and forms the southern boundary of the district. The major tributaries of the Godavari are the Indravati and the Pranhita, the latter of which is formed by the confluence of the Wainganga and the Wardha near Chaprala village of Chamorshi taluka.

Dhanora, Etapalli, Aheri and Sironcha talukas in the eastern part of the district are covered by forest. Hills are found in Bhamragad, Tipagad, Palasgad and Surjagad area. The eastern part of Gadchiroli, bordering Chhattisgarh state, is mainly hilly and is tribal-dominated, similar to neighbouring Bastar region in Chhattisgarh.

== Demographics ==
Historical population
Year	Pop.	±% p.a.
1901	177,244	—
1911	225,086	+2.42%
1921	220,771	−0.19%
1931	254,088	+1.42%
1941	290,730	+1.36%
1951	324,962	+1.12%
1961	386,392	+1.75%
1971	522,229	+3.06%
1981	637,336	+2.01%
1991	787,010	+2.13%
2001	970,294	+2.12%
2011	1,072,942	+1.01%

According to the 2011 census Gadchiroli district has a population of 1,072,942, roughly equal to the nation of Cyprus or the US state of Rhode Island. This gives it a ranking of 424th in India (out of a total of 640). The district has a population density of 74 inhabitants per square kilometre (190/sq mi). Its population growth rate during 2001–2011 was 10.46%. Gadchiroli has a sex ratio of 975 females for every 1000 males, and a literacy rate of 70.55%. 11.00% of the population lived in urban areas. Scheduled castes and Scheduled Tribes made up 120,745 (11.25%) and 415,306 (38.71%) of the population respectively. Almost 85% of the tribals are Gonds, in particular the Madia Gonds.

Religions in Gadchiroli district (2011)
Religion	Percent
Hinduism	86.44%
Buddhism	7.71%
Tribal religion	2.80%
Islam	1.96%
Other or not stated	1.09%

Year	Total Population	Male	Female	Change	Religion (%)							
Year	Total Population	Male	Female	Change	Hindu	Muslim	Christian	Sikhs	Buddhist	Jain	Other religions and persuasions	Religion not stated
2001	970294	491101	479193	-	84.370	1.787	0.353	0.062	8.045	0.038	4.620	0.725
2011	1072942	541328	531614	10.579	86.436	1.963	0.361	0.063	7.707	0.042	2.800	0.626

=== Languages ===
Languages in Gadchiroli district (2011)
1. Marathi (56.1%)
2. Gondi (14.0%)
3. Santali (9.44%)
4. Telugu (8.87%)
5. Bengali (5.12%)
6. Hindi (2.15%)
7. Chhattisgarhi (1.69%)
8. Other (2.64%)

At the time of the 2011 Census of India, 56.08% of the population in the district spoke Marathi, 14.01% Gondi, 9.44% Santali, 8.87% Telugu, 5.12% Bengali, 2.15% Hindi and 1.69% Chhattisgarhi as their first language.

Marathi is the main language in the western and northern parts of the district, while Chhattisgarhi is spoken in Korchi tehsil. Gondi is the dominant language in the eastern parts. Bengali is spoken by refugees in Mulchera tehsil. Telugu speakers are majority in Sironcha tehsil in the far south.

As of 2011 it is the second-least-populous district of Maharashtra (out of 39), after Sindhudurg.

== Economy ==
The district is categorised as tribal and undeveloped, with farming as the main occupation. Forests cover more than 79.36% of the hilly geographical of the district. The district produces bamboo and Tendu leaves, and paddy is the main agricultural product. Other agriculture includes sorghum, linseed, pigeon pea (tur), and wheat.

The only large-scale industry in the district is a paper mill at Ashti in Chamorshi taluka and the paper pulp factory at Desaiganj. There are many rice mills in the district. The Tussar silk worm centre is in Armori taluka. 18.5 kilometres (11.5 mi) of railway lines pass through the district.

The district is known for activity of Naxalites – the People's Liberation Guerrilla Army – who have taken shelter in the dense forests and hills.

In 2006 the Ministry of Panchayati Raj named Gadchiroli among the country's 250 most-backward districts (out of a total of 640). It is one of the twelve districts in Maharashtra currently receiving funds from the Backward Regions Grant Fund Programme (BRGF).

== Health ==
The Lok Biradari Prakalpa (LBP) situated at Hemalkasa in the Bhamragad taluka is one of the major institutions offering healthcare and education services to the local Madia Gond tribals. LBP was envisioned by the late Gandhian, Dr. Murlidhar Devidas Amte, fondly called Baba Amte. His family consisting of Dr. Prakash Amte, Dr. Mandakini Amte and their children currently work at the LBP.

Abhay and Rani Bang are working as Indian activists and community health researchers in the Gadchiroli district. Since 1986 they successfully developed initiatives and programs aimed at reducing infant mortality rates.

== Education ==
The government recently established Gondwana University on dated 27 September 2011 in Gadhchiroli district.

=== High schools ===
• Global media Kerala model E/M school, Allapalli.

- Government English medium school gadchiroli
- Dharmarao High School & Junior College, Allapalli.
- Gondwana Sainiki Vidyalaya, Gadchiroli
- Platinum Jubilee School and Junior College (Science
- Shriniwas High School Ankisa
- Dharmarao High School Sironcha
- Republic English Medium School, Aheri
- School Of Scholars, Gadchiroli
- Rampuri Primary School
- Shri. Shivaji High School, Gadchiroli
- Z.P. High School, Gadchiroli
- Carmel High School, Gadchiroli
- Vasant Vidyalaya High School
- Rani Durgavati High School & Junior College Allapalli
- Netaji Subhash Chandra Jr. College, Sundernagar
- Indira Gandhi Memoriyal High School & Junior College, Subhashgram
- Mahatma Gandhi vidyalaya, Armori
- Dr. Ambedkar vidyalaya, Armori
- Hitakarani high school, Armori
- Swami Vivekanda Vidyalaya, Armori
- Adarsh English High school, Desaiganj (wadsa)
- Mahatma Gandhi Vidyalaya, Desaiganj (Wadsa)
- Dr. Babasaheb Ambedkar Vidyalaya, Desaiganj (Wadsa)
- Pushpa Priya Devi High School & Junior science College Jimalgatta
- Vianney Vidya Niketan (ICSE), Navegaon, Gadchiroli

=== Model school Aheri ===
- Platinum Jubilee School & Jr. College (science)
- School Of Scholars, Gadchiroli
- Shriniwas Junior College, Ankisa
- Z. P. Junior College of Science Sironcha
- Shivaji Junior Science College
- Govt ITI Complex, Gadchiroli
- Mahatma Gandhi junior college, Armori
- N.S.C Jr. College Sundarnagar
- Adarsh English High School & Junior College, Desaiganj (Wadsa)
- Mahatma Gandhi Vidyalaya & Junior College, Desaiganj (Wadsa)

=== Senior (degree) colleges ===
- Bhagvantrao Arts College Sironcha
- Shivaji Science College Gadchiroli
- Mahila Mahavidyalaya, Gadchiroli
- Government Science College, Gadchiroli
- Government Polytechnic, Gadchiroli
- College of Agriculture, Sonapur complex Gadchiroli
- Model College, Gadchiroli
- Fule-Ambedkar College of Social Work, Gadchiroli
- Mahatma Gandhi college, Armori
- Chanakya Academy, Aheri & Alapalli (Competitive Exam Coaching Center)
- Chanakya Academy, Police Physical Ground, Aheri
- Adarsh Mahavidyalaya Art & Com. Desaiganj (Wadsa)

Sainath Adhayapak vidyalaya, Murkhala Prof.Jogendra kawade college Vairagad Shri govindrao Munghate Art and Science college kurkheda

- Raje Vishweshwarrao Arts-Commerce Senior College, Bhamragad, Dist

Gadchiroli

- Raje Dharmrao Arts Commerce College, Allapalli, Dist

Gadchiroli

- Raje Dharmarao Science College, Aher Dist Gadchiroli
- Shree shankarrao bezalwar arts and science college aheri

== Important places ==
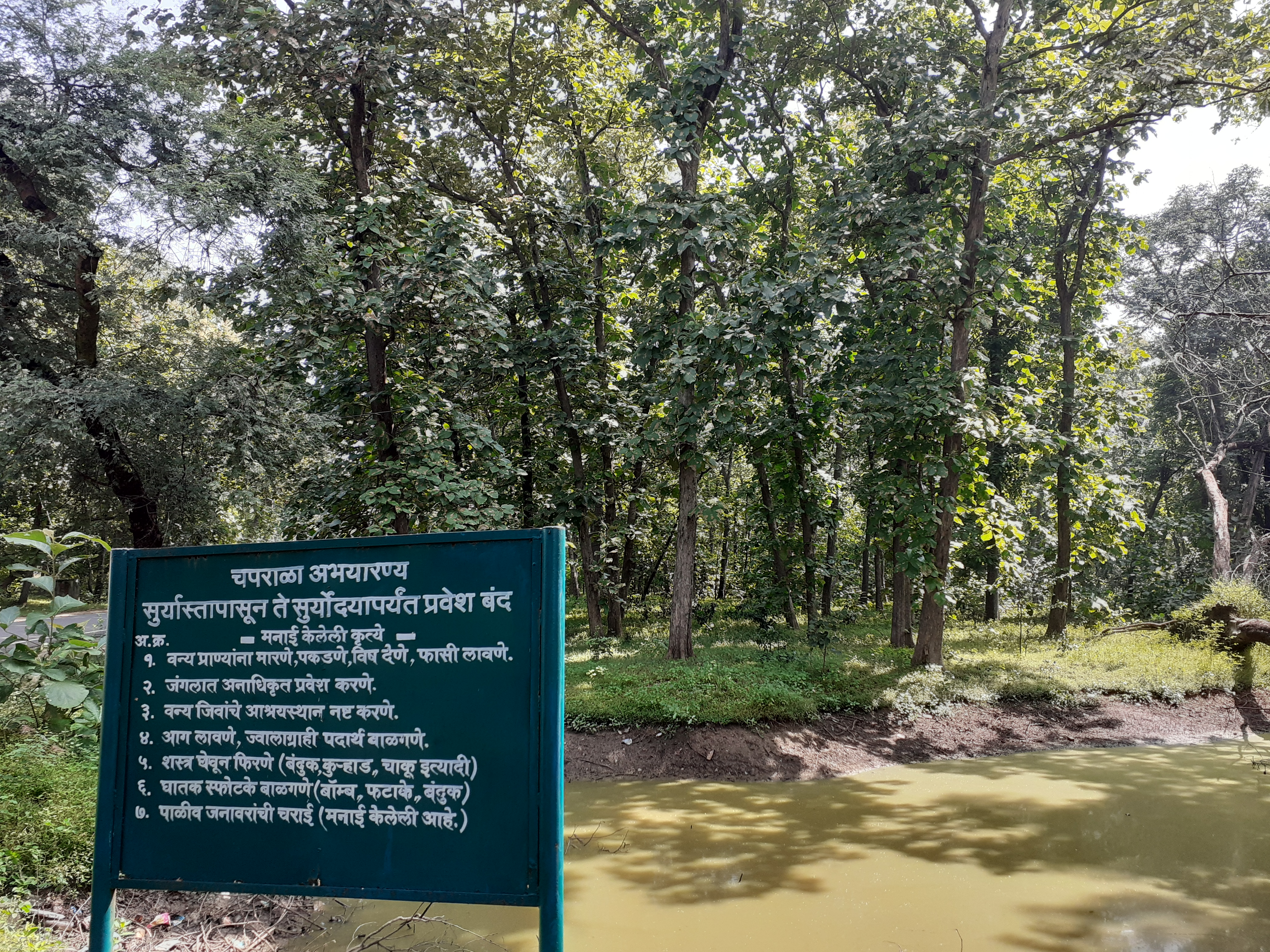
Chaprala Wildlife Sanctuary

- Pranhita Wildlife Sanctuary
- Wadadham Fossil Park, tah, Sironcha
- Chaprala Wildlife Sanctuary, one of the Wildlife sanctuaries of India
- Bhamragarh Wildlife Sanctuary
- Lok Biradari Prakalp, Hemalkasa
- Binagunda waterfall, Bhamragad
- Tipagad, tah. Korchi
- Khobramendha, tag dhanora
- Bhandareshwar temple, tag Armori
- Search hospital, Chatgaon
- Desaiganj Wadsa, market place
- Markanda dev, Tah Chamorshi
- Somnur sangam tah, Sironcha
- Pranhita Sangam tah, Sironcha
- Triveni sangam bhamragad

== See also ==
- Make In India
- Chandrapur
- Gondia
- Nagpur
