= Kurkheda =

- Village
- Location in Maharashtra, India
- Coordinates: 20.37°N 80.12°E
- Country: India
- State: Maharashtra
- District: Gadchiroli

Government
  - Type: Municipal Council
  - Body: Kurkheda Municipal Council
- Elevation: 240 m (790 ft)

Population (2011)
  - Total: 86,073

Languages
  - Official: Marathi
- Time zone: UTC+5:30 (IST)

Kurkheda is a Village and a tehsil in the Gadchiroli district in the Indian state of Maharashtra. According to the 2011 census the village has a population of 379 living in 90 households. Its main agriculture product is paddy growing.

== Geography ==
Kurkheda is located at . It has an average elevation of 240 metres (790 feet).

Kurkheda is a part of the Kurkheda subdivision in the Gadchiroli district. It encompasses a total of 128 villages.

== Demographics ==
As per Indian government census of 2011, the population was 86,073.

Year	Male	Female	Total Population	Change	Religion (%)							
Year	Male	Female	Total Population	Change	Hindu	Muslim	Christian	Sikhs	Buddhist	Jain	Other religions and persuasions	Religion not stated
2001	39626	38310	77936	-	85.459	1.949	0.028	0.012	9.645	0.019	2.855	0.033
2011	43582	42491	86073	10.441	85.367	2.042	0.072	0.020	9.090	0.030	3.096	0.282

== Education ==
Among many schools, Shivaji High School and Junior College is the oldest one.

Shri Govindrao Munghate Arts and Science Degree and PG College is run by the Dandakaranya Educational, Cultural and Research Institute, Gadchiroli. The college is affiliated to the R.T.M. Nagpur University, and to the University Grants Commission Delhi. Dr. R.G. Munghate is the principal of the college. Apart from education, the college is also involved in various socioeconomic research activities in association with different national and international research organisations. One such international project, based on 'Tobacco Use Among the College Students', was successfully carried out. This project was completed in collaboration with the Rockefeller Foundation America and the Tata Institute of Social Science, Mumbai. Sushroosha nursing home is the largest medical facility of Kurkheda, run by Dr.Tejram Buddhe and Mrs. Usha Buddhe.
