= Mulchera =

- Village
- Interactive map of Mulchera
- Country: India
- State: Maharashtra
- District: Gadchiroli

Population (2011)
  - Total: 45,787

Languages
  - Official: Marathi Hindi Bengali
- Time zone: UTC+5:30 (IST)
- PIN: 442707
- Telephone code: 91-7135

Mulchera is a Village and a tehsil located in the Gadchiroli district in the Indian state of Maharashtra. Bank of Maharashtra, GDCC Bank, Maharashtra Gramin Bank are available here.

== Demographics ==
As per Indian government census of 2011, the population of Mulchera taluka was 45787.

Year	Male	Female	Total Population	Change	Religion (%)							
Year	Male	Female	Total Population	Change	Hindu	Muslim	Christian	Sikhs	Buddhist	Jain	Other religions and persuasions	Religion not stated
2001	20231	19380	39611	-	82.755	0.255	0.278	0.020	4.390	0.005	11.934	0.364
2011	23438	22349	45787	15.592	91.231	0.347	0.212	0.022	3.449	0.007	3.713	1.020

View source data.
