= Kankavli taluka =

Coordinates: 16.27°N 73.70°E

Kankavli taluka is a taluka in Sindhudurg district of Maharashtra an Indian state.
