= Etapalli =

Etapalli Etapali
- Village
- Location in Maharashtra, India
- Coordinates: 19.60°N 80.23°E
- Ettapalli: India
- State: Maharashtra
- District: Gadchiroli
- Elevation: 120 m (390 ft)

Population (2011)
  - Total: 81,713

Language
  - Official: Marathi
  - Spoken: Marathi, Madia, Gondi, Halbi
- Time zone: UTC+5:30 (IST)

Etapalli is a village and a tehsil in Gadchiroli district in the Indian state of Maharashtra.

Etapalli is known for its rich forest and a range of mountains called Surjagarh, located at the distance of 15 km from etapalli. It can be reached by road.

The Surjagarh consists of a range of 4 mountains which are straight, nearly vertical, and difficult to climb. Each year, the indigenous people climb them in large numbers when there is a pilgrimage on an auspicious day in the first week of January. This is the only time when the mountains can be climbed due to their religious significance. As is the belief of the tribes, the "bada deo ", the greatest god resides on the mountain; women are not permitted to climb the mountain.

Despite the difficult trek, men of all ages and even children climb up the mountain some with a male goat on their shoulders for sacrifice. These men first worship at the base and they are greeted with dancing. Numerous crowds of women, children, and other people wait at base for the men of honor to climb up and come down safely from the dangerous place.

The meaning of the name Surjagarh is the fort of the sun. The name is derived from a fort built in a single stone on one of the mountain roof. It is said to have been built by the famous Veer Baburao Sadmake, the freedom fighter. He used the fort for keeping himself and his army safe and hidden from the British army.

Surjagarh is also known for its rich source of iron ore. It is said that the iron ore deposits at Surjagarh are so largethat it can fulfill whole India's iron requirements for next 120 years. Because of the iron deposits, there have been many struggles between mining companies and the villagers. There have also been many incidences of bloodshed supposedly related to this mining.

Despite the disapproval of the natives of Surjagarh, thousands of mature trees were cut down; the forest of Surjagarh suffered serious loss

The villagers claimed that the former state government and the mining companies deceived the villagers by taking a fake approval from dummy villagers that they presented at a general meeting which took place 45 km from Surjagarh. This matter was raised at an international indigenous peoples conference organized by the United Nations by one of the activists, Lalsu Nogoti.

== Demographics ==
As per the 2011 census of India, the population of the tehsil was 81,713.

Year	Male	Female	Total Population	Change	Religion (%)							
Year	Male	Female	Total Population	Change	Hindu	Muslim	Christian	Sikhs	Buddhist	Jain	Other religions and persuasions	Religion not stated
2001	35776	34851	70627	-	92.204	0.483	1.887	0.024	2.179	0.011	3.013	0.198
2011	40959	40754	81713	15.697	92.362	0.792	1.357	0.016	1.919	0.011	2.291	1.252
