= Gadchiroli =

- City
- Interactive map of Gadchiroli
- Coordinates: 20.185°N 79.984°E
- Country: India
- State: Maharashtra
- District: Gadchiroli
- Established: 26 August 1982
- Founder: Khandkya Ballal Shah

Government
  - Type: Municipal Council
  - Body: Gadchiroli Municipal Council
  - Chairperson: Yogita Pipare

Area
  - Total: 30 km^{2} (12 sq mi)

Population (2011)
  - Total: 54,152
  - Density: 1,800/km^{2} (4,700/sq mi)

Language
  - Official: Marathi
- Time zone: UTC+5:30 (IST)
- Postal code: 442605
- 8999862636: 07132
- Vehicle registration: MH-33
- Website: www.gadchiroli.gov.in

Gadchiroli ( [ɡəɖt͡ʃiɾoliː]) is a city and a municipal council in Gadchiroli district in the state of Maharashtra, central India. It is located in eastern Maharashtra, and is the administrative headquarters of the district. Gadchiroli is called the lung of Maharashtra as almost 70% of this district is covered by forests having 21% of the total forest cover of the state. The main river flowing through city is the Wainganga River. The landscape is lush and green during the monsoon season which is prone to flooding. Gadchiroli is known for its forests. Teak is grown commercially and bamboos are used for various crafts.

== Notable places and Personalities ==
Some notable places and personalities in the town include:

- Chaprala Wildlife Sanctuary
- Semana-Hanuman Temple – About 4 km (2.5 mi) from center of town (Gandhi Chowk)
- Hemalkasa – Situated in Bhamragarh Block (east side of district), 186 km (116 mi) from Gadchiroli.
- Allapalli – Known as Teak City of District, where all forest administration offices and the main marketline, educational and other resources.
- Markhanda – A temple dedicated to Lord Shiva on the banks of Wainganga. There is a big fair on Mahashivratri
- BILT (Ashti) – A unit of Ballarpur Paper Mills in Ashti.
- Gadchiroli lake – located at the centre of the city.
- Vairagad Fort – Built by the Gond kings as their residence and fortress, near Armori town
- Bhandareshwar – An ancient temple to Lord Shiva situated to the west of Vairagad village, high on a mound at the confluence of the Khobragadi and Vainlochna rivers. This shrine is a good example of architecture and the carved walls are believed to be from the Hemadpanth period.
- Adishakti Temple – Situated at Vairagad, this temple enshrines an idol of Adishakti Devi, found during a 1986 excavation. The idol has four hands and is an example of the carvings undertaken by the sculptors of the erstwhile era.
- Wadadham Fossils Park.

== History ==
In ancient times the region was ruled by the Mauryan empire, Gupta empire, Rashtrakutas, the Chalukyas, the Yadavas of Deogiri and later the Gonds of Gadchiroli. In the 13th century Khandkya Ballal Shah founded Chandrapur and made it his capital. Chandrapur subsequently came under Maratha rule. In 1853 Berar, of which Chandrapur (then called Chanda) was part, was ceded to the British East India Company. In 1854 Chandrapur became an independent district of Berar.

In 1905 the British created the tehsil of Gadchiroli by transfer of a zamindari estate from Chandrapur and Bramhapuri. It was part of the Central Provinces until 1956 when, with the reorganisation of the states, Chandrapur was transferred to Bombay state. In 1960, when Maharashtra was created, Chandrapur became a district of the new state. On 26 August 1982 Chandrapur was divided, with Gadchiroli tehsil becoming an independent district.

Naxalism is highly prevalent in Gadchiroli, with the guerrilla fighters taking to the hills and dense forests, 15 soldiers have been killed in an IED blast at Kurkheda area in 2019. Gadchiroli has also been designated as part of the Red Corridor. Settlements are being explored by many social workers.

== Geography ==
Gadchiroli is located at 20.10°N 80.0°E. It has an average elevation of 217 metres (715 feet). Gadchiroli District is one of the largest in Maharashtra by land area. The town and surrounding area is considered to be beautiful during the monsoon season (July to September), and is surrounded by a teak wood forest.

=== Climate ===
Located near centre of Indian peninsula, far from the Bay of Bengal and the Arabian Sea, Gadchiroli has a tropical wet-and-dry climate with dry conditions prevailing for most of the year. It receives an annual rainfall of about 1,000 mm (39 in), almost entirely from monsoon rains between June and September. Summers are extremely hot lasting from March to June, with maximum temperatures occurring in May.

== Demographics ==
According to the 2001 India census, Gadchiroli had a population of 42,464. Males constituted 51% of the population and females 49%. Gadchiroli had an average literacy rate of 74%, higher than the national average of 59.5%. Male literacy was 80%, and female literacy was 67%. 13% of the population was under 6 years of age.

The main languages spoken are Marathi, Hindi, Gondi, Madiya, Bengali and Telugu. The literacy rate is improving with an increase in educational facilities.

The people of Gadchiroli celebrate many indigenous festivals. Adivasi peoples celebrate festivals like Mohram, Pola, etc. The Bengali community here celebrate festivals like Durga Pooja, Basanti Pooja, Kali pooja, etc.

Year	Male	Female	Total Population	Change	Religion (%)							
Year	Male	Female	Total Population	Change	Hindu	Muslim	Christian	Sikhs	Buddhist	Jain	Other religions and persuasions	Religion not stated
2001	21758	20710	42468	-	79.255	6.518	0.280	0.207	12.883	0.250	0.586	0.021
2011	27569	26583	54152	27.512	79.308	5.599	0.303	0.199	13.431	0.246	0.404	0.510

== Health care ==
- Abhay and Rani Bang are founders and activists and community health researchers working successfully in the Gadchiroli district. They have developed in about 20 years initiatives and programs aimed at reducing infant mortality rates.
- Society For Education, Action, and Research in Community Health (SEARCH), which is involved in rural health services.

== Industrialisation ==
The Surjagarh region of Gadchiroli is among the largest reserves of iron ore in Maharashtra. Mining activities have been proposed in the region since 2005, but local opposition and conflict kept companies at bay. In 2021, Lloyd's Metals and Energy Limited was granted the rights to restart these operations, this time, with Thriveni Earthmovers Pvt. Ltd., an Indian mining operations company.

The Maharashtra Government has been pushing Gadchiroli as the next Steel Hub of India too. In these efforts, the Managing Director of Thriveni Earthmovers, Mr. B. Prabhakaran, seems to be the front runner, often credited with the restart of the mining operations in 2021. The Surjagad Iron Ore Mines is set to ramp up production to 25 MTPA.

The mining activities have increased employment in the region, and a slew of community development activities, including the building of a school, helping students with higher education, opening a hospital, a sports academy, organising blood donation camps, has significantly improved the standard of living in the region, keeping internal conflict at bay.

Following their footsteps, a number of steel and mining companies are set to enter the region in the next five years.

== Administration ==
=== Politics ===
The MP of Gadchiroli-Chimur constituency is dr Namdevrao kirsan. The MLA from different constituencies within are:

- Aheri – Dharmarao Baba Atram
- Gadchiroli – Dr. Milind Ramji Narote
- Armori – Ramdas Maluji Masram

== Transport ==
Gadchiroli is connected by roads to Chandrapur, Nagpur, Bhandara and Gondia. There is no rail connection in Gadchiroli .The condition of roadways in the area is being improved to provide improved security against the recent Naxilite insurgency.

== Education ==
All the degree colleges in Gadchiroli are now affiliated with the recently established Gondwana University, Gadchiroli. The government of Maharashtra established Gondwana university by splitting RTM Nagpur University, purported to be a major revolution in education for the tribal youth in the district.

1. Namdeorao Poreddiwar College of Engineering and Technology was a technical college located at Mouza Bodli, Gadchiroli but now is closed due to some administrative reasons.
2. Government Medical College
- Chanakya Academy Aheri & Alapalli (Competitive Exam Coaching Center)
- Chanakya Academy Police Bharti Physical Ground, Aheri

== See also ==
- Make In Maharashtra
