= Nagpur-Bhandara-Gondia Expressway =

Expressway

- Nagpur-Bhandara-Gondia Access Controlled Super Communication Expressway
- Expressway highlighted in red

Route information
- Maintained by MSRDC
- Length: 162.377 km (100.896 mi)
- Existed: Dec 2024 (expected)–present

Major junctions
- West end: Gavasi Village, Nagpur district
- East end: Sawari Village, Gondia district

Location
- Country: India
- States: Maharashtra
- Major cities: Nagpur, Bhandara, Tirora, and Gondia

Highway system
- Roads in India; Expressways; National; State; Asian

The Nagpur-Bhandara-Gondia Expressway, officially named the Nagpur-Bhandara-Gondia Access Controlled Super Communication Expressway, is a planned six to four-lane greenfield project that connects the cities of Vidarbha which are Nagpur, Bhandara, Tirora and Gondia to Mumbai-Nagpur Expressway. Proposed as six to four lanes wide, this segment will reduce the road distance between Nagpur special economic zone (SEZ) and Bhandara-Gondia and bring down travel time between Nagpur SEZ and Bhandara-Gondia further to Mumbai, the capital of the state .

== Route alignment ==
The Nagpur-Bhandara-Gondia Expressway will travel through Nagpur, Bhandara, and Gondia districts directly. The Expressway will have six lanes from Nagpur to Bhandara to cater to high traffic and four lanes from Bhandara to Gondia due to moderate traffic between sections.

=== Cities and towns ===
Below are the lists of cities/towns through which the Nagpur-Bhandara-Gondia Expressway will connect:

- South of Nagpur
- North of Kuhi
- West and North of Bhandara
- East of Tirora
- North and South of Gondia

== Construction ==
MSRDC applied for Environmental Clearance in October 2023 and invited bids for civil construction in February 2024 with a 2.5-year construction deadline. Bids were opened in early May to reveal 8 firms had submitted a total of 20 bids.

Sr. No.	Package				Location		Length in km		Contractor
Sr. No.	Code	Chainage in km	Route		Taluka	District	Length in km		Contractor
1.	NG-01	0.000 to 29.400	Gavsi To Chanoda		Nagpur Rural	Nagpur	29.400		Afcons Infrastructure Ltd.
1.	NG-01	0.000 to 29.400	Gavsi To Chanoda		Umred	Nagpur	29.400		Afcons Infrastructure Ltd.
1.	NG-01	0.000 to 29.400	Gavsi To Chanoda		Kuhi	Nagpur	29.400		Afcons Infrastructure Ltd.
2.	NG-02	29.400 to 58.850	Chanoda to Thana		Kuhi	Nagpur	29.450		Afcons Infrastructure Ltd.
2.	NG-02	29.400 to 58.850	Chanoda to Thana		Mauda	Nagpur	29.450		Afcons Infrastructure Ltd.
2.	NG-02	29.400 to 58.850	Chanoda to Thana		Bhandara	Bhandara	29.450		Afcons Infrastructure Ltd.
3.	NG-02A	58.850 to 94.100	Thana to Jambhapani		Bhandara	Bhandara	35.250		Patel Infrastructure Ltd.
3.	NG-02A	58.850 to 94.100	Thana to Jambhapani		Mohadi	Bhandara	35.250		Patel Infrastructure Ltd.
4.	NG-03	94.100 to 121.500	Manora to Sonegaon		Tirora	Gondia	27.400	31.226	NCC Ltd.
4.	NG-03	0.000 to 3.826	Tiroda Connector	Paldongari to Kachewani	Tirora	Gondia	3.826	31.226	NCC Ltd.
5.	NG-04	121.500 to 144.807	Sonegaon to Sawari		Tirora	Gondia	23.307	37.052	NCC Ltd.
5.	NG-04	121.500 to 144.807	Sonegaon to Sawari		Gondia	Gondia	23.307	37.052	NCC Ltd.
5.	NG-04	0.000 to 13.745	Gondia Bypass	Lohari to Karanja	Gondia	Gondia	13.745	37.052	NCC Ltd.
5.	NG-04	0.000 to 13.745	Gondia Bypass	Lohari to Karanja	Goregaon	Gondia	13.745	37.052	NCC Ltd.

== See also ==
- Expressways in India
- Maharashtra State Road Development Corporation
- Mumbai–Nagpur Expressway
