= Bhandara Chinnor rice =

Type of non-Basmati aromatic rice from Maharashtra, India

Bhandara Chinoor rice (भंडारा चिन्नोर तांदूळ)
- Geographical indication
- Alternative names: Bhandara Chinnor
- Description: Bhandara Chinoor rice is an aromatic rice cultivated in Maharashtra
- Type: Aromatic rice
- Area: Bhandara district
- Country: India
- Registered: 1 July 2023
- Official website: ipindia.gov.in

Bhandara Chinoor rice is a variety of non-Basmati aromatic rice mainly grown in the Indian state of Maharashtra. It is a common and widely cultivated crop in talukas of Bhandara, Pauni, Tumsar, Mohadi, Sakoli, Lakhani, and Lakhandur of Bhandara district.

Under its Geographical Indication (GI) tag, it is referred to as "Bhandara Chinoor Rice".

Chinnor rice is mainly produced in the Balaghat district of Madhya Pradesh known as Balaghat Chinnor for which GI tag was received in September 2021, although it is also produced in Bhandara, Maharashtra, for which a separate GI tag was claimed by Maharashtra in 2023. Geographically, Bhandara district is enveloped by Balaghat district on the north.

== Historical records ==
This variety of rice has been cultivated in the Bhandara district for generations, with many farming families growing this rice variety for over 100 years. In the book "Races of Rice in India," Chinnor Rice is mentioned as 'Chinoor,' noting its significance in Bhandara District since 1867. Initially, Chinnor rice was consumed by landowners in the area.

== Name ==
Bhandara Chinoor rice is a prized crop in Bhandara and so named after it. "Chinoor", "Chinnor" or "Chinnaur" is an acronym of the Hindi term “Chiknaiyukt Nokdaar Sugangdhit Chavur” which means Chiknaiyukt (Oily content), Nokdaar (Sharp tipped), Sugangdhit (Aromatic) and Chavur (Local name for Rice).

The word "Chinoor" (variations like "Chinnor", "Chinnur" or "Chinnaur") has its roots in three distinct components:

1. Chi: Derived from "Chiknai Yukt," indicating the rice's high oil content.
2. Nau: Originating from "Nokdaar," meaning sharp tip, referring to the rice grain's shape.
3. R: Simply denoting "rice"

=== Local name ===
It is known as Bhandara Chinnor rice (भंडारा चिन्नोर तांदूळ) or simply only as Chinoor rice.

== Description ==
Bhandara Chinoor rice is an aromatic, and endemic rice variety from Maharashtra. High aroma arises from a mixture of compounds like alcohols, aldehydes, esters, and 2-Acetyl-1-pyrroline (2AP). This rice is tender and non-sticky, remaining firm after cooking. It is fat-free and gluten-free with a high elongation ratio. The medium-grain rice is soft to the touch, white in color, and hard in texture with a shelf life of 18 months, offering a sweet and appealing taste:

== Geographical indication ==
It was awarded the Geographical Indication (GI) status tag from the Geographical Indications Registry under the Union Government of India on 1 July 2023, and is valid until 30 April 2030.

Bhandara Chinoor Dhan Utpadak Sangh from Pauni, proposed the GI registration of Bhandara Chinoor rice. After filing the application in May 2020, the rice was granted the GI tag in 2023 by the Geographical Indication Registry in Chennai, making the name "Bhandara Chinoor rice" exclusive to the rice grown in the region. It thus became the third rice variety from Maharashtra and the 35th type of goods from Maharashtra to earn the GI tag.

The GI tag protects the rice from illegal selling and marketing, and gives it legal protection and a unique identity.
