= State Highway 253 (Maharashtra) =

Road in Maharashtra, India

State Highway 253

Route information
- Maintained by MSRDC
- Length: 33 km (21 mi)

Major junctions
- South end: Mauda, Nagpur
- North end: Ramtek, Nagpur

Location
- Country: India
- State: Maharashtra
- Districts: Nagpur
- Primary destinations: Mauda, Nagardan, Ramtek

Highway system
- Roads in India; Expressways; National; State; Asian; State Highways in Maharashtra

Maharashtra State Highway 253 (MH SH 253) is a normal state highway in Nagpur, in the state of Maharashtra. This state highway touches Mauda, Nagardan, Ramtek, connecting with NH-6 at Mauda.

== Summary ==
This road is one of the important roads in Nagpur District providing connectivity with two National Highways, NH-6 and NH-7 just 5 km from Ramtek through MH SH 249.

== Major junctions ==
This highway started from the intersection at Mauda town with NH-7 and end at Ramtek city connecting with MH SH 249. MH SH 266 is also connecting with this highway near Tarsa village.

== Connections ==
Many villages, cities and towns in Nagpur District are connecting by this state highway.

- Mauda
- Tarsa
- Nagardan
- Ramtek

Few other important landmark on this highway.

- NTPC Mauda Super Thermal Power Station
- Kavikulguru Institute of Technology & Science, Ramtek.
- Kavi Kulguru Kalidas Sanskrit University, Ramtek.
- Parmatma Ek Sevak Manavdharm Aashram.
- Surya Laxmi Cotton Mill.
- Hindalco Industry Ltd, Mauda.
- DCL Polyester Plant(RIL)

== See also ==
- List of state highways in Maharashtra
