= Sur (Maharashtra) =

River in Bhandara

Sur River
- Sur River Location in Bhandara and Nagpur District, MH, India
- Native name: सुर नदी (Marathi)

Location
- Country: India
- State: Maharashtra
- Districts: Nagpur and Bhandara
- Talukas: Ramtek, Mauda, Mohadi and Bhandara
- Cities: Bhandara

Physical characteristics
- Source: Forest Hills
  - location: Near North of Maharapeth (R), Ramtek Taluka, Nagpur District, Maharashtra, India
  - coordinates: 21°30′04″N 79°22′29″E
  - elevation: 373 m (1,224 ft)
- Mouth: Wainganga River
  - location: Between Bhandara City and Old Takli Village, Bhandara Taluka, Bhandara District, Maharashtra, India
  - coordinates: 21°10′52″N 79°40′52″E
  - elevation: 239 m (784 ft)

Basin features
- Tributaries
  - left: Gaimukh River

The Sur (Note: IAST: Sur) is a river in India. It is a key tributary of the Wainganga. The river flows south in a winding course through the Vidarbha region of Maharashtra.

== Course ==
The start stream of Sur originate at forest Hills near Maharapeth (R) in Ramtek Taluka of Nagpur district. The Sur river flows through Ramtek and Mauda Taluka of Nagpur district and Mohadi and Bhandara Taluka of Bhandara district respectively. This river irrigates lands where rice is cultivation as main crop which is part of Bhandara cluster.

== Dams ==
Ramtek Dam: It is an earthfill dam on Sur, Maharashtra (river) near Ramtek, Nagpur district in the state of Maharashtra in India. The height of the dam above lowest foundation is 22.2 m (73 ft) while the length is 229 m (751 ft). The volume content is 1,300 km^{3} (310 mi^{3}) and gross storage capacity is 105,130 km^{3} (25,220 mi^{3}).

== Notes and references ==
Notes

Citations
