= Palandur =

Village in Maharashtra

- Village
- Palandur Location in Lakhani Taluka
- Coordinates: 20.9189°N 79.8594°E
- Country: India
- State: Maharashtra
- Region: Vidharba
- District: Bhandara
- Taluka: Lakhani

Government
  - Type: Grampanchayat
  - Body: Palandur Grampanchayat
- Elevation: 239 m (784 ft)

Population (2011)
  - Total: 4,739
- Demonym: Palandurwasi

Languages
  - Official: Marathi
- Time zone: UTC+5:30 (IST)
- PIN: 441809
- Telephone code: +917186
- Vehicle registration: MH-36
- Nearest city: Bhandara
- Lok Sabha constituency: Bhandara-Gondiya (Lok Sabha constituency)
- Vidhan Sabha constituency: Sakoli (Vidhan Sabha constituency)

Palandur is a village in the Lakhani Taluka of Bhandara District of Maharashtra state in India. It is located 10 km from Dighori on National Highway 353C.
