= Khairlanji =

Village in Maharashtra

- Village
- Interactive map of Khairlanji
- Coordinates: 21.369021°N 79.571442°E
- Country: India
- State: Maharashtra
- Region: Vidharba
- District: Bhandara
- Taluka: Mohadi

Government
  - Type: Gram Panchayat

Area
  - Total: 3.7 km^{2} (1.4 sq mi)
  - Rank: 50th biggest in Taluka
  - Forest: 0.55 km^{2} (0.21 sq mi)
- Elevation: 289 m (948 ft)

Population (2011)
  - Total: 775
  - Rank: 36th least populous in Taluka
  - Density: 210/km^{2} (540/sq mi)
- Demonym: Khairlanjiwasi

Languages
  - Official: Marathi
  - Coofficial: English
- Time zone: UTC+5:30 (IST)
- PIN: 441914
- Telephone code: +917197xxxxxx
- Vehicle registration: MH-36 (Under Bhandara RTO)
- Nearest city: Mohadi
- Lok Sabha constituency: Bhandara-Gondiya (Lok Sabha constituency)
- Vidhan Sabha constituency: Tumsar (Vidhan Sabha constituency)

Khairlanji is a village in Mohadi taluka of Bhandara district of Maharashtra, India. The village was in the limelight following to 2006 Khairlanji massacre a Dalit family by members of the Kunbi caste, a backward caste in India.
