= Warthi, Bhandara =

Warthi
- Village
- Warthi Location in Mohadi Taluka
- Coordinates: 21.2378°N 79.6445°E
- Country: India
- State: Maharashtra
- Region: Vidarbha
- District: Bhandara
- Taluka: Mohadi

Government
  - Type: Gram Panchayat
  - Body: Warthi Grampanchayat

Area
  - Total: 4.36 km^{2} (1.68 sq mi)
- Elevation: 265 m (869 ft)

Population
  - Total: 13,058
  - Density: 2,990/km^{2} (7,760/sq mi)
- Demonym: Warthiwasi

Languages
  - Official: Marathi
  - Additional Official: English
- Time zone: UTC+5:30 (IST)
- PIN: 441905
- Telephone code: +917184
- Vehicle registration: MH-36

Warthi is a large village in the Mohadi Taluka in the Bhandara district of the Indian state of Maharashtra. Warthi is known for its steel industries.

== Transport ==
It is situated on newly declared National Highway NH 543K which connects cities of Bhandara and Balaghat in Maharashtra and Madhya Pradesh respectively. It hosts the Bhandara Road Railway Station.

== Education ==
The Government College of Education is a school in Warthi. A private school is run by the iron and steel industry, for children of employees and local people. This school is affiliated with the Central Board of Secondary Education.

== Demographics ==
Warthi has a population of 13,058. Out of this total 6,629 are males and 6,429 are females.

The population of children between the age of 0-6 is 1,443. This is 11.05 % of the total population. The literacy rate is 90.75%, higher than the state average of 82.34%. In Warthi, male literacy is approximately 94.91% while female literacy is 86.49 %.

The villagers speak the Marathi Language.

== Religion ==
Religion in Warthi (2011)
1. Hinduism (67.6%)
2. Buddhism (27.2%)
3. Islam (4.07%)
4. Christianity (0.47%)
5. Sikhism (0.31%)
6. Jainism (0.25%)
7. Not stated (0.16%)

Religions in Warthi
Religion	Percent
Hindus	67.57%
Buddhist	27.16%
Muslims	4.07%
Christians	0.47%
Sikh	0.31%
Jains	0.25%
Others	0.16%

Hinduism is the predominant religion in Warthi, followed by Buddhism and Islam.
