= Tarsa =

Tarsa may refer to:

- Tarsus (city), ancient city in Cilicia
- Tarsa, India, village in Mouda tahasil of Nagpur district of Maharashtra, India
- Târsa (disambiguation), places in Romania
