= Shivnala (Gondi) =

Village in Maharashtra, India

- Village
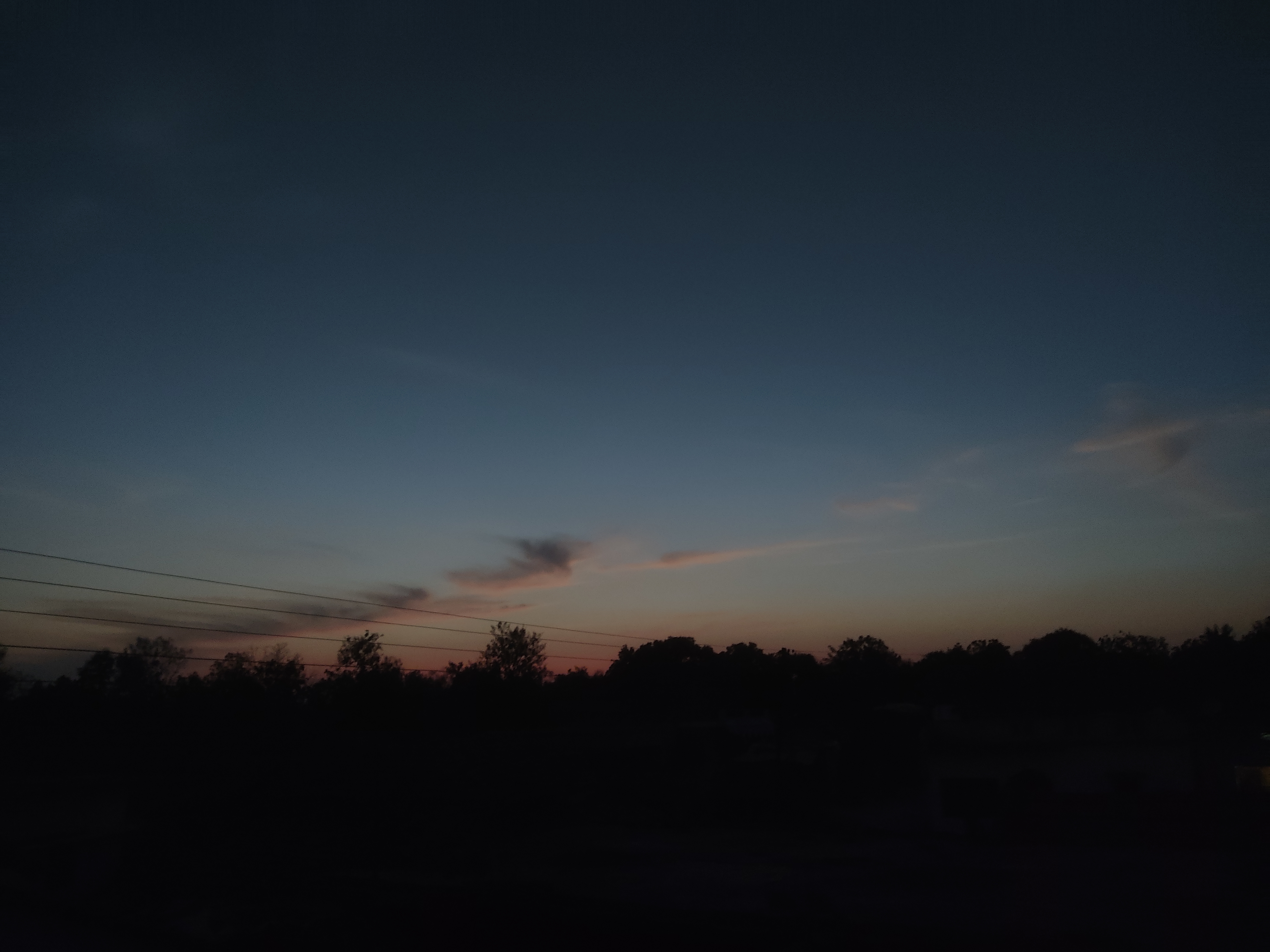
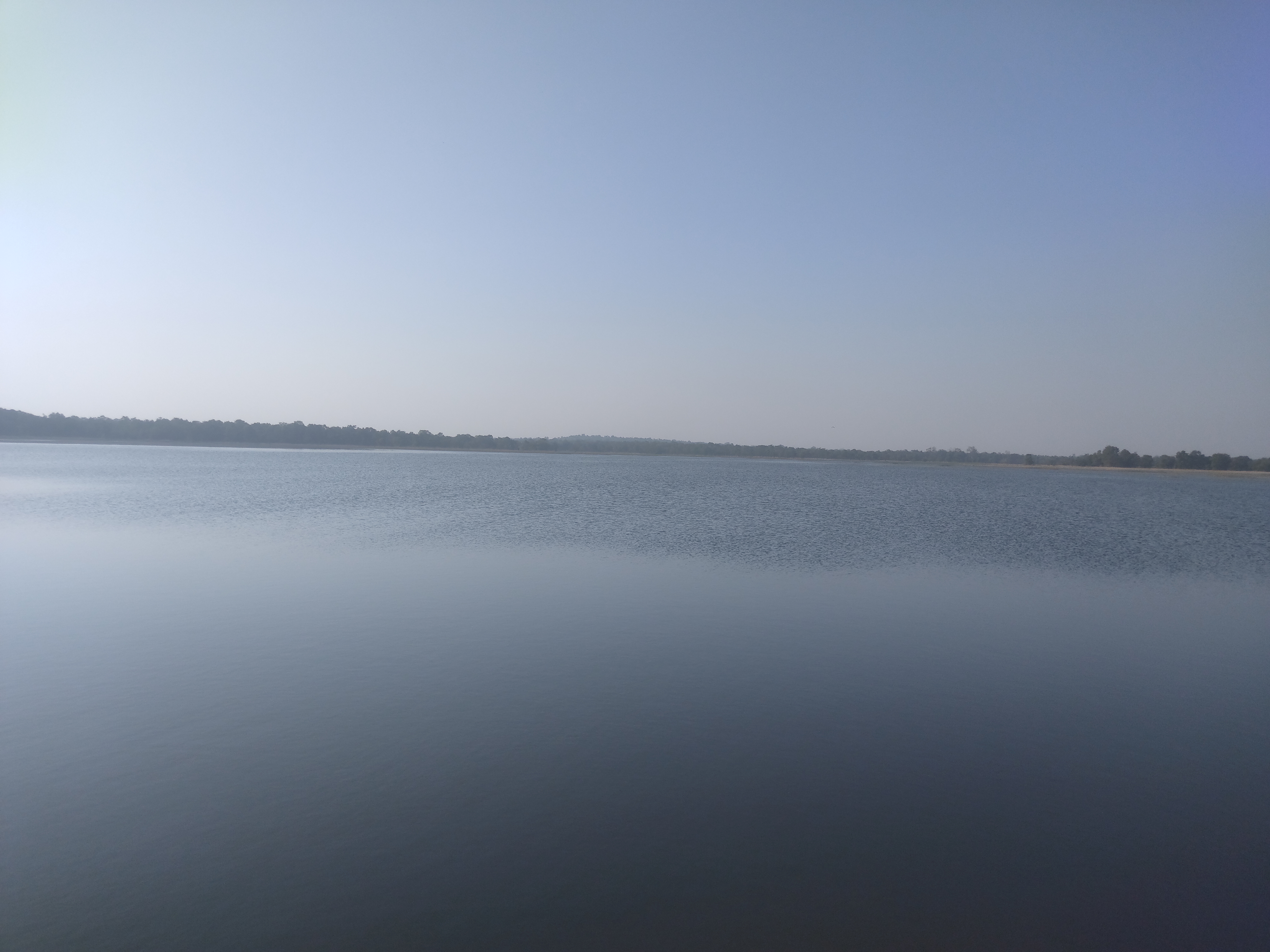
- Sunset at Shivnala Shivnala Lake
- Nickname: (Marathi: गोंडी-शिवनाळा)
- Location in Maharashtra, India Shivnala (Gondi) (India)
- Coordinates: 20.6999004°N 79.6968340°E
- Country: India
- State: Maharashtra
- Region: Vidharba
- District: Bhandara
- Tahsil: Pauni

Government
  - Type: Gram Panchayat
  - Body: Sedi/Somanala Grampanchayat

Area
  - Total: 93.35 ha (230.7 acres)
  - Land: 49 ha (120 acres)
- Elevation: 242 m (794 ft)

Population (2011)
  - Total: 225
  - Density: 460/km^{2} (1,200/sq mi)
- Demonym: Shivnalawashi

Languages
  - Official: Marathi
  - Sex ratio: 1,045

Demographics
  - Literacy rate: 72.45 %
- Time zone: UTC+5:30 (IST)
- PIN: 441910
- Telephone code: +91-7185
- Vehicle registration: MH-36

Shivnala (Gondi) is a small village of Pauni Taluka in Bhandara district of Maharashtra, India. As 100% of the population of this village belongs to the tribal community, this village is also called as Gondi-Shivnala.

== Demographics ==
=== Population ===
As per the Population Census 2011, there are a total of 65 families residing in the village Shivnala (Gondi). The total population of Junona is 225 out of which 115 are males and 115 are females thus the Average Sex Ratio of Shivnala (Gondi) is 1,045.

The population of Children of age 0–6 years in Shivnala (Gondi) village is 29 which is 13% of the total population. There are 13 male children and 16 female children between the age 0–6 years. Thus as per the Census 2011 the Child Sex Ratio of Shivnala (Gondi) is 1,231 which is greater than Average Sex Ratio (1,045) of Shivnala (Gondi) village.

As per the Census 2011, the literacy rate of Shivnala (Gondi) is 72.4%. Thus Shivnala (Gondi) village has a lower literacy rate compared to 75% of Bhandara district. The male literacy rate is 84.54% and the female literacy rate is 60.61% in Shivnala (Gondi) village.

As per constitution of India and Panchyati Raaj Act (Amendment 1998), Shivnala (Gondi) village is administrated by Sarpanch (Head of Village) who is elected representative of the village.
