= Adyar, Bhandara =

Adyal
- Village
- Interactive map of Adyal
- Coordinates: 20.9431968°N 79.7008109°E
- Country: India
- State: Maharashtra
- Region: Vidharba
- District: Bhandara
- Taluka: Pauni

Government
  - Type: Grampanchayat
  - Body: Adyal Grampanchayat
- Elevation: 258 m (846 ft)

Population (2011)
  - Total: 8,847
- Demonym: Adyalwasi

Languages
  - Official: Marathi
  - Additional Official: English
- Time zone: UTC+5:30 (IST)
- PIN: 441903
- Telephone code: +917185
- Vehicle registration: MH-36

Adyar or Adyal is a village of Pauni Taluka in Bhandara district in the Indian state of Maharashtra. It is connected with National Highway NH 247.

Its Coordinates are: 20.9431968 N 79.7008109 E . and is located on Maharashtra State roadway between Pauni and Bhandara City.

Before the delimitation of constituency in 2008, Adyar was constituency number 144 of Maharashtra Legislative Assembly between 1977 and 2004.

== Demographics ==
=== Population ===
Adyal has total 2166 families residing. The Adyal village has population of 8847 of which 4336 are males while 4511 are females as per Population Census 2011. It has population of children with age 0-6 is 894 which makes up 10.11% of total population of village. Average Sex Ratio of Adyal village is 1040 which is higher than Maharashtra state average of 929. Child Sex Ratio for the Adyal as per census is 1004, higher than Maharashtra average of 894. In 2011, literacy rate of Adyal village was 86.78% compared to 82.34% of Maharashtra. In Adyal Male literacy stands at 94.50% while female literacy rate was 79.40%.

=== Language and Culture ===
Zadiboli dialect of Marathi is the most prominent in a village. Hindi is second largest spoken language in Adyal.

=== Religion ===
All religions Muslim, Hindu, Sikh, budhha, panjabi, gujrati,
