= Bela, Bhandara =

Bela
- Census Town
- Interactive map of Bela
- Coordinates: 21.1520781°N 79.6136371°E
- Country: India
- State: Maharashtra
- Region: Vidharba
- District: Bhandara
- Taluka: Bhandara

Government
  - Type: Gram Panchayat
  - Body: Bela Grampanchayat

Area
  - Total: 5.52 km^{2} (2.13 sq mi)

Population (2011)
  - Total: 5,914
  - Density: 1,070/km^{2} (2,770/sq mi)
- Demonym: Belawasi

Languages
  - Official: Marathi
- Time zone: UTC+5:30 (IST)
- PIN: 441906
- Telephone code: +917184
- Vehicle registration: MH-36

Bela is the census town in Bhandara Taluka of Bhandara district of Maharashtra, India.
