= Sangadi =

- Village
- Sangadi Location in Sakoli Taluka
- Coordinates: 20°57′57″N 79°58′54″E
- Country: India
- State: Maharashtra
- Region: Vidarbha
- District: Bhandara
- Taluka: Sakoli

Government
  - Type: Gram Panchayat
  - Body: Sangadi Grampanchayat
- Elevation: 250 m (820 ft)

Population (2011)
  - Total: 6,823
- Demonym: Sangadiwasi

Languages
  - Official: Marathi
  - Additional Official: English
- Time zone: UTC+5:30 (IST)
- PIN: 441802
- Telephone code: +917186
- Vehicle registration: MH- 36

Sangadi is a large village of Sakoli Taluka in Bhandara district of Maharashtra, India. It is situated along National Highway NH-353C.
