= Koka Wildlife Sanctuary =

- IUCN category IV (habitat/species management area)
- Location within Maharashtra Location within India
- Interactive map of Koka Wildlife Sanctuary
- Location: Bhandara District, Maharashtra, India
- Nearest city: Nagpur and Bhandara
- Coordinates: 21°12′24.7″N 79°48′22.8″E
- Area: 92.34 km^{2} (35.65 sq mi)
- Established: 2013
- Governing body: Maharashtra State Forest Department

The Koka Wildlife Sanctuary is located in Bhandara District, near Bhandara Town of Maharashtra state. The sanctuary is spread over an area of 92.34 square kilometres. This sanctuary is a part of Nawegaon nagzira Tiger Reserve.

== Location ==
The sanctuary is located 20 km east of Bhandara town. The nearest rail and airport head is Nagpur. Regular buses at an interval of 30 minutes are available from Bhandara Bus Stand from 5:00 am to 8:00 pm. The sanctuary is open for visitors from sunrise to sunset. There are many hotels and resorts located near Bhandara town.

== About ==
The trees in the forest are 100 year old. Migratory birds from Siberia visit the lake inside the sanctuary during winter season. There is an abundant population of Tigers, leopards, Sloth bears, gaurs, Chital, Sambar deer and wild dogs in the sanctuary. There is no village inside Koka sanctuary. The entire area was declared as reserved forest in 1879; hence, no rights of any individual exists in the sanctuary. The reserve was declared a wildlife sanctuary in 2013.

== Gallery ==
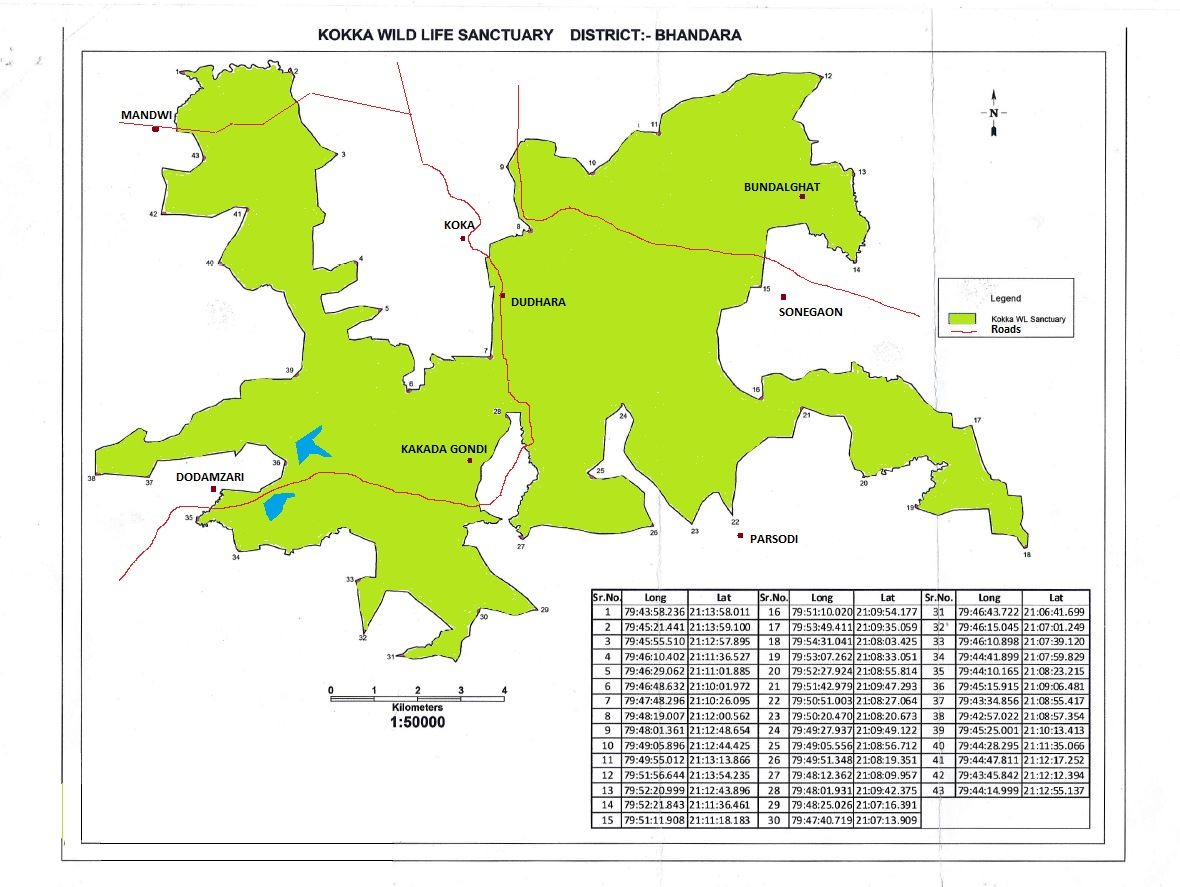
Map of Koka WL Sanctuary
