= Mohadi =

- Town
- Interactive map of Mohadi
- Coordinates: 21°18′30″N 79°40′30″E
- Country: India
- State: Maharashtra
- Region: Vidarbha
- District: Bhandara
- Taluka: Mohadi

Government
  - Type: Nagar panchayat
  - Body: Mohadi Nagar panchayat

Area
  - Total: 3 km^{2} (1.2 sq mi)

Population (2011)
  - Total: 9,635
  - Density: 3,200/km^{2} (8,300/sq mi)

Languages
  - Official: Marathi
- Time zone: UTC+5:30 (IST)
- PIN: 441909
- Telephone code: 07197
- Vehicle registration: MH-36
- Nearest city: Bhandara, Tumsar, Nagpur
- Sex ratio: 975:1000 ♂/♀
- Literacy: 85%
- Lok Sabha constituency: Bhandara-Gondiya (Lok Sabha constituency)
- Vidhan Sabha constituency: Tumsar Assembly region

Mohadi is a town and headquarters of Mohadi taluka in Bhandara district in the state of Maharashtra, India. It is located on newly declared National Highway NH 543K which connects cities of Bhandara and Balaghat in Maharashtra and Madhya Pradesh respectively.

Mohadi was created as Town council (Nagar panchayat) by amalgamation of Mohadi, Wadegaon and Kalamna villages in 2015.

There is the temple of Goddess Chandeshwari, which is a famous Hindu temple. This temple is about 350 years old. Both Nawratri festivals of the year are celebrated here. Lakhs of pilgrims visit the temple during Navaratri. The castes found in the Mohadi is Halba/Haldi, Teli, Kunbi and scheduled caste people, and very less proportion of Muslim. The language spoken is Marathi.

There are three junior colleges in Mohadi; Zilla Parishad Science and Art, Sulochana Devi Pardhi Science and Art, and Saraswati Art. There are three primary schools; Buniyadi Prathmik Shala, Anand Prathmic Shala and Kanya Prathmik Shala. There is civil and criminal court in Mohadi as it is taluka of Bhandara district. The colony area is known as civil line which is behind the Mohadi tehsil office. The administration of the town is handled by Nagar Panchayat. The main crop is paddy (rice) in the tehsil and it is coming as a good emerging town on Nagpur Tiroda-Gondia main road. Nearest railway station for this is Bhandara Road; also called as Warthi; its about 10 km from the town. The nearest airport is Nagpur airport which is about 90 km away. And it is well connected by roads too.

The town is triangular in shape and all the three sides are covered by rivers.

== See also ==
- Andhalgaon
- Warthi
- Kardi
- Knadri
- Shioni
