= State Highway 249 (Maharashtra) =

Road in Maharashtra, India

State Highway 249

Route information
- Maintained by MSRDC
- Length: 196 km (122 mi)

Major junctions
- West end: Katol, Nagpur
- East end: Gondia, Gondia District

Location
- Country: India
- State: Maharashtra
- Districts: Nagpur, Bhandara District, and Gondia District
- Primary destinations: Katol, Savner, Ramtek, Tumsar, Tirora, Gondia.

Highway system
- Roads in India; Expressways; National; State; Asian; State Highways in Maharashtra

Maharashtra State Highway 249 Also SH 249 is a state highway in Nagpur, Bhandara, and Gondia Districts in the state of Maharashtra. This state highway touches Katol, Savner, Parseoni, Ramtek, Tumsar, Tirora and Gondia.

== State Highway ==
- State Highway 354 (Maharashtra)
- State Highway 366 (Maharashtra)
- State Highway 275 (Maharashtra)

== Summary ==
This road is one of the important road in Nagpur District providing connectivity with two National Highway National Highway 7 (India, old numbering) and NH 69. This is also providing connectivity with Gondia city with Nagpur and passing through Tumsar and Tiroda. Adani Power Plant near Tiroda is also on this highway.

== Major junctions ==
This highway started from the intersection at Savner city with NH 69 and with National Highway 7 (India, old numbering) at Ambadi Village and Tumsar town in Nagpur District.

== Connections ==
Many villages, cities and towns in different districts are connecting by this state highway.

- Katol
- Savner
- Parseoni
- Ramtek
- Tumsar
- Tirora and
- Gondia.

== See also ==
- List of state highways in Maharashtra
