= Junona =

Village in Maharashtra, India

- Village
- Location in Maharashtra, India Junona (India)
- Coordinates: 20.7922933°N 79.6660636°E
- Country: India
- State: Maharashtra
- Region: Vidharba
- District: Bhandara
- Tahsil: Pauni

Government
  - Type: Gram Panchayat
  - Body: Junona Gram Panchayat

Area
  - Total: 427.09 ha (1,055.4 acres)
  - Land: 317.95 ha (785.7 acres)
- Elevation: 262 m (860 ft)

Population (2011)
  - Total: 1,243
  - Density: 291.04/km^{2} (753.8/sq mi)
- Demonym: Junonawashi

Languages
  - Official: Marathi

Demographics
  - Literacy rate: 80.49%
- Time zone: UTC+5:30 (IST)
- PIN: 441910
- Area code: +91-7185
- Vehicle registration: MH-36

Junona is a village located in Pauni Taluka of Bhandara district in Maharashtra, India

== Demographics ==
=== Population ===
As per the Population Census 2011, there are a total of 279 families residing in the village Junona. The total population of Junona is 1,243 out of which 635 are males and 608 are females thus the Average Sex Ratio of Junona is 957.

The population of Children of age 0–6 years in Junona village is 131 which is 11% of the total population. There are 69 male children and 62 female children between the age 0–6 years. Thus as per the Census 2011 the Child Sex Ratio of Junona is 899 which is less than Average Sex Ratio (957) of Junona village.

As per the Census 2011, the literacy rate of Junona is 80.5%. Thus Junona village has a higher literacy rate compared to 75% of Bhandara district. The male literacy rate is 86.93% and the female literacy rate is 73.81% in Junona village.
