= Mauda =

- town
- Location in Maharashtra, India
- Coordinates: 21.15°N 79.40°E
- Country: India
- State: Maharashtra
- District: Nagpur

Area
  - Total: 61,293.17 ha (151,458.7 acres)

Population (2001)
  - Total: 32,641
  - Density: 53.254/km^{2} (137.93/sq mi)

Languages
  - Official: Marathi
- Time zone: UTC+5:30 (IST)
- Postal Code: 441104
- Telephone code: +91-07115
- Vehicle registration: MH-40
- Website: nagpur.gov.in/mauda

Mouda, (or Mauda) is a town and a Tehsil in the Ramtek subdivision of the Nagpur district in the Nagpur Revenue Division. It is situated in the Berar region in the state of Maharashtra, India. The total area covered under this Tehsil is around 61,293.17 hectares. The population of this tehsil is around 37,554 (19,566 male, 17,978 female)according to the 1991 census. The nearest city to Mouda is Nagpur, which is 38 km away. now it is also a part of Nagpur metropolitan region. The total number of villages in this tehsil is 41. Mouda is famous for its fertile agricultural land. Therefore, the main occupation is farming. The average rainfall here is estimated to be around 1223.3mm. It is located on the banks of the Kanhan River and near National Highway 6.

== Villages ==
- Adasa
- Adegaon
- Aisamba
- Ajangaon
- Aroli
- Ashti
- Babadeo
- Barshi
- Batnor
- Berdipar
- Bhamawada
- Bhandewadi
- Bhendala
- Bhobhara(sundargaon)
- Bhowari
- Borgaon
- Borgaon(rithi)
- Bori (ghiwari)
- Chacher
- Charbha
- Chehadi
- Chicholi
- Chikhalabodi
- Chirwha
- Dahali
- Dahegaon
- Deomundhari
- Dhamangaon
- Dhani
- Dhanla
- Dhanoli
- Dharmapuri
- Dholmara
- Dudhala
- Gangner
- Ghotmundhari
- Gowari
- Hingana
- Hiwara
- Hiwara
- Ijani
- Indora
- Indori(Rithi)
- Isapur
- Kargaon(rithi)
- Kathalabodi
- Khandala
- Khandala
- Khandala Gujar
- Khaparkheda
- Khaparkheda (Gadi Patil Teli)
- Khaparkheda (Kirad)
- Kharda
- Khat
- Khidki
- Khopadi
- Kirnapur
- Kodamendhi
- Kopara
- Korad
- Kotgaon
- Kumbhapur
- Kumbhari
- Lapaka
- Mahadula
- Mahalgaon
- Mangli (Chande)
- Mangli(Gosai)
- Mangli(Teli)
- Marodi
- Mathani
- Metshivadouli
- Mohadi
- Mohkhedi
- Morgaon
- Murmadi
- Nanadevi
- Nandapuri
- Nandgaon
- Narsala
- Nawargaon
- Nawegaon
- Nawegaon
- Nerla
- Niharwani
- Nimkheda
- Nisatkheda
- Panjara
- Panmara
- Pardi Kh
- Pardikala
- Pawaddauna
- Pimpalgaon
- Pipari
- Rahadi
- Rajoli
- Rewaral
- Salwa
- Sawagi
- Sawargaon
- Shiwani
- Shrikhanda
- Sigori
- Singori
- Sirsoli
- Sukali
- Sukli
- Tanda
- Tarodi
- Tarsa
- Tondli (Burj)
- Tondli Rithi
- Tuman
- Wadhana
- Wagbodi
- Wagholi (Rithi)
- Wakeshwar
- Wanjra
- Waygaon
- Wirshi
- Zullar
