= Bhandara Road railway station =

Railway station in Maharashtra, India

Bhandara Road

General information
- Location: Warthi, Bhandara district, Maharashtra; India
- Coordinates: 21°14′18″N 79°38′45″E
- Elevation: 265 metres (869 ft)
- System: Express train and Passenger train Station
- Owner: Indian Railways
- Operator: South East Central Railway zone
- Lines: Bilaspur–Nagpur section Howrah–Nagpur–Mumbai line
- Platforms: 3
- Tracks: Broad gauge 1,676 mm (5 ft 6 in)

Construction
- Structure type: At ground
- Parking: Available
- Cycle facilities: Available

Other information
- Status: Functioning
- Station code: BRD
- Zone(s): South East Central Railway zone
- Division(s): Nagpur

History
- Opened: 1888
- Electrified: 1990–91, 1991–92

Passengers
- 16,000

Services
Preceding station	Indian Railways	Following station
Koka towards ?	South East Central Railway zone Bilaspur–Nagpur section of Howrah–Nagpur–Mumbai line	Khat towards ?
Location
- Location within India Location within Maharashtra

Bhandara Road railway station (Marathi: भंडारा रोड रेल्वे स्थानक) serves Bhandara City and surrounding areas in Bhandara district in Maharashtra, India.

== Electrification ==
The entire main line was electrified in stages. The Gondia–Bhandara Road section in 1990–91 and Bhandara Road–Tharsa section in 1991–92.
