= Andhalgaon =

- Village
- Interactive map of Andhalgaon
- Coordinates: 21.356060°N 79.619118°E
- Country: India
- State: Maharashtra
- Region: Vidharba
- District: Bhandara
- Taluka: Mohadi

Government
  - Type: Gram Panchayat
  - Body: Andhalgaon Grampanchayat
- Elevation: 273 m (896 ft)

Population (2011)
  - Total: 6,309
- Demonym: Andhalgaonwasi

Languages
  - Official: Marathi
  - Additional Official: English
- Time zone: UTC+5:30 (IST)
- PIN: 441914
- Telephone code: +917197
- Vehicle registration: MH-36

Andhalgaon is the village in Mohadi Taluka of Bhandara District of Maharashtra, India. According to the 2011 census it has a population of 6309 living in 1425 households.

This village is 9 km away from tehsil place and 29 km from Bhandara district. In the center of village one Durga mata mandir and just back side the police station is there. In near this Durga mata mandir the "Bhagwat Saptah" celebrated by the village people. This village is main market for nearer villagers. This village is famous for silk. The village is famous for Vidarbha karavati tassar silk saree, after farming silk business is the second largest business in the village. People from different parts of India come to visit this silk business and buying silk stuff here. The early start to enter into village the school Zilla Parishd High School, Junior College & Jijamata Convent situated. In school there are Mahatma Gandhi statue and beautiful garden. This is one of the most beautiful school in the district. It is a politically strong village in the district. There are groups of communities like Teli, Kunbi, koshti, Buddhist & less proportion of Muslims. The majors peoples having surname are Karemore, Burade, Sonkusare, Patil, Nimje, Nipane, Ninave, Selokar, Badwaik & so on. One day, it will be prime developed village in the district.
