= Kurza =

Kurza may refer to:

- Kurza, India
- Kurza, Iran
- Kurza, Poland
- Kurza, Hebron
