= Niharwani =

Village in Maharashtra

- Village
- Location in Maharashtra, India Niharwani (India)
- Coordinates: 21.16676°N 79.54569°E
- Country: India
- State: Maharashtra
- Region: Vidarbha
- District: Nagpur

Government
  - Type: Gram Panchayat
  - Body: Gat Grampanchayat Niharwani

Languages
  - Official: Marathi
- Time zone: UTC+5:30 (IST)
- PIN: 441104
- Telephone code: +917115
- Vehicle registration: MH-40
- Nearest city: Bhandara
- Lok Sabha constituency: Ramtek Lok Sabha constituency
- Vidhan Sabha constituency: Kamthi (Vidhan Sabha constituency)

Niharwani is a village in Mauda Taluka of Nagpur District of Maharashtra, India. According to the 2011 census it has a population of 1189 living in 1270 households.
