= Sawari Jawaharnagar =

- Census Town
- Location in Maharashtra, India
- Coordinates: 21.1136°N 79.5509°E
- Country: India
- State: Maharashtra
- District: Bhandara

Population (2001)
  - Total: 11,775

Languages
  - Official: Marathi
- Time zone: UTC+5:30 (IST)
- PIN: 441906
- Vehicle registration: MH-36

Sawari Jawaharnagar is a census town in Bhandara district in the Indian state of Maharashtra.

== Demographics ==
As of 2001 India census, Sawari Jawharnagar had a population of 11,965. Males constitute 52% of the population and females 48%. Sawari Jawharnagar has an average literacy rate of 84%, higher than the national average of 59.5%: male literacy is 89%, and female literacy is 78%. In Sawari Jawharnagar, 8% of the population is under 6 years of age.

| Year | Male | Female | Total Population | Change | Religion (%) | | | | | | | |
| Year | Male | Female | Total Population | Change | Hindu | Muslim | Christian | Sikhs | Buddhist | Jain | Other religions and persuasions | Religion not stated |
|---|---|---|---|---|---|---|---|---|---|---|---|---|
| 2001 | 6251 | 5714 | 11965 | - | 73.673 | 2.474 | 1.538 | 0.719 | 21.446 | 0.059 | 0.092 | 0.000 |
| 2011 | 4442 | 4328 | 8770 | -0.267 | 65.211 | 2.794 | 1.072 | 0.502 | 29.943 | 0.182 | 0.114 | 0.182 |
