= Bhandara Municipal Council =

Bhandara Municipal Council Bhandara Municipality Class 1

Type
- Type: Unicameral

History
- Founded: 1867

Structure
- Seats: 33
- Political groups: Government BJP: 15 seats Independent: 3 seats Opposition NCP: 11 seats INC: 3 seats Independent: 1 seat

Elections
- Voting system: First pass the post
- Last election: 18 December 2016
- Next election: TBD

Meeting place
- Municipal Council Office, Gandhi Square, Bhandara.

Website
- http://www.bhandaranagarpalika.com

Bhandara Municipal Council is Municipality Bhandara City in Bhandara district of Maharashtra, India.Arjuni Municipal Council

== History ==
In a Bhandara district, Bhandara Municipal Council was established along with Pauni and Tumsar municipalities by the Government of Central Provinces in the year of 1867 during British Era.

=== Income and expenditure ===
The average municipal income during the decade ending 1901 was Rs. 35,000. In 1904–05 the income was Rs. 32,000, being principally derived from octroi and a water-rate. In 1968–69 the total municipal income derived from various sources, excluding a sum of Rs. 1,14,083 as income derived from extraordinary and debt heads, amounted to Rs. 12,36,604. The expenditure during the same year, excluding a sum of Rs. 1,44,786 incurred on account of extraordinary and debt heads, stood at Rs. 11,93,524. The principal items of expenditure were general administration and collection charges, and public health, safety, convenience and instruction.

Medical Aid, Drainage and Water Supply: A Government conducted General Hospital with a capacity of 99 beds provides medical aid. An x-ray machine and two operation theaters for major and minor operations are also provided. For T. B. patients a special ward of 10 beds is attached. The district as a whole and Sakoli and Gondia tah.sils in particular has a large number of leprosy patients. With a view to checking this disease a leprosy subsidiary centre has been opened at Bhandara too. Bhandara has a maternity home and an ayurvedic dispensary also. Under the National Malaria Control Programme D. D. T. spraying is done periodically. The veterinary dispensary of the town with an artificial insemination centre attached to it is conducted by the municipality. The drainage system consists of stone lined surface drains kept in order by the sanitary staff. "The water supply of the town is obtained from the Wainganga river. Three filtration wells have been sunk in the bed of the river and water is carried from them to a service reservoir near the jail, from which it is distributed over the town in pipes. The works were opened in 1900, the cost of the scheme being Rs. 1.84 lakhs and the annual maintenance charges Rs. 6,000. A large proportion of the cost was raised by local subscriptions, the zamindar of Kamtha, Indraraj Bhau, contributing Rs. 55,000 [Central Provinces District Gazetteers, Bhandara District, 1908 ed., p. 192.]. Although the water supply scheme was subsequently expended, the supply falls far short of the demand. A new scheme, to be undertaken on the same river, has therefore been submitted for Government approval. It is estimated to cost Rs. 11 lakhs."

=== Education ===
Primary education is looked after by the municipality. It is compulsory. There are four balak mandirs and 14 primary schools. The town has seven secondary school's, of which two are maintained by Government and one by the Municipality. Of the high schools, the Manro High School, named after the then Director of Public Instruction, was opened in 1904 by Mr. Joshi, a well known citizen of the town. The number of colleges is three.

On the banks of the Wainganga river a cremation ground is maintained by the municipality; besides there are two burial grounds.

== Municipal Council election ==
=== Electoral performance 2016 ===
S.No.	Party name	Party flag or symbol	Number of Corporators
01	Bharatiya Janata Party (BJP)		15
02	Indian National Congress (INC)		3
03	Nationalist Congress Party (NCP)		11
04	Independents		4

=== Electoral performance 2011 ===
S.No.	Party name	Alliance	Party flag or symbol	Number of Corporators
01	Shiv Sena (SS)	NDA		2
02	Bharatiya Janata Party (BJP)	NDA		6
03	Indian National Congress (INC)	UPA		3
04	Nationalist Congress Party (NCP)	UPA		16
05	Communist Party of India (CPI)			1
06	Independents			4
