= Lakhani, Maharashtra =

Lakhani
- Town
- Interactive map of Lakhani
- Coordinates: 21°04′13″N 79°49′40″E
- Country: India
- State: Maharashtra
- Region: Vidarbha
- District: Bhandara
- Taluka: Lakhani

Government
  - Type: Nagar panchayat
  - Body: Lakhani Nagar Panchayat
- Elevation: 260 m (850 ft)

Population (2011)
  - Total: 12,636
- Demonym: Lakhaniwasi

Languages
  - Official: Marathi
  - Additional Official: English
- Time zone: UTC+5:30 (IST)
- PIN: 441804
- Telephone code: +917186
- Vehicle registration: MH- 36

Lakhani is a town and headquarter of Lakhani Taluka, Bhandara District, Maharashtra, India. It has the largest flyover in Bhandara district at 3.50 km. Lakhani is 21.3 km from the district's main city Bhandara and 837 km from the state capital of Mumbai. Its population is about 15,000.
