= Tumsar Municipal Council =

Type
- Type: Unicameral

History
- Founded: 1867

Leadership
- President: Er.Sagar Vidya Manohar Gabhane, [[Independent] since 2 November 2025
- Vice-president: Er. Sachin Babulal Bopache, BJP since 16 January 2026

Structure
- Seats: 25
- Political groups: Government BJP: 10 seats; Opposition; INC: 3 seats NCP: 10 seats Shiv Sena Shinde Gat: 1 seats Independent: 1 seat

Elections
- Voting system: First pass the post
- Last election: 2 November2025
- Next election: TBD

In 2025 election new President Er. Sagar Manohar Gabhane

Tumsar Municipal Council is a municipal local body administrating Tumsar City in Bhandara district of Maharashtra, India.

In December 2025, Tumsar ward delivered a major upset by electing an independent candidate in the Municipal Council election. NCP rebel Sagar Gabhane won the seat.

In March 2026, a controversy arose after the selection of the members by the mayor.

== See also ==
- Bhandara Municipal Council
