= Dighori =

- Village
- Interactive map of Dighori
- Coordinates: 20.8862°N 79.9342°E
- Country: India
- State: Maharashtra
- Region: Vidarbha
- District: Bhandara
- Taluka: Lakhandur

Government
  - Type: Gram Panchayat

Languages
  - Official: Marathi
- Time zone: UTC+5:30 (IST)
- PIN: 441805
- Telephone code: +917181
- Vehicle registration: MH-36
- Nearest city: Lakhandur
- Lok Sabha constituency: Bhandara-Gondiya (Lok Sabha constituency)
- Vidhan Sabha constituency: Sakoli (Vidhan Sabha constituency)

Dighori is a village in the Lakhandur Taluka of Bhandara District in Maharashtra, India. Dighori Mothi is a village located in the Lakhandur Taluka of Bhandara District in Maharashtra, India. The village falls under the jurisdiction of the Dighori Gram Panchayat.

== Geography ==
Dighori Mothi covers a total area of approximately 1,334.6 hectares (13.34 km^{2}). The village is located at a latitude of 20.8869910005 and a longitude of 79.9308426475.

== Demographics ==
As per the 2011 Census of India, Dighori Mothi has a total population of 5,728 individuals, with an almost equal gender distribution:

- Male Population: 2,861
- Female Population: 2,867
- Sex Ratio: Approximately 100 females for every 100 males
- Literacy Rate: 72.1%

== Administration ==
Dighori Mothi is governed by the Dighori Gram Panchayat. The administrative details are as follows:

- Taluka: Lakhandur
- District: Bhandara
- Pincode: 441805

== Economy ==
The village's economy is primarily driven by agriculture, covering approximately 1,625 acres of farmland. Major crops is rice, corn, and vegetables. Additionally, self-help groups (SHGs) and small-scale businesses contribute to economic activities.

== Educational Facilities ==
Dighori Mothi hosts several educational institutions, including:

- Pre-primary Schools: 6 government schools
- Primary Schools: 3 government schools
- Middle Schools: 2 government and 1 private school
- Secondary Schools: 2 government schools
- Senior Secondary Schools: 2 government schools
- Degree Colleges: 1 private arts and science colleges

== Healthcare Facilities ==
The village has various healthcare services, including:

- A Primary Health Centre with 2 doctors and 10 paramedical staff
- A Veterinary Hospital

== Transportation and Connectivity ==
Dighori Mothi is connected via public and private bus services. The nearest railway station is over 18 kilometers away. Postal services are provided through the Dighori Sub Office with the PIN code 441805.
