= Khairlanji massacre =

Kherlanji Dalit massacre

Coordinates: 21°22′10″N 79°34′16″E

- Date: 29 September 2006
- Location: Kherlanji located in the Bhandara district
- Cause: Revenge, Casteism
- Deaths: 4
- Charges: Slaughtering

The Khairlanji massacre (or Kherlanji massacre) was the murder of four Scheduled Caste citizens by villagers of Khairlanji on 29 September 2006. The killings took place in the small Indian village of Khairlanji (Kherlanji), located in the Bhandara district of the state of Maharashtra.

== History ==
On 29 September 2006, four members of the Bhotmange family belonging to a Scheduled caste were murdered in a small village called Kherlanji in Maharashtra. Enraged by a police complaint lodged the previous day by Surekha Bhaiyyalal Bhotmange over a land dispute, the accused dragged out Surekha, two of her sons and a daughter, paraded them naked in the village and then hanged them to death. The accused were members of various backward castes. The criminal act was in fact carried out by assailants from the numerically dominant Kunbi caste(classified as Other Backward Classes) for "opposing" the requisition of their field to have a road built over it. Initial reports suggested that the women were gang-raped before being murdered. Though CBI investigations concluded that the women were not raped, serious doubt was cast on the reliability of these probes, amid allegations of bribery of doctors who performed the post-mortem, and of corruption.

There were allegations that the local police shielded the alleged perpetrators in the ongoing investigation. A government report on the killings, prepared by the social justice department and YASHADA —the state academy of developmental administration, has implicated top police officers, doctors and even a BJP member of the Legislative Assembly, Madhukar Kukade in an alleged coverup and hindering the investigations. Kukade has denied these charges, saying that he had not been in Kherlanji in months. However, the state Home Minister R. R. Patil admitted to initial lapses in police investigation and said that five policemen suspended in the investigation of the killings had been dismissed. In December 2006, CBI filed a charge-sheet against 11 persons on charges of murder, criminal conspiracy, unlawful assembly with deadly weapons and outraging the modesty of women. CBI also said that it will investigate the role of the 36 people in detention.

The media coverage of the incident was initially weak and omitted any mention of caste, but picked up momentum after the Dalit-led protests across Maharashtra grew stronger. An investigative feature article by Sabrina Buckwalter with the help of social activist Deelip Mhaske in The Times of India provided the first mainstream, in-depth coverage of the massacre.

In September 2008, six people were given the death sentence for the crime. However, on 14 July 2010, the Nagpur bench of the High Court commuted the death penalty awarded to the six convicted to a 25-year rigorous imprisonment jail sentence.

== Protests ==
Protests against the killings in the Kherlanji village took place in various parts of Maharashtra. On 19 November 2006, over 4,000 Scheduled Caste citizens gathered at the Azad maidan in Mumbai to protest against the Khairlanji incident. On 23 November 2006, several members of the Scheduled Caste community in the nearby district of Chandrapur staged a protest over the Khairlanji killings. The protesters allegedly turned violent and threw stones. The police baton-charged the protesters to control the situation. Scheduled Caste leaders, however, denied that they had caused any violence and claimed that they were "protesting in peace".

Maharashtra Chief Minister Vilasrao Deshmukh announced an ex-gratia payment of Rs 600,000 to the next of kin of the victims' family, and housing and job awards to the affected family members. He also assured that his government would give an additional Rs 200,000 to them from the Chief Minister's Relief Fund.

In November and December 2006, the desecration of an Ambedkar statue in Kanpur, Uttar Pradesh triggered off violent protests by Buddhists in Maharashtra. Several people, including the Maharashtra Chief Minister Vilasrao Deshmukh and the Mumbai Police Commissioner A N Roy remarked that the protests were fuelled by the Khairlanji killings.

== Court case ==
=== 2008 September Verdict by the Bhandara court ===
The verdict in the 2006 Khairlanji court case was announced on 15 September 2008. Bhandara Sessions court has held eight people guilty of murder and acquitted three.

List of people held guilty of murder:

- Gopal Sakru Binjewar
- Sakru Binjewar
- Shatrughna Dhande
- Vishwanath Dhande
- Prabhakar Mandlekar
- Jagdish Mandlekar
- Ramu Dhande
- Shishupal Dhande

List of acquitted people:

- Mahipal Dhande
- Dharmpal Dhande
- Purshottam Titirmare

The first ad hoc sessions judge, S S Dass, had heard the arguments of prosecution and defence on the quantum of punishment and had fixed 24 September for his pronouncement. Special public prosecutor Ujjwal Nikam had made a forceful plea for capital punishment to all the convicts. Defence lawyers Sudip Jaiswal and Neeraj Khandewale pleaded for leniency in view of the act committed in the heat of the moment and clean past record of the convicts.

On 24 September 2008, six people were awarded the death sentence, while two others were given life imprisonment. The ruling was appealed to the Nagpur division bench of the Bombay High Court where hearings began in April 2010. Justices A P Lawande and R C Chavan heard arguments in the case until 21 April 2010, at which point they announced the verdict would be announced on 15 June 2010. However, Justice Lawande on 15 June said the decision would be deferred until 14 July 2010 as Justice Chavan is posted in Bombay.

=== 2010 July verdict by the Bhandara court ===
On 14 July, the Nagpur bench of the High Court commuted the death penalty awarded to the six convicted to a 25-year rigorous imprisonment jail sentence. The two others who received life sentences received a similar sentence.

The ruling touched off statewide protests and re-kindled the fury of injustice felt by local Scheduled Caste organizations and the sole survivor, Bhaiyyalal Bhotmange. The court ruled that the murders resulted from an act of revenge and was not caste related.

Bhotmange was told that the CBI would appeal the commutation to the Supreme Court, however, after over two weeks of no action, Bhotmange announced he would appeal the decision himself.

An appeal against the judgment of the High Court is pending before the Hon'ble Supreme Court of India. It was last listed for hearing on 14 August 2015.

=== Death of Bhaiyyalal Bhotmange ===
The lone survivor of the 2006 Khairlanji Scheduled Caste family massacre, Bhaiyyalal Bhotmange died on 20 January 2017 due to heart attack. He was 62 years old.
