= Brass City (disambiguation) =

Brass City is the nickname of Waterbury, Connecticut, U.S.

Brass City may also refer to:

- Jamnagar, India
- Moradabad, India
- Bhandara, Maharashtra, India
