= Lakhandur =

- Town
- Interactive map of Lakhandur
- Coordinates: 20°45′0″N 79°53′0″E
- Country: India
- State: Maharashtra
- Region: Vidarbha
- District: Bhandara
- Taluka: Lakhandur

Government
  - Type: Nagar panchayat
  - Body: Lakhandur Nagar Panchayat
- Elevation: 229 m (751 ft)

Population (2011)
  - Total: 9,231
- Demonym: Lakhandurwasi

Languages
  - Official: Marathi
  - Additional Official: English
- Time zone: UTC+5:30 (IST)
- PIN: 441803
- Telephone code: +91
- Vehicle registration: MH- 36
- Lok Sabha constituency: Bhandara-Gondiya (Lok Sabha constituency)
- Vidhan Sabha constituency: Sakoli (Vidhan Sabha constituency)

Lakhandur is a City and headquarter of Lakhandur Taluka in Bhandara district of Maharashtra, India. It is connected with National Highway NH-353C.It was Vidhan Sabha Constituency till 2009. It is located in vidharbha region of Maharashtra.It is located on bank of chulbandh river.It is situated at a distance of 104 kilometers from Nagpur and 68 kilometers from Gadchiroli.

== Demographics ==
As at the 2011 census, the population was 9231; 4659 males and 4572 females, giving a sex ration of 981, higher than the state average of 929 . There were 1012 children aged 0–6 = 10.96% of the total population. The literacy rate was 84.46% (males 89.71% females 79.16%) higher than the state average of 82.34%.

== Educational facilities ==
- Dr. Babasaheb Ambedkar vidyalaya
- Shivaji vidyalaya
- Siddhartha Jr college
- Y. C. college
- Z. P. High School
- Government ITI college
- Gurudeo Manjula Mata Vidyalaya
