= Khat railway station =

Railway Station in Maharashtra, India

General information
- Location: Khat, Nagpur district, Maharashtra 441106; India
- Coordinates: 21.2425°N 79.5509°E
- Elevation: 286 metres (938 ft)
- System: Indian Railways station
- Owner: Indian Railways
- Operator: South East Central Railway zone
- Lines: Bilaspur–Nagpur section Howrah–Nagpur–Mumbai line
- Platforms: 2
- Tracks: Broad gauge 1,676 mm (5 ft 6 in)

Construction
- Structure type: At Ground
- Parking: Available
- Cycle facilities: Available

Other information
- Status: Functioning
- Station code: KHAT
- Zone(s): South East Central Railway zone
- Division(s): Nagpur

History
- Electrified: 1991–92

Services
Preceding station	Indian Railways	Following station
Bhandara Road towards ?	South East Central Railway zone Bilaspur–Nagpur section of Howrah–Nagpur–Mumbai line	Rewral towards ?
Location
- Location within India Location within Maharashtra

Khat railway station serves Khat and surrounding villages in Nagpur District of Maharashtra, India.
