= Kurza, India =

Village in Maharashtra

Kurza
- Village
- Interactive map of Kurza
- Coordinates: 20°51′13″N 79°37′48″E
- Country: India
- State: Maharashtra
- Region: Vidharba
- District: Bhandara
- Taluka: Pauni

Government
  - Type: Gram Panchayat
  - Body: Kurza Grampanchayat
- Elevation: 237 m (778 ft)

Population (2011)
  - Total: 2,052
- Demonym: Kurzawasi

Languages
  - Official: Marathi
  - Additional Official: English
- Time zone: UTC+5:30 (IST)
- PIN: 441903
- Telephone code: +917185
- Vehicle registration: MH-36

Kurza is a small village situated on the banks of the Wainganga River in Bhandara district, Maharashtra state, India. It is 5 km from Pauni. Educational facilities up to fourth standard ia available in ZP School and from fifth standard to tenth standard in Janata Highschool. One Primary Health Center is also available. Monday is a weekly Market Day. Temples of Hanuman, Baba Farid and Sati Benabai are very ancient. Every 3rd Year the villagers celebrate "Sati Benabai Jatra". The village is also known as "Benabai's Kurza". Janata high school kurza, is the only school here providing education to children in nearby villages from standard 5th to 10th (Semi English), it is provided with experienced teaching staff.

As of 2021, Shri Bawankar is the Head Master and is ensuring that he maintains the reputation of the school. He is active in the region as a social and educational figure, with prospects for a future political career. He has recently been awarded the "Rashtriya EKatmata Fellowship" award by the "Infotech Features Mumbai".

Pauni is a main market place for selling and buying goods, which is famous for temples and is a tourist place.
