= Tiroda Thermal Power Station =

Thermal power plant in Maharashtra, India

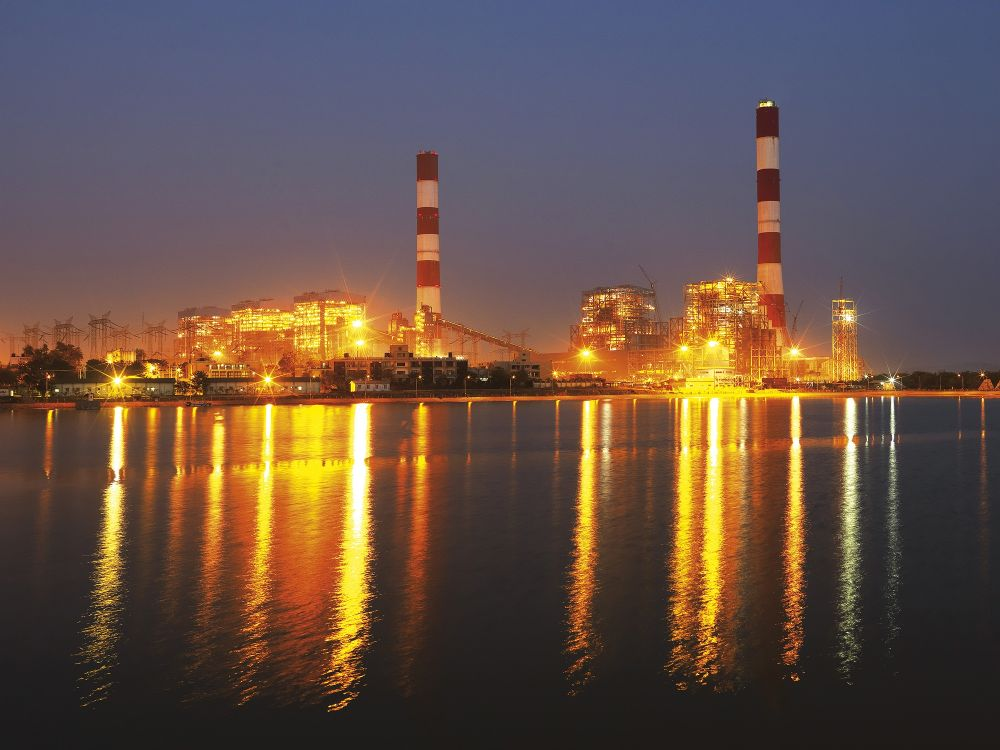
Tiroda Thermal Power Plant operated by Adani Power Maharashtra Limited.

Tiroda Thermal Power Station is a coal-based thermal power plant located near Tirora in Gondia district, Maharashtra. The power plant is operated by Adani Power.

== Capacity ==
The power station has a planned capacity of 3,300 MW (5x660 MW).

Stage	Unit number	Installed capacity (MW)	Date of commissioning	Status
1	1	660	2012 September	Running
1	2	660,	2013 March	Running
1	3	660	2013 June	Running
1	4	660	2014 April	Running
1	5	660	2014 October	Running
