= Mauda Super Thermal Power Station =

Building in India

- Country: India
- Location: Nagpur Maharashtra
- Coordinates: 21°10′47″N 79°23′50″E
- Status: Operational
- Construction began: 2009
- Commission date: Stage 1 in March 2013 and Stage 2 in April 2017
- Owner: NTPC

Thermal power station
- Primary fuel: Coal

Power generation
- Units operational: 2 X 500MW(Stage#1) and 2 X 600MW(Stage#2).
- Make and model: BHEL
- Nameplate capacity: 2,320 MW

Mauda Super Thermal Power Station or NTPC Mauda is located at Mauda a Tehsil in Ramtek subdivision of Nagpur district in Nagpur revenue Division in the Berar region in the state of Maharashtra, India. The power plant is one of the coal based power plants of National Thermal Power Corporation. 1000 MW Stage 1 was dedicated to nation by Prime Minister Narendra Modi on 21 August 2014.

Bharat Heavy Electricals Limited (BHEL) is the EPC contractor (EPCC) for the power project.

== Capacity ==
Stage	Unit Number	Installed Capacity (MW)	Date of Commissioning	Status
1st	1	500	March, 2013	Running
1st	2	500	April, 2013	Running
2nd	3	660	March, 2016	Running
2nd	4	660	March, 2017	Running
Total		2,320		

== Gallery ==
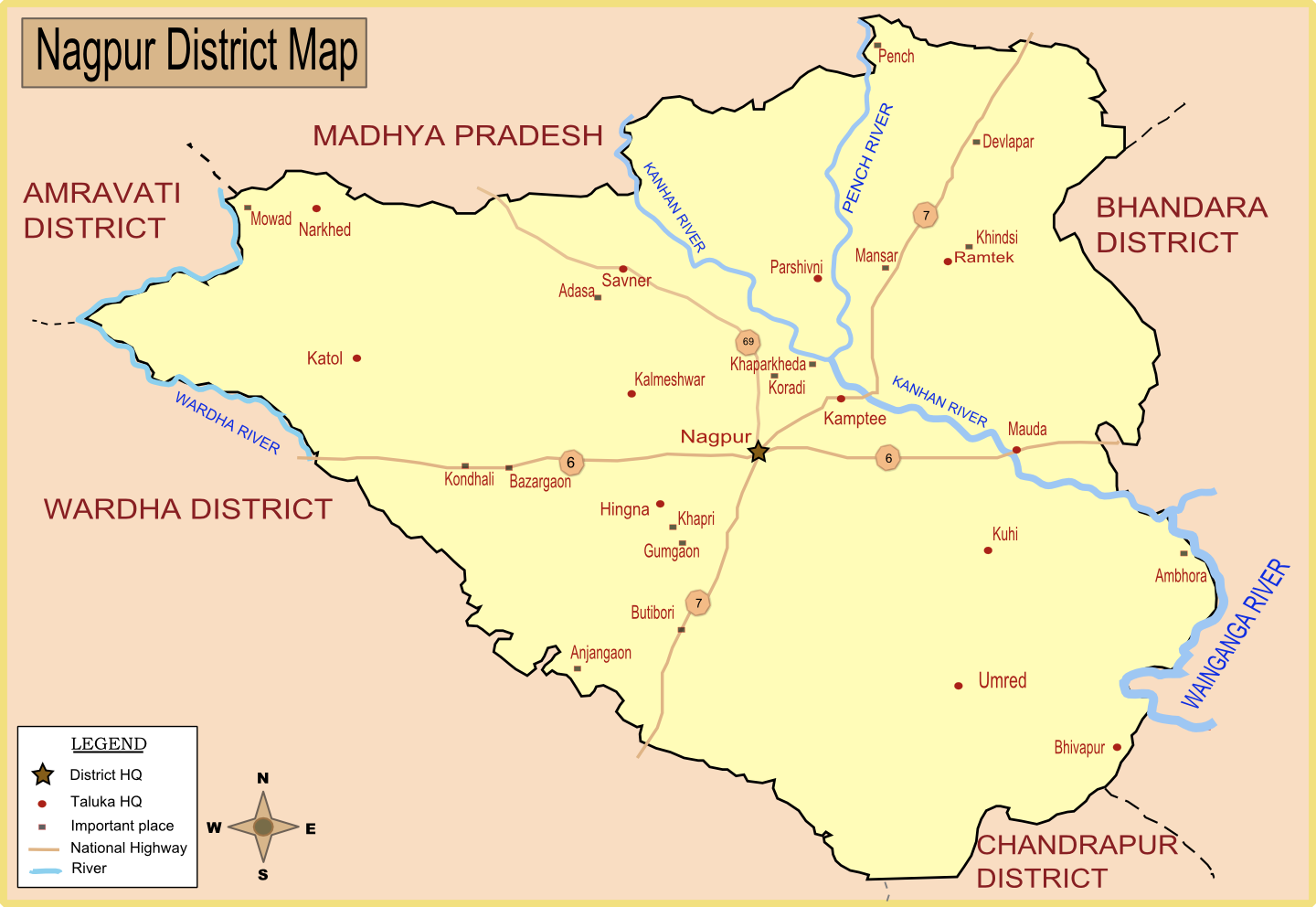
Map of Nagpur district with major towns (including Mouda) and rivers.
