= Ramtek Dam =

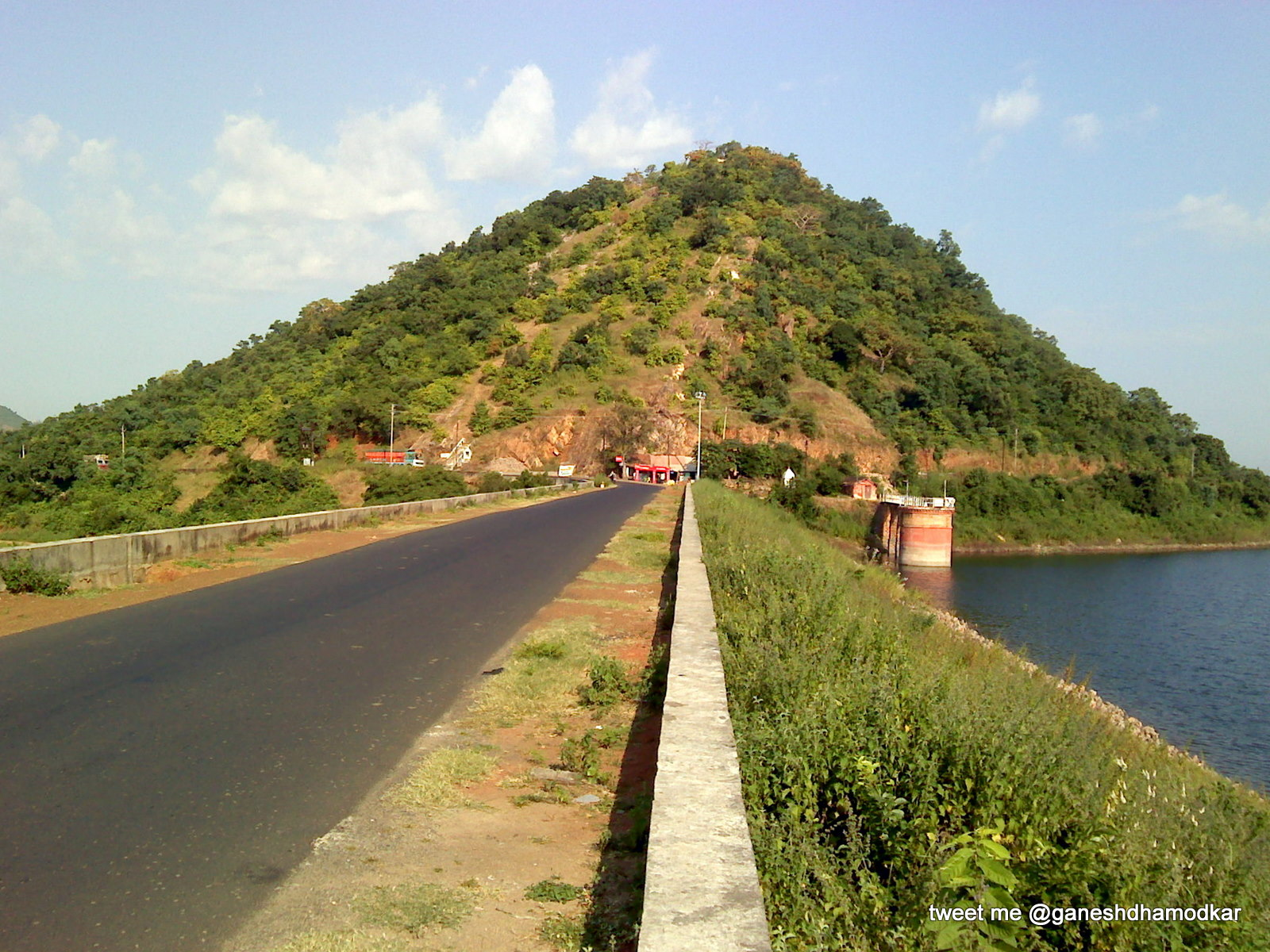

- Location within Maharashtra
- Official name: Ramtek Dam D01103
- Location: Ramtek
- Coordinates: 21.3811003°N 79.3782323°E
- Opening date: 1913
- Owners: Government of Maharashtra, India

Dam and spillways
- Type of dam: Earthfill
- Impounds: Sur River
- Height: 22.2 m (73 ft)
- Length: 229 m (751 ft)
- Dam volume: 1,300 km^{3} (310 cu mi)

Reservoir
- Total capacity: 103,000 km^{3} (25,000 cu mi)
- Surface area: 21,270 km^{2} (8,210 sq mi)

Ramtek Dam, is an earthfill dam on Sur River near Ramtek, Nagpur district in the state of Maharashtra in India.

== Specifications ==
The height of the dam above lowest foundation is 22.2 m (73 ft) while the length is 229 m (751 ft). The volume content is 1,300 km^{3} (310 cu mi) and gross storage capacity is 105,130.00 km^{3} (25,222.03 cu mi).

== Purpose ==
- Irrigation

== See also ==
- Dams in Maharashtra
- List of reservoirs and dams in India
