= Tumsar taluka =

Tumsar Taluka
- Taluka
- Tumsar Taluka Location in Bhandara district (MH), India
- Country: India
- State: Maharashtra
- District: Bhandara district
- Headquarters: Tumsar City

Area
  - Taluka: 837.57 km^{2} (323.39 sq mi)

Population (2011)
  - Taluka: 226,108
  - Density: 269.96/km^{2} (699.19/sq mi)
  - Urban: 49,221
  - Rural: 176,887

Demographics
  - Literacy rate: 74.70
  - Sex ratio: 992

Tumsar Taluka, is a Taluka in Tumsar subdivision of Bhandara district in Maharashtra State of India.
