= Sirsoli =

Village in Maharashtra

Coordinates: 21°11′N 78°06′E

- village
- Interactive map of Sirsoli
- Country: India
- State: Maharashtra
- District: Akola
- Taluka: Telhara

Government
  - Type: Grampanchayat
  - Body: Sirsoli Grampanchayat
- Demonym: Sirsolikar

Languages
  - Official: Marathi
- Time zone: UTC+5:30 (IST)
- PIN: 444126

Sirsoli is a village in Telhara tehsil of Akola district and is known for the Battle of Argaon. The Battle of Argaon took place on 28 November 1803, between the British under the command of General Arthur Wellesley (later the Duke of Wellington) and the forces of The Rajah of Berar under Sindhia of Gwalior. The battlefield was located between Argaon and Sirsoli.

Sirsoli is known for its association with Satyapal Maharaj, a traditional percussionist and spiritual orator recognized as a Sapta Khanjeri Vadak. A khanjeri is a traditional Indian frame drum, and Satyapal Maharaj performs by playing seven khanjeris simultaneously while singing bhajans (devotional songs) composed by prominent saints.

Drawing large audiences across Maharashtra, his performances focus on themes of social reform and personal improvement, largely based on the Gramgeeta, a spiritual and social text written by Sant Tukdoji Maharaj. Over the course of his career, Satyapal Maharaj has conducted approximately 12,000 sapta khanjeri performances across India, including an appearance at the 2010 Marathi Sahitya Sammelan in Thane, Mumbai.

In recognition of his social outreach and public performances, the Government of Maharashtra has honored him with the Vyasanmukti Puraskar (2001) for addiction awareness and the Dalit Mitra Puraskar (2009) for social service.
