= Tiroda taluka =

Tiroda Taluka
- Taluka
- Tiroda Taluka Location in Gondia district (MH), India
- Country: India
- State: Maharashtra
- District: Gondia district
- Headquarters: Tiroda City

Area
  - Taluka: 622.87 km^{2} (240.49 sq mi)

Population (2011)
  - Taluka: 176,254
  - Density: 282.97/km^{2} (732.89/sq mi)
  - Urban: 25,181
  - Rural: 151,073

Demographics
  - Literacy rate: 78.40
  - Sex ratio: 981

Tiroda Taluka alternately spelled as Tirora Taluka (Marathi: तिरोडा तालुका), is a Taluka in subdivision of Gondia district in Maharashtra State of India.
