= Lakhani taluka =

Lakhani Taluka
- Taluka
- Interactive map of Lakhani Taluka
- Country: India
- State: Maharashtra
- District: Bhandara district
- Headquarters: Lakhani City

Area
  - Taluka: 391.03 km^{2} (150.98 sq mi)

Population (2011)
  - Taluka: 128,545
  - Density: 328.73/km^{2} (851.42/sq mi)
  - Urban: 7,576
  - Rural: 120,969

Demographics
  - Literacy rate: 75.96
  - Sex ratio: 984

Lakhani Taluka, is a Taluka in Sakoli subdivision of Bhandara district in Maharashtra State of India. The seat is the city of Lakhani.

== Demographics ==
As per Indian government census of 2011, the population was 128545.

== Villages ==
- Palandur

Year	Male	Female	Total Population	Change	Religion (%)							
Year	Male	Female	Total Population	Change	Hindu	Muslim	Christian	Sikhs	Buddhist	Jain	Other religions and persuasions	Religion not stated
2001	61256	60484	121740	-	84.202	1.286	0.072	0.032	14.193	0.047	0.126	0.043
2011	64785	63760	128545	0.056	84.692	1.350	0.114	0.031	13.340	0.045	0.145	0.282
