= Târsa =

Târsa may refer to several villages in Romania:

- Târsa, a village in Avram Iancu Commune, Alba County
- Târsa, a village in Boșorod Commune, Hunedoara County
- Târsa, a village in Stângăceaua Commune, Mehedinți County
