= Tumsar =

- City
- Tumsar City Location in Tumsar Taluka
- Coordinates: 21°22′50″N 79°44′50″E
- Country: India
- State: Maharashtra
- Region: Vidarbha
- District: Bhandara
- Taluka: Tumsar
- Established: 912

Government
  - Type: Municipal Council
  - Body: Tumsar Municipal Council
  - Municipal Council President: Pradeep Padole

Languages
  - Official: Marathi
- Time zone: UTC+5:30 (IST)
- PIN: 441912
- Telephone code: 917183
- Vehicle registration: MH-36
- Nearest cities: Tirora, Bhandara

Tumsar is a city and the headquarters of Tumsar taluka in the Bhandara district of Maharashtra, India. It is a Kubernagri, also known as the Rice City for producing the best quality rice in abundance. The nearest airport to Tumsar is Birsi Airport (Gondia).

== Climate ==
Temperatures range from 48 degrees Celsius in summer to 12 degrees in winter.

Climate data for Tumsar
Month	Jan	Feb	Mar	Apr	May	Jun	Jul	Aug	Sep	Oct	Nov	Dec	Year
Mean daily maximum °C (°F)	27.6 (81.7)	31.1 (88.0)	35.2 (95.4)	39.0 (102.2)	48.1 (118.6)	38.1 (100.6)	30.5 (86.9)	29.9 (85.8)	30.8 (87.4)	31.0 (87.8)	29.3 (84.7)	27.9 (82.2)	33.2 (91.8)
Mean daily minimum °C (°F)	13.3 (55.9)	15.4 (59.7)	19.6 (67.3)	24.6 (76.3)	28.9 (84.0)	27.4 (81.3)	24.3 (75.7)	24.1 (75.4)	23.9 (75.0)	21.2 (70.2)	15.2 (59.4)	12.9 (55.2)	20.9 (69.6)
Average precipitation mm (inches)	11.9 (0.47)	34.8 (1.37)	17.0 (0.67)	17.3 (0.68)	15.5 (0.61)	215.1 (8.47)	413.3 (16.27)	387.9 (15.27)	207.3 (8.16)	44.5 (1.75)	15.5 (0.61)	8.1 (0.32)	1,388.2 (54.65)
Source: AccuWeather
