= Gondia taluka =

Administrative division in India

Gondia is a taluka in the Gondia district of Maharashtra state in Vidharbha, India, alongside eight others: Amgaon, Arjuni-Morgaon, Deori, Gondiya, Goregaon, Sadak-Arjuni, Salekasa and Tirora.
