= Khopadi =

Village in Maharashtra

- Village
- Interactive map of Khopadi
- Coordinates: 19°50′29″N 74°06′39″E
- Country: India
- State: Maharashtra
- District: Nashik

Languages
  - Official: Marathi
- Time zone: UTC+5:30 (IST)
- PIN: 422103
- Telephone code: 02551
- Vehicle registration: MH 15

Khopadi is a village in Sinnar taluka of the Nashik district in the Indian state Maharashtra. As per constitution of India and Panchyati Raaj Act, Khopadi Kh village is administrated by Sarpanch (Head of Village) who is elected representative of village. Ganesh Gholap is Newly elected sarpanch of Khopadi Kd.

== Geography ==
The Devnadi river bisects the village and hence Khopadi Bk. and Khopadi Kd. are two parts.

Khopadi-Kd.is a riverside village belongs to the Hindu Vanjari community people and Khopadi Bk. belongs to the Maratha and Buddhist community.

== Demographics ==
The village has a population around one thousand. People in village are more over farmer, shopkeepers and restaurant and hotel owners. Tourism has become quite popular. Tourists stop at Khopadi over Shirdi highway as it is on the way to the Shirdi Sai Baba temple.

== Attractions ==
Krishnath Baba mandir of Khopadi is a local temple. Its priest is recognized as Lord Krishnath Baba, an avatar of the Hindu god Krishna while some worship him as an avatar of Dattatreya. Devotees of Krishnath Baba believe that the god has power to conquer evil spirits.

Khopadi has great economic importance due to industrial corporations including SEZ, Malegone MIDC, and Musalgone MIDC across the area. The Nashik-Shirdi Highway and nearest Nahsik-Puna Highway adds more economic status to the village.
