= Pimpalgaon, Thane =

Village in Maharashtra

Pimpalgaon
- village
- Country: India
- State: Maharashtra
- District: Thane
- Taluka: Bhiwandi

Population (2011)
  - Total: 2,898
- Time zone: UTC+5:30 (IST)
- 2011 census code: 552656

Pimpalgaon is a village in the Thane district of Maharashtra, India. It is located in the Bhiwandi taluka.

== Demographics ==
According to the 2011 census of India, Pimpalgaon has 726 households. The effective literacy rate (i.e. the literacy rate of population excluding children aged 6 and below) is 86.16%.

Demographics (2011 Census)
	Total	Male	Female
Population	2898	1778	1120
Children aged below 6 years	369	186	183
Scheduled caste	234	135	99
Scheduled tribe	67	40	27
Literates	2179	1466	713
Workers (all)	1412	1221	191
Main workers (total)	1246	1086	160
Main workers: Cultivators	149	73	76
Main workers: Agricultural labourers	14	7	7
Main workers: Household industry workers	16	8	8
Main workers: Other	1067	998	69
Marginal workers (total)	166	135	31
Marginal workers: Cultivators	23	15	8
Marginal workers: Agricultural labourers	0	0	0
Marginal workers: Household industry workers	4	2	2
Marginal workers: Others	139	118	21
Non-workers	1486	557	929
