= Sakoli taluka =

Sakoli Taluka
- Taluka
- Sakoli Taluka Location in Bhandara district (MH), India
- Country: India
- State: Maharashtra
- District: Bhandara district
- Headquarters: Sakoli City

Area
  - Taluka: 633.73 km^{2} (244.68 sq mi)

Population (2011)
  - Taluka: 136,879
  - Density: 215.99/km^{2} (559.41/sq mi)
  - Urban: 14,636
  - Rural: 122,243

Demographics
  - Literacy rate: 74.98
  - Sex ratio: 974

Sakoli Taluka, is a Taluka in Sakoli subdivision of Bhandara district in Maharashtra State of India.

== Demographics ==
As per Indian government census of 2011, the population of taluka (district) was 136879.

Year	Male	Female	Total Population	Change	Religion (%)							
Year	Male	Female	Total Population	Change	Hindu	Muslim	Christian	Sikhs	Buddhist	Jain	Other religions and persuasions	Religion not stated
2001	65457	64018	129475	-	83.500	1.119	0.094	0.015	14.511	0.065	0.659	0.036
2011	69352	67527	136879	0.057	84.340	1.197	0.088	0.042	13.824	0.100	0.328	0.081
