= Tarsa, India =

Village in Maharashtra

Tarsa
- village
- Location in Maharashtra, India Tarsa (India)
- Coordinates: 21.225860°N 79.3810200°E
- Country: India
- State: Maharashtra
- District: Nagpur
- Talukas: Mouda tahasil

Languages
  - Official: Marathi
- Time zone: UTC+5:30 (IST)

Tarsa is a village in Mouda tahasil of Nagpur district of Maharashtra. A local leader and former vice-president of Nagpur Zilla Parishad Dnyaneshwar Sathawane was lynched on 8 February 2008 by Shiv Sena supporters.

The nearest railway station is Tarsa Railway Station. The railways station is surrounded by many villages. Some of the villages around Tarsa are Nimkheda, Tuman, Dhani, Shivaji Nagar and Shanti Nagar. The region is rich in fertile lands and the land is irrigated by the water canal which comes from Ramtek dam.

The area is famous for Paddy fields and the economy developed around Paddy like Rice mills etc.
