= Lakhandur taluka =

Lakhandur Taluka
- Taluka
- Interactive map of Lakhandur Taluka
- Country: India
- State: Maharashtra
- District: Bhandara district
- Headquarters: Lakhandur Town

Area
  - Taluka: 424.75 km^{2} (164.00 sq mi)

Population (2011)
  - Taluka: 123,573
  - Density: 290.93/km^{2} (753.51/sq mi)
  - Urban: 9,231
  - Rural: 114,342

Demographics
  - Literacy rate: 78.76
  - Sex ratio: 992

Lakhandur Taluka is a Taluka in Sakoli subdivision of Bhandara district in Maharashtra State of India.

== Demographics ==
As per Indian government census of 2011, the population was 123573.

Year	Male	Female	Total Population	Change	Religion (%)							
Year	Male	Female	Total Population	Change	Hindu	Muslim	Christian	Sikhs	Buddhist	Jain	Other religions and persuasions	Religion not stated
2001	56971	56364	113335	-	80.279	0.583	0.084	0.056	18.323	0.045	0.618	0.013
2011	62024	61549	123573	0.090	81.010	0.764	0.122	0.079	17.277	0.049	0.596	0.103
