= Mauda Taluka =

Taluka in Nagpur district

- Taluka
- Country: India
- State: Maharashtra
- District: Nagpur district
- Headquarters: Mauda Town

Area
  - Taluka: 619.42 km^{2} (239.16 sq mi)

Population (2011)
  - Taluka: 139,776
  - Density: 225.66/km^{2} (584.45/sq mi)
  - Urban: 14,606
  - Rural: 125,170

Demographics
  - Literacy rate: 73.28%
  - Sex ratio: 935

Mauda Taluka, is a Taluka in Mauda subdivision of Nagpur district in Maharashtra State of India.

== Demographics ==
Mauda taluka has a population of 1,39,776 according to the 2011 census. It had a literacy rate of 73.28% and a sex ratio of 935 females per 1000 males. 15,580 (11.15%) are between 0–6 years of age. Scheduled Castes and Scheduled Tribes make up 12.89% and 7.18% of the population respectively.
