= Pauni taluka =

Coordinates: 20.78°N 79.63°E

Pauni Taluka
- Taluka
- Pauni Taluka Location in Bhandara district (MH), India
- Country: India
- State: Maharashtra
- District: Bhandara district
- Headquarters: Pauni City

Area
  - Taluka: 662.15 km^{2} (255.66 sq mi)

Population (2011)
  - Taluka: 154,588
  - Density: 233.46/km^{2} (604.67/sq mi)
  - Urban: 22,821
  - Rural: 131,767

Demographics
  - Literacy rate: 72.85
  - Sex ratio: 986

Pauni Taluka, is a Taluka in Bhandara subdivision of Bhandara district in Maharashtra State of India.

== Demographics ==
As per Indian government census of 2011, the population was 154588.

Year	Male	Female	Total Population	Change	Religion (%)							
Year	Male	Female	Total Population	Change	Hindu	Muslim	Christian	Sikhs	Buddhist	Jain	Other religions and persuasions	Religion not stated
2001	76706	74781	151487	-	78.819	1.715	0.082	0.086	19.082	0.051	0.133	0.032
2011	77848	76740	154588	0.020	78.274	1.734	0.101	0.114	19.036	0.032	0.329	0.379

== Settlements in Pauni Taluka ==
- Pauni - Municipal seat
- Adyal
- Kurza
