= Tirora =

Tirora Tiroda
- City
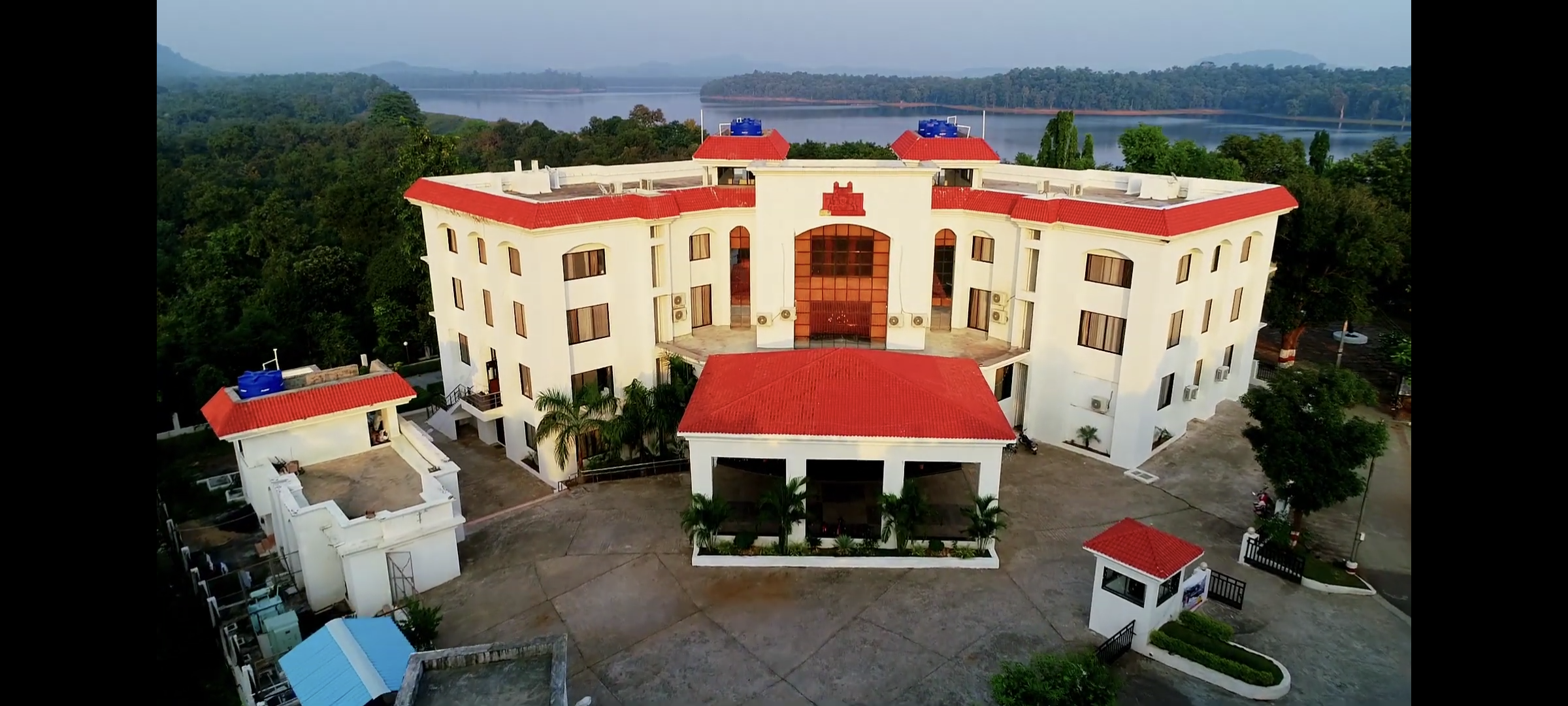
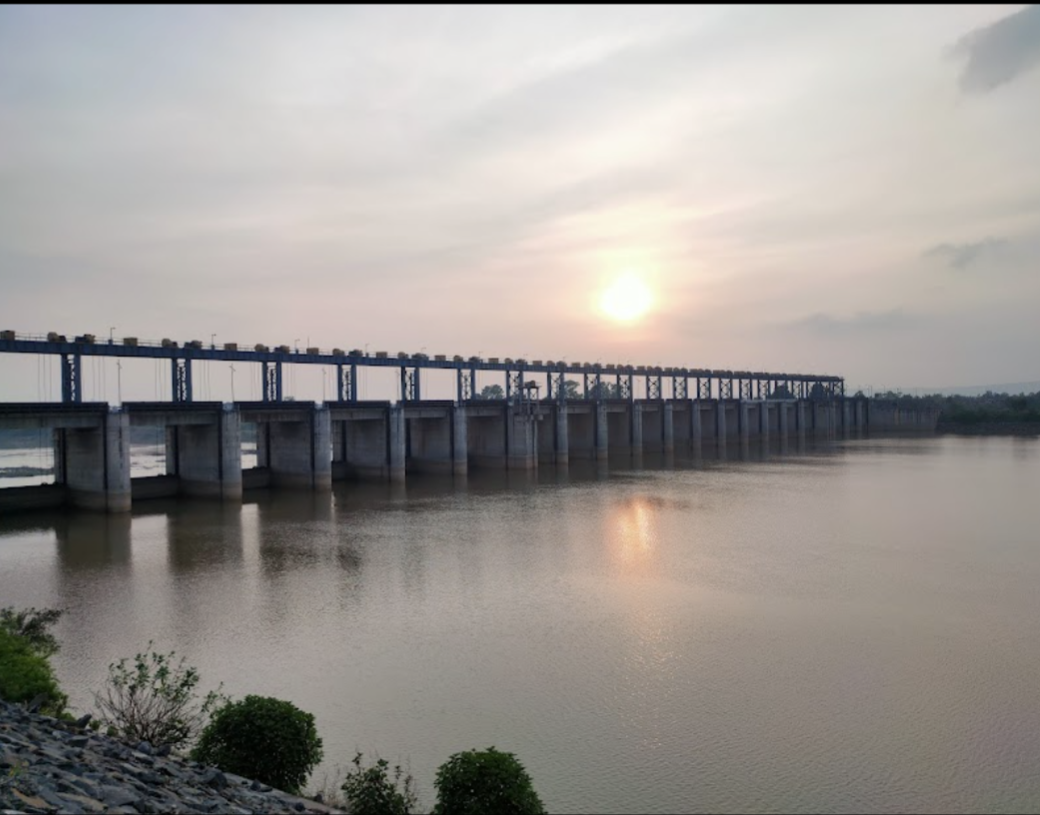
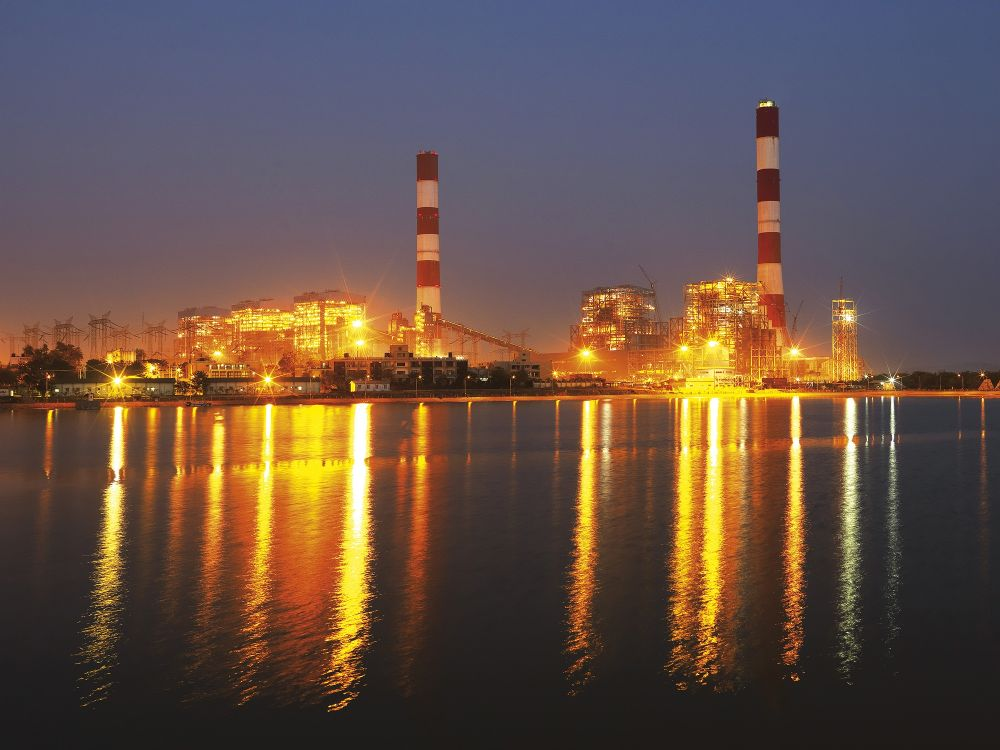
- MTDC Bodalkasa Resort, Kawlewada Dam, Adani Power Plant Tirora.
- Tiroda City Location in Tiroda Taluka
- Location in Maharashtra, India Tirora (India)
- Coordinates: 21.4072084°N 79.932575°E
- Country: India
- State: Maharashtra
- Region: Vidarbha
- Division: Nagpur
- District: Gondia
- Taluka: Tiroda
- Established: 1952

Government
  - Type: Municipal Council
  - Body: Tirora Municipal Council

Area
  - City: 22 km^{2} (8.5 sq mi)
- Elevation: 302 m (991 ft)

Population (2011)
  - City: 25,181
  - Density: 1,100/km^{2} (3,000/sq mi)
  - Metro: 176,254
- Time zone: UTC+5:30 (IST)
- PIN: 441911
- Telephone code: 07198
- Vehicle registration: MH-35
- Website: https://gondia.gov.in/en/tirora-tahsil/

Tirora (also spelled Tiroda) is a city and a municipal council in Gondia (Gondiya) district of Maharashtra, India. Adani Power Maharashtra Limited, Tirora is the largest coal based Thermal Power Plant in the state of Maharashtra, India. The plant has a capacity to generate 3300 MW power through its 5 units of 660 MW capacity each. The nearest airport is Birsi (Gondia).

== Demographics ==
As of 2011 India census, Tirora had a population of 25,181. Males constitute 50% of the population and females 50%. Tirora has an average literacy rate of 75%, higher than the national average of 59.5%: male literacy is 83%, and female literacy is 67%. In Tirora, 12% of the population is under 6 years of age.

Year	Male	Female	Total Population	Change	Religion (%)							
Year	Male	Female	Total Population	Change	Hindu	Muslim	Christian	Sikhs	Buddhist	Jain	Other religions and persuasions	Religion not stated
2001	11394	11135	22529	-	79.231	7.652	0.071	0.018	12.819	0.089	0.071	0.049
2011	12739	12442	25181	0.118	77.785	7.529	0.155	0.064	13.046	0.107	0.056	1.259

== Industry ==
Adani Power Maharashtra Limited (APML), is 3 km away from Tirora on Tirora-Gondia state road. Coal is transported to Adani power, Ltd through a railway which is connected to Kachewani Railway Station. Water is being used from nearby weir constructed on Wainganga River. An 85.89% subsidiary of Adani Power Limited is implementing 3300 MW Thermal Power Station in Tirora.
