= Bhandara taluka =

Bhandara Taluka
- Taluka
- Interactive map of Bhandara Taluka
- Country: India
- State: Maharashtra
- District: Bhandara district
- Headquarters: Bhandara City

Area
  - Taluka: 643 km^{2} (248 sq mi)

Population (2011)
  - Taluka: 280,030
  - Density: 436/km^{2} (1,130/sq mi)
  - Urban: 126,519
  - Rural: 153,511

Demographics
  - Literacy rate: 78.23
  - Sex ratio: 974

Bhandara Taluka, is a Taluka in Bhandara subdivision of Bhandara district in Maharashtra State of India.
