= Mohadi taluka =

- Taluka
- Interactive map of Mohadi taluka
- Country: India
- State: Maharashtra
- District: Bhandara district
- Headquarters: Mohadi City

Area
  - Taluka: 488.61 km^{2} (188.65 sq mi)

Population (2011)
  - Taluka: 150,611
  - Density: 308.24/km^{2} (798.35/sq mi)
  - Urban: 13,058
  - Rural: 137,553

Demographics
  - Literacy rate: 74.67
  - Sex ratio: 978

Mohadi Taluka, is a taluka in Tumsar subdivision of Bhandara district in Maharashtra State of India.
