= Bhandara, India =

Bhandara
- City
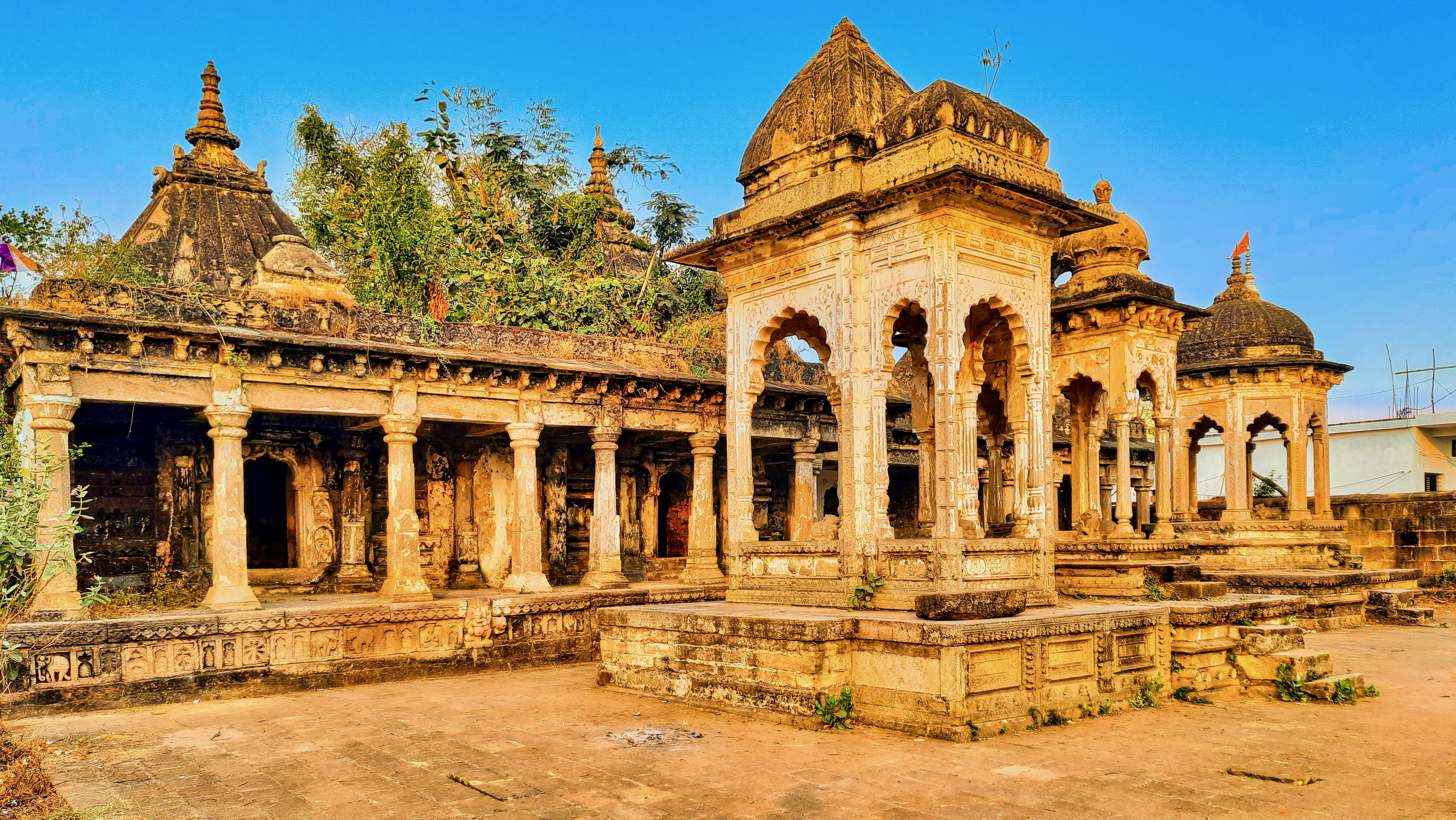
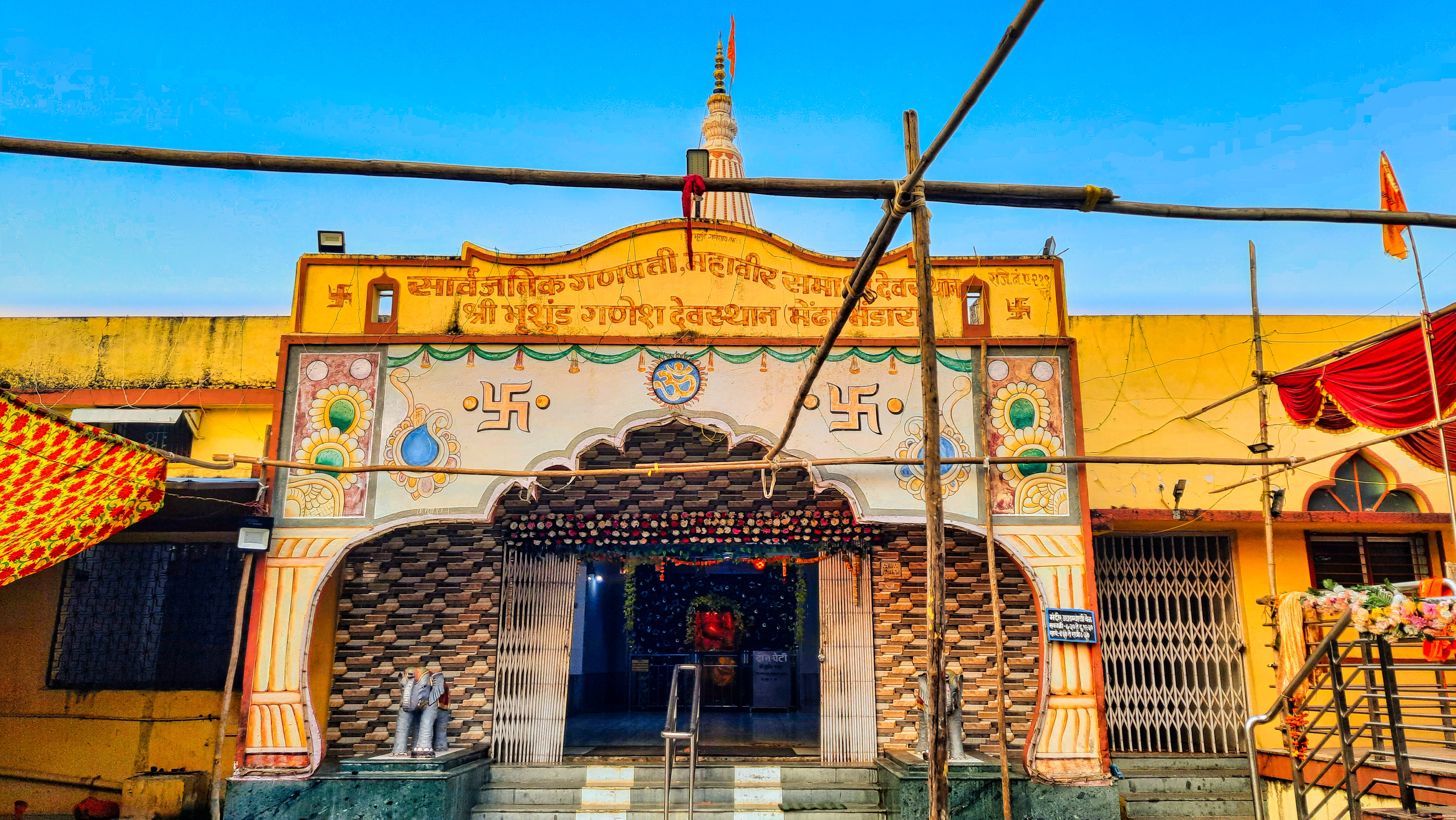
- Shiva temple, Bhandara Bhrishunda Ganesha Temple, Bhandara
- Nickname: Brass city of India
- Interactive map of Bhandara
- Location in Maharashtra, India Bhandara (India)
- Coordinates: 21.17°N 79.65°E
- Country: India
- State: Maharashtra
- Region: Vidarbha
- District: Bhandara
- Taluka: Bhandara

Government
  - Type: Municipal Council
  - Body: Bhandara Municipal Council

Area
  - Total: 30 km^{2} (12 sq mi)
- Elevation: 244 m (801 ft)

Population (2011)
  - Total: 91,845
  - Rank: 8th in Vidharbha
  - Density: 3,100/km^{2} (7,900/sq mi)
- Demonym: Bhandarakar

Language
  - Official: Marathi
- Time zone: UTC+5:30 (IST)
- PIN: 441904, 441905, 441906
- Telephone code: +91-7184
- Vehicle registration: MH-36
- Sex ratio: 979 per 1000 males ♂/♀
- Nearest cities: Nagpur and Tumsar
- Website: http://www.bhandara.gov.in

Bhandara is a city located in the Bhandara district of Maharashtra State of India, near the bank of confluence of river Wainganga and its tributary Sur. It serves the administrative headquarters of eponymous Bhandara Taluka and Bhandara district. It is connected with NH-53 and NH-247.

== Overview ==
Bhandara serves as an agricultural center for farmers in the region, who mostly grow rice. The city speaks Marathi language. Bhandara city is famous for brass and is known as ' Brass City ' also, Bhandara, as a district is famous for lakes and is known as ' District of lakes ' . Bhandara is split between two rivers, the Wainganga and the Sur, and crossed by National Highway No. 6. The city is surrounded by industries like Ashok Leyland, Sunflag Steel and an ordnance factory. The Wainganga is the principal river in the district and the only stream that does not dry up in the hot weather.

The Norgyaling Tibetan settlement, the only Tibetan community in Maharashtra, was established near Bhandara in 1972. About 1,000 Tibetans live in Norgyaling.

== History ==
According to local interpretation, the name Bhandara is a corruption of Bhanara. Reference to Bhanara is found in an inscription from 1100 AD in Ratanpur. The district was under regency administration from 1818 to 1830. Prior to 1820, the district was administered from Lanji; the headquarters of the district was shifted to Bhandara in 1820–1821. The area became British Territory in 1853. From 1947 to 1956 the district of Bhandara, along with the other districts of the Vidarbha region, continued to form a part of the central provinces. With the reorganization of states in 1956, Bhandara district was transferred from Madhya Pradesh to the Bombay State, which came into existence in the same year. In 1960 it became part of the newly formed state of Maharashtra.

== Geography ==
Bhandara is located at 21.17°N 79.65°E in the north-east part of the state. It has an average elevation of 244 metres (800 feet).

It is 60 km from the city of Nagpur. It falls on the major National Highway 53 joining Mumbai and Kolkata.

== Climate ==
The weather is extreme in all seasons, with temperatures in the summer as high as 45 °C and in winter as cool as 8 °C.

Climate data for Bhandara
Month	Jan	Feb	Mar	Apr	May	Jun	Jul	Aug	Sep	Oct	Nov	Dec	Year
Mean daily maximum °C (°F)	27.6 (81.7)	31.1 (88.0)	35.2 (95.4)	39.0 (102.2)	42.1 (107.8)	38.1 (100.6)	30.5 (86.9)	29.9 (85.8)	30.8 (87.4)	31.0 (87.8)	29.3 (84.7)	27.9 (82.2)	32.7 (90.9)
Mean daily minimum °C (°F)	13.3 (55.9)	15.4 (59.7)	19.6 (67.3)	24.6 (76.3)	28.9 (84.0)	27.4 (81.3)	24.3 (75.7)	24.1 (75.4)	23.9 (75.0)	21.2 (70.2)	15.2 (59.4)	12.9 (55.2)	20.9 (69.6)
Average precipitation mm (inches)	11.9 (0.47)	34.8 (1.37)	17.0 (0.67)	17.3 (0.68)	15.5 (0.61)	215.1 (8.47)	413.3 (16.27)	387.9 (15.27)	207.3 (8.16)	44.5 (1.75)	15.5 (0.61)	8.1 (0.32)	1,388.2 (54.65)
Source: Government of Maharashtra

== Demographics ==
As of 2011, according to the census, Bhandara had a population of 91,845. Males constitute 51% of the population and females 49%. Bhandara has an average literacy rate of 80%, higher than the national average of 74.04%; with male literacy of 85% and female literacy of 75%. Eleven percent of the population is under 6 years of age. Bhandara is surrounded by five villages on its outskirts, Ganeshpur, Bela, Bhojapur, Khokarla, and Takli, which, combined with the city proper, yields a population of about 125000.

=== Religion ===
According to recent census of 2011, Hinduism is predominant religion in Bhandara city and its adherent are 77.23 percent of total population.

Year	Male	Female	Total Population	Change
2001	43553	41660	85213	-
2011	46409	45436	91845	0.078

Religion in Bhandara (2011)
Religion	Percent
Hinduism	77.23%
Islam	10.85%
Buddhism	10.54%
Others	1.38%

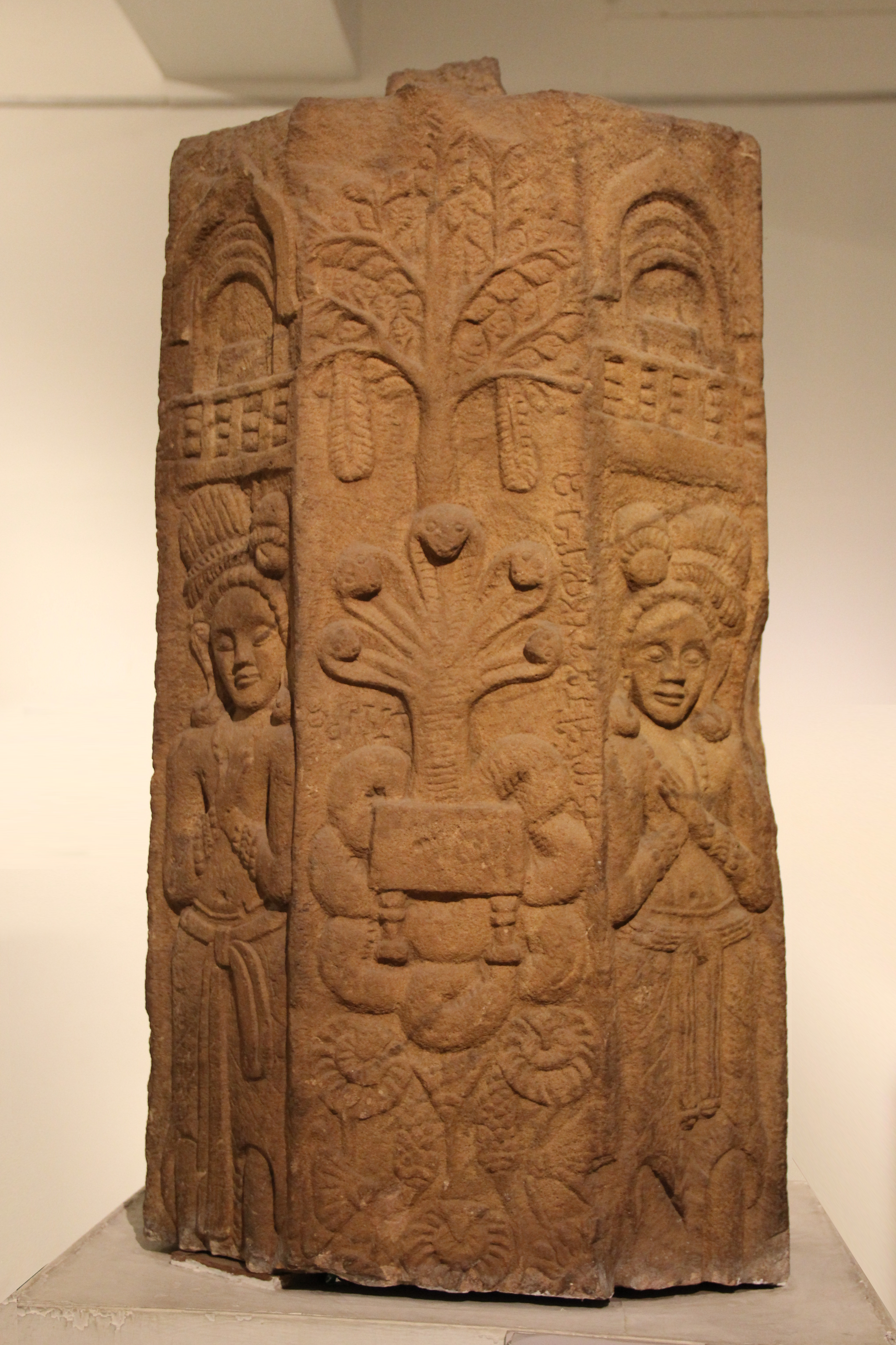
Buddhist Sculpture in Bhandara

== Languages ==
Marathi is spoken by majority of the population in Bhandara while Lodhi, Powari, Halbi, Koshti, Hindi and Kalaari are spoken by some communities. Marathi and English are official and co-official languages of the city, respectively.

== Transport ==
Bhandara falls on [[National Highway 53 (India)|National Highway 53]] and National Highway 247. It is directly connected to Nagpur and Raipur by private and government bus services. It is one of the divisions of the MSRTC. It has very good connectivity with neighboring Madhya Pradesh.

The Bhandara Road railway station (BRD) serves the city and surrounding region. Bhandara is directly connected to the state capital Mumbai, Raipur, Nagpur, and Kolkata by Indian Railways.

There is no air transportation in Bhandara. The nearest airport is Dr. Babasaheb Ambedkar International Airport, Nagpur.
