= Bhandara district =

- District of Maharashtra
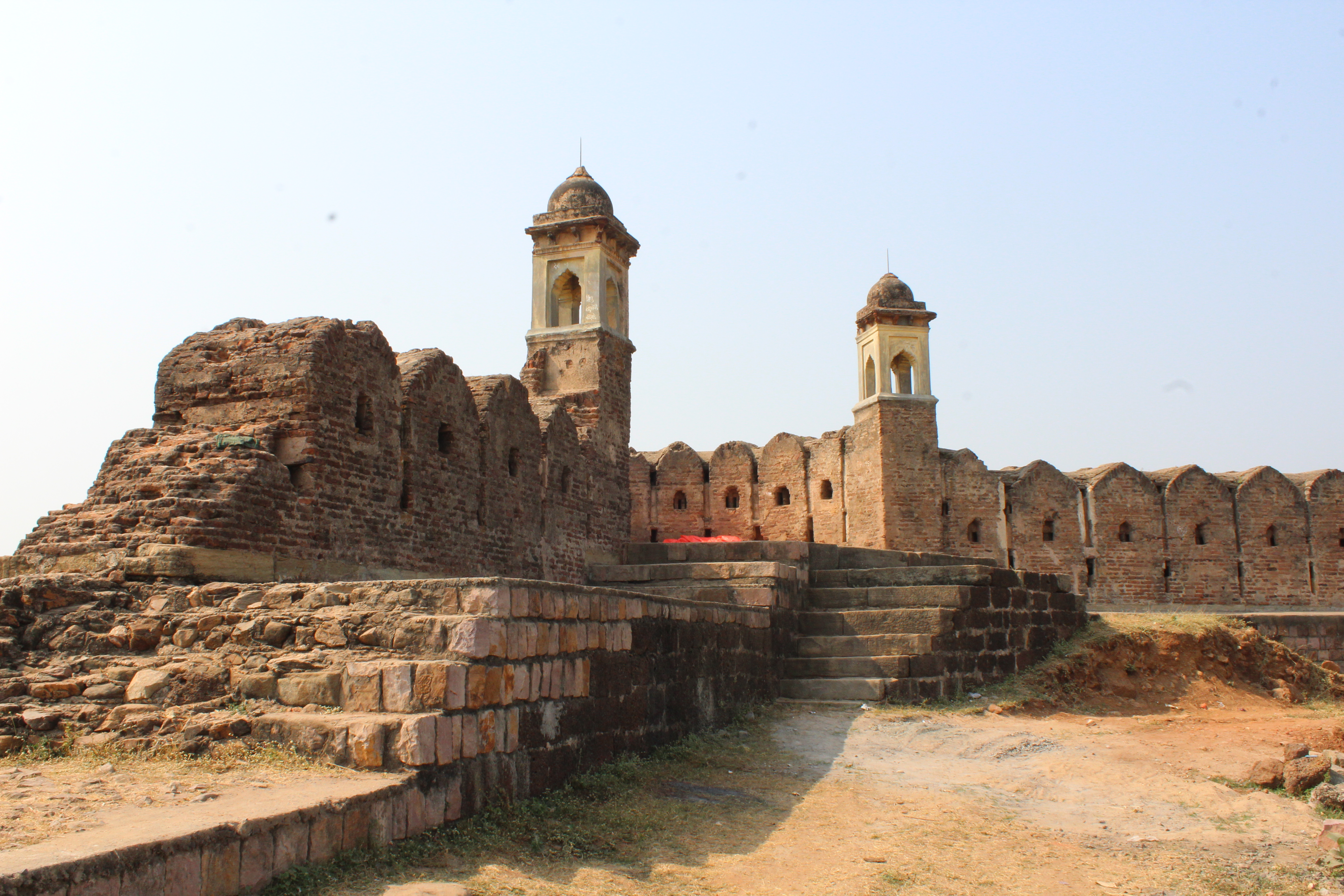
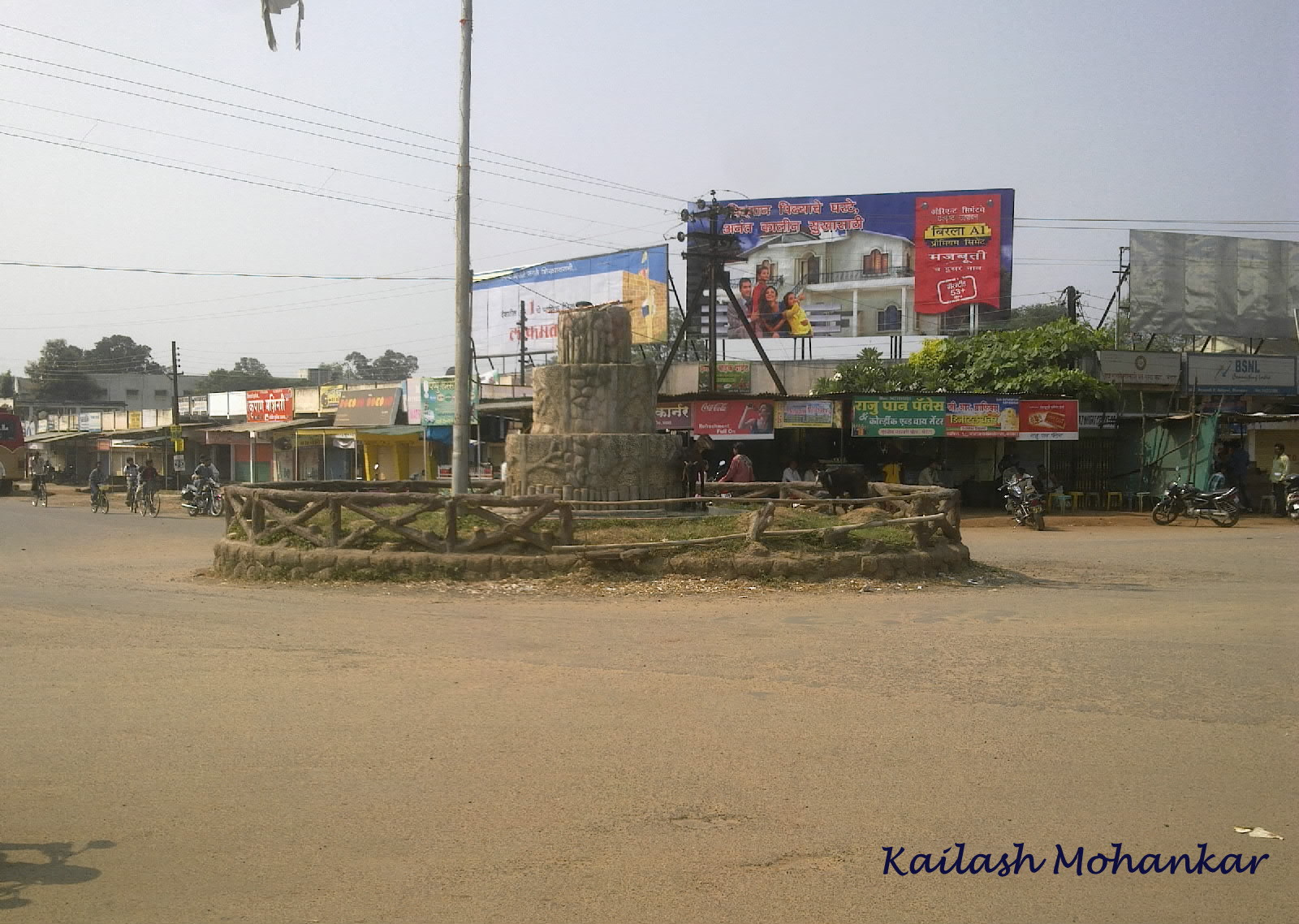
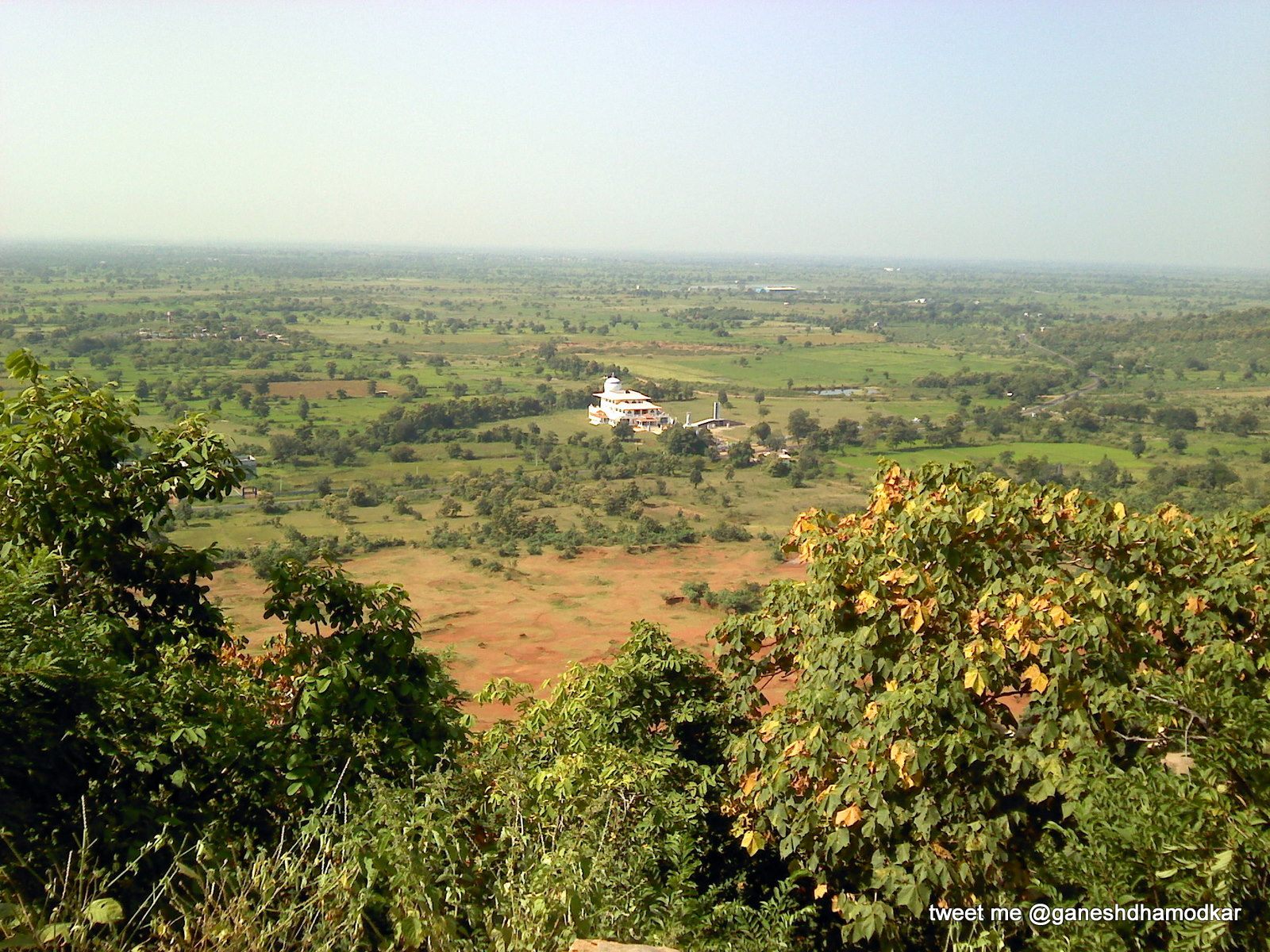
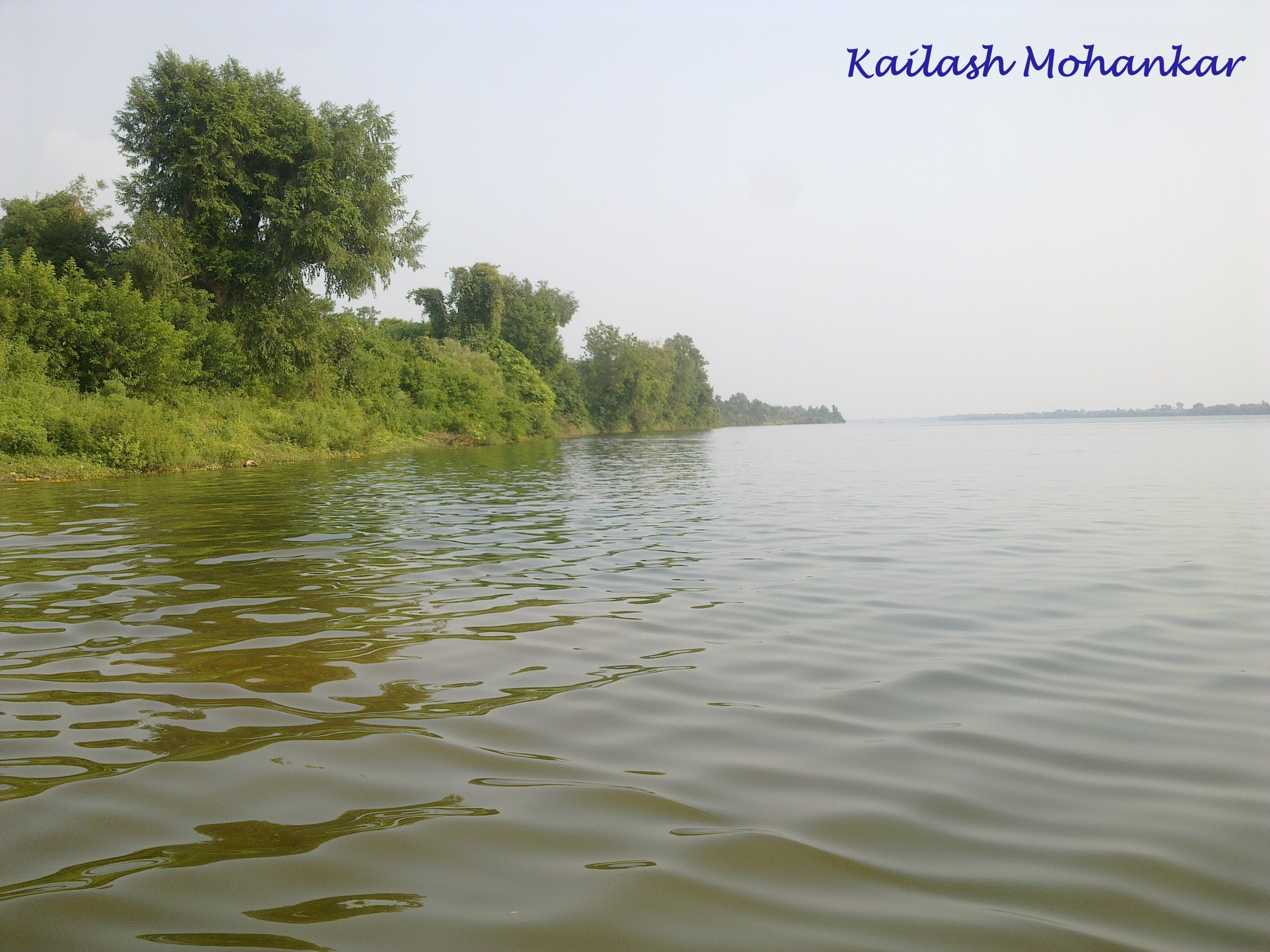
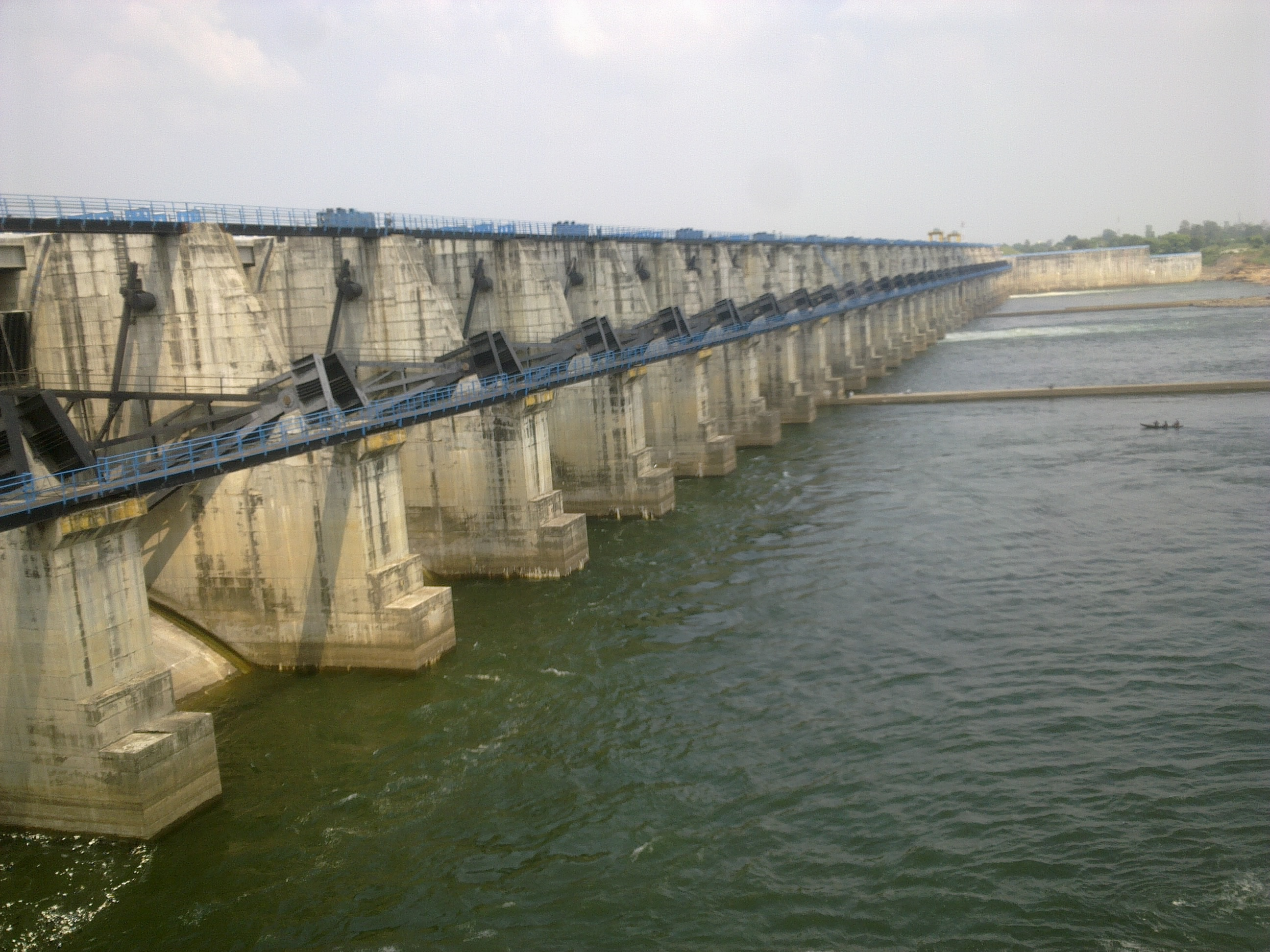
- Clockwise from top-left: Pauni Fort, Muslim Library Chowk, Bhandara, rivers in Ambhora, Gose Khurd Dam in Pauni, Nagarjuna Vihara
- Interactive map of Bhandara district
- Coordinates (Bhandara): 21.1706°N 79.6566°E
- Country: India
- State: Maharashtra
- Division: Nagpur
- Headquarters: Bhandara
- Talukas: 1. Bhandara, 2. Tumsar, 3. Pauni and 4. Mohadi, 5. Sakoli, 6. Lakhani, 7. Lakhandur

Government
  - Body: Bhandara Zilla Parishad
  - Guardian Minister: Sanjay Waman Sawakare; Cabinet Minister
  - President Zilla Parishad: President Kavita Uakey; Vice President Eknathbhau Fendar
  - District Collector: Shri. Dr.Sanjay Kolte (IAS)
  - CEO Zilla Parishad: Mr Milindkumar Salawe (IAS)
  - MPs: Prashant Yadaorao Padole (Bhandara–Gondiya)

Area
  - Total: 3,717 km^{2} (1,435 sq mi)

Population (2011)
  - Total: 1,200,334
  - Density: 322.9/km^{2} (836.4/sq mi)
  - Urban: 19.48%
- Time zone: UTC+05:30 (IST)
- Major highways: NH53, NH247, NH353C.
- Average annual precipitation: 1327 mm
- Website: bhandara.gov.in

Bhandara district (Marathi pronunciation: [bʰəɳɖaːɾa]) is an administrative district in the state of Maharashtra in India. The district headquarters are located at Bhandara. The district occupies an area of 3717 km2 and has a population of 1,200,334 (605,520 males and 594,814 females), of which 19.48% are urban as of 2011. The growth rate of Bhandara is 5.56% Bhandara has a mixed economy with agriculture, industries and forest resources. Bhandara is known for its large production of rice. Tumsar, a tehsil town, is a noted rice market. Bhandara town is also known as "Brass City" due to the presence of a large brass products industry. Bhandara has several notable sites, like Ambagad Fort, Brahmi, Chinchgad, and Dighori.

The district is also known for the Ordnance Factory Bhandara of the Ordnance Factories Board, which manufactures products for the Indian Armed Forces. It is located on an estate which is commonly known as Jawaharnagar colony. There is only one Kendriya Vidyalaya in the Bhandara district. Ashok Leyland, a Hinduja Group Company, has a production facility at Gadegaon near Bhandara. Sunflag Iron Steel company and Shivmangal Ispat Pvt. Ltd. are other major industrial undertakings in the district.

== Etymology ==
The name Bhandara is a corruption of Bhanara. A reference to this name is found in an inscription of 1100 A.D. traced at Ratanpur.

== History ==
In the seventh century, the district was included in the territories of the Haihaya yadav kings of Chhattisgarh, whose kingdom was known as Maha Kosala. The name of the district is derived from 'Bhannara', the name by which it is mentioned in a stone inscription at Ratanpur, which confirms that the name dates back to at least the 11th century. The Bhandara is also known as Bhandakdesh and in mythological stories it is known as the king of this kingdom bring Ganga river in this region as Vainganga. Bhandara is also Formerly a part of the territories of the Haihaya Rajput kings of Chhattisgarh, Bhandara was taken over by the Panwar Rajputs in the 12th century, followed by the Gond chiefs.

By the 17th century, the district was made a part of Berar by Peshwas, who had invaded the region during the period. In 1699, the region came under the control of Parasoji Bhonsle along with the territories of Vidarbha and Berar. Raghoji Bhonsle of Vidarbha became the leader in 1743, and was succeeded by his son Janoji after his death in 1755. The feudal dynasty of Lanji governed the region from 1818 to 1830, and formed the Bhandara district in 1821.

Peshwas were ousted by Nizams during the 1850s, who ceded Berar to the British East India Company in 1903. With the re-organisation of states in 1956, Bhandara was transferred to Bombay Province from the state of Madhya Pradesh. After the formation of Maharashtra in 1960, Bhandara evolved as a district of the state. The erstwhile Bhandara district was bifurcated on 1 May 1999, and a new district, Gondia, was formed. Thus, Gondia and Bhandara came into existence.

== Ambagad Fort ==
This medieval period fort is situated in Tumsar, about 13 km away from Tumsar. It was constructed by Raja Khan Pathan, the subhedar of Bakht Buland Shah, the ruler of Devgadh around 1700 AD. Later, it came under the possession of Raghoji I Bhonsle of Nagpur, who used it as a prison for captives, before it was eventually taken over by the British.

== Geography ==
Bhandara is one of the major administrative districts in Maharashtra, and is located in the Nagpur division at 21°10'N 79°39'E. The district is enveloped by Balaghat district of Madhya Pradesh in the north and Chandrapur in the south, smallest border with Gadchiroli in the southeast while Gondia and Nagpur mark its eastern and western borders respectively. Covering an area of 3716 km^{2}, the district of Bhandara is segregated into three sub-divisions, Bhandara, Tumsar and Sakoli, that are further divided into seven talukas. Bhandara sub-division is divided into two talukas: Bhandara and Pauni. Tumsar division have Tumsar and Mohadi. Sakoli sub-division is divided into three talukas: Sakoli, Lakhani, and Lakhandur.

== Demographics ==
Historical population
Year	Pop.	±% p.a.
1901	276,306	—
1911	322,277	+1.55%
1921	337,193	+0.45%
1931	387,388	+1.40%
1941	452,512	+1.57%
1951	503,536	+1.07%
1961	593,898	+1.66%
1971	731,053	+2.10%
1981	850,488	+1.52%
1991	1,021,408	+1.85%
2001	1,136,146	+1.07%
2011	1,200,334	+0.55%

According to the 2011 census Bhandara district has a population of 1,200,334, roughly equal to the nation of Timor-Leste or the US state of Rhode Island. This gives it a ranking of 397th in India (out of a total of 640). The district has a population density of 294 inhabitants per square kilometre (760/sq mi). Its population growth rate over the decade 2001–2011 was 5.65%. Bhandara has a sex ratio of 982 females for every 1000 males, and a literacy rate of 83.76%. 19.48% of the population live in urban areas. Scheduled Castes and Scheduled Tribes make up 16.69% and 7.41% of the population respectively.

The major Hindu castes include Powar, Teli, Kunbi etc.

=== Religion ===
Religions in Bhandara district (2011)
Religion	Percent
Hinduism	84.09%
Buddhism	12.87%
Islam	2.21%
Other or not stated	0.83%

According to the census of 2011, Hinduism is the predominant religion in Bhandara district. Its adherents form the majority of the total population, at 84.09%. Buddhism is the second largest religion at 12.87%. The Buddhists follow the Navayana school of Buddhism. Islam, a predominantly urban religion, is a small minority. 0.21% people didn't state their religion in the census. Other religions are stated to be 0.30% of population.

=== Language ===
Languages in Bhandara district (2011)
1. Marathi (93.2%)
2. Hindi (4.03%)
3. Others (2.78%)

At the time of the 2011 Census of India, 93.19% of the population in the district spoke Marathi and 4.03% Hindi as their first language.

Marathi is the official as well as the most spoken language in the district. Bhandara city has many people from other Indian states as well as people belonging to the world's major faiths.

== Politics ==
There are three Vidhan Sabha constituencies in this district: Tumsar, Bhandara (SC) and Sakoli. All of these are part of the Bhandara-Gondiya Lok Sabha constituency.

=== Members of Parliament ===
- Prashant Yadaorao Padole (Indian National Congress)
  (Bhandara–Gondiya)

=== Guardian Minister ===
Guardian Minister Bhandara
- पालकमंत्री भंडारा
- Emblem of India
- Incumbent; Sanjay Waman Sawakare; Cabinet Minister since 05 October 2024
- Style: The Honourable
- Residence: Mumbai Sagar Bangla
- Appointer: Chief Minister of Maharashtra
- Term length: 5 years / No time limit
- Website: bhandara.gov.in/en/

==== list of Guardian Minister ====
Name	Term of office
Satej Patil; Minister of State	9 January 2020 - 3 March 2020
Vishwajeet Kadam; Minister of State	3 March 2020 - 29 June 2022
Devendra Fadnavis; Deputy Chief Minister	27 September 2022 - 4 October 2023
Vijaykumar Krishnarao Gavit; Cabinet Minister	4 October 2023 - 4 December 2024
Sanjay Waman Sawakare; Cabinet Minister	5 October 2024 - Incumbent

==== District Magistrate / Collector ====
Name	Term of office
Dr Sanjay Kolte(IAS)	2024 - Incumbent

== Economy ==
Bhandara has a mixed economy including agriculture, manufacturing and forest resources. With several ancient temples and historical monuments, along with lakes, parks and sanctuaries, Bhandara attracts many tourists.

In 2006 the Ministry of Panchayati Raj named Bhandara one of the country's 250 most backward districts (out of a total of 640). It is one of the twelve districts in Maharashtra currently receiving funds from the Backward Regions Grant Fund Programme (BRGF).

== Geographical indication ==
Bhandara Chinoor Rice was awarded the Geographical Indication (GI) status tag from the Geographical Indications Registry under the Union Government of India on 01/07/2023 (valid until 30/04/2030).

Bhandara Chinoor Dhan Utpadak Sangh from Pauni, proposed the GI registration of Bhandara Chinoor rice. After filing the application in May 2020, the rice was granted the GI tag in 2023 by the Geographical Indication Registry in Chennai, making the name "Bhandara Chinoor Rice" exclusive to the rice grown in the region. It thus became the third rice variety from Maharashtra and the 35th type of goods from Maharashtra to earn the GI tag.

The GI tag protects the rice from illegal selling and marketing, and gives it legal protection and a unique identity.

== See also ==
- Bhandara Taluka
