= Nagpur division =

Nagpur Division
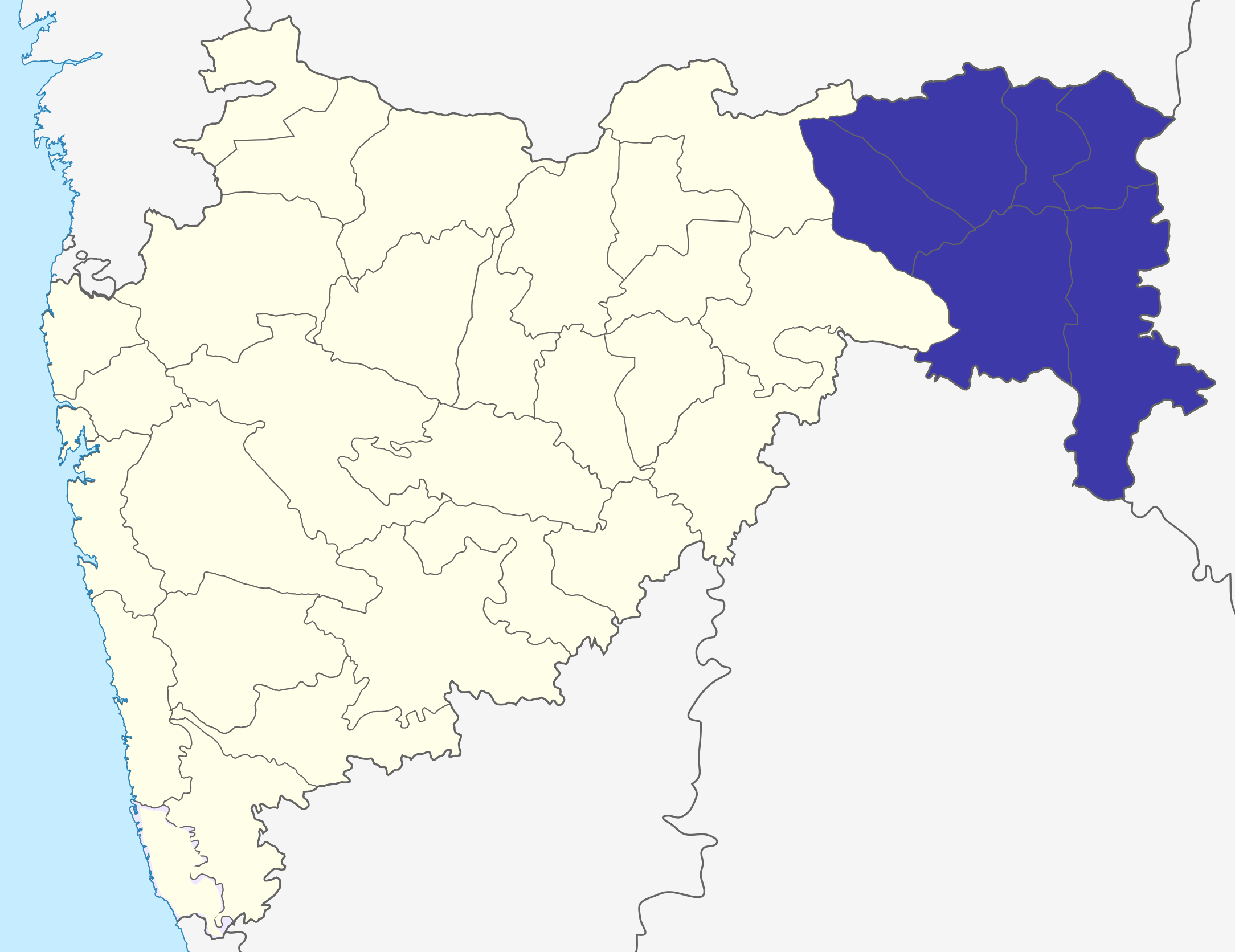
- Location of Nagpur Division in Maharashtra
- Coordinates: 21°09′36″N 79°04′48″E
- Country: India
- State: Maharashtra
- Districts: 1. Bhandara, 2. Chandrapur, 3. Gadchiroli, 4. Gondia, 5. Nagpur, 6. Wardha

Government
  - Commissioner Nagpur Division: Vijayalakshmi Bidari IAS
  - Police Commissioner Nagpur Division: NA
  - All Guardian Minister Nagpur Division: Dr. Nitin Kashinath Raut; (Nagpur District): Vishwajeet Kadam; (Bhandara District): Vijay Namdevrao Wadettiwar; (Chandrapur District): Vijay Namdevrao Wadettiwar Additional charge; (Gadchiroli District): Prajakt Tanpure Additional Charge; (Gondia District): Sunil Chhatrapal Kedar; (Wardha District)
  - All District Collector's Nagpur Division: Mr. Dr. Vipin Itankar (IAS); (Nagpur District): Mr. Sandeep Kadam (IAS); (Bhandara District): Mr. Ajay Gulhane (IAS); (Chandrapur District): Mr. Sanjay Meena (IAS); (Gadchiroli District): Mrs. Nayana A. Gunde (IAS); (Gondia District): Mr. Prerna Deshbhratar, (IAS); (Wardha District)
  - All MP's Nagpur Division: NA

Area
  - Total: 51,336 km^{2} (19,821 sq mi)
  - Under irrigation: 4,820 km^{2} (1,860 sq mi)

Population (2011)
  - Total: 11,754,434

GDP (Nominal, 2024)
  - Total: ₹3.78 trillion (US$51.07 billion)
  - Per capita: ₹249,703 (US$3,369.83)

The Nagpur Division also known as Vidarbha Division is one of six administrative divisions of the state of Maharashtra in India. Nagpur is the easternmost division in the state, with an administrative headquarters in the city of Nagpur. It covers 51,336 km² (19,821 mi²). The Amravati and Nagpur divisions make up the Vidarbha region.

Two airports, Dr. Babasaheb Ambedkar International Airport and Gondia Airport, are located here.

== History ==
Nagpur Division was created in 1861, when the Central Provinces administrative division of British India was created by merging the Nagpur Province and the Saugor and Nerbudda Territories. Before 1861, Nagpur Division had been part of Nagpur Province, which had been created after the Nagpur kingdom was annexed by the British in 1853 by means of the Doctrine of lapse. The British Nagpur Division included the current districts as well as Balaghat District, currently part of Madhya Pradesh.

After Indian Independence, The Central Provinces and Berar (Nagpur and Amravati divisions) became the new state of Madhya Pradesh. The Indian states were reorganised along linguistic lines in 1956, and on 1 November, Nagpur and Amravati divisions were transferred to Bombay State, while Balaghat District remained in Madhya Pradesh. The Marathi-speaking portion of Bombay State became Maharashtra in 1960.

== Demographics ==
As per the 2011 Census of India, Amravati Division had a population of 11,258,117 in the year 2011.

=== Languages ===
Marathi is the most spoken language, which is also the sole official language of the region. There are significant minorities of Hindi speakers and speakers of tribal languages in Nagpur Division.

=== Religion ===
At the time of the 2011 Census of India, 80.14% of the population of Nagpur Division followed Hinduism, 12.70% Buddhism, 5.19% Islam, 0.47% Christianity and the remaining 1.50% of the population followed other religions or stated no religion.

Religion in Nagpur Division (2011)
1. Hinduism (80.1%)
2. Buddhism (12.7%)
3. Islam (5.19%)
4. Christianity (0.47%)
5. Other or not stated (1.50%)

== Administration, Districts, and Talukas ==
Nagpur Division has 6 districts. Following table shows the districts of Nagpur Division and their talukas:

Districts, Sub-Divisions and Talukas in Nagpur Division
Name of Division (Headquarter)	Sr. No.	Districts	Administration	Sub-Division	Taluka	Source
Nagpur Division; HQ=Nagpur; Districts=6; SubDivisions=31; Talukas=64	1.	Bhandara district	HQ-Bhandara; Sub-Divisions-3; Taluka-7	Bhandara	Bhandara; Pauni	District website
Nagpur Division; HQ=Nagpur; Districts=6; SubDivisions=31; Talukas=64	1.	Bhandara district	HQ-Bhandara; Sub-Divisions-3; Taluka-7	Tumsar	Tumsar; Mohadi	District website
Nagpur Division; HQ=Nagpur; Districts=6; SubDivisions=31; Talukas=64	1.	Bhandara district	HQ-Bhandara; Sub-Divisions-3; Taluka-7	Sakoli	Sakoli; Lakhni; Lakhandur	District website
Nagpur Division; HQ=Nagpur; Districts=6; SubDivisions=31; Talukas=64	2.	Chandrapur District	HQ-Chandrapur; Sub-Divisions-8; Taluka-15	Chandrapur	Chandrapur	District website
Nagpur Division; HQ=Nagpur; Districts=6; SubDivisions=31; Talukas=64	2.	Chandrapur District	HQ-Chandrapur; Sub-Divisions-8; Taluka-15	Ballarpur	Ballarpur	District website
Nagpur Division; HQ=Nagpur; Districts=6; SubDivisions=31; Talukas=64	2.	Chandrapur District	HQ-Chandrapur; Sub-Divisions-8; Taluka-15	Mul	Mul; Saoli	District website
Nagpur Division; HQ=Nagpur; Districts=6; SubDivisions=31; Talukas=64	2.	Chandrapur District	HQ-Chandrapur; Sub-Divisions-8; Taluka-15	Gondpimpri	Gondpimpri; Pomburna	District website
Nagpur Division; HQ=Nagpur; Districts=6; SubDivisions=31; Talukas=64	2.	Chandrapur District	HQ-Chandrapur; Sub-Divisions-8; Taluka-15	Warora	Bhadravati; Warora	District website
Nagpur Division; HQ=Nagpur; Districts=6; SubDivisions=31; Talukas=64	2.	Chandrapur District	HQ-Chandrapur; Sub-Divisions-8; Taluka-15	Chimur	Chimur; Sindewahi	District website
Nagpur Division; HQ=Nagpur; Districts=6; SubDivisions=31; Talukas=64	2.	Chandrapur District	HQ-Chandrapur; Sub-Divisions-8; Taluka-15	Rajura	Rajura; Korpana; Jivati	District website
Nagpur Division; HQ=Nagpur; Districts=6; SubDivisions=31; Talukas=64	2.	Chandrapur District	HQ-Chandrapur; Sub-Divisions-8; Taluka-15	Bramhapuri	Nagbhid; Bramhapuri	District website
Nagpur Division; HQ=Nagpur; Districts=6; SubDivisions=31; Talukas=64	3.	Gadchiroli District	HQ-Gadchiroli; Sub-Divisions-6; Taluka-12	Gadchiroli	Gadchiroli; Dhanora	District website
Nagpur Division; HQ=Nagpur; Districts=6; SubDivisions=31; Talukas=64	3.	Gadchiroli District	HQ-Gadchiroli; Sub-Divisions-6; Taluka-12	Chamorshi	Chamorshi; Mulchera	District website
Nagpur Division; HQ=Nagpur; Districts=6; SubDivisions=31; Talukas=64	3.	Gadchiroli District	HQ-Gadchiroli; Sub-Divisions-6; Taluka-12	Aheri	Aheri; Sironcha	District website
Nagpur Division; HQ=Nagpur; Districts=6; SubDivisions=31; Talukas=64	3.	Gadchiroli District	HQ-Gadchiroli; Sub-Divisions-6; Taluka-12	Etapalli	Etapalli; Bhamragad	District website
Nagpur Division; HQ=Nagpur; Districts=6; SubDivisions=31; Talukas=64	3.	Gadchiroli District	HQ-Gadchiroli; Sub-Divisions-6; Taluka-12	Desaiganj/(Wadasa)	Desaiganj (Wadsa); Armori	District website
Nagpur Division; HQ=Nagpur; Districts=6; SubDivisions=31; Talukas=64	3.	Gadchiroli District	HQ-Gadchiroli; Sub-Divisions-6; Taluka-12	Kurkheda	Kurkheda; Korchi	District website
Nagpur Division; HQ=Nagpur; Districts=6; SubDivisions=31; Talukas=64	4.	Gondia District	HQ-Gondia; Sub-Divisions-4; Taluka-8	Gondia	Gondia	District website
Nagpur Division; HQ=Nagpur; Districts=6; SubDivisions=31; Talukas=64	4.	Gondia District	HQ-Gondia; Sub-Divisions-4; Taluka-8	Tiroda	Goregaon; Tirora	District website
Nagpur Division; HQ=Nagpur; Districts=6; SubDivisions=31; Talukas=64	4.	Gondia District	HQ-Gondia; Sub-Divisions-4; Taluka-8	Deori	Deori; Amgaon; Salekasa	District website
Nagpur Division; HQ=Nagpur; Districts=6; SubDivisions=31; Talukas=64	4.	Gondia District	HQ-Gondia; Sub-Divisions-4; Taluka-8	Arjuni Morgaon	Arjuni Morgaon; Sadak Arjuni	District website
Nagpur Division; HQ=Nagpur; Districts=6; SubDivisions=31; Talukas=64	5.	Nagpur District	HQ-Nagpur; Sub-Divisions-7; Taluka-14	Nagpur City	Nagpur	District website
Nagpur Division; HQ=Nagpur; Districts=6; SubDivisions=31; Talukas=64	5.	Nagpur District	HQ-Nagpur; Sub-Divisions-7; Taluka-14	Nagpur Rural	Nagpur (Rural); Hingna	District website
Nagpur Division; HQ=Nagpur; Districts=6; SubDivisions=31; Talukas=64	5.	Nagpur District	HQ-Nagpur; Sub-Divisions-7; Taluka-14	Mauda	Mauda; Kamthi	District website
Nagpur Division; HQ=Nagpur; Districts=6; SubDivisions=31; Talukas=64	5.	Nagpur District	HQ-Nagpur; Sub-Divisions-7; Taluka-14	Umred	Umred; Bhiwapur; Kuhi	District website
Nagpur Division; HQ=Nagpur; Districts=6; SubDivisions=31; Talukas=64	5.	Nagpur District	HQ-Nagpur; Sub-Divisions-7; Taluka-14	Ramtek	Ramtek; Parseoni	District website
Nagpur Division; HQ=Nagpur; Districts=6; SubDivisions=31; Talukas=64	5.	Nagpur District	HQ-Nagpur; Sub-Divisions-7; Taluka-14	Saoner	Saoner; Kalameshwar	District website
Nagpur Division; HQ=Nagpur; Districts=6; SubDivisions=31; Talukas=64	5.	Nagpur District	HQ-Nagpur; Sub-Divisions-7; Taluka-14	Katol	Katol; Narkhed	District website
Nagpur Division; HQ=Nagpur; Districts=6; SubDivisions=31; Talukas=64	6.	Wardha District	HQ-Wardha; Sub-Divisions-3; Taluka-8	Wardha	Wardha; Deoli; Seloo	District website
Nagpur Division; HQ=Nagpur; Districts=6; SubDivisions=31; Talukas=64	6.	Wardha District	HQ-Wardha; Sub-Divisions-3; Taluka-8	Arvi	Arvi; Ashti; Karanja	District website
Nagpur Division; HQ=Nagpur; Districts=6; SubDivisions=31; Talukas=64	6.	Wardha District	HQ-Wardha; Sub-Divisions-3; Taluka-8	Hinganghat	Hinganghat; Samudrapur	District website
	Total Districts = 6			Total Sub-Divisions = 31	Total Talukas = 64	

== See also ==
- Make In Maharashtra
- Central Provinces, Administration
- Nagpur Province
