= List of talukas in Chandrapur district =

List of talukas in Chandrapur district, Maharashtra India. 15 talukas of Chandrapur district.

== List of talukas in Chandrapur district ==
1. Chandrapur
2. Bhadravati
3. Warora
4. Chimur
5. Nagbhid
6. Bramhapuri
7. Sindewahi
8. Mul
9. Saoli
10. Gondpimpri
11. Rajura
12. Korpana
13. Pomburna
14. Ballarpur
15. Jivati

== See also ==
Chandrapur district

List of talukas of Maharashtra
