= Major State Highway 9 (Maharashtra) =

Road in Maharashtra, India

Major State Highway 9

Route information
- Maintained by MSRDC
- Length: 187 km (116 mi)

Major junctions
- North end: Nagpur, Nagpur
- South end: Chandrapur, Chandrapur

Location
- Country: India
- State: Maharashtra
- Districts: Nagpur, and Chandrapur
- Primary destinations: Nagpur, Umred, Nagbhid, and Chandrapur

Highway system
- Roads in India; Expressways; National; State; Asian; State Highways in Maharashtra

Maharashtra Major State Highway 9 also MSH 9 is a Major State Highway that runs south through Nagpur, and Chandrapur districts in the state of Maharashtra. This state highway touches numerous cities and villages VIZ. Nagpur, Umred, Nagbhid, Mul and Chandrapur. Tadoba Andhari Tiger Project and Umred Karhandla Wildlife Sanctuary are along with this highway.

== Summary ==
This highway is one of the important highway in Maharashtra state for transportation. Most of the part is passing through the forest area.

== Route description ==
Below is the brief summary of the route followed by this state highway.

=== Nagpur District ===
This highway starts off from intersection of Great Nag Road at Samrat Ashoka Square in Nagpur city and proceeds south west towards Umred city in Umred taluka and enter in Bhivapur taluka until Chandrapur district.

=== Chandrapur District ===
This highway proceeds south towards Nagbhid city in Nagbhid taluka and enter in Chimur taluka, Mul taluka proceeds west towards Chandrapur city.

== Major junctions ==
=== National highways ===
Also National Highway 353D (India)

1. Outer Ring Road, Nagpur which provide connectivity to National Highway 53 (India, old numbering), NH-7 and NH 47 near Vhirgoan village.

=== State highways ===
State Highway SH 3 Near NH44.

== Connections ==
Many villages, cities and towns in various districts are connected by this state highway.

== See also ==
- List of state highways in Maharashtra
