= National Highway 353D (India) =

National highway in India

National Highway 353D
- National Highway highlighted in red

Route information
- Auxiliary route of NH 53
- Length: 137 km (85 mi)

Major junctions
- North end: Nagpur
- South end: Armori

Location
- Country: India
- States: Maharashtra

Highway system
- Roads in India; Expressways; National; State; Asian
← NH 53	→ NH 353C

National Highway 353D, commonly called NH 353D is a national highway in India. It is a spur road of National Highway 53. NH-353D traverses the state of Maharashtra in India.

== Route ==
NH353D links Nagpur, Umred, Bhiwapur, Nagbhir, Bramhapuri and Armori in the state of Maharashtra.

== Junctions ==
NH 53 Terminal near Nagpur.
NH 247 near Umred.
NH 353E near Umred.
NH 247 near Nilaj.
NH 543 near Bramhapuri.
NH 353C Terminal near Armori.

== See also ==
- List of national highways in India
- List of national highways in India by state
