= Muktai Waterfall =

- Location within Maharashtra Location within India
- Location: Doma, Chandrapur, Maharashtra India
- Coordinates: 20°34′00″N 79°31′55″E
- Type: Plunge

Muktai Waterfall (Marathi: मुक्ताई धबधबा) is located in the forest of Doma village at Chimur Taluka of Chandrapur District in the state of Maharashtra.

It is one of the most popular waterfalls in Vidarbha, Maharashtra, India. This waterfall is known by the name of the Muktai temple located there and this waterfall flows down from the mountain area from a height of about 57 feet.

== Commutation ==
- Distance from Chimur: 22 km
- Distance from Chandrapur: 120 km
- Distance from Nagpur: 95 km
- Distance from Gondia: 169 km

=== Nearest airports ===
- Nagpur: International
- Gondia: Domestic

=== Nearest railway junctions ===
- Nagpur Junction railway station on Central Railway, 95 km away
- Chandrapur railway station on Central Railway, 122 km away
- Gondia Junction railway station on Central Railway, 169 km away
