= Nandigram Express =

Train in India

Overview
- Service type: Express
- Locale: Maharashtra & Telangana
- First service: 21 March 2007; 18 years ago
- Current operator: Central Railway

Route
- Termini: CSMT Mumbai (CSMT); Balharshah (BPQ)
- Stops: 27
- Distance travelled: 939 km (583 mi)
- Average journey time: 21 hours 10 minutes
- Service frequency: Daily
- Train number: 11001 / 11002

On-board services
- Classes: AC 2 Tier, AC 3 Tier, Sleeper Class, General Unreserved
- Seating arrangements: Yes
- Sleeping arrangements: Yes
- Catering facilities: On-board catering, E-catering
- Observation facilities: Large windows
- Baggage facilities: Available
- Other facilities: Below the seats

Technical
- Rolling stock: LHB coach
- Track gauge: 1,676 mm (5 ft 6 in)
- Operating speed: 110 km/h (68 mph) maximum, 48 km/h (30 mph) average including halts.

The 11001 / 11002 Nandigram Express is an express train belonging to Indian Railways that runs between CSMT Mumbai and Balharshah both railway stations in Maharashtra.

Before daily between CSMT and Nagpur Junction. After COVID-19 pandemic the train was terminated to Adilabad and then extended to Balharshah.

== Coaches ==
The 11001/11002 Nandigram Express presently has 1 AC 1st Class cum AC 2 tier, 1 AC 2 cum AC 3 tier, 2 AC 3 tier, 10 Sleeper class & 3 General Unreserved coaches 2 Guard cum Brake van. There is no pantry car attached but vendors are available.

As with most train services in India, coach composition may be amended at the discretion of Indian Railways depending on demand.

== Service ==
The 11001/11002 Nandigram Express covers the distance of 939 kilometres in 21 hours 10 mins (47 kmph (30 mph)) in from Mumbai to Ballarshah and in 21 hours 10 minutes (48 kmph (30 mph)) from Ballarshah to Mumbai.

== Route & halts ==
The train's halts are Mumbai CSMT, Dadar, Thane, Kalyan Junction, Igatpuri, Nahsik Road, Lasalgaon, Manmad Junction, Rotegaon, Lasur, Chhatrapati Sambhajinagar, Jalna, Partur, Selu, Parbhani Junction, Purna Junction, Hazur Sahib Nanded, Mudkhed Junction, Bhokar, Himayatnagar, Sahasrakund, Bodhadi Bujrug, Kinwat, Adilabad, Pimpal Khuti, Wani, Bhandak, Chandrapur, Balharshah.

== Traction ==
It is hauled by a Bhusawal Loco Shed based WAP-4 electric locomotive from CSMT Mumbai to Balharshah and vice versa.

== Timetable ==
- 11001 Nandigram Express leaves Mumbai CSMT every day at 16:35 hrs IST and reaches Balharshah at 13:45 hrs IST the Next Day.
- 11002 Nandigram Express leaves

Balharshah every day at 08:30 hrs IST and reaches Mumbai CSMT at 05:40 hrs IST the Next Day.

Station code	Station name	11001 – Mumbai CSMT to Ballarshah		Distance from source in km	Day	11002 –Ballarshah to Mumbai CSMT		Distance from source in km	Day
Station code	Station name	Arrival	Departure	Distance from source in km	Day	Arrival	Departure	Distance from source in km	Day
CSMT	Mumbai CSMT	Source	16:35	0	1	05:30	Destination	793	2
DR	Dadar	16:45	16:48	9	1	05:02	05:05	784	2
TNA	Thane	17:08	17:10	34	1	04:38	04:40	760	2
KYN	Kalyan Junction	17:27	17:30	54	1	04:17	04:20	740	2
IGP	Igatpuri	19:07	19:12	136	1	02:32	02:37	658	2
NK	Nasik Road	19:55	20:00	186	1	01:27	01:30	608	2
MMR	Manmad Junction	21:35	21:40	259	1	00:20	00:25	535	2
AWB	Chhatrapati Sambhajinagar	23:40	23:45	371	1	21:25	21:30	421	1
NED	Hazur Sahib Nanded	05:00	05:05	607	2	16:40	16:45	185	1

== Gallery ==
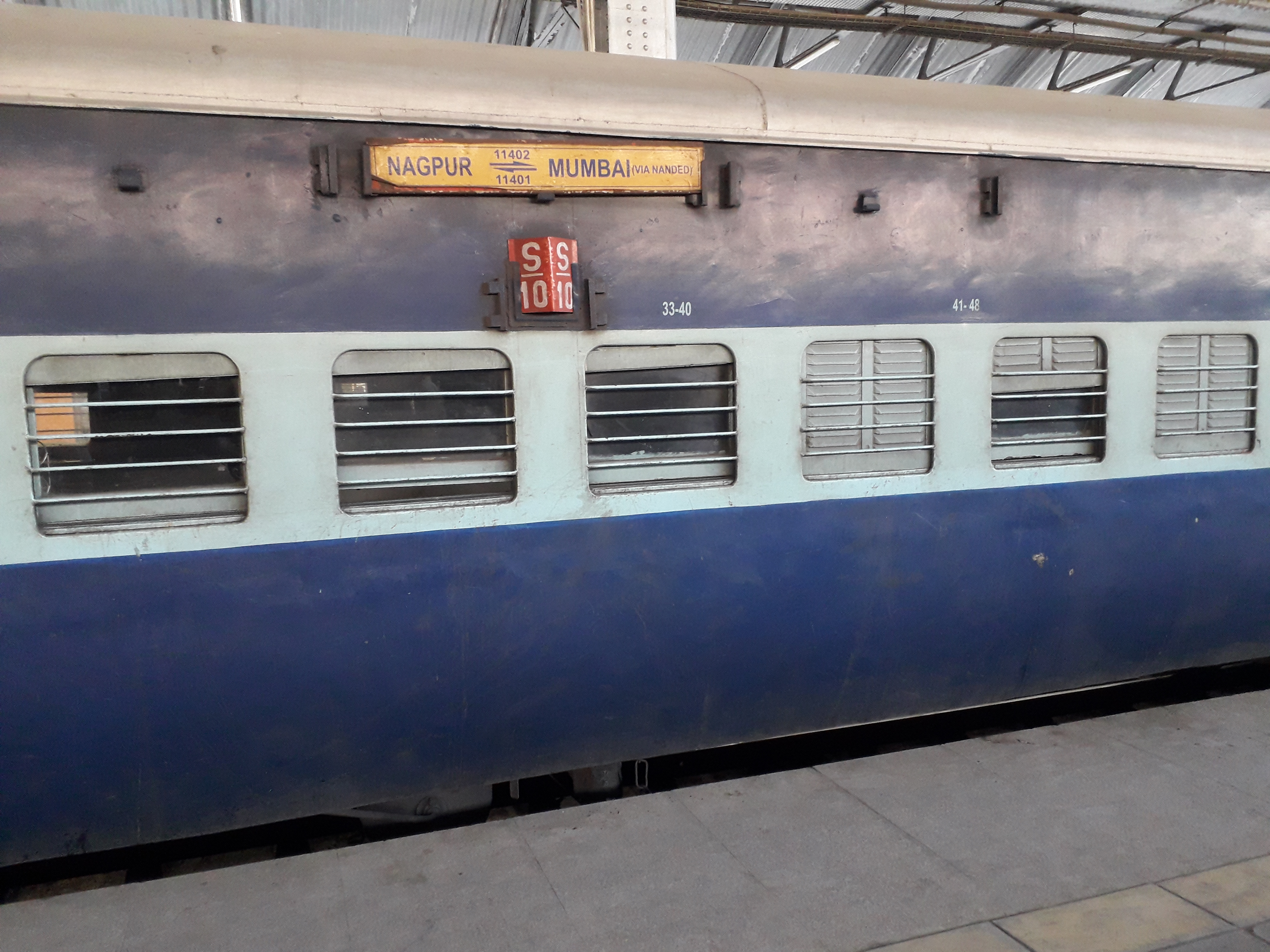
11401 Nandigram Express – Sleeper class coach

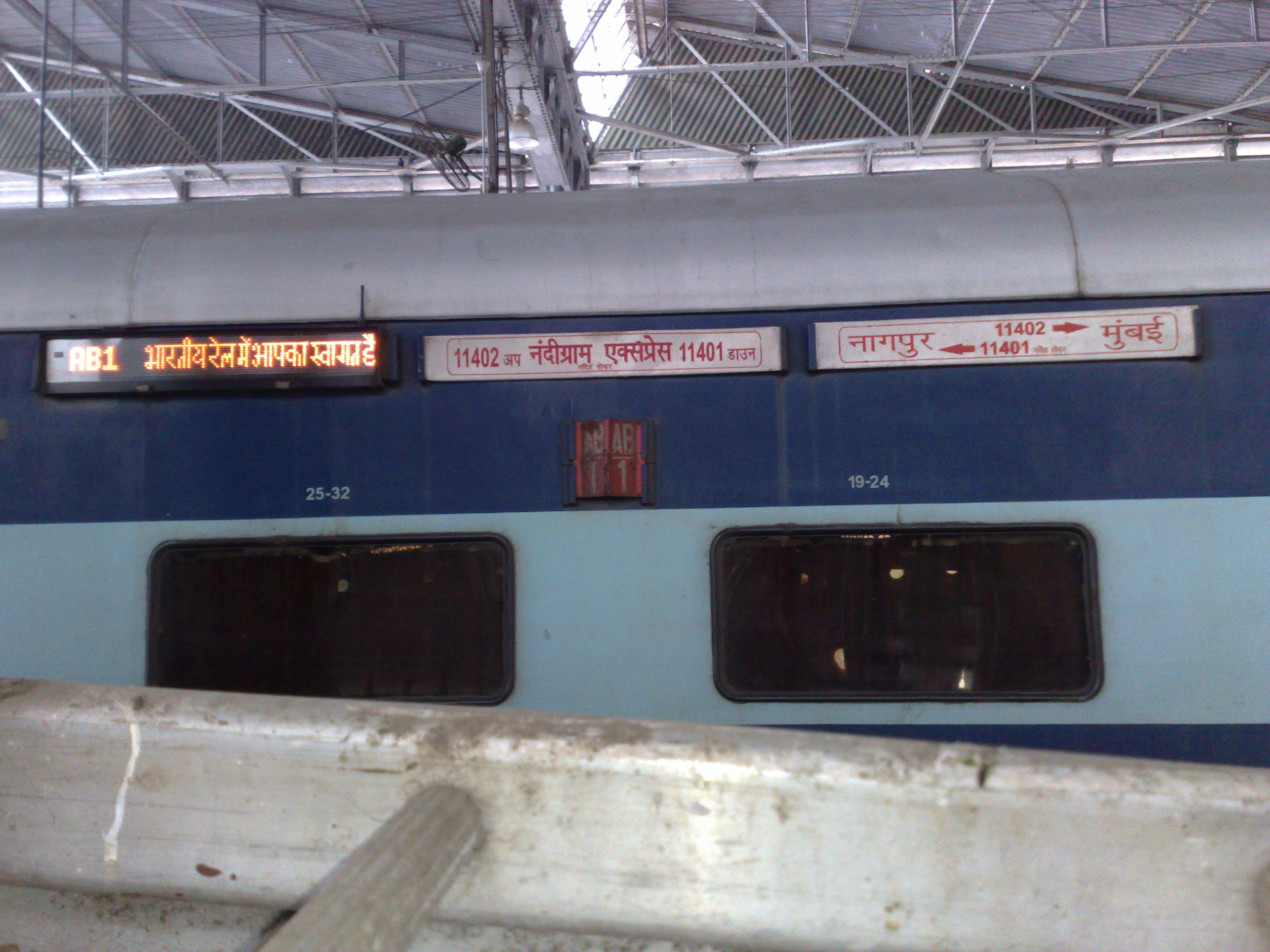
11401 Nandigram Express – Coach AB1

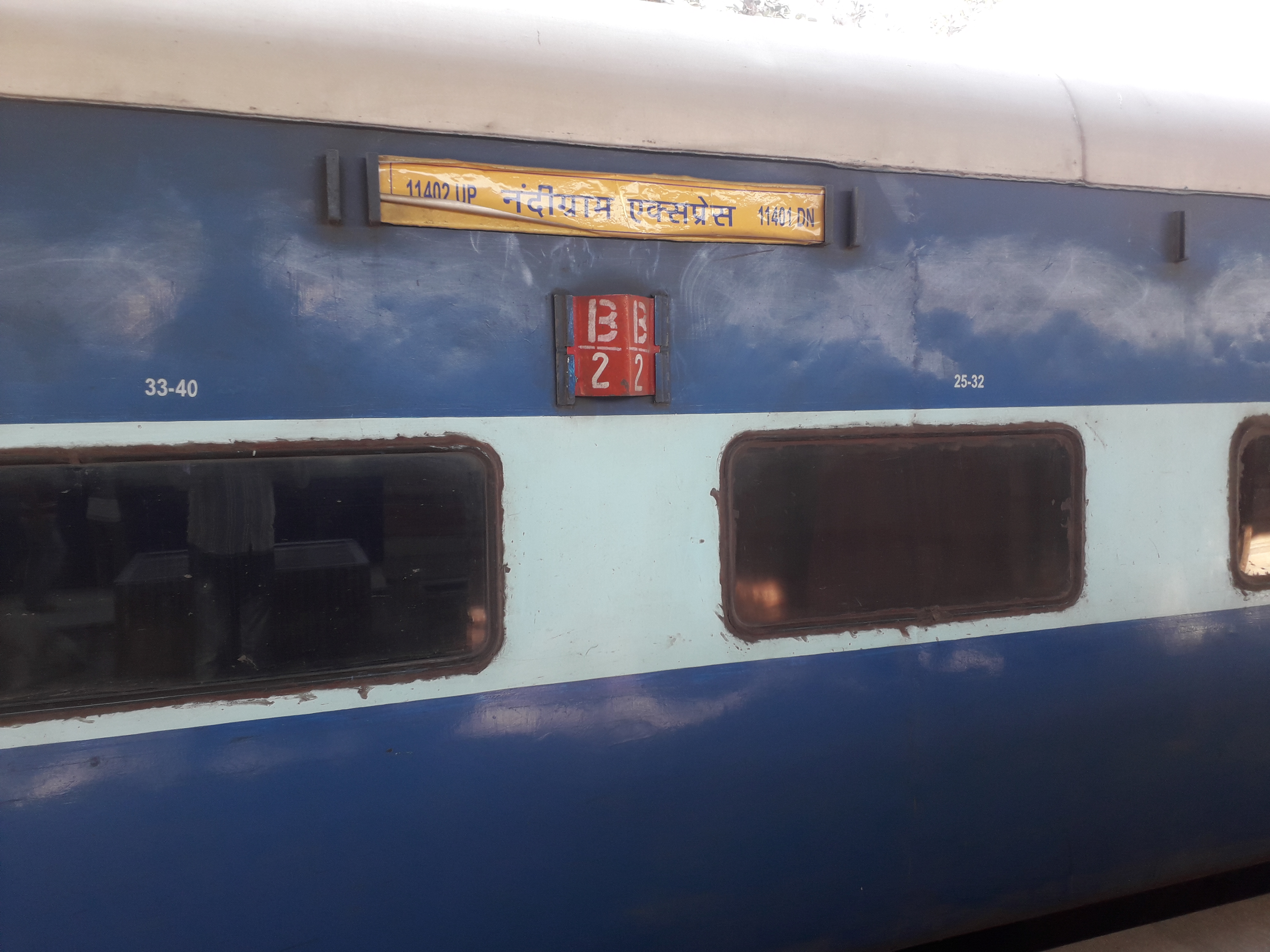
11401 Nandigram Express – AC 3 tier coach

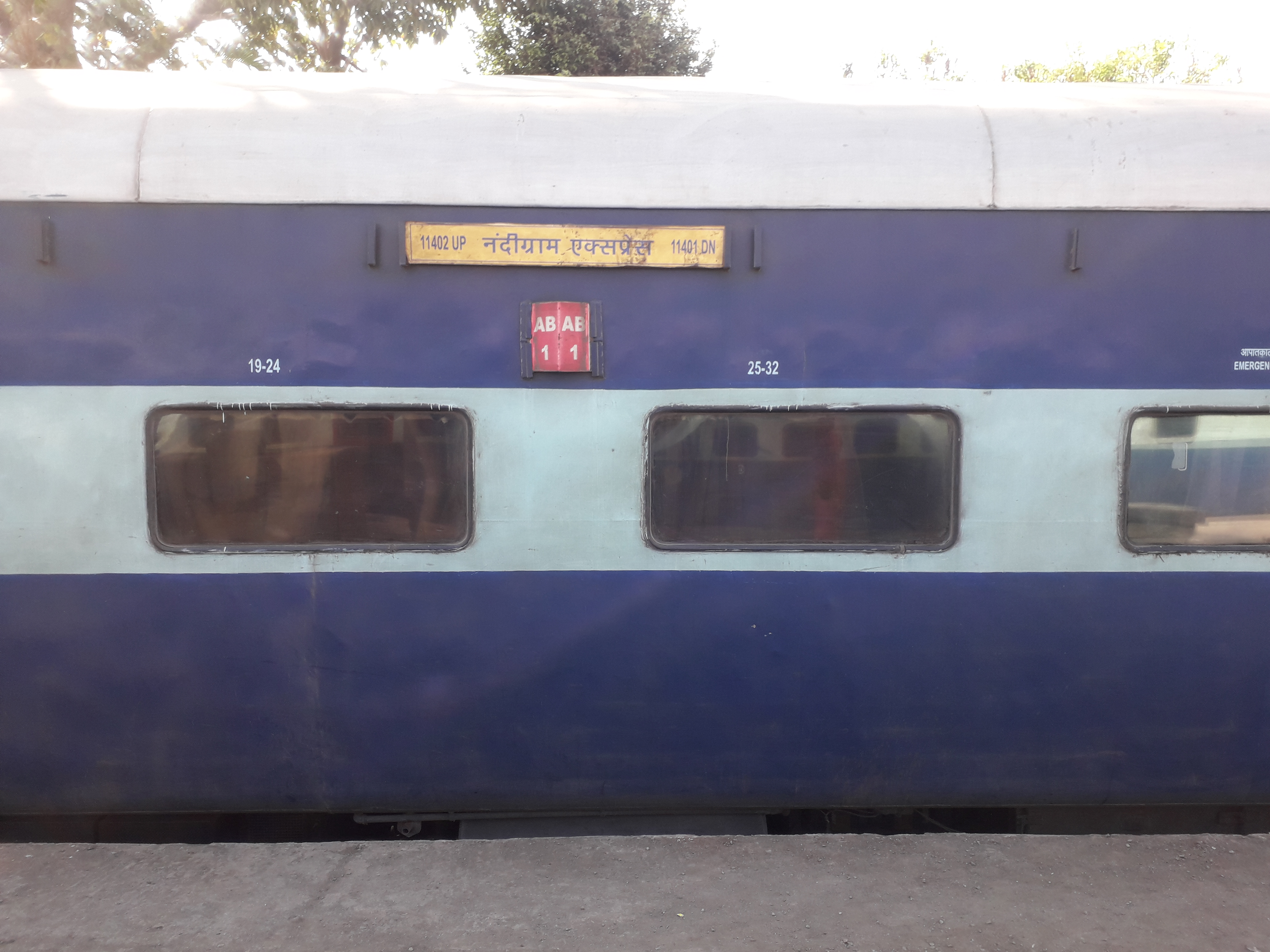
11401 Nandigram Express – AC 2 cum 3 tier coach

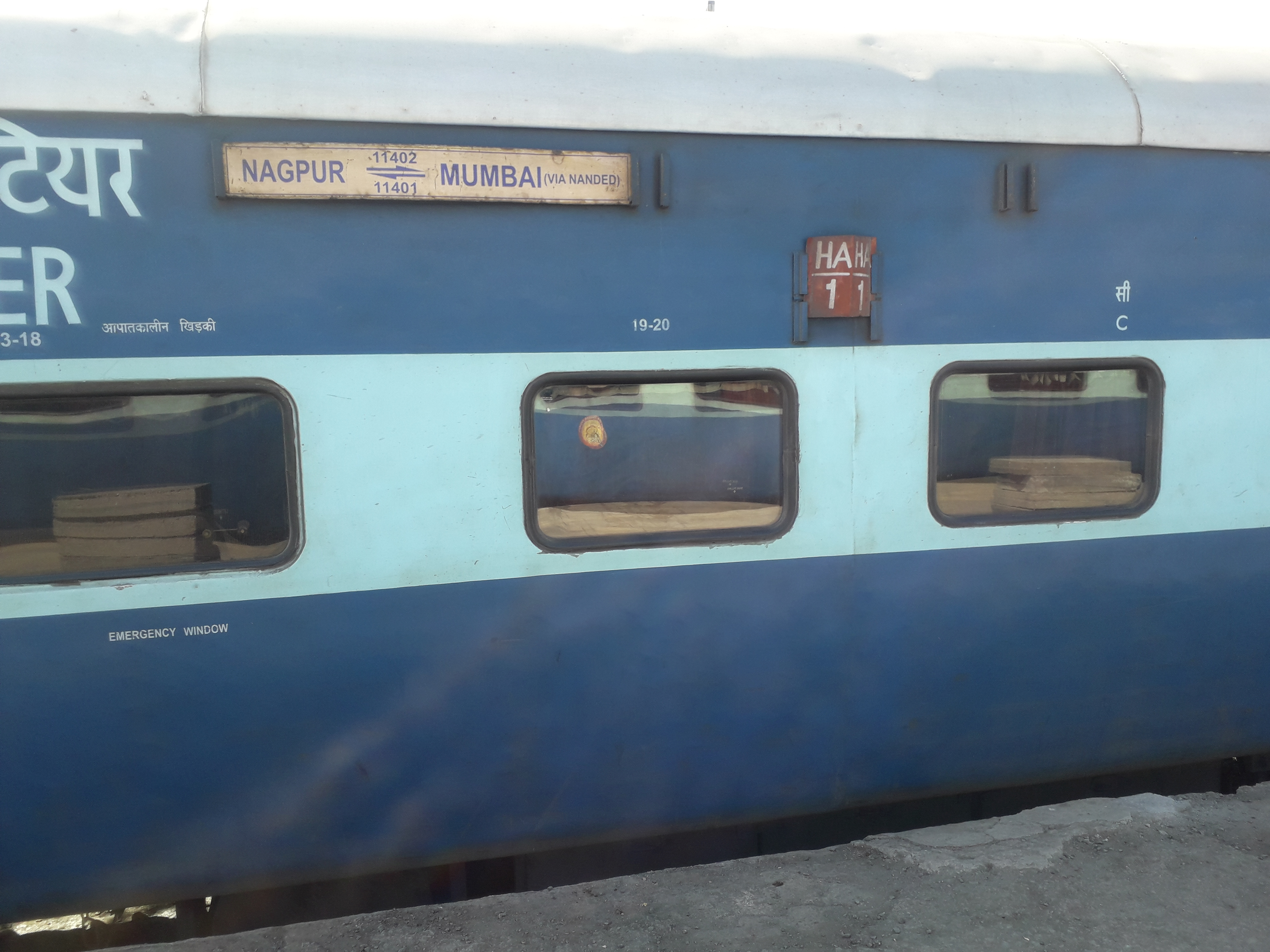
11401 Nandigram Express – AC 2 cum AC First Class coach

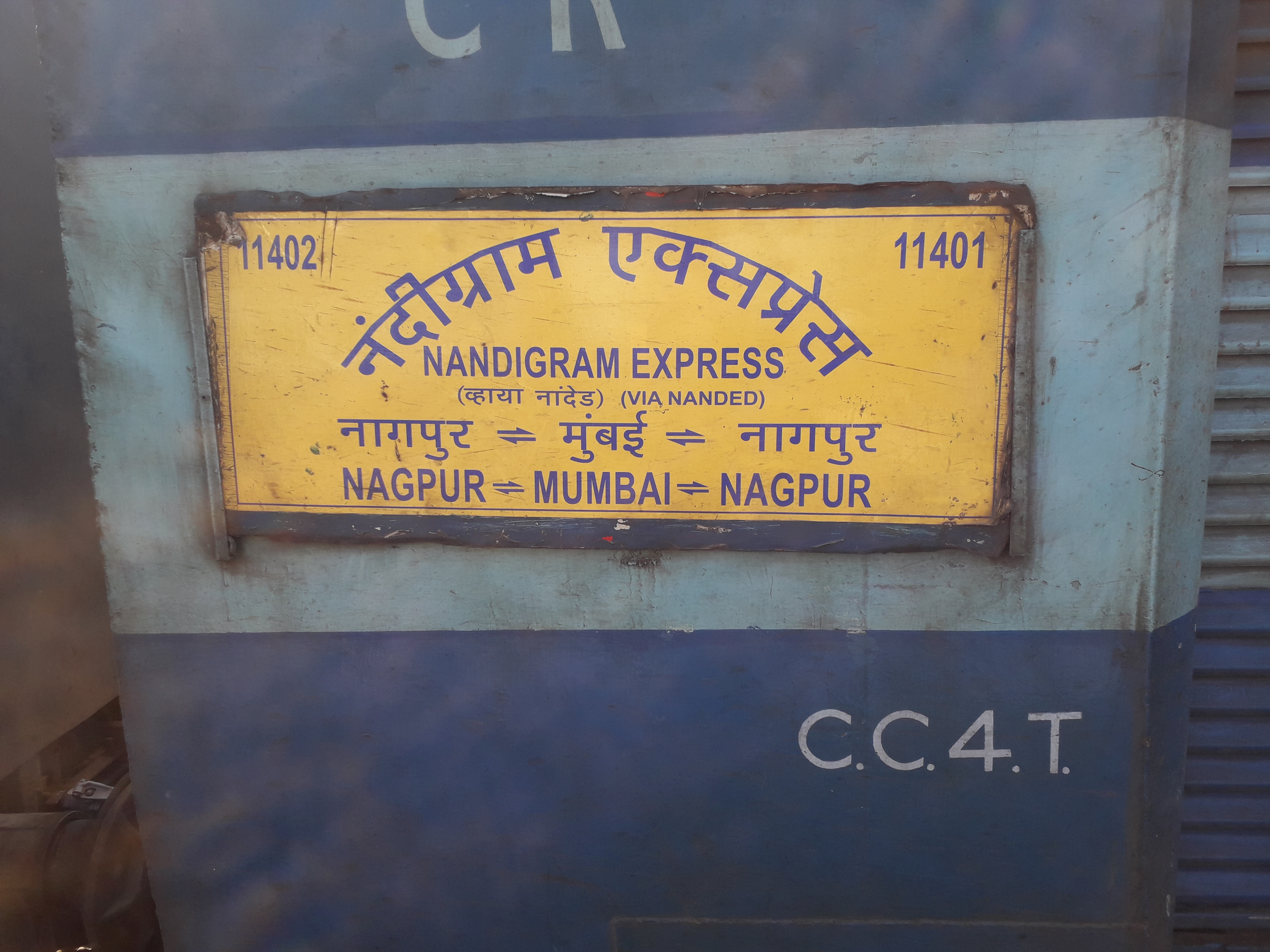
11401 Nandigram Express – Train board
