= Mudza =

Village in Maharashtra

- village
- Location in Maharashtra, India Mudza (India)
- Coordinates: 20.3203°N 79.9179°E
- Country: India
- State: Maharashtra
- District: Chandrapur

Government
  - Body: Gram panchayat

Population (2011)
  - Total: 3,659

Languages
  - Official: Marathi
- Time zone: UTC+5:30 (IST)
- PIN: 441206
- ISO 3166 code: IN-MH
- Vehicle registration: MH-34
- Website: maharashtra.gov.in

Mudza is a village in Bramhapuri tehsil of Chandrapur district in the state of Maharashtra, India. The village had a population of 3659 as on census of 2011.
