= Awalgaon =

Village in Maharashtra

Coordinates: 20.4059°N 79.9413°E

Awalgaon is a village in Bramhapuri taluk of Chandrapur district in India.

As of 2011, Awalgaon had 1064 families with a population of 4114, 2038 male and 2076 female.
