= National Highway 247 (India) =

National Highway in India

National Highway 247
- Map of National Highway 247 in red

Route information
- Auxiliary route of NH 47
- Length: 195 km (121 mi)

Major junctions
- West end: Dahegaon
- List: NH 47; NH 53; NH 53; NH 353D; NH 53; NH 753
- East end: Ramtek

Location
- Country: India
- States: Maharashtra

Highway system
- Roads in India; Expressways; National; State; Asian
← NH 47	→ NH 753

National Highway 247, commonly referred to as NH 247 is a national highway in India. It is a spur road of National Highway 47. NH-247 traverses the state of Maharashtra in India.

== Route ==
Dahegaon, Khaperkheda, Kamthi, Kuhi, Umred, Bhiwapur, Paoni, Adyal, Pahela, Bhandara, Ramtek.

== Junctions ==
NH 47 Terminal near Dahegaon.
NH 53 near Gumthala.
NH 53 near Wadoda.
NH 353D near Umred.
NH 353D near Bhiwapur.
NH 53 near Bhandara.
NH 753 Terminal near Ramtek.

== See also ==
- List of national highways in India
- List of national highways in India by state
