= Nagbhir Junction railway station =

Railway Station in Maharashtra, India

Nagbhir Junction
- Indian Railways logo

General information
- Location: Nagbhid, Chandrapur district, Maharashtra; India
- Coordinates: 19.9820°N 79.2792°E
- Elevation: 246 metres (807 ft)
- System: Indian Railways station
- Owner: Indian Railways
- Operator: South East Central Railways
- Lines: Gondia–Nagbhir–Balharshah line Nagpur–Nagbhir line
- Platforms: 2
- Tracks: 3

Construction
- Structure type: Standard (on-ground station)
- Parking: Yes

Other information
- Status: Functioning
- Station code: NAB
- Fare zone: South East Central Railway zone, Nagpur SEC railway division

Passengers
- 6000 Daily
Location
- Location within India Location within Maharashtra

Nagbhir Junction railway station (station code: NAB) is a junction railway station on Gondia–Nagbhir–Balharshah line and Nagpur–Nagbhir line in Nagpur SEC railway division of South East Central Railway Zone of Indian Railways. It serves Nagbhid town in Chandrapur district in Maharashtra state in India. It is located at 246 m above sea level and has two platforms. 12 trains stop at this station.

== History ==
The Gondia–Nagbhir–Nagpur line was opened for traffic in 1908. The Nagbhir–Rajoli line was opened in 1913 and extended up to Chanda Fort.

Work for conversion to broad gauge of the 240 km (149 mi) narrow-gauge Gondia–Chanda Fort line started in December 1992. The conversion was completed and the section re-opened on 2 July 1999. The Gondia–Nagbhir–Balharshah line was electrified in 2018. The doubling of this section is under process. The Nagpur–Nagbhir section is under conversion to broad gauge as of 2019. The electrification of the section is being done simultaneously.
