= Doma, Chandrapur =

Village in Maharashtra, India

Doma
- Village
- Location in Maharashtra, India Doma (India)
- Coordinates: 20.5806693°N 79.5052940°E
- Country: India
- State: Maharashtra
- Region: Vidharba
- District: Chandrapur
- Tahsil: Chimur

Government
  - Type: Gram Panchayat
  - Body: Doma Gram Panchayat

Area
  - Total: 1,472.95 ha (3,639.7 acres)
  - Land: 421 ha (1,040 acres)
- Elevation: 278 m (912 ft)

Population (2011)
  - Total: 2,298
  - Density: 104/km^{2} (270/sq mi)
- Demonym: Domawashi

Languages
  - Official: Marathi

Demographics
  - Literacy rate: 70.24%
- Time zone: UTC+5:30 (IST)
- PIN: 442903
- Area code: +91-7170
- Vehicle registration: MH-34

Doma (Marathi: डोमा) is a large village of Chimur Taluka in Chandrapur district of Maharashtra, India.

== Demographics ==
=== Population ===
As per the 2011 census of India, there are total 563 families residing in the village Doma. The total population of Doma is 2,298 out of which 1,153 are males and 1,145 are females. The Average Sex Ratio of Doma is 993.

The population of Children of age 0-6 years in Doma village is 228 which is 10% of the total population. There are 126 male children and 102 female children between the age 0-6 years. Thus as per the Census 2011 the Child Sex Ratio of Doma is 810 which is less than Average Sex Ratio (993) of Doma village.

As per the Census 2011, the literacy rate of Doma is 70.2%. Thus Doma village has lower literacy rate compared to 71.6% of Chandrapur district. The male literacy rate is 74.88% and the female literacy rate is 65.68% in Doma village.
