= Ravindra Bhusari =

Indian politician

Personal details
- Born: 17 June 1957 (age 68) Bramhapuri, Maharashtra, India
- Party: Bharatiya Janata Party
- Occupation: General Secretary (Organisation) - Maharashtra State BJP
- Website: www.mahabjp.org

Ravindra Yashwantrao Bhusari was the Maharashtra State General Secretary (Organisation) of Bharatiya Janata Party (BJP). He was the Pracharak (full-time propagator) of the Rashtriya Swayamsevak Sangh for western India and a former member of its National Executive.

== Early life ==
Born in the famous Bhusari family in Bramhapuri district of Maharashtra on 17 June 1957. His grandfather Late Advocate Bhaskarrao Bhusari was the Taluka Sanghchalak. His parents Ku. Suman Chawji & Sh. Yashwant Bhusari were married in 1950. Ravindra Bhusari has one elder brother Ram, eldest sister Rekha, younger sister Ranja & Youngest Sister Madhuri. He was a Sangh Swayamsewak since his childhood days. He is one of the top intellectuals associated with the RSS. His father was a farmer and based at Village Vasa, Gadchiroli. Primarily a student of commerce, he did his Post Graduate Degree in Commerce from Nagpur University, India.

== Education and early career ==
Bhusari family shifted to Nagpur for education of his 3 sisters. As a student in Dharampeth High-school, Nagpur, Bhusari represented the school in cricket, kabaddi, kho-kho, football and hockey. In 1976–77 he contested the Dharampeth College general secretary election and won the same with a huge margin. He completed his commerce degree from Nagpur University. He was also the cricket team captain of his college team. He was a college topper in the M.Com. Degree examination. In 1978–79 he was a part of the editors team of his college magazine. In 1979-81 he was appointed professor in Dharampeth College. He started his job as lecturer at the Dharampeth Arts and Commerce College. Bhusari's appointment as the Pradesh organizing secretary was formally announced at the 23 July state BJP working committee meeting held in Mumbai.

== Association with RSS ==
Bhusari's association with the Rashtriya Swayamsevak Sangh (RSS) goes back to his childhood days with the late Vilas Fadnavis. After resigning from the Professor's job, he formally volunteered to be a pracharak (full-time worker) for RSS in 1981. Since then Bhusari has been assigned to several key positions in the Vidarbha region, Western India region (Maharashtra, Gujarat, Goa) and, for the last few years, as the office secretary of the RSS headquarters in Nagpur. He also worked for some time in Akola region in Vidarbha.Ashokrao Dhole, Rameshrao Dahibhat, Karandikar Bapu, Shriram Punde were some local and close associates of Bhusari in Akola province. In 1993 he played a prominent role in organising the Deepawali program in Akola City. In 1998 he was one of the key organisers of the Vidarabha Region "Mahashibir" of 35000 RSS Swayamsewaks.

== Association with the BJP ==
Bhusari deputed to BJP in 2011 as State General Secretary Organisation by National President Shri. Nitin Gadkari.

As Maharashtra State General Secretary, Ravindra Bhusari was one of the few important people who led the BJP campaign in the state during the historic May 2014 Lok Sabha election followed by the Vidhan Sabha elections in October 2014. BJP stood victorious in both elections.

In 2015, Bhusari became a recipient of Nagpur Heroes Award and the following year had issued notices to authorities who violated National Green Tribunal Act.
