= Kondumal =

- Census town
- Location in Maharashtra, India
- Coordinates: 20.036°N 79.2902°E
- Country: India
- State: Maharashtra
- District: Chandrapur

Population (2001)
  - Total: 11,722

Languages
  - Official: Marathi
- Time zone: UTC+5:30 (IST)

Kondumal is a census town in Chandrapur district in the Indian state of Maharashtra.

== Demographics ==
As of 2001 India census, Kondumal had a population of 11,722. Males constitute 52% of the population and females 48%. Kondumal has an average literacy rate of 84%, higher than the national average of 59.5%: male literacy is 86%, and female literacy is 82%. In Kondumal, 13% of the population is under 6 years of age.

Year	Male	Female	Total Population	Change	Religion (%)							
Year	Male	Female	Total Population	Change	Hindu	Muslim	Christian	Sikhs	Buddhist	Jain	Other religions and persuasions	Religion not stated
2001	6089	5632	11721	-	77.408	2.918	1.254	0.111	17.294	0.307	0.452	0.256
2011	5405	5092	10497	-0.104	78.537	2.772	0.467	0.143	17.052	0.343	0.657	0.029
