= Bramhapuri taluka =

Bramhapuri Taluka
- Taluka
- Interactive map of Bramhapuri Taluka
- Coordinates: 20.5187702°N 79.515548°E
- Country: India
- State: Maharashtra
- District: Chandrapur district
- Headquarters: Bramhapuri Town

Area
  - Taluka: 814.75 km^{2} (314.58 sq mi)

Population (2011)
  - Taluka: 166,165
  - Density: 203.95/km^{2} (528.22/sq mi)
  - Urban: 36,025
  - Rural: 130,140

Demographics
  - Literacy rate: 70.02%
  - Sex ratio: 986

Bramhapuri Taluka, is a Taluka in Bramhapuri subdivision of Chandrapur district in Maharashtra State of India.

== Demographics ==
As per Indian government census of 2011, the population was 1,66,165.
