= Bhadravati =

Bhadravati may refer to:

- Bhadravati, Karnataka, an industrial city and taluk in India
- Bhadravati, Maharashtra (formerly Bhandak), a city and municipal council in India
