= Gadpipari =

Village in Maharashtra

- Village
- Location in Maharashtra, India Gadpipari (India)
- Coordinates: 20.6333°N 79.4000°E
- Country: India
- State: Maharashtra
- District: Chandrapur
- Elevation: 268 m (879 ft)

Languages
  - Official: Marathi
- Time zone: UTC+5:30 (IST)
- PIN: 44xxxx
- Telephone code: +91-07170
- Vehicle registration: MH-34

Gadpipari is a village and a Gram Panchayat in Chimur tahasil Chandrapur district. It is placed near Bhisi.
