= National Highway 353E (India) =

National highway in India

National Highway 353E
- Map of the National Highway in red

Route information
- Auxiliary route of NH 53
- Length: 90 km (56 mi)

Major junctions
- North end: Umred
- South end: Warora

Location
- Country: India
- States: Maharashtra

Highway system
- Roads in India; Expressways; National; State; Asian
← NH 353D	→ NH 347A

National Highway 353E, commonly called NH 353E is a national highway in India. It is a spur road of National Highway 53. NH-353E traverses the state of Maharashtra in India. Still not complete that project some contractor issues due to new tender cancelled in 14 Dec 2022

== Route ==
Umred, Bhisi, Chimur, Anandwan, Warora.

== Junctions ==
NH 353D Terminal near Umred.
NH 347A Terminal near Warora.

== See also ==
- List of national highways in India
- List of national highways in India by state
