= Mul, India =

Mul
- town
- Nickname: Mapari Cha Gav
- Location in Maharashtra, India
- Coordinates: 20.07°N 79.67°E
- Country: India
- State: Maharashtra
- District: Chandrapur

Government
  - Type: Municipal Council
  - Body: Mul Municipal Council
- Elevation: 198 m (650 ft)

Population (2011)
  - Total: 22,300

Languages
  - Official: Marathi
- Time zone: UTC+5:30 (IST)
- PIN: 441224
- Website: maharashtra.gov.in

Mul is a town and a municipal council in Chandrapur district in the Indian state of Maharashtra. Pincode of Mul is 441224.

== Geography ==
Mul is located at 20.09°N 79.67°E. It has an average elevation of 198 metres (649 feet).

Places to visit: Somnath is just 9 km away from Mul, well connected via road. Somnath is a well-known tourist place around Chandrapur district. Amtepharm is located in Somnath, which is run by Baba Amthe for leprotic patients.

There is also a ritual place known as markandadeo at about 25 km from mul. There is lord shiva Temple is situated in village at the bank of the Wainganga river, which flows generally from North to South but at Markanda it takes Northward turn for 20 km before again going Southward. It is believed that this uttar vahini (Northward flow) of wainganga river makes this place more sacred to worship lord shiva. A great yatra is heals here on occasion of mahashivratri and thousand of devotees gathers together to worship lord shiva.

Mul is mainly known for rice production, having 53 rice mills covering 90% of rice production in whole Chandrapur district, Maharashtra. Rice is supplied throughout Maharashtra involving big cities like Mumbai, Pune, Nagpur, Amravati, and Nashik.

Karmaveer College, located in Mul, offers Bachelor of Science degrees. Mul also has several CBSE schools.

== Demographics ==
As of 2001 India census, Mul had a population of 22,256. Males constitute 51% of the population and females 49%. Mul has an average literacy rate of 67%, higher than the national average of 59.5%: male literacy is 74%, and female literacy is 60%. In Mul, 13% of the population is under 6 years of age. Mul has very big area for MIDC; need to think about development of this area. Power plants are being constructed at MIDC area, near Maregaon. Those who are staying in Mul have struggled for higher studies; there are no colleges for B.Sc., Engineering.

Year	Male	Female	Total Population	Change	Religion (%)							
Year	Male	Female	Total Population	Change	Hindu	Muslim	Christian	Sikhs	Buddhist	Jain	Other religions and persuasions	Religion not stated
2001	11366	10964	22330	-	80.296	3.963	0.282	0.461	14.393	0.197	0.287	0.121
2011	12764	12685	25449	0.140	78.463	4.232	0.318	0.546	15.545	0.090	0.758	0.047

== Transport ==
Mul is connected to the district place Chandrapur by road. The MSRTC buses regularly ply to Chandrapur, Gadchiroli, Nagbhid, Nagpur, Saoli, Sindewahi. Mul is very well connected via train. Daily DMO runs between Chandrapur and Wadsa via Mul. Now people can enjoy long journey from Mul which connected to Bilaspur and Bangalore via weekly trains.
