= Chandrapur Ferro Alloy Plant =

Chandrapur Ferro Alloy Plant also known as Maharashtra Elektrosmelt Ltd (MEL), it became a Unit of SAIL in year 2011. Chandrapur Ferro Alloy Plant is the only Public sector Unit engaged in production of Manganese based Ferro Alloys in the Country. The plant is situated at Chandrapur (Maharashtra). It is located 166 km away from Nagpur on Delhi-Chennai rail route and is well connected by rail & road to the major cities of India.

CFP has an installed capacity of one lakh TPY Ferro Manganese. The product range of CFP includes High Carbon Ferro Manganese, Silico Manganese and Medium/Low Carbon Ferro Manganese. The Plant is accredited with Quality Assurance Certificate ISO 9001:2008.

CFP's major production facilities include two no of 33 MVA Submerged Electric Arc Furnaces for production of Ferro alloys, two Manganese Ore Sintering Plants, Furnace gas based Power Plant, Mechanized Crushing and Screening System for Ferro Alloys and 1 MVA Electric Arc Furnace for the production of Medium Carbon and Low Carbon Ferro Manganese with Lime Calcination and Manganese Ore Roasting Unit.

The plant is a leader in ferroalloy technology. Activities for technological developments are taken up in areas like raw material preparation, raw material substitution, furnace operation, ferroalloy casting and processing etc. One example of the latest technological development is the state of the art ‘Layer Casting Technology’ for casting molten Ferro Alloys and Ferro Alloy Processing Unit (Crusher) which is the first of its kind in India.

== Expansion ==
With an investment of around Rs 185 crores, a 45 MW Sub-merged Arc Furnace with a production capacity of around 90,000 tonnes of High Carbon Ferro Manganese or 70,000 tonnes of Silico Manganese is under construction. It is expected to be completed by 2015.

With an investment of 38 crores, a 4 MW (furnace gas based) Power Plant is also envisaged. In near future, for meeting the total power requirement of plant, a Captive Power Plant is also planned.
