= Gondpipari =

- town
- Location in Maharashtra, India
- Coordinates: 19°43′02″N 79°41′09″E
- State: Maharashtra

Government
  - Body: नगर पंचायत

Languages
  - Official: Marathi
- Time zone: UTC+5:30 (IST IST (UTC+5:30))
- Postal code: 442702

Gondpipari is a town and a tehsil in Chandrapur subdivision of Chandrapur district in Nagpur division in the Vidarbha region in the state of Maharashtra, India.

Year	Male	Female	Total Population	Change	Religion (%)							
Year	Male	Female	Total Population	Change	Hindu	Muslim	Christian	Sikhs	Buddhist	Jain	Other religions and persuasions	Religion not stated
2011	4302	4172	8474	-	82.228	3.092	0.201	0.130	11.695	0.578	2.053	0.024
