= Bhiwapur =

- town
- Location in Maharashtra, India
- Coordinates: 20°50′08″N 79°30′04″E
- Country: India
- State: Maharashtra
- Region: Vidarbha
- District: Nagpur

Population
  - Total: 18,000

Languages
  - Official: Marathi
- Time zone: UTC+5:30 (IST)
- PIN: 441201
- Telephone code: 07106
- Nearest city: Nagpur
- Literacy: 70 %
- Lok Sabha constituency: Ramtek
- Vidhan Sabha constituency: Umred

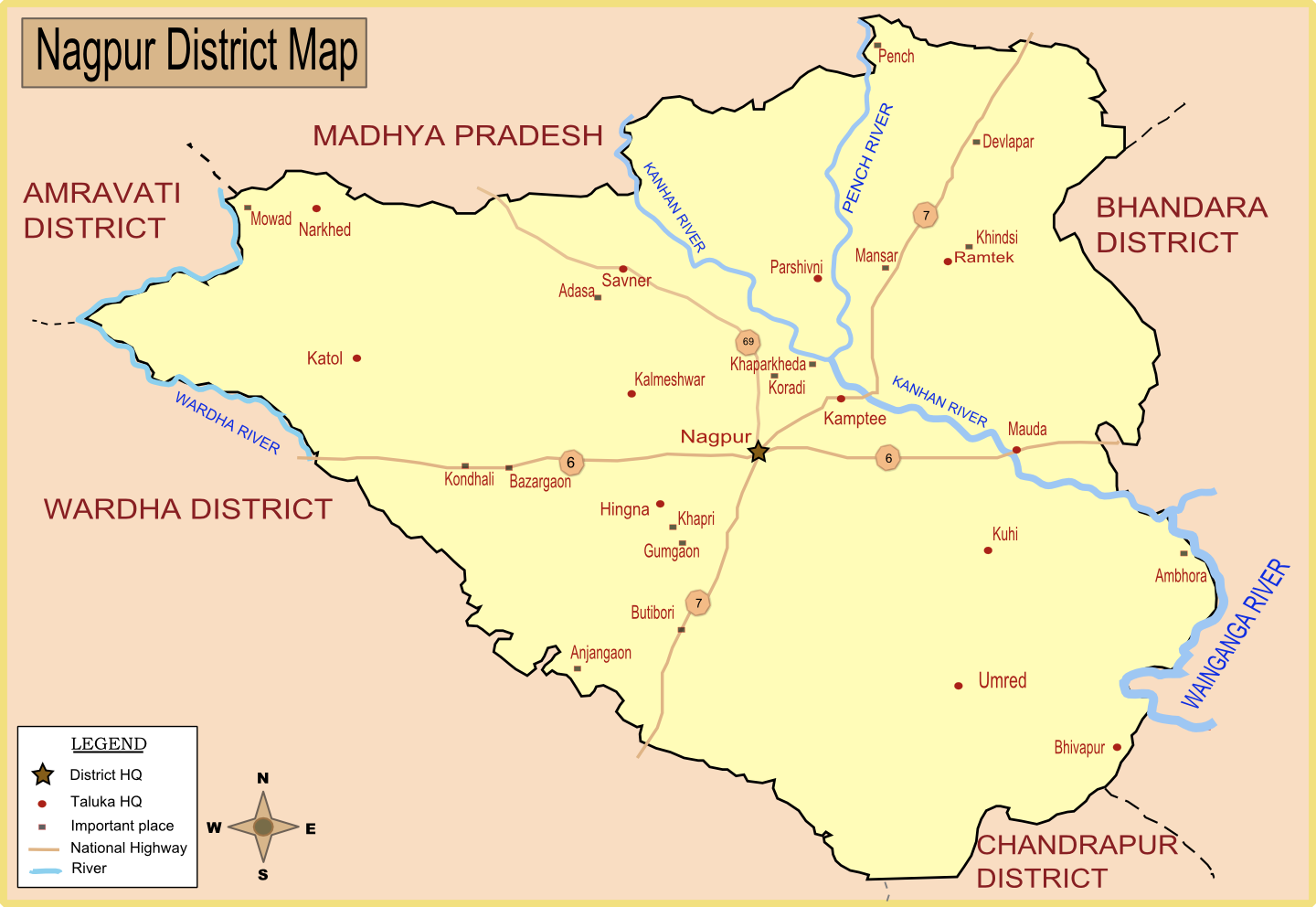
Map of Nagpur district showing location of Bhiwapur.

Bhiwapur is a town and a tehsil in Umred subdivision of Nagpur district in the Berar region in the state of Maharashtra, India.

== Demographics ==
As per Indian government census of 2011, the population was 81,519.

Year	Male	Female	Total Population	Change	Religion (%)							
Year	Male	Female	Total Population	Change	Hindu	Muslim	Christian	Sikhs	Buddhist	Jain	Other religions and persuasions	Religion not stated
2001	42337	40827	83164	-	78.996	0.998	0.114	0.166	19.329	0.160	0.183	0.054
2011	40978	40541	81519	-1.978	80.530	1.075	0.101	0.155	17.495	0.022	0.184	0.439
