= Pombhurna =

Pombhurna पोंभुर्णा
- Town & Taluka H.Q.
- Nickname: City of White House
- Interactive map of Pombhurna
- Country: India
- State: Maharashtra
- Established: 1999
- Named for: Forest Rest House

Government
  - Type: City Council
  - Body: Pombhurna Nagar Panchayat

Languages
  - Official: Marathi, Gondi
- Time zone: UTC+5:30 (IST)
- Postal code: 442403
- Vehicle registration: MH-34

Pombhurna is a town and a tehsil in Chandrapur subdivision of Chandrapur district in Nagpur revenue Division in the Berar region in the state of Maharashtra, India. Earlier this tehsil was under Gondpimpari Taluka prior to Split from Mul.

== History ==
Pombhurna Tahsil is formed in 1999.

== Education ==
- Secondary Education:

1) Z.P. School

2) Janata convent

4) Diamond Jubilee Convent

5) Pombhurna Public school

6) swami vivekananda public school Pombhurna

- Higher Education

1) Chintamani Commerce College (CCC)

2) Chintamani Science College

3) Shrikrushna Jr. Science, College

4) Janata College, Pombhurna
