= Jiwati =

- Town
- Nickname: The Lost Paradise
- Location in Maharashtra, India
- Coordinates: 19.60°N 79.06°E
- Country: India
- State: Maharashtra
- District: Chandrapur

Government
  - Type: Nagar Panchayat
  - Body: Jiwati Nagar Panchayat

Area
  - Total: 559 km^{2} (216 sq mi)
- Elevation: 186 m (610 ft)

Population (2011)
  - Total: 61,820
  - Rank: 15
  - Density: 111/km^{2} (286/sq mi)
- Demonym: Pahadavarche

Languages
  - Official: Marathi
- Time zone: UTC+5:30 (IST)
- Postal code: 442908
- ISO 3166 code: IN-MH
- Vehicle registration: MH 34

Jiwati is a town and a tehsil in Rajura subdivision of Chandrapur district in Nagpur revenue Division in the state of Maharashtra, India. 17 September is celebrated as Marathwada Liberation Day in Jiwati as well as Korpana and Rajura talukas. Manikgad fort is a tourist spot in Jiwati taluka which is 12 km away from taluka headquarters. Built by tribal Naga kings in the 9th century, the Manigarh hill fort stands at the height of 507 metres above sea-level. Nearby is an old temple of Vishnu. According to 2011 census the population of Jiwati town is 3,764 of which 1,888 are male and 1,876 are female.Jiwati town number of houses are 830. Female Population is 49.8%. town literacy rate is 66.9% and the Female Literacy rate is 29.4%.

Jiwati the name comes from Jivati the goddess who is said to protect a newborn child and is worshipped as Jivati or Jivantika in Maharashtra.

According to census 2011 information the sub-district code of Jiwati Block (CD) is 04076. Total area of jiwati tehsil is 559 km^{2}. Jiwati tehsil has a population of 61,820 people. Jiwati tehsil has a population density of 110.6 inhabitants per square kilometre. There are about 13,656 houses in the sub-district.

- There are about 82 villages in Jiwati tehsil. In addition to that 14 disputed villages are belong to Maharashtra, specially Jiwati tehsil.

== Geography and Demographics ==
Location: Jivati is situated in the eastern part of Maharashtra, in the Chandrapur district. It is known for its rural setting and natural beauty. Population: The tehsil has a diverse population, with a mix of various communities and tribes. Agriculture is a primary occupation for many residents.

== Economy and Lifestyle ==
Agriculture: The economy of Jivati primarily revolves around agriculture. Farmers in the region grow crops such as rice, wheat, soybeans, and various pulses.

- Forestry: The area is rich in forests, which contribute to the local economy through the collection of forest products like timber, bamboo, and medicinal plants.

Livelihood: Besides agriculture and forestry, people engage in small-scale businesses and local trades.

== Culture and Traditions ==
Festivals: Traditional festivals are celebrated with enthusiasm. Common festivals include Diwali, Holi, and various local tribal festivals. Language: Marathi, Gondi language, Banjara are the predominant language spoken in Jivati.

== Education and Infrastructure ==
Schools: There are several primary and secondary schools in the region, providing basic education to the children of Jivati. Healthcare: Healthcare facilities are basic, with primary health centers and a few clinics serving the local population. Transportation: The region is connected by road, but transportation infrastructure might not be as developed as in urban areas.

== Natural Environment ==
Forests and Wildlife: Jivati is surrounded by forests, which are home to a variety of flora and fauna. The natural environment is an important part of life in the region. Rivers and Water Bodies: Several rivers and streams flow through the area, contributing to the agricultural and daily needs of the residents.

== Disputes & Challenges ==
Development: Being a rural and relatively remote area, Jivati faces challenges related to infrastructure development, such as road connectivity, healthcare facilities, and educational institutions.

Economic Opportunities: Limited economic opportunities and employment options can be a concern, leading to migration to urban areas for better prospects.

- Disputed 12&half Villages on State Border, which includes 8 Revenue villages and 6 sub:
1. Kotha Bk, (Rith)
2. MaharajGuda (1/2),
3. Mukdam Guda
4. Paramdoli & (Tanda),
5. Palas Guda,
6. Lendijjala,
7. Lendi Guda,
8. Padmawati,
9. Yessapur,
10. Antapur,
11. Bhola-Pathar,
12. Shankar-Lodhi &
13. Indiranagar.

== Government and Administration ==
Local Governance: Jivati is governed by local bodies, including the tehsil office and gram panchayats (village councils), which manage administrative and developmental activities.

Development Programs: Various government programs aimed at rural development, agriculture, and social welfare are implemented to improve the living standards of the residents.

- Disputed 12&half Villages on State Border, which includes 8 Revenue villages and 6 sub:
1. Kotha Bk, (Rith)
2. MaharajGuda (1/2),
3. Mukdam Guda
4. Paramdoli & (Tanda),
5. Palas Guda,
6. Lendijjala,
7. Lendi Guda,
8. Padmawati,
9. Yessapur,
10. Antapur,
11. Bhola-Pathar,
12. Shankar-Lodhi &
13. Indiranagar.

== Movie ==
The Lost Paradise movie tells the story of Adivasis of Jiwati taluka who live in the far-flung corner of Maharashtra, on the edge of Telangana border. A neglected region for many decades, the Adivasis have suffered much and continue to do so as they lose land to strip mining, as crops fail and their culture is threatened.
