= Saoli =

Saoli Sawali
- Town
- Location in Maharashtra, India
- Coordinates: 20.0648°N 79.8017°E
- Country: India
- State: Maharashtra
- District: Chandrapur

Government
  - Type: Municipal Council
  - Body: Nagar Panchayat Saoli

Area
  - Town: 9 km^{2} (3.5 sq mi)
- Elevation: 190.5 m (625 ft)

Population (2011)
  - Town: 19,475
  - Density: 2,200/km^{2} (5,600/sq mi)
  - Metro: 154,963 (Tehsil)

Language
  - Official: Marathi
- Time zone: UTC+5:30 (IST)
- PIN: 441225
- Telephone code: 07174
- Vehicle registration: MH-34
- Nearest city: Gadchiroli, Chandrapur
- Lok Sabha constituency: Gadchiroli–Chimur (Lok Sabha constituency)
- Vidhan Sabha constituency: 73-Bramhapuri (Vidhan Sabha constituency)

Saoli is a town and a tehsil in Chandrapur subdivision of Chandrapur district in Nagpur revenue Division in the Berar region in the state of Maharashtra, India.
