= Bhadravati, Maharashtra =

Bhadravati Bhandak
- city
- Bhadravathi,Maharastra.
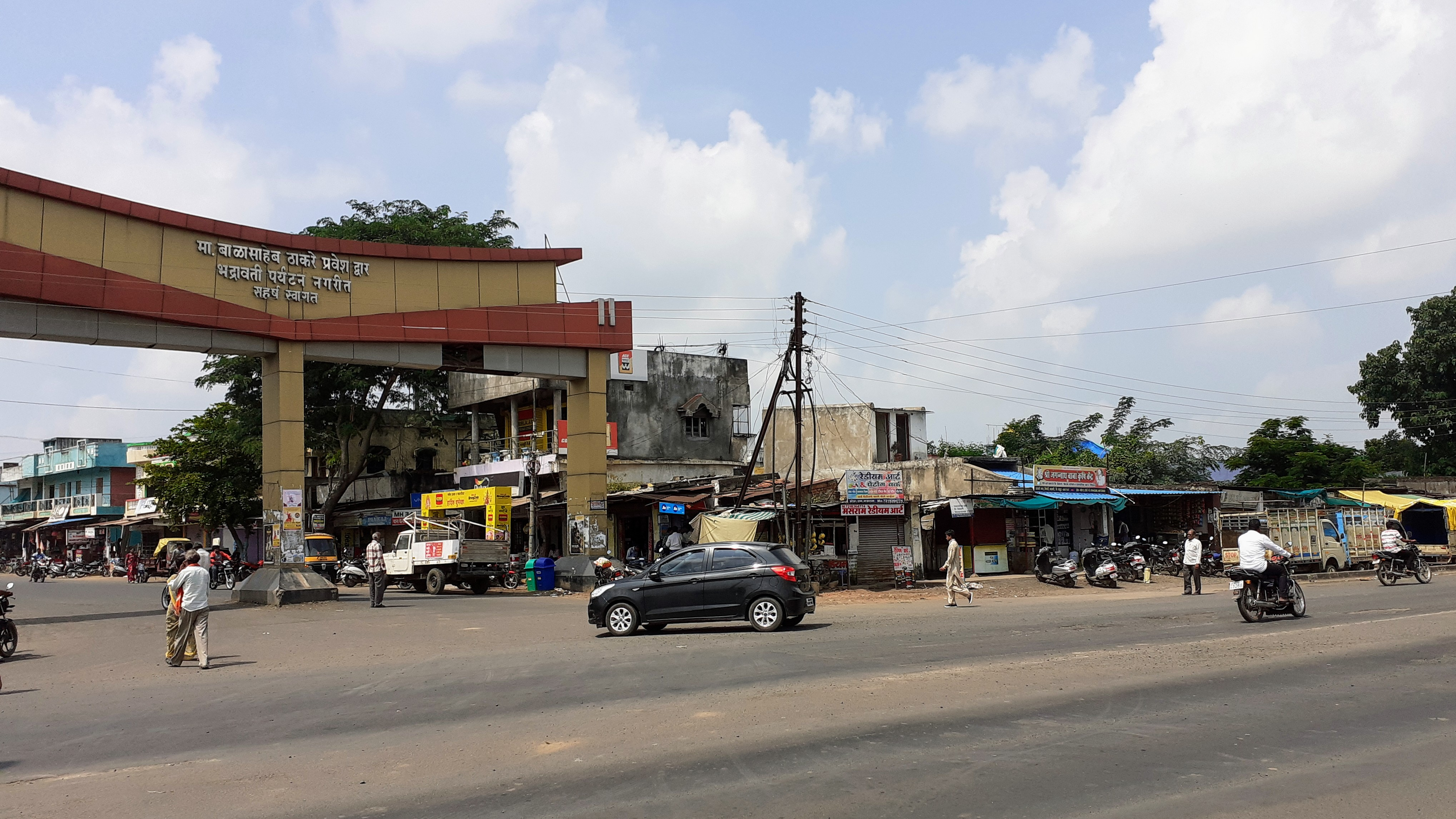
- Bhadravati
- Nickname: भांडक
- Location in Maharashtra, India
- Coordinates: 20°6′35″N 79°7′12″E
- Country: India
- State: Maharashtra
- District: Chandrapur

Government
  - Type: Municipal Council
  - Body: Bhadravati Municipal Council

Area
  - Total: 20 km^{2} (7.7 sq mi)

Population (2011(84,147) on next census( 2021) due to covid it was postponed)Reference Census 2011 Data - censusindia.gov.in
  - Total: 84,147
  - Rank: 3rd In Chandrapur District = 17 In Vidarbha
  - Density: 4,200/km^{2} (11,000/sq mi)

Languages
  - Official: Marathi
- Time zone: UTC+5:30 (IST)
- PIN: 442902
- Telephone code: +91 07175
- ISO 3166 code: IN-MH
- Vehicle registration: MH 34
- Website: maharashtra.gov.in

Bhadravati (formerly Bhandak) is a city and a municipal council in Chandrapur district in the state of Maharashtra, India. It lies 26 km from Chandrapur city. Bhadravati city has recently bagged the Best City in 'Innovation & Best Practices' award under the population Category - 50K to 1 Lakh from the Government of India under Swach Surverkshan Awards-2021. It has also bagged 8th Rank in being the cleanest city under category population Category - 50K to 1 Lakh under Swach Surverkshan Awards-2021 amongst 132 cities nominated.

Chandrapur district is famous for tribal folk dances such as Dandar, Gondi and Rela.Adiwasi folk dance in Diwali known as Dandar. Speciely in the respect of lord Krishna.

It has an ordnance factory and several open-cast coal mines.

== History ==
Gavrala, a small hamlet near Bhadravati, has been excavated by the Department of Ancient Indian History, Culture and Archeology, Nagpur during 2006–07. They have unearthed fortifications of the Vakataka period.

== Historic places ==
=== Bhadrawati Fort ===
The Bhadrawati Fort is located In heart of Bhadrawati City. This historical monument was made by the Gond king Bhankyasing across 3 acres of land. There is a big gate to the front of the fort, and all four sides are surrounded by huge walls. There is also a deep ancient well at the center of the fort. The locals say that the fort developed over 2000 years ago. Outside of the forth there are a few houses in which local residents live. Some structural stones are present in near area.

=== Bhadranag Mandir ===
The city has an ancient temple of Bhadranag a form of Lord Shiva, popularly known as Nagoba Mandir or Nag Mandir. It is visited by a large number of devotees on Mahashivratri and Nag-Panchami. This temple gives the city its name of Bhadravati.

=== Jain Mandir ===
There is Jain temple dedicated to 23rd Jain Tirthankar Parshvanath known as Kesariyaji Parshvanath located in Bhadravati. The temple belongs to Shwetamber sect of Jain religion.

=== Ganesh Temple ===
There is also a Ganesh temple at Gavrala and its architecture and archaeological remains refers the art of the late ancient historic period.

=== Vijasan Tekdi ===
There are 2000 years old Buddhist caves in Vijasan Tekdi at Vijasan village. These caves have hosted International Buddha Dhamma conventions. Several leaders and Monks of Buddha Dhamma from all over the world have represented at the convention.

=== Bhawani Mata Mandir ===
Bhawani Mata Mandir Is an ancient temple Located near Bhadranag Temple. this temple is Underground Temple in Special vocation Navratra And Astami This Place is Full Of Crowd.

=== Mahishasur Mardini Mandir ===
An Ancient temple Located On Vijasan Tekdi deoolwada road Bhadrawati This Place was huge Gathering in Navaratri.

=== Chandika Mata Mandir ===
This Ancient temple Is located behind Jain Temple. There are ancient structures around the Temple.

== Religious places ==
=== Temples ===
- Sai Mandir, Bagade Wadi
- Vithhal Rukmai Mandir, Vithhal Mandir Ward
- Old Bhairawa Shiva Temple, Bengali Camp Road
- Remains Of Old Temple, Near Bagade Wadi
- Durga Mandir, Bengali Camp
- Videhi Sadguru Jagannath Maharaj Math, Vijasan
- Datta Mandir, Sane Guruji Society
- Shiva Temple, Malhari Baba Society, Sumthana
- Balaji Temple, O.F Chanda - Sumthana Road
- Remains Of Medieval Temple, Dollara Talav
- Zinguji Maharaj Math, Zinguji Ward
- Gajanan Maharaj Mandir, Suraksha Nagar

=== Mosques ===
- Khwaja Garib Nawaz Masjid, Bhojward
- Jama Masjid, Bazar Ward
- Madina Masjid, Shahi Square
- Defence Mosque, O.F Chanda - Sumthana Road
- Hanfiya Masjid, Dollara Talav
- Noorani Masjid, Gaurala
- Aqsa Masjid, Santaji Nagar

=== Gurudwaras ===
- Gurudwara Gurunanak Sahib, Dollara
- Gurudwara, O.F Chanda - Sumthana Road

=== Churches ===
- St. Thomas Church, Gandhi Square
- The Pentecostal Mission Church, Thenge Plot, Chichordi
- O.F Chanda Church, O.F Chanda - Sumthana Road
- Christian Church, Dollara Talav
- Jesus Evangelical Church, Guru nagar Near Murmura Karkhana

== Economy ==
=== Major Employers ===
- Ordnance Factory
- Western Coalfields Limited
- Karnataka EMTA
- Open Cast Coal Mines

Bhadravati is surrounded by open cast coal mines. There are mines at Majri, Chargaon, New Kunada, Telvasa, Dhorwasa, Baranj.

Bhadrawati Market Bhadravati also has a market place (composed of grain and grocery stores, cloths and general shops, households appliances, specialized hospitals, medical stores, good hotels, etc.) serving the localities and nearby villages.

== Transport ==
=== Bus ===
The city is served by a MSRTC bus stand on NH-930, or the Nagpur-Chandrapur Highway. Buses run to various destinations like Aurangabad, Mancherial, Nagpur, Pune, Wardha, Gondia, Yavatmal, Ambejogai, and Shirdi. There are also private buses to Nagpur, Chandrapur, Chimur, and Pune other destinations.

=== Railway ===
Bhadrawati Railway Station is Regular Type Railway Station. The Name Of Bhadrawati Railway Station is Bhandak Railway Station. Is Situated at 4 km South at Gaurala From MSRTC Bus Stop. This Railway Station Situated At Delhi-Chennai Route Under Central Railway Nagpur Region. There are few stoppages of train here.

=== Road ===
At As the city is located on MH MSH 264 or NH-930 it has good transport facility. Bhadrawati Also Connected To Bhadrawati-Chandankheda-Shegaon Road, Bhadrawati-Konda-Majri-Wani Road

=== Local Transport ===
Auto rickshaw are the only public transport in the city. Black And Yellow Taxies And Rikshaws Also Available for Chandrapur, Lonara, Ghodpeth, Tadali, Padoli, Dhorwasa, Telwasa, Chandankheda, Baranj, Konda & Majari etc.

=== Other Transport ===
Bhadrawati is connected with major cities like Chandrapur, Nagpur, Pune, Aurangabad, Adilabad, Akola, Amravati, Yavatmal, Pusad, Asifabad, Hyderabad Raipur, Washim, Gadchiroli, Darwha, Digras, Ner etc... by MSRTC buses, Private Transport System & CR Railway.

== Education ==
Bhadravati has below education facilities.

=== Schools and Colleges ===
- Dr. Ambedkar Memorial High School
- Shri Sai Convent State & CBSE
- N.S. College of Science.
- Fairyland school
- Vivekanand College
- New Vivekanand Kanya Vidyalaya.
- Z.P. High School
- Lokmanya Tilak Maha Vidyalaya
- St Anne's High School
- Ordnance Factory High School
- K.V.O.F. Chanda
- Karmavir Vidyalaya
- Takshshila College
- Y.S. Jr. College
- Macaroon Student's Academy
- Manwatkar college of pharmacy
- CIBMRD COLLEGE.
- NAFS Fire&safety College
- jijamata DED College
- Sky education
- Tarashakti Pvt ITI

=== Primary Schools ===
- Eurolittles Pre School
- Twinkling Stars Kindergarten
- Bhadrawati Public School
- Dnyaandeep English Medium School
- Shri Sai Convent
- Ankur Vidya Mandir
- Dafodil Convent
- Yashwantrao shinde primary school
- Children's Academy English Medium School.

=== Industrial Training & Engineering College ===
- Shri Sai College of Engineering and Technology
- Govt. Industrial Training Institute
- Shri Sai Industrial Training Institute
- Nilkanthrao Shinde Pvt. Industrial Training Institute
- Priyadarshini Industrial Training Institute
- Kutemate Industrial Training Institute

== Demographics ==
Bhadravati is a Municipal Council city in district of Chandrapur, Maharashtra. The Bhadravati city is divided into 26 wards for which elections are held every 5 years. The Bhadravati Municipal Council has population of 40,565 of which 21,451 are males while 19,114 are females as per report released by census of India 2011,

Population of children with age of 0-6 is 6211 which is 10.26% of total population of Bhadravati. Female Sex Ratio is of 926 against state average of 929. Child sex ratio in Bhadravati is around 954 compared to Maharashtra state average of 894. Literacy rate of Bhadravati city is 89.26%, higher than state average of 82.34%. Male literacy is 93.02% while female literacy rate is 85.19%.

Bhadravati Municipal Council has over 14,617 houses to which it supplies basic amenities like water and sewerage. It is also authorized to build roads within municipal council limits and impose taxes on properties under its jurisdiction.

Year	Male	Female	Total Population	Change	Religion (%)							
Year	Male	Female	Total Population	Change	Hindu	Muslim	Christian	Sikhs	Buddhist	Jain	Other religions and persuasions	Religion not stated
2001	29812	27091	56903	-	74.479	4.334	0.963	0.213	19.363	0.315	0.322	0.012
2011	31451	29114	60565	0.064	75.481	4.770	0.657	0.132	18.403	0.327	0.149	0.081
