= Sindewahi =

- town
- Location in Maharashtra, India
- Coordinates: 20°17′N 79°39′E
- Country: India
- State: Maharashtra
- District: Chandrapur

Government
  - Type: Nagar Panchayat
  - Body: Sindewahi Nagar Panchayat

Population (2011)
  - Total: 12,914

Languages
  - Official: Marathi
- Time zone: UTC+5:30 (IST)
- PIN: 441222
- Telephone code: 07178
- Vehicle registration: MH 34
- Nearest city: Chandrapur
- Sex ratio: 1000/765 ♂/♀
- Literacy: 76%
- Vidhan Sabha constituency: Bramhapuri Assembly constituency
- Climate: moderate (Köppen)

Sindewahi (Village ID 541049) is a town and Nagar Panchayat (an administrative center) in Chandrapur district, Maharashtra, India. Notable villages in this tehsil are Navargaon, Ladbori and Ramala. Nagpur, the nearest large city, is about 130 kilometres (81 mi) away. According to the 2011 census it has a population of 12914 living in 3214 households.

== Description ==
The first Rice Research Center was established in Sindewahi, where various researchers work to discover new rice varieties.

- Gram Sewak Training Center is also in Sindewahi, one of only two in Maharashtra (the other is in Pune).

Ghodazari Lake and Asolamenda Talaw are picnic areas near Sindewahi. Asola Mendha is one of the biggest reservoirs in Maharashtra.

- Sindewahi City is surrounded by a forest in which tigers and other wild animals can be found.

Ram Mandir is the oldest temple of sindewahi City near by wholesale market is situated.

- Sindevahi was once famous for jaggery, cloth, silk and much more.

Sindevahi is located on Nagpur-Nagbhid-Mul-Chandrapur State Highway No. 9 and Gondia-Nagbhid-Chanda Railway at a distance of 130 km from Nagpur and 70 km from Chandrapur.

- Even though it has recently become a Nagar Panchayat, it is a small town like any other taluka with a population of only 12,914 and a population of 15,000 to 20,000 by adding the surrounding settlements.

== History ==
The earliest mention of this village is found in the time of Vyankoji Bhosale (1788 AD), the grandson of the first Raghuji Raje Bhosale of Nagpur.

- Vyankoji was married to a girl from the Gujar family and gave cattle to Sindevahi as a gift to his nephew 'Gujabadada Gujar'.
  - Later, Navloji Gujar, who lived in Nagpur during the British rule, was a cattle farmer here.

However, there is no conclusive evidence as to which Shinde family the name Sindevahi came from or fell from a tree called Sindi.

Earlier, the Sindewahi was a small village in Gadbori parish, 7 km from there.

- Gadbori, once a major pargana during the Gond and later Maratha rule, is now a neglected and remote village.

In the past there were a large number of Telugu speaking weavers and Brahmins, But being within the main road and in the early British period only the name Pargana remained, all the settlements migrated to Sindevahi and other places.

- The Gond states gave shelter to the hardworking people namely 'Kohli' in Gadbori, Sindevahi, Navargaon area to build a lake. According to Hiralal and Russell's book, the Kohali people from chanda were very fond of sugarcane cultivation and built this fertile area with several lakes and made it famous as a 'jaggery depot'.

Sugarcane, jaggery, paddy, textiles and a small amount of silk business made Sindewahi prosperous. But later, due to the economic imperialist policies of the British, the handloom business here, like other cities, came to a standstill. The population of Sindevahi, which had a population of 4569 in 1881, was reduced to 3951 by 1891 due to migration and drought. Due to two severe droughts and diseases in 1896 and 1899, the size of Sindevahi was halved in 1901 and only 2932 people remained, including more than half of the Telugu speakers.

The Asola Mendha, Ghodazari and Naleshwar reservoirs were planned by the British government in the central province around 1905 to avert the damage caused by the previous drought and the resulting loss of life. At the same time in 1911 Nagpur-Nagbhid railway was brought to Rajoli and in 1913 Sindewahi was connected to Chandya. Then the police station at Talodhi was brought to Sindewahi and Talodhi had to wait for the next 100 years for the police station.

Earlier, the British government had been monitoring jaggery production here since 1820 and for this they took over 150 acres of land in Sindevahi in the 1912–13 season and set up an 'Agriculture Farm' or today's 'Agricultural Research Center'. British officials were researching new varieties of sugarcane, cotton and rice here. At the same time, research was being done on entomology and soil.

Sugarcane juice kilns have been used in this area for centuries to make jaggery. The British authorities made some changes in it and made it world-famous by naming it 'Sindewahi furnace'. Not one or two but hundreds of dissertations have been published in the periodicals of that time. The low cost and low fuel jaggery kiln was initially compared to the Poona Furnace in the Pune area. Due to the relatively high benefits of Sindewahi Bhatti, it used to be demonstrated at all farmers' conventions across India. The comparative study of each new furnace used to be done with Sindewahi furnace. Sindewahi kilns were built for farmers in Madras, Punjab, Uttar Pradesh and Bihar. However, later due to mechanization, such kilns became obsolete.

The discovery of a new variety of cotton called 'Sindewahi Cross' also started here. This species also became very famous. Until recently, even a rice variety called 'Sindewahi' was a special favorite of farmers. Sindewahi may be the only village in the country named after a sugarcane kiln, cotton and rice varieties. In 1922, Sir Frank Sly, the then Governor of Central Province, visited a research center in Ghodazari while hunting. All this research was done under the supervision of British officials when Sindewahi had no electricity. Electricity to Sindewahi, however, came much later on January 19, 1959.

After independence, this agricultural research center was further developed by the Government of India as 'Gramsevak Training Center and Agricultural Research Center'. Even today, these centers are famous as a specialty of Sindewahi. Many may not know this but Sindewahi has also done research on malaria. Sindewahi was the first to experiment with 50% benzene hexachloride spraying, which was once used to control malaria.

Today, however, this part experiences high rates of unemployment. Once famous for jaggery kilns, production has completed halted in present day. Gosikhurd Irrigation Project and the forthcoming Nagpur-Nagbhid broad gauge railway link to Nagpur may rekindle the region's economic prosperity. Experimental farming practices may prove beneficial to the region.

Nearby Places to Visit:Naleshwar Dam

Naleshwar Dam is located approximately 10 kilometers south of Sindewahi, near Mohali Naleshwar village in the Chandrapur district of Maharashtra. The dam is nestled within the forests of Tadoba National Park, offering a serene and scenic environment surrounded by rich biodiversity.

Built in 1914 by the British, Naleshwar Dam remains an important historical and irrigation landmark in the region. A notable nearby structure is the “Babu Ka Bangla”, an old British-era guesthouse situated close to the dam, adding to its colonial charm.

Pangadi Tourist Gate (Tadoba National Park)

Pangadi Tourist Gate is a newly opened entry point for visitors to Tadoba National Park, offering easier access for tourists from Sindewahi, Nagpur, and Gadchiroli. This gate is well-connected with good road infrastructure via Mul, Sindewahi, and Chimur. For safari bookings and availability, visit the official site:

Annad Nagari (Sitachi Nahani) Annad Nagari, locally known as Sitachi Nahani, is a peaceful spiritual site ideal for short visits and meditation. It houses a revered Datta Guru Temple, and becomes a hub of celebration during Datta Guru Pournima. The Dodke Patil family from Mohali village plays a significant role in maintaining the spiritual and cultural connection to this place. They are known for organizing the Yatra on this sacred occasion.

Kukadeti Pat – Shankar Pat Festival

Every year on 26 January, the village of Kukadeti hosts a grand local fair known as Shankar Pat, featuring the traditional bullock cart race. This cultural event holds deep significance for the people in the region and attracts large local crowds. It showcases the rich rural heritage and festive spirit of the community.
