= Chimur =

- Town & Sub District
- Nickname: Kranti Bhoomi
- Location in Maharashtra, India
- Coordinates: 20°29′49″N 79°22′36″E
- Country: India
- State: Maharashtra
- District: Chandrapur

Government
  - Type: City Council (नगरपरिषद)
- Elevation: 260 m (850 ft)

Languages
  - Official: Marathi
- Time zone: UTC+5:30 (IST)
- PIN: 442903
- Vehicle registration: MH 34
- Nearest city: Nagpur 94 km (58 mi)

Chimur is a city and a municipal council in Chandrapur District, in the state of Maharashtra, India. It is one of the Indian Parliamentary Constituencies and a Vidhan Sabha constituency.

== Overview ==
Chimur (tos) is a tehsil of Chandrapur district in Maharashtra, India, with a population of about 170,000 according to the 2011 Indian Census. There are offices of the Tehsildar, SDO, and Additional Collectorate's.

Chimur (tos) can be reached by road from Warora, which is also the nearest railway station on the Wardha-Ballarpur-Hyderabad link. From Warora, it is 55 kilometres (34 mi) and 101 kilometres (63 mi) from Chandrapur. A regular bus service runs between Chimur and Nagpur, which is 94 kilometres (58 mi) away.

Chimur has a large market because it is so apart from other towns and cities. Chimur does not have much education institutions as it has English and Marathi medium schools. People can graduate from Gondwana University.

Chimur is located between Wardha, Chandrapur, Gondiya, Bhandara, Gadchiroli, and Nagpur. It is about 100 kilometres (60 mi) from all these district places.

== History ==
Chimur is famous for its active participation in the Indian Freedom Struggle during the Quit India Movement of 1942. Balwantrao Deshmukh (27 March 1878 - 18 November 1957) was an Indian lawyer, Indian National Congress (INC) politician and independence activist from Chandrapur.

The 400 years old Chimur Ghoda Yatra festival at historic Shri Hari Balaji Maharaj temple, started by Bhosle Sarkar, is held in February on the day of Vasant Panchami with Balaji Navratra, followed by Rudra Swahakar Yadnya and Navratri and concludes Mahashivratri.

== Local attractions ==
The famous Tadoba Andhari Tiger Project & National Park is at a distance of 14 km (8.7 mi) from Chimur. This park is a successful example of the conservation of the tiger, the national animal of India. The other animal species found in Tadoba are Bear, Gava (Indian Bison), and Chital (Indian Spotted Dear). The park is also famous for its biodiversity. Hospitality services are available in the park.

== See also ==
- Chimur Lok Sabha constituency
- Gadpipari
