= Umred =

Town in Maharashtra, India

- town
- Location in Maharashtra, India.
- Coordinates: 20.85°N 79.33°E
- Country: India
- State: Maharashtra
- District: Nagpur

Government
  - Body: Umred Municipal Council
- Elevation: 292 m (958 ft)

Population (2011)
  - Total: 53,971

Languages
  - Official: Marathi
- Time zone: UTC+5:30 (IST)
- PIN: 441203
- Telephone code: 07116
- Vehicle registration: MH-40

Umred is a town and a municipal council in the Nagpur district of Maharashtra, India. According to the 2011 census the city has a population of 53971.

== Geography ==
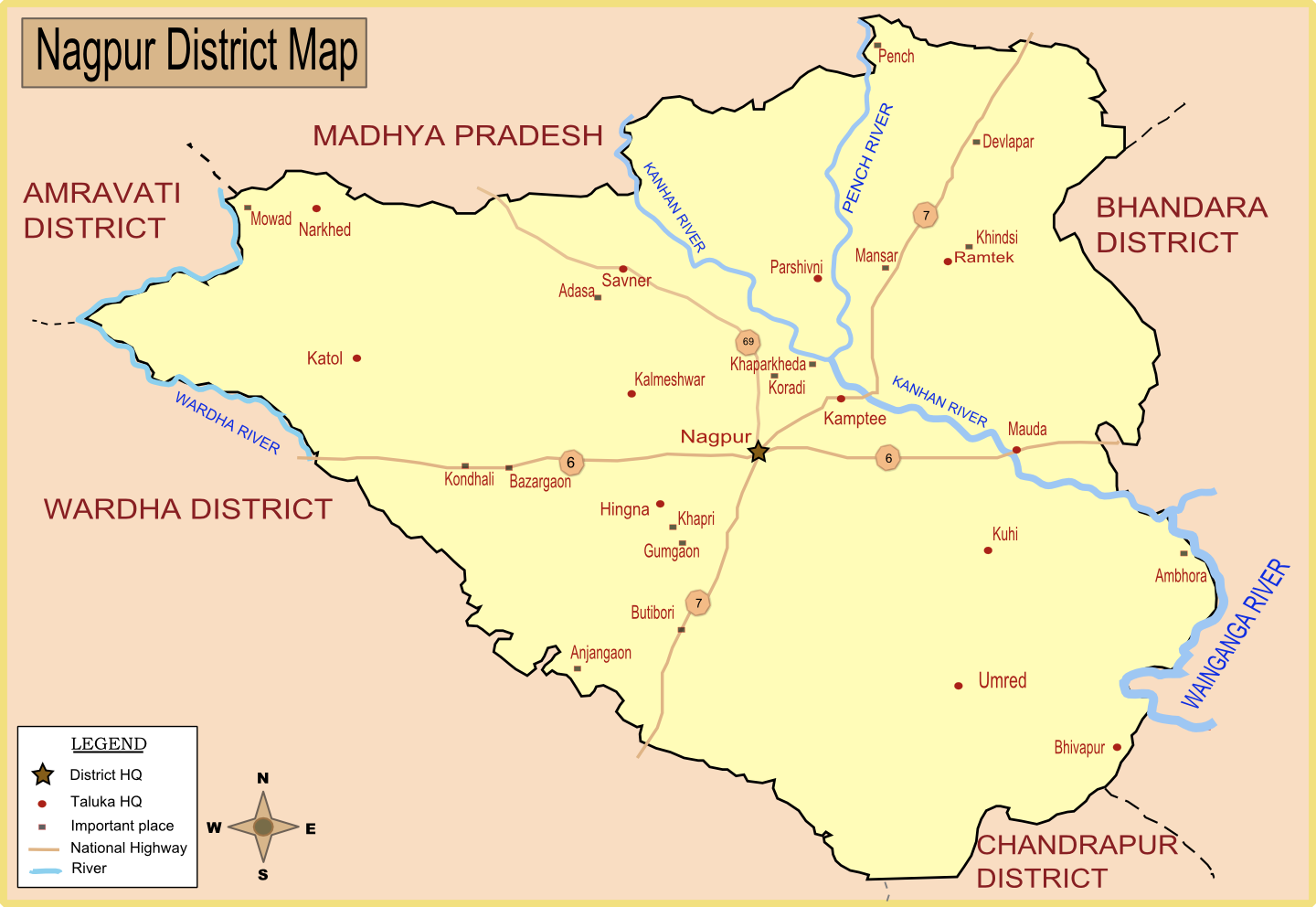
Map of Nagpur district with major towns(including Umred) and rivers Aam.

Umred is located at 20° 51' 14N and 17° 19' 29E, at an elevation of 290 meters above sea level. It's STD code is 07116.

== Demographics ==
As of the 2011 India census, Umred had a population of 53,971. Males account for 27,456 residents and females for 26515 36,947 of the city's residents are considered literate.

Year	Male	Female	Total Population	Change	Religion (%)							
Year	Male	Female	Total Population	Change	Hindu	Muslim	Christian	Sikhs	Buddhist	Jain	Other religions and persuasions	Religion not stated
2001	25454	24123	49577	-	84.569	4.038	0.175	0.075	10.848	0.109	0.071	0.115
2011	27456	26515	53971	8.863	81.894	4.358	0.248	0.069	11.749	0.080	1.025	0.578

== Transportation and Communication ==
Umred is also connected to Nagpur via State Highway No. 9.
