= Nagbhid =

- town
- Location in Maharashtra, India
- Coordinates: 20°35′0″N 79°40′0″E
- Country: India
- State: Maharashtra
- District: Chandrapur

Government
  - Type: Municipal Council
  - Body: Nagbhir Municipal Council

Languages
  - Official: Marathi
- Time zone: UTC+5:30 (IST)
- PIN: 441205
- Telephone code: 07179
- Vehicle registration: MH34
- Lok Sabha constituency: Gadchiroli-Chimur
- Vidhan Sabha constituency: Chimur

Nagbhid, also known as Nagbhir, is a town and a municipal council in the Chandrapur district in the Indian state of Maharashtra.

== Railway ==
Nagbhid is served by Nagbhir Junction railway station. It is a narrow gauge route of 110 km that connects to the Gondia-Balharshah route at Nagbhir Junction railway station.
