= Chandrapur district =

Coordinates: 19°57′N 79°18′E

- District of Maharashtra
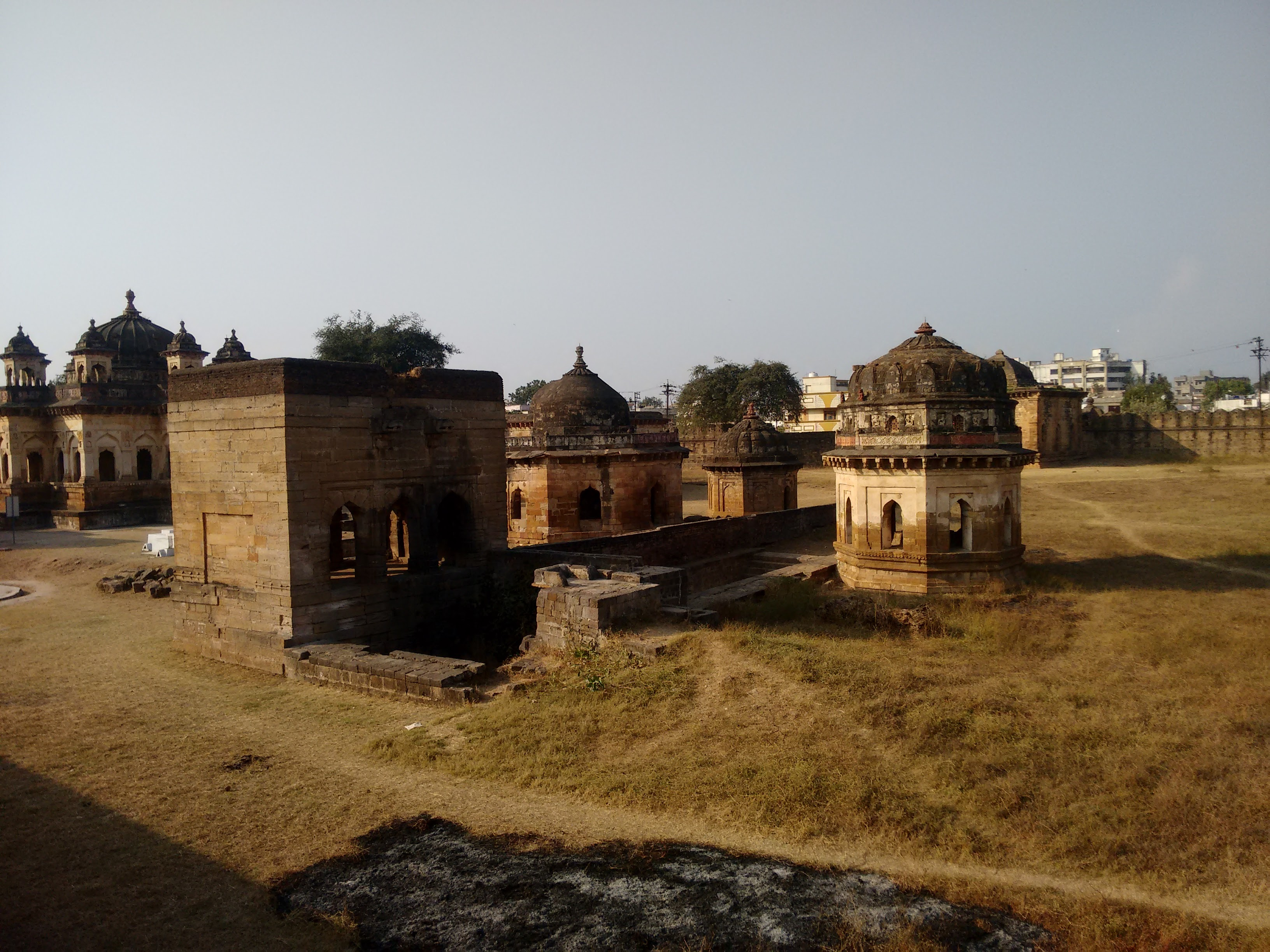
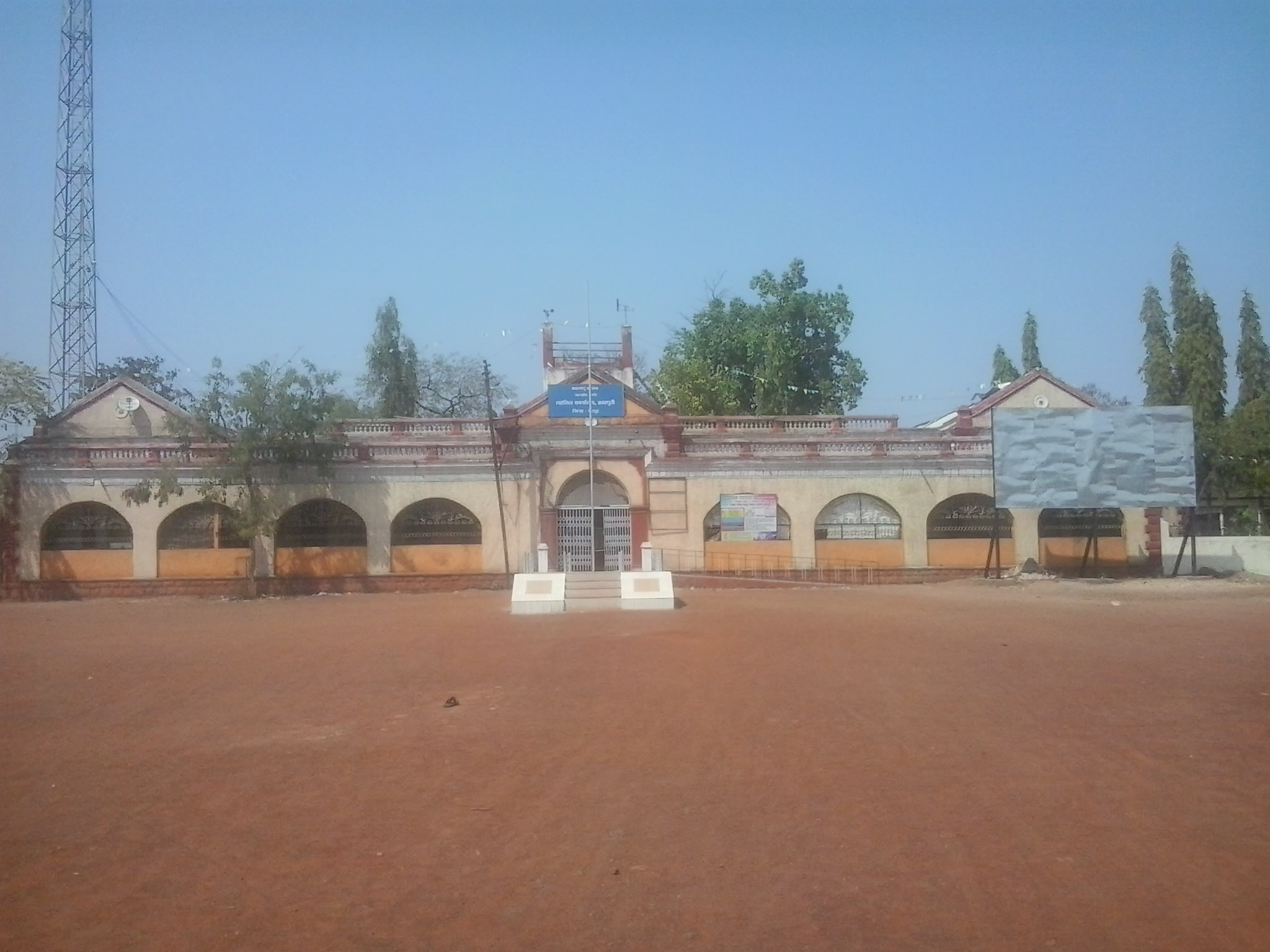
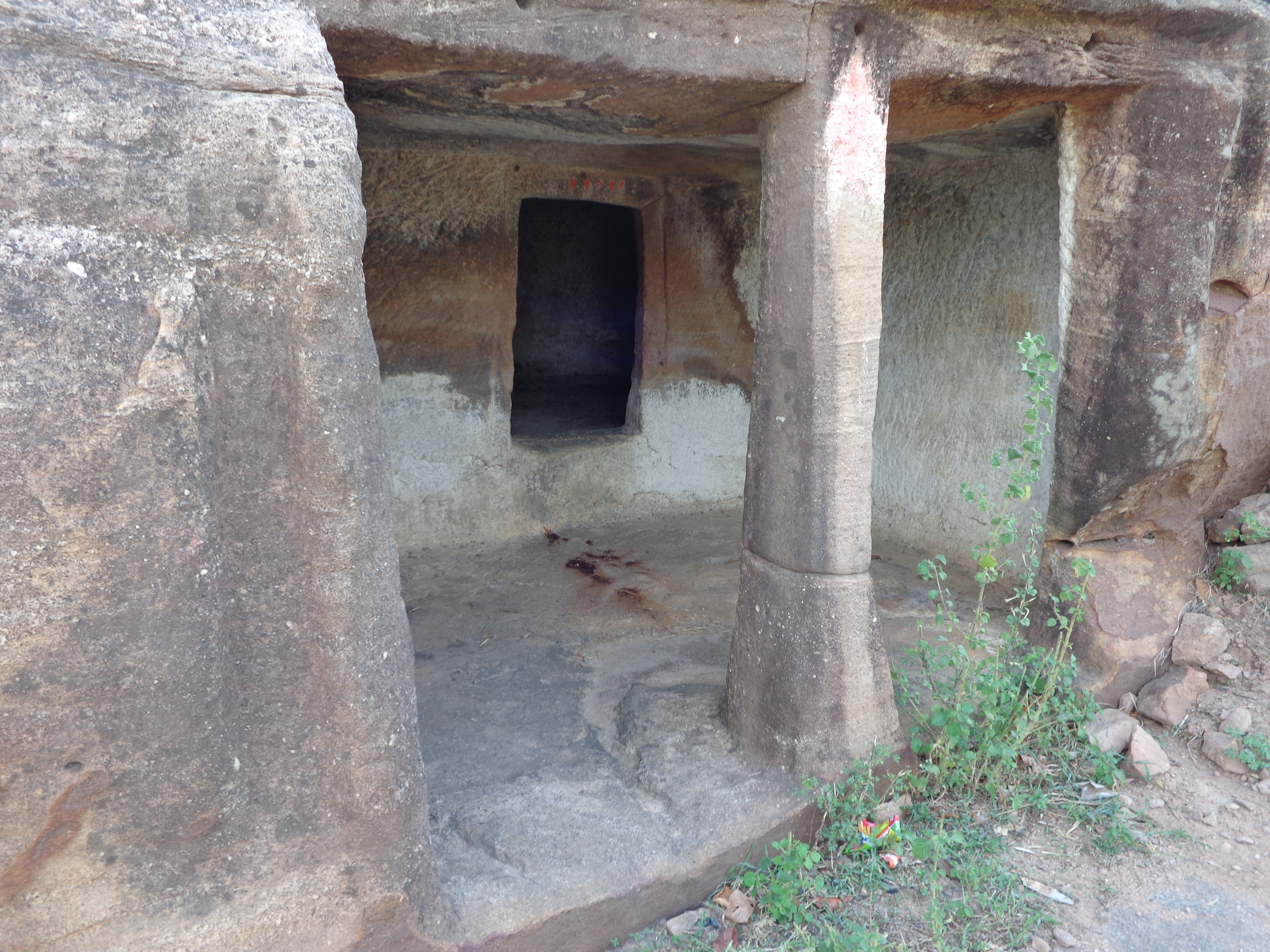
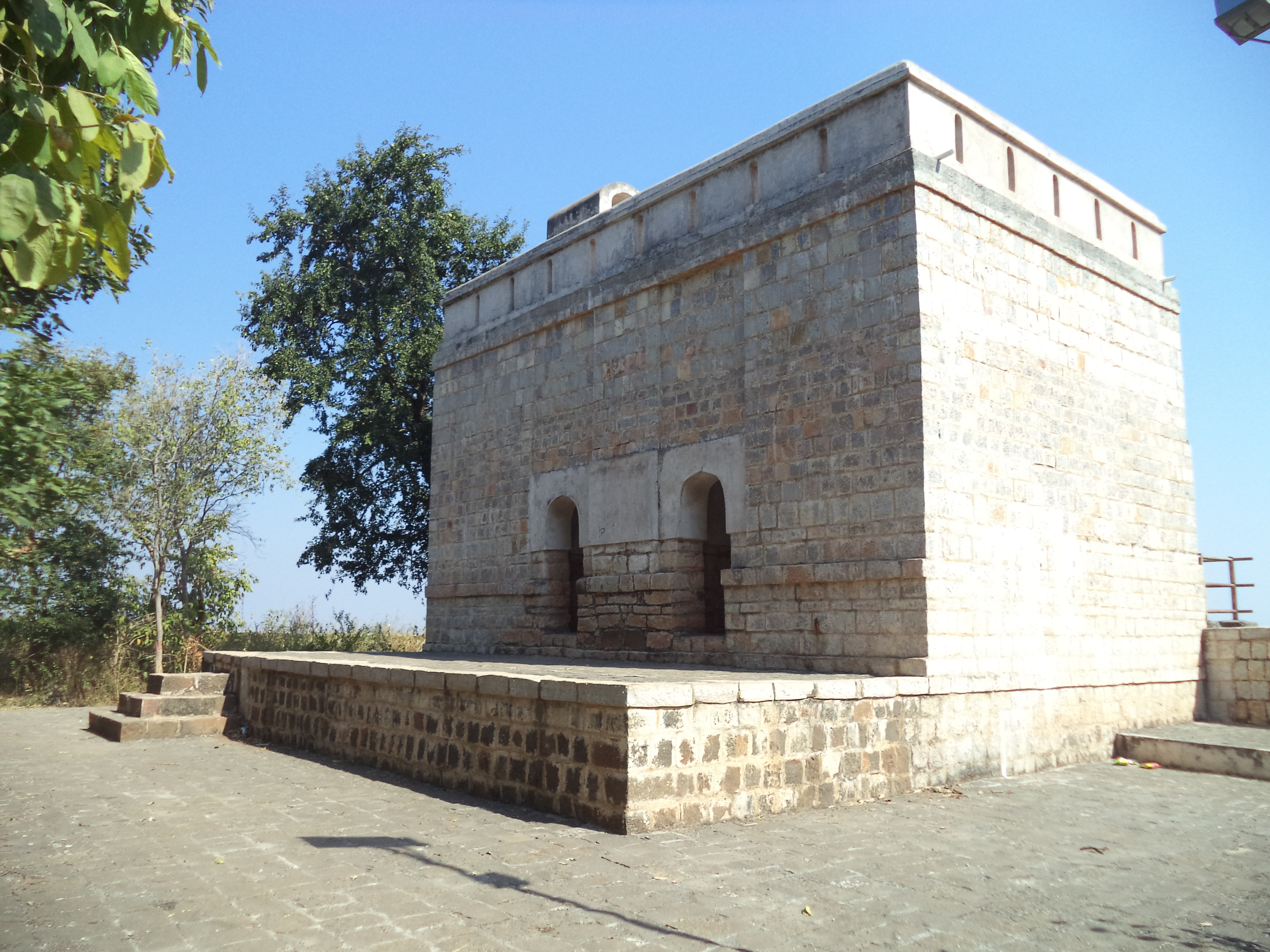
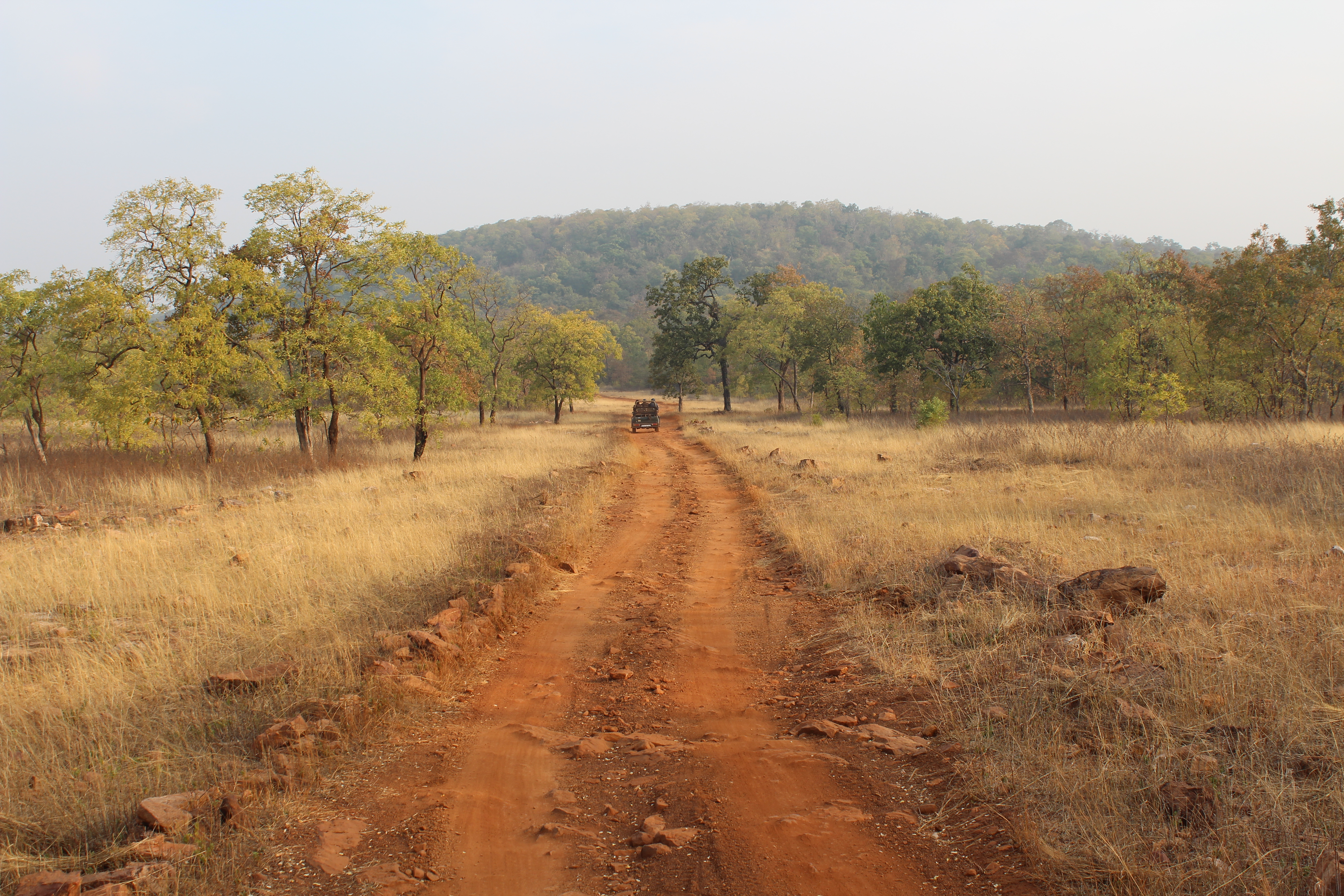
- Clockwise from top-left: Gond Raja's Tomb in Chandrapur, Nagar Parishad building in Bramhapuri, Manikgad Fort, Tadoba Andhari Tiger Reserve, Panch Pandav Caves in Mohadi
- Interactive map of Chandrapur district
- Country: India
- State: Maharashtra
- Division: Nagpur
- Headquarters: Chandrapur
- Tehsils: 1. Chandrapur, 2. Bhadravati, 3. Warora, 4. Chimur, 5. Nagbhid, 6. Bramhapuri, 7. Sindewahi, 8. Mul, 9. Saoli, 10. Gondpimpri, 11. Rajura, 12. Korpana, 13. Pomburna, 14. Ballarpur, 15. Jivati

Government
  - Body: Chandrapur Zilla Parishad
  - Guardian Minister: Ashok Uikey (Cabinet Minister Mha)
  - Office bearers: President Mrs. Sandhya Gurnule; Vice President Mrs. Rekha Karekar
  - District Collector: GC Vinay Gowda, IAS
  - CEO, Zilla Parishad: Ms. Bhagyashree Dilip Vispute (IAS)
  - Chief Conservator of Forest (CCF) Cum Wildlife Warden: Dr. Jitendra Ramgaonkar, IFS

Area
  - Total: 11,443 km^{2} (4,418 sq mi)

Population (2011)
  - Total: 2,204,307
  - Density: 192.63/km^{2} (498.92/sq mi)
  - Urban: 35.12%

Demographics
  - Literacy: 88.22% (as per 2011 census)
  - Sex ratio: 961
- Time zone: UTC+05:30 (IST)
- Major highways: NH 353E, NH 930, MSH 6, MSH 9, SH 233, SH 243, SH 264
- Average annual precipitation: 1578 mm
- Website: chanda.nic.in

Chandrapur district (Marathi pronunciation: [t͡ʃən̪d̪ɾəpuːɾ]) (earlier known as Chanda district) is a district in the Nagpur Division in the Indian state of Maharashtra. Chandrapur was the largest district in India until the Gadchiroli and Sironcha tehsils were separated as Gadchiroli district in 1981. In 2011, the district population was 2,204,307.

Chandrapur district is known for its super thermal power station, and its vast reserves of coal in Wardha Valley Coalfield. Chandrapur also has large reservoirs of limestone which is a raw material for cement manufacturing in the district.

Chandrapur district is known for its cleanliness. Now Chandrapur city is in the top 10 cleanest cities India and 2 in Maharashtra after Navi Mumbai by The minister of housing and urban affairs rank cities based on the cleanliness index.

Tadoba Andhari Tiger Reserve in the district is one of India's fifty-three Project Tiger reserves. The 2015 census of tigers found that 120 of Maharashtra's 170 tigers were located in Chandrapur district. The district has the highest tiger population in Maharashtra which leads to several man animal conflicts.

== Officer ==
=== Member of Parliament ===
- Pratibha Dhanorkar (INC) (Chandrapur)
- Namdeo Kirsan (INC) (Gadchiroli–Chimur)

=== Guardian Minister ===
Guardian Minister, Chandrapur District
- पालकमंत्री, चंद्रपूर
- Emblem of India

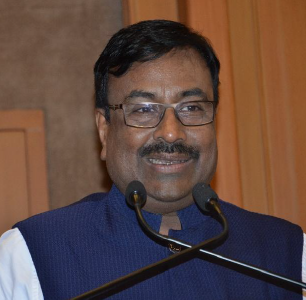
- Incumbent; Sudhir Mungantiwar since 27 September 2022
- Style: The Honourable
- Residence: Chandrapur
- Appointer: Chief Minister of Maharashtra
- Term length: 5 years / No time limit
- Website: chandrapur.gov.in/en/

Name	Term of office
Sanjay Deotale	2004-2009
Ramesh Bagwe	7 November 2009 - 10 November 2010
Jitendra Awhad	11 November 2010 - 26 September 2014
Sudhir Mungantiwar	5 December 2014 - 8 November 2019
Vijay Namdevrao Wadettiwar	9 January 2020 - 29 June 2022
Sudhir Mungantiwar	24 September 2022- Incumbent

=== District Magistrate/Collector ===
District Magistrate / Collector Chandrapur
- जिल्हाधिकारी तथा जिल्हादंडाधिकारी, चंद्रपूर
- Emblem of India
- Incumbent; Shri Ajay Gulhane (IAS) since 2020
- Residence: At Chandrapur district
- Appointer: Government of Maharashtra
- Term length: 3 yrs.
- Website: chandrapur.gov.in/en/

==== list of District Magistrate / Collector ====
Name	Term of office
Shri Ajay Gulhane (IAS)	2020 - 2022
G.C. Vinay Gowda	2022 - incumbent

== Sub-Divisions ==
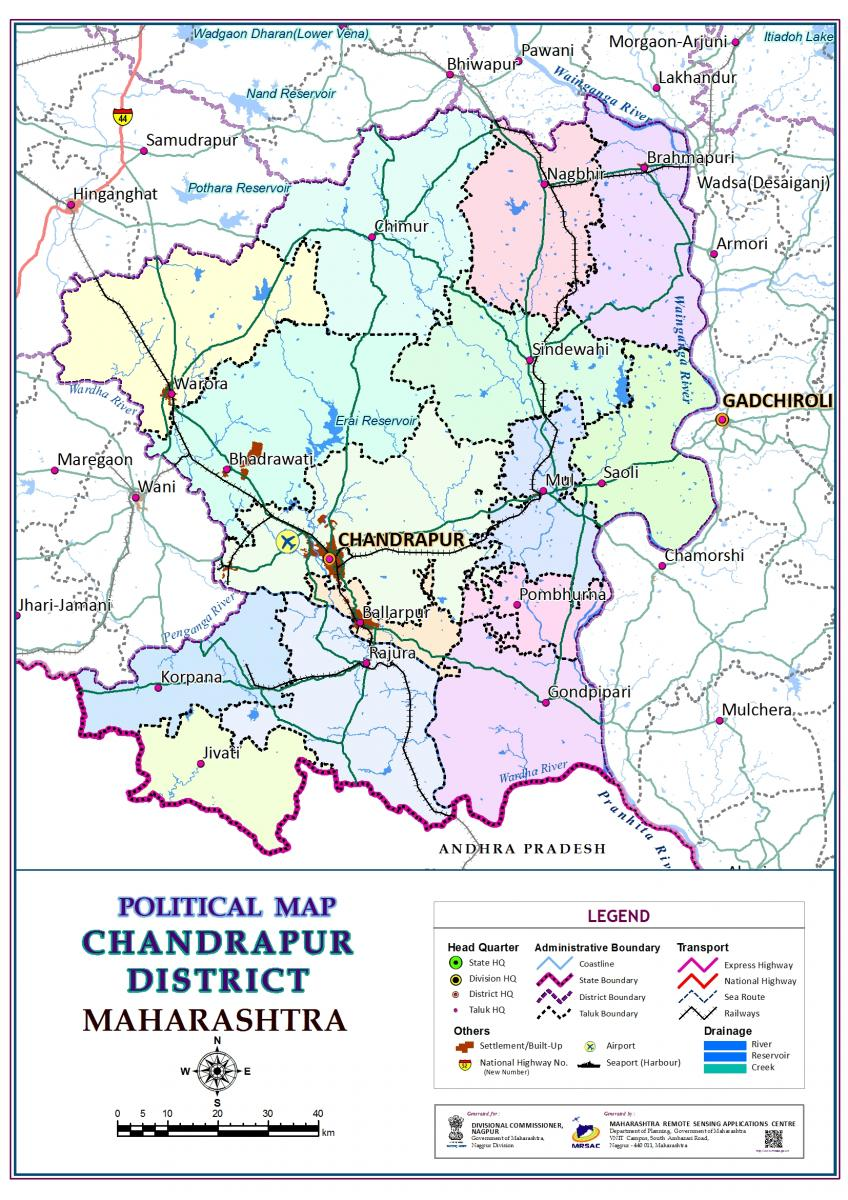
Political Map of Chandrapur District in the Indian State of Maharashtra. Generated by Maharashtra Remote Sensing Applications Centre (MRSAC) for Govt of Maharashtra.

Chandrapur district comprises 23 census towns and 1792 villages spread over 15 talukas.

Subdivisions and talukas in Chandrapur District
Subdivision	Talukas	Villages
Chandrapur	Chandrapur	91
Ballarpur	Ballarpur	31
Mul	Mul	106
Mul	Saoli	111
Gondpimpri	Gondpimpri	97
Gondpimpri	Pombhurna	71
Warora	Warora	182
Warora	Bhadravati	154
Chimur	Chimur	259
Chimur	Sindewahi	115
Rajura	Rajura	108
Rajura	Korpana	110
Rajura	Jiwati	83
Bramhapuri	Bramhapuri	136
Bramhapuri	Nagbhid	138

== Politics ==
The district contains six Vidhan Sabha (legislative assembly) constituencies. They are Rajura, Chandrapur, Ballarpur, Warora, Bramhapuri and Chimur. Rajura, Chandrapur, Ballarpur, and Warora are part of the Chandrapur Lok Sabha constituency. Bramhapuri and Chimur are part of the Gadchiroli-Chimur Lok Sabha constituency.

== Demography ==
Historical population
Year	Pop.	±% p.a.
1901	397,079	—
1911	504,261	+2.42%
1921	494,594	−0.19%
1931	569,233	+1.42%
1941	651,323	+1.36%
1951	728,013	+1.12%
1961	851,678	+1.58%
1971	1,117,908	+2.76%
1981	1,416,953	+2.40%
1991	1,771,994	+2.26%
2001	2,071,101	+1.57%
2011	2,204,307	+0.63%

Religions in Chandrapur district (2011)
Religion	Per cent
Hinduism	80.75%
Buddhism	13.01%
Islam	4.19%
Tribal religion	1.05%
Christianity	0.49%
Other or not stated	0.51%

At the time of the 2011 census of India, Chandrapur district had a population of 2,204,307, which was 1.96 per cent of the population of the Maharashtra state. The district population density was 193 inhabitants per square kilometre (500/sq mi). Between 2001 and 2011, the district population grew by 6.43 per cent. Females numbered 1,080,473 and males 1,123,834. For every 1,000 males, there were 961 females. 80.01 per cent of people in Chandrapur district were literate. 35.18% of the population lived in urban areas. Scheduled Castes and Scheduled Tribes made up 15.80% and 17.66% of the population respectively.

Languages of Chandrapur district (2011)
1. Marathi (83.6%)
2. Hindi (7.00%)
3. Telugu (2.58%)
4. Gondi (1.59%)
5. Urdu (0.98%)
6. Others (4.22%)

At the time of the 2011 Census of India, 83.63% of the population in the district spoke Marathi, 7.00% Hindi, 2.58% Telugu, 1.59% Gondi and 0.98% Urdu as their first language.

== Geography ==
The Chandrapur district is located in the far east of Maharashtra state. It is part of Nagpur division. The district is in the eastern part of the Vidarbha region. The Chandrapur district is located between 19.30’ N and 20.45’ N latitude and at 78.46’ E longitude. The district is surrounded by Bhandara and Nagpur districts at its northern side, Wardha and Yavatmal districts at its western side, Gadchiroli district on the eastern side and Komaram Bheem and Adilabad districts of Telangana state on the southern side. In the Survey of India degree sheet, it falls in NOS 55 LF and 56 I M.

The Kanhargaon Wildlife Sanctuary is situated here.

== Economy ==
The Chandrapur district has large deposits of coal. The district also has limestone mines for the manufacturing of cement. The Chandrapur Super Thermal Power Station managed by the Maharashtra State Power Generation Company Limited is a thermal power plant. The Chandrapur Ferro Alloy Plant, a public sector unit engaged in the production of manganese based ferro-alloys.

In 1956, the Ballarpur Industries Limited paper mill was founded in the district. Raw materials such as bamboo, wood, sabai grass, soya bean and cottonseed oil, rags and yarn waste are sourced locally.

== See also ==
- List of talukas in Chandrapur district
- Tadoba Andhari Tiger Reserve
- Irai Dam
- Chandrapur Super Thermal Power Station
- Chandrapur Ferro Alloy Plant
- Ballarpur Industries Limited
