= Bramhapuri =

- Town
- Interactive map of Bramhapuri
- Coordinates: 20.6068°N 79.8644°E
- Country: India
- State: Maharashtra
- Region: Vidarbha
- District: Chandrapur
- Taluka: Bramhapuri

Area
  - Total: 15 km^{2} (5.8 sq mi)
- Elevation: 229.5 m (753 ft)

Population (2011)
  - Total: 36,025
  - Density: 2,400/km^{2} (6,200/sq mi)

Languages
  - Official: Marathi
- Time zone: UTC+5:30 (IST)
- PIN: 441206
- Telephone code: 07177
- Vehicle registration: MH34
- Nearest city: Nagpur

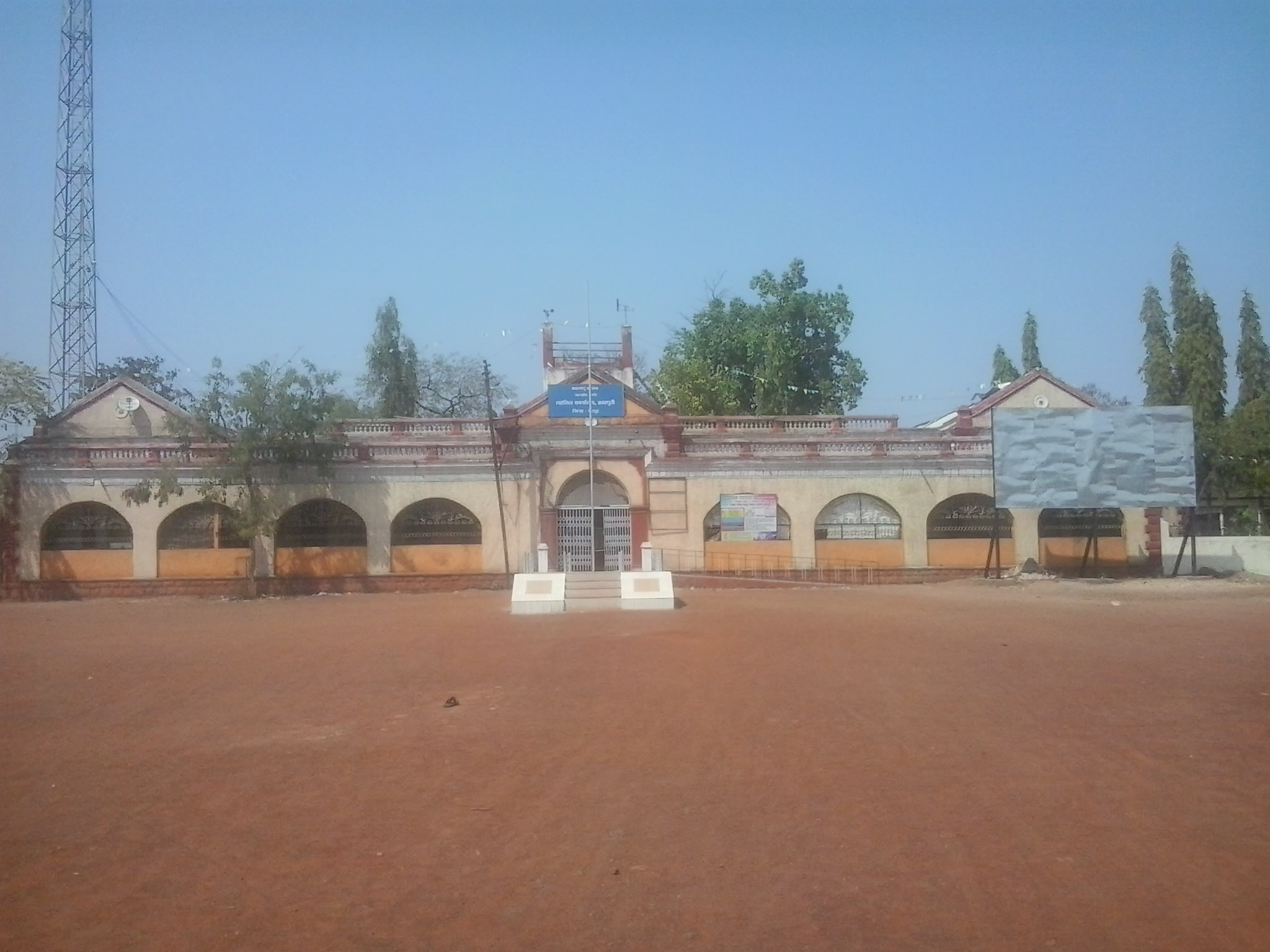
Tehsil Office, Bramhapuri

Bramhapuri is a town and headquarters of Bramhapuri taluka in Chandrapur district in the state of Maharashtra, India.

== Geography ==
Bramhapuri is one of the six divisions located in the northeastern part of Chandrapur district, Maharashtra at 20.36°N 79.51°E and has an average elevation of 229.5 metres (753 feet). The town is located in the 73rd Vidhan Sabha constituency in Maharashtra.

== Demographics ==
According to 2011 Indian census, Brahmapuri Municipal Council administers over 8,575 households composing a population of 36,025. Males constitute 50.10% of the total population and females 49.90%. The population of children, aged 0 to 6, is 3,283, which constitute 9.11 % of the total population of Brahmapuri.

In Brahmapuri Municipal Council, the female sex ratio is of 996 against the state average of 929. The child sex ratio in Brahmapuri is around 990 compared to the Maharashtra state average of 894. The literacy rate of Brahmapuri city is 89.69 % higher than state average of 82.34 %. In Brahmapuri, male literacy is around 93.55 % while the female literacy rate is 85.82 %.

73% of the population follows Hinduism and 21% population follows Buddhism. Muslims account for around 4.5%, Christians 0.5%, Sikhs 0.37%, Jains 0.19% and others 0.42%.

Year	Male	Female	Total Population	Change	Religion (%)							
Year	Male	Female	Total Population	Change	Hindu	Muslim	Christian	Sikhs	Buddhist	Jain	Other religions and persuasions	Religion not stated
2001	15957	15250	31207	-	72.503	4.249	0.477	0.352	19.422	0.218	2.256	0.522
2011	18052	17973	36025	0.154	73.071	4.500	0.500	0.369	20.899	0.194	0.419	0.047

== History ==
Bramhapuri was a city in the Satavahana dynasty, with many burnt-brick houses, numerous glass beads and coins. Many bronze objects were excavated from there, many of which are Indian but few were also of Roman and Italian origin, that can be attributed to the Satavahana period.

== Climate ==
The climate here is generally hot and dry whereas in the rainy season it is humid and the rainfall is quite heavy. The temperature in summer goes above 45 °C and in winter drops below 10 °C. In the last few years this town has been listed among the top five hottest cities of India.

Climate data for Bramhapuri (1991–2020, extremes 1956–2020)
Month	Jan	Feb	Mar	Apr	May	Jun	Jul	Aug	Sep	Oct	Nov	Dec	Year
Record high °C (°F)	37.4 (99.3)	39.1 (102.4)	42.5 (108.5)	46.5 (115.7)	48.3 (118.9)	47.7 (117.9)	40.2 (104.4)	38.3 (100.9)	37.6 (99.7)	38.7 (101.7)	39.1 (102.4)	37.2 (99.0)	47.7 (117.9)
Mean daily maximum °C (°F)	29.5 (85.1)	32.6 (90.7)	36.9 (98.4)	40.7 (105.3)	42.9 (109.2)	37.7 (99.9)	31.6 (88.9)	30.6 (87.1)	32.2 (90.0)	33.0 (91.4)	31.7 (89.1)	29.9 (85.8)	34.1 (93.4)
Mean daily minimum °C (°F)	12.9 (55.2)	15.9 (60.6)	20.1 (68.2)	24.9 (76.8)	28.6 (83.5)	26.7 (80.1)	24.8 (76.6)	24.5 (76.1)	24.2 (75.6)	21.3 (70.3)	17.2 (63.0)	13.3 (55.9)	21.0 (69.8)
Record low °C (°F)	0.8 (33.4)	5.1 (41.2)	10.3 (50.5)	12.8 (55.0)	13.4 (56.1)	14.2 (57.6)	13.9 (57.0)	14.0 (57.2)	14.9 (58.8)	7.6 (45.7)	6.2 (43.2)	2.6 (36.7)	0.8 (33.4)
Average rainfall mm (inches)	8.7 (0.34)	12.6 (0.50)	17.9 (0.70)	15.8 (0.62)	20.3 (0.80)	181.3 (7.14)	410.5 (16.16)	379.0 (14.92)	191.3 (7.53)	45.8 (1.80)	11.5 (0.45)	4.7 (0.19)	1,299.4 (51.16)
Average rainy days	0.7	1.1	1.4	1.7	1.6	8.2	15.6	14.8	9.1	2.5	0.5	0.1	57.3
Average relative humidity (%) (at 17:30 IST)	42	39	36	31	27	53	72	77	71	60	51	44	50
Source: India Meteorological Department
