= Amte =

Amte is an Indian surname. Notable people with the surname include:

- Baba Amte (1914–2008), Indian social worker and activist, particularly in serving people with leprosy
- Mandakini Amte, Indian doctor and social worker
- Prakash Amte (born 1948), Indian social worker, husband of Mandakini and son of Baba
- Sheetal Amte (1981–2020), Indian public health expert and physician
