= Dr. Prakash Baba Amte – The Real Hero =

- Theatrical release poster
- Directed by: Samruddhi Porey
- Written by: Samruddhi Porey
- Produced by: Samruddhi Porey, Essel Vision Productions
- Starring: Nana Patekar; Sonali Kulkarni; Mohan Agashe
- Cinematography: Mahesh Anye
- Music by: Rahul Ranade & Aniruddha Wankar; Guru Thakur (lyrics)
- Distributed by: Essel Vision Productions
- Release date: 10 October 2014
- Running time: 137 minutes
- Country: India
- Language: Marathi
- Box office: ₹15 crore (US$1.6 million)

Dr. Prakash Baba Amte – The Real Hero is an Indian Marathi language film starring Nana Patekar, Sonali Kulkarni and Mohan Agashe in lead roles. It is a biopic on the lives of Dr. Prakash Amte, the son of social worker Baba Amte, and his wife Mandakini Amte. The film portrays Dr. Prakash Amte, a doctor and social worker who worked for uplifting the tribal people in the forests of eastern Maharashtra state.

== Release ==
The film was released in Maharashtra with overall positive reviews on 10 October 2014.

== Plot ==
This movie showcases the life of Dr. Prakash Amte, a man who dedicates himself to helping those in society who suffer from disadvantages. He became an inspiration to others by teaching the attitude of self-actualization.

After finishing his medical degree, Prakash's father, Baba Amte, took him on a picnic to Hemalkasa. This was a turning point in Prakash's life. He became distressed to see that, while mankind had reached the moon, there were people who still lived in abject poverty. They used to hunt and sleep under trees. Prakash moved there to treat them and help them by sharing their privations.

Dr. Mandakini and Prakash had been in love since their college days. Leaving her luxurious life behind, she accompanied Prakash without any conditions. This is where the real story begins: in the dense forest of Hemalkasa. They struggle with tribal communities, wild animals, Naxalite insurgents, and corrupt government officials. Today, after 45 years, Hemalkasa has become an example of positive development in the world.

== Cast ==
- Nana Patekar as Prakash Amte
- Sonali Kulkarni as Mandakini Amte
- Mohan Agashe as Baba Amte
- Mayuri Deshmukh
- Tejashri Pradhan as Young Mandakini Amte
- Ashish Chougule
- Vikram Gaikwad
- Bharat Ganeshpure
- Aniruddha Wankar
- Vinayak Patwardhan
- Kunal Gajbhare
- Sushant Kakde
- Sukumar Day
- Prasad Dhakulkar
- Naina Rani
- Krishna Dharme
- williemgc
- Vinod Raut

== Filming ==
The film was shot in locations including Hemalkasa, Mumbai, United States, etc.

== Reception ==
The release clashed with two other Marathi films, Ishq Wala Love and Punha Gondhal Punha Mujra.

The acting prowess of Nana Patekar, Sonali Kulkarni & Mohan Aagashe added more stars to the inspiring story. The Times of India gave it 3.5 stars, calling it a must-watch film with the whole family. It earned ₹7.5 crore (US$780,000) in the first 2 weeks. Dr. Prakash continued its success and collected ₹12 crore (US$1.2 million) within 6 weeks, becoming one of the top hit movies of the year 2014.

Deepa Bhalerao of The Daily Eye wrote "The strength of this film lies in the way it has told the story of exemplary people in a beautiful way. The fact that I had to see this movie sitting in the middle of the second row of a hall in a multiplex as there were no tickets available for the next five days, says something. Don’t miss this heart-warming piece that lingers in the mind, long after it is over."

== Awards ==
Filmfare Marathi Awards

- Best Film (won)
- Best Actor – Nana Patekar (won)
- Best Actress – Sonali Kulkarni (won)
