= Anandwan =

Social organization in Maharashtra, India

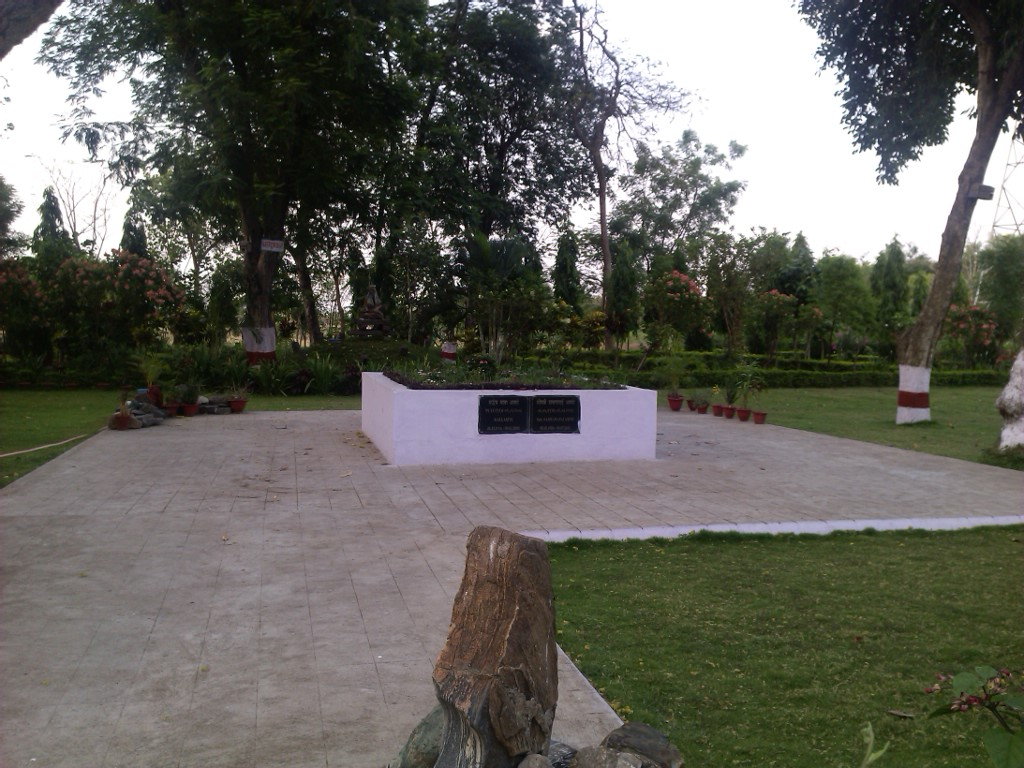
Anandwan memorial

Anandwan literally, Forest of happiness, located around 5 kilometers from Warora in Chandrapur district in the state of Maharashtra, India, is an ashram and a community rehabilitation centre which was mainly started for leprosy patients and the disabled from downtrodden sections of society. It was founded in 1949 by noted social activist Baba Amte. The project is run by the organisation Maharogi Seva Samiti, and even being located one of the most backward districts of Central India -Chandrapur, has built livelihood capabilities of thousands of downtrodden people, persons with disabilities like leprosy, orthopedically handicapped, vision and hearing impaired and primitive tribal members since 1949. Two of its other projects are Lok Biradari Prakalp and Somnath, a village for cured leprosy patients.

Baba Amte developed Anandwan to be a self-contained ashram (which could be described as "a kibbutz for the sick"). Today residents are self-sufficient in terms of basic subsistence. In addition the ashram has various home-based, small-scale industry units run by the residents that generate income to cover additional requirements.

Baba Amte also shaped Anandwan as an environmentally aware community to practice energy utilization, waste recycling and minimizing use of natural resources that might otherwise lead to their depletion.

Anandwan today has two hospitals, a college, an orphanage, a school for the blind, a school for the deaf and a technical wing. Dr. Vikas Amte, Baba Amte's elder son, is the chief functionary at Anandwan. He undertook various experiments in Anandwan regarding rehabilitation which have been mentioned in a book titled 'Anandwan Prayogwan'.

== Books ==
A book titled 'Anandwan Prayogwan' has been written by Dr. Vikas Amte which describes different experiments undertaken at Anadwan.

== Additional Works ==
In later years the samiti managing Anandwan, also added two projects under the Lok Biradari Prakalp at Somnath in Mul tehsil of Chandrapur district in 1967 and at Hemalkasa, which is looked after by Prakash and Mandakini Amte, both doctors, and their sons Digant and Aniket and their wives Anagha and Sameeksha. in Bhamragad tehsil of Gadchiroli district in 1973.

== See also ==
- Baba Amte
- Prakash Amte
- Mandakini Amte
- Sheetal Amte
