= Baba Amte =

Indian social worker, reformer and activist (1914–2008)

Abhayasadhak Baba Amte
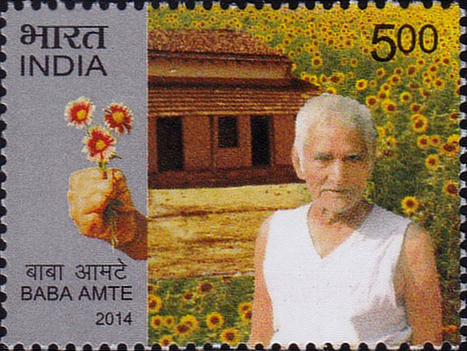
- Baba Amte on a 2014 stamp of India
- Born: 26 December 1914; Hinganghat, Central Provinces and Berar, British India (present-day Maharashtra, India)
- Died: 9 February 2008 (aged 93); Anandwan, Chandrapur district, Maharashtra, India
- Education: B.A. LL.B.
- Spouse: Sadhana Amte
- Children: Prakash Amte; Vikas Amte
- Awards: Padma Shri (1971), Ramon Magsaysay Award (1985), Padma Vibhushan (1986), United Nations Prize in the Field of Human Rights (1988), Dr. Ambedkar International Award (1999), Gandhi Peace Prize(1999), Templeton Prize (1990), Right Livelihood Award (1991), Maharashtra Bhushan (2004)

Signature
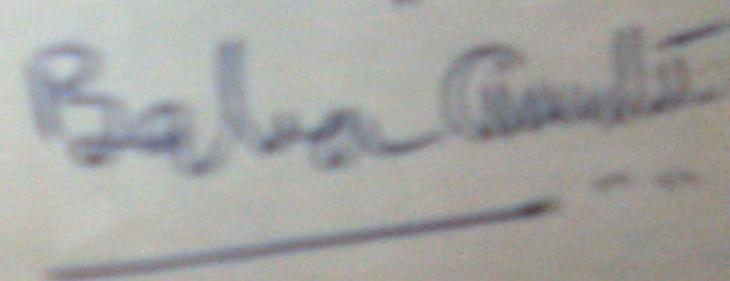

Murlidhar Devidas Amte, popularly known as Baba Amte, (26 December 1914 – 9 February 2008) was an Indian social worker and social activist known particularly for his work for the rehabilitation and empowerment of people suffering from leprosy. He has received numerous awards and prizes including the Padma Vibhushan, the Dr. Ambedkar International Award, the Gandhi Peace Prize, the Ramon Magsaysay Award, the Templeton Prize and the Jamnalal Bajaj Award. He is also known as the modern Gandhi of India.

== Early life ==
Murlidhar Devidas "Baba" Amte was born in an affluent Deshastha Brahmin family on 26 December 1914 in the city of Hinganghat in Maharashtra. His father, Devidas Amte, was a colonial government officer working for the district administration and revenue collection departments. Murlidhar Amte acquired the nickname Baba in his childhood. His wife, Sadhanatai Amte, explains that he came to be known as Baba not because "he was regarded as a saint or a holy person, but because his parents addressed him by that name."

Amte was the eldest of eight children. As the eldest son of a wealthy land owner, he had an idyllic childhood, filled with hunting and sports. By the time he was fourteen, he owned his own gun and hunted bear and deer. When he was old enough to drive, he was given a Singer Sports car with cushions covered with panther skin. Though he was born in a wealthy family he was always aware of the class inequality that prevailed in Indian society. "There is a certain callousness in families like my family," he used to say. "They put up strong barriers so as to avoid seeing the misery in the outside world and I rebelled against it."

== Dedicated works ==
Trained in law, he developed a successful legal practice in Wardha. He soon became involved in the Indian independence movement and, in 1942, began working as a defense lawyer for Indian leaders imprisoned by the colonial government for their involvement in the Quit India movement. He spent some time at Sevagram, at the ashram started by Mahatma Gandhi and became a follower of Gandhism. He practiced Gandhism by engaging in yarn spinning using a charkha and wearing khadi. When Gandhi came to know that Dr. Amte had defended a girl from the lewd taunts of some British soldiers, Gandhi gave him the name – Abhay Sadhak (Fearless Seeker of Truth).

However, one day his encounter with a leprosy patient Tulshiram, who was a veritable living corpse, filled him with fear. Amte, who had until that point never feared anything and had bravely fought British soldiers to save the honour of a girl, quivered with fright at Tulshiram's plight. Thereafter, Amte strove to establish the thought that leprosy patients could only be truly helped when the society is freed of "Leprosy of the mind" - the fear of the disease, and wrong interpretations thereof. To dispel this entrenched fear, he once injected himself with bacilli from a leprosy patient, to prove that the ailment was not highly contagious as was the belief prevailing at the time. In those days, people with leprosy suffered a social stigma and the Indian society disowned these people. But Baba Amte and his wife used to prioritise the care and treatment and mainstreaming those affected by the dreaded disease of leprosy and lived amongst the affected and ensured that they got exemplary medical care which ended the scourge of the disease for them. For the rehabilitated and cured patients he arranged vocational training and small-scale manufacturing of handicrafts and got things crafted by them. He struggled and tried to remove the stigma and ignorance surrounding the treatment of leprosy as a disease.

Amte founded three ashrams for treatment and rehabilitation of leprosy patients, disabled people and people from marginalised sections of general society in Maharashtra. On 15 August 1949, he and his wife Sadhna Amte started a leprosy hospital in Anandvan under a tree. The leprosy patients were provided with medical care and a life of dignity engaged in agriculture and various small and medium industries like handicrafts. In 1973, Amte founded the Lok Biradari Prakalp to work for the Madia Gond tribal people of Gadchiroli District. Baba Amte also involved in other social cause initiatives like, in year 1985 he launched the first Knit India Mission for peace-at 72 years he walked from Kanyakumari to Kashmir, a distance of more than 3000 miles, to inspire unity among Indian people and organised second march three years later travelling over 1800 miles from Assam to Gujarat. He also participated in Narmada Bachao Andolan in year 1990, leaving Anandwan and lived on banks of Narmada for seven years.

Amte devoted his life to many other social causes, most notably the Quit India movement and attempting to raise public awareness on the importance of ecological balance, wildlife preservation and the Narmada Bachao Andolan. The Indian Government awarded Baba Amte with a Padma Shri in 1971.

== Dedicated works of family members ==
Amte married Indu Ghuleshastri (later called Sadhanatai Amte). She participated in her husband's social work with equal dedication. Their two sons, Vikas Amte and Prakash Amte, and daughters-in-law, Mandakini and Bharati, are doctors. All four dedicated their lives to social work and causes similar to those of the senior Amte. Prakash and his wife Mandakini run a school and a hospital at Hemalkasa village in the underprivileged district of Gadchiroli in Maharashtra among the Madia Gond tribe, as well as an orphanage for injured wild animals, including a lion and some leopards. She left her governmental medical and moved to Hemalkasa to start the projects after they married. Their two sons, Dr. Digant and Aniket also dedicated their lives to the same causes. In 2008, Prakash and Mandakini received the Magsaysay Award for Community Leadership.

Amte's elder son Vikas and his wife Bharati run the hospital at Anandwan and co-ordinate operations with satellite projects. Anandwan has a university, an orphanage, and schools for the blind and the deaf. The Anandwan ashram is self-sufficient and has over 5,000 residents. Amte later founded "Somnath" and "Ashokwan" ashrams for people suffering from leprosy.

== Gandhism ==
Amte followed Gandhi's way of life and led a spartan life. He wore khadi clothes made from the looms at Anandwan. He believed in Gandhi's concept of a self-sufficient village industry that empowers seemingly helpless people, and successfully brought his ideas into practice at Anandwan. Using non-violent means, he played an important role in the struggle for the independence of India. Amte also used Gandhi's principles to fight against corruption, mismanagement, and poor, shortsighted planning in the government. However, Amte never disowned God. He used to say that if there are hundred thousands of universes then God must be very busy. Let us do our work on our own.

== Narmada Bachao Andolan with Medha Patkar ==
In 1990, Amte left Anandwan for a while to live along the Narmada River and joined Narmada Bachao Andolan ("Save Narmada") movement one of whose popular leaders was Medha Patkar, which fought against both unjust displacement of local inhabitants and damage to the environment due to the construction of the Sardar Sarovar dam on the Narmada river.

== Death ==
Amte died at Anandwan on 9 February 2008 in Maharashtra of age-related illnesses. By choosing to get buried rather than be cremated he followed the principles he preached as environmentalist and social reformer.

== Awards ==
- Padma Shri, 1971
- Ramon Magsaysay Award, 1985

Citation: "In electing MURLIDHAR DEVIDAS AMTE to receive the 1985 Ramon Magsaysay Award for Public Service, the Board of Trustees recognizes his work-oriented rehabilitation of Indian leprosy patients and other handicapped outcasts."

- Padma Vibhushan, 1986
- United Nations Prize in the Field of Human Rights, 1988
- Rashtriya Bhushan, 1978: FIE Foundation Ichalkaranji (India)
- Jamnalal Bajaj Award, 1979 for Constructive Work
- N.D. Diwan Award, 1980: National Society for Equal Opportunities for the 'Handicapped' (NASEOH), Bombay
- Ramshastri Award, 1983: Ramshastri Prabhune Foundation, Maharashtra, India
- Indira Gandhi Memorial Award, 1985: Government of Madhya Pradesh for outstanding social service
- Raja Ram Mohan Roy Award, 1986: Delhi
- Fr. Maschio Platinum Jubilee Award, 1987: Bombay
- G.D. Birla International Award, 1988: For outstanding contribution to humanism
- Templeton Prize, 1990 [Baba Amte and Charles Birch (Emeritus professor of University of Sydney) were jointly awarded the prize in 1990]
- Mahadeo Balwant Natu Puraskar, 1991, Pune, Maharashtra
- Adivasi Sewak Award, 1991, Government of Maharashtra
- Kusumagraj Puraskar, 1991
- Dr. Babasaheb Ambedkar Dalit Mitra Award, 1992, Government of Maharashtra
- Shri Nemichand Shrishrimal Award, 1994
- Fr. Tong Memorial Award, 1995, Voluntary Health Association of India
- Kushta Mitra Puraskar, 1995: Vidarbha Maharogi Sewa Mandal, Amravati, Maharashtra
- Bhai Kanhaiya Award, 1997: Sri Guru Harkrishan Education Trust, Bhatinda, Punjab
- Manav Sewa Award, 1997: Young Men's Gandhian Association, Rajkot, Gujarat
- Sarthi Award, 1997, Nagpur, Maharashtra
- Mahatma Gandhi Charitable Trust Award, 1997, Nagpur, Maharashtra
- Gruhini Sakhi Sachiv Puraskar, 1997, Gadima Pratishthan, Maharashtra
- Kumar Gandharva Puraskar, 1998
- Apang Mitra Puraskar, 1998, Helpers of the Handicapped, Kolhapur, Maharashtra
- Bhagwan Mahaveer Award, 1998, Chennai
- Diwaliben Mohanlal Mehta Award, 1998, Mumbai
- Justice K. S. Hegde Foundation Award, 1998, Karnataka
- Baya Karve Award, 1998, Pune, Maharashtra
- Savitribai Phule Award, 1998, Government of Maharashtra
- Federation of Indian Chambers of Commerce and Industry Award, 1988: FICCI, for outstanding achievements in training and placement of disabled persons
- Satpaul Mittal Award, 1998, Nehru Sidhant Kendra Trust, Ludhiana, Punjab
- Adivasi Sevak Puraskar, 1998, Government of Maharashtra
- Gandhi Peace Prize, 1999
- Dr. Ambedkar International Award for Social Change, 1999, Government of India
- Maharashtra Bhushan Award, 2004, Government of Maharashtra
- Bharathvasa award, 2008
- On 26 December 2018, search engine Google commemorated him on his 104th birthday, with a google doodle.

=== Honorary titles ===
- D.Litt., Tata Institute of Social Sciences, Mumbai, India
- D.Litt., 1980: Nagpur University, Nagpur, India
- Krishi Ratna, 1981: Hon. Doctorate, PKV Agricultural University, Akola, Maharashtra, India
- D.Litt., 1985–86: Pune University, Pune, India
- Desikottama, 1988: Hon. Doctorate, Visva-Bharati University, Santiniketan, West Bengal, India
- Mahatma Gandhi had conferred on Amte the title Abhayasadhak ("A Fearless Aspirant") for his involvement in the Indian independence movement.

== Quotes ==
- "I don't want to be a great leader; I want to be a man who goes around with a little oilcan and when he sees a breakdown, offers his help. To me, the man who does that is greater than any holy man in saffron-coloured robes. The mechanic with the oilcan: that is my ideal in life." (Self-description given to British journalist Graham Turner)
- "I took up leprosy work not to help anyone, but to overcome that fear in my life. That it worked out good for others was a by-product. But the fact is I did it to overcome fear."

== See also ==
- Anandwan
- Dr. Prakash Baba Amte – The Real Hero film
- Mandakini Amte
- Sheetal Amte
