= Sheetal Amte =

Indian public health expert (1981–2020)

- Born: 26 January 1981; Warora, Maharashtra, India
- Died: 30 November 2020 (aged 39); Chandrapur, Maharashtra, India
- Education: Government Medical College (Nagpur) (MBBS)
- Occupations: Doctor, public health expert, disability specialist, social worker
- Known for: CEO of the Maharogi Sewa Samiti, Warora
- Spouse: Gautam Karajgi
- Children: 1
- Website: www.sheetalamtekarajgi.com

Sheetal Amte (26 January 1981 – 30 November 2020), also known by the name Sheetal Amte-Karajgi after her marriage, was an Indian public health expert, disability specialist and social entrepreneur. She was chief executive officer and board member of a non-profit organisation, Maharogi Sewa Samiti, which focuses on helping people disadvantaged by leprosy.

== Life ==
Amte was the daughter of Vikas Amte and Bharati Amte, and the granddaughter of Baba Amte, who founded a rehabilitation center for individuals affected by leprosy at Anandwan, in the state of Maharashtra, where she lived on campus. She also founded the Maharogi Sewa Samiti (MSS), Warora, and served as its chief executive officer and board member, which provided a range of health care, rehabilitation, education, agriculture, and economic empowerment programmes. Maharogi Sewa Samiti has contributed significantly in generating livelihood capacities for thousands of marginalised individuals, particularly those living with conditions such as leprosy, physical impairments, and sensory limitations, along with the tribal populace. Since 1949, she operated from one of the most backward districts of Central India, Chandrapur.

She studied medicine and became a physician and also completed a master's degree in social entrepreneurship from Tata Institute of Social Sciences (TISS), and joined her family working at Anandwan to continue her grandfather's vision; her brother Kaustubh is an accountant for Anandwan and her uncle Prakash Amte and aunt Mandakini Amte are also physicians at the community. She also studied leadership from the Harvard Kennedy School.

She helped to secure the financial assistance of the Tech Mahindra Foundation to provide food for children in Anandwan schools. She also led the installation of solar power panels at the community, resulting in Maharogi Sewa Samiti receiving an award for Innovative Energy Project of the Year 2016 from the Association of Energy Engineers, and intended to incorporate more smart technology into the community in future to make Anandwan a smart village. Dr. Sheetal was working as a fellow of the World Innovation Organisation, an initiative from World Summit on Innovation and United Nations.

== Recognition ==
2016:

- Named a Young Global Leader by the World Economic Forum.
- Selected as Member of World Economic Forum Expert Network on Humanitarian Response.
- Selected as a United Nations Innovation Ambassador and an advisor to i4P (Innovations for Peace).
- Awarded INK fellowship and Rotary Vocational Excellence Award.

== Death ==
On 30 November 2020, she died by suicide. She was also a painter and is survived by her husband Gautam Karajgi and a seven-year-old son Sharvil.
