= Government Medical College and Hospital, Nagpur =

Medical College in Maharashtra, India

- Motto: Knowledge, Patience, Service
- Type: Education and research institution
- Established: 1947; 79 years ago
- Affiliations: Maharashtra University of Health Sciences, NMC
- Dean: Dr. Raj Gajbhiye
- Location: Nagpur, Maharashtra, India
- Campus: 196 acres (0.8 km^{2})
- Website: gmcnagpur.org

Government Medical College and Hospital, Nagpur is a medical college located in Ajni which is part of South Nagpur, Maharashtra, India. It was founded in 1947 and was affiliated with Rashtrasant Tukadoji Maharaj Nagpur University from 1947 to 1997, and subsequently Maharashtra University of Health Sciences (MUHS).

== History ==
The architect for the project was D.G.Karajgaonkar and Sir Sobha Singh was the contractor. Within a year, the Nurses’ Hostel and present Hostel No.1 building was ready for the occupancy in the year 1949 itself.

== Location ==
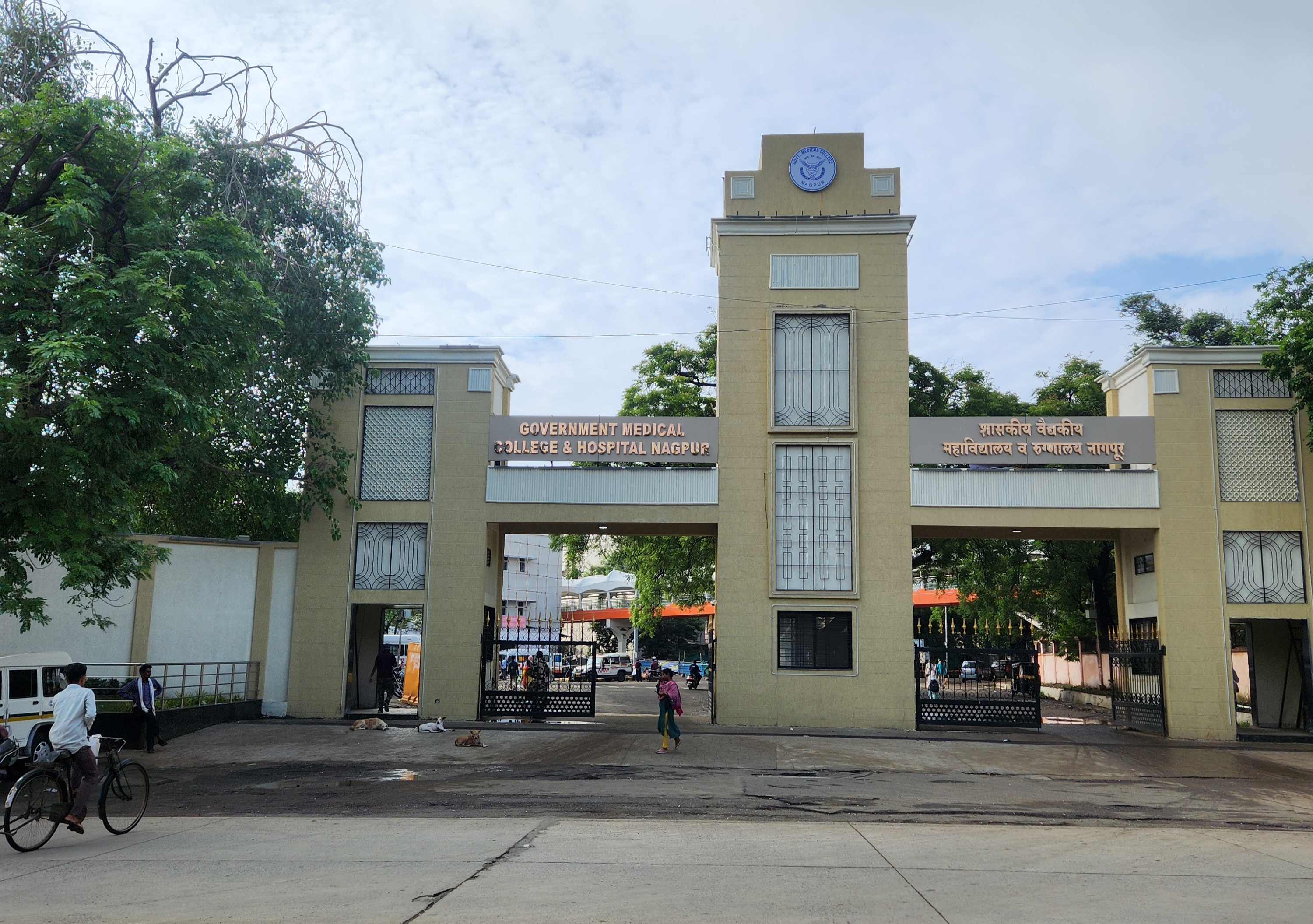
Government Medical College and Hospital, Nagpur

The college is located in Ajni in South Nagpur. The campus is stretched over an area of 196 acres. Government Medical College (GMC), Nagpur is also known to have the largest campus among all government medical colleges in Asia.

== Academics ==
Government Medical College(GMC), Nagpur has various academic departments, with specialized laboratories and research centers.

=== Departments ===
- Anatomy
- Anesthesiology
- Biochemistry
- Dermatology-Venereology-Leprology
- Otorhinolaryngology (ENT)
- Forensic Pathology
- Medicine
- Microbiology
- Obstetrics and Gynaecology
- Occupational Therapy
- Ophthalmology
- Orthopedics
- Pathology
- Pediatrics
- Pharmacology
- Physiology
- Physiotherapy
- Plastic-Maxillofacial-Reconstructive surgery
- Pulmonology
- Preventive Medicine and Social Medicine
- Surgery
- Radiation Therapy and Oncology
- Radio Diagnosis
- Radiology

== Laboratories and Research Facilities ==
- The Department of Pathology at GMC Nagpur encompasses sub-specialties including haematology, cytology, histopathology and maintains a fully functioning blood bank laboratory.
- The Department of Microbiology maintains specialized laboratories for bacteriology, serology, mycology, virology, parasitology and immunology, enabling both diagnostic services and research in infectious diseases.
- The Department of Physiology is one of the oldest at the college, established at the college’s inception in 1947, and has contributed to teaching, basic medical research and training of pre-clinical students.

== Recognition ==
The college is recognized by the National Medical Commission, New Delhi.

== Notable alumni ==
- Shrikant Jichkar, former member of the Indian National Congress.
- Prakash Amte, social activist, Magsaysay awardee, director of Lok Biradari Prakalp.
- Mandakini Amte, social activist, Magsaysay awardee.
- Zulekha Daud, a renowned physician-turned-entrepreneur and Pravasi Bharatiya Samman awardee.
- Sheetal Amte, Indian public health expert, disability specialist and social entrepreneur.
- V. Maitreyan, an Indian oncologist and politician from Tamil Nadu.
- Ranjit Patil, orthopedic surgeon and politician from Maharashtra.
- Abhay and Rani Bang, social activist and researcher working in the field of community health.
- Sunil Deshmukh, former radiologist and politician from Maharashtra.
- Ravindra and Smita Kolhe, an social activist & doctors
- Vikas Mahatme, ophthalmologist, social entrepreneur, former member of the Parliament
- Harminder Dua, ophthalmologist discovered the 6th layer of cornea the DUA's layer.
- Praveen Gedam, indian civil servant
