= Maharashtra Bhushan =

Highest civilian award by the Government Of Maharashtra State

Maharashtra Bhushan Award
- Maharashtra State highest civilian award for outstanding individual achievements
- Sponsored by: Govt. of Maharashtra
- Reward: ₹ 25,00,000/-
- First award: 1996
- Final award: 2024

The Maharashtra Bhushan is the highest civilian award presented annually by the Government of Maharashtra State in India.

When the Shivsena- BJP alliance came to power in the state in 1995, it proposed to institute this award. The Maharashtra Bhushan was first awarded in 1996. It was initially conferred every year in the fields of Literature, Art, Sport, and Science. Later the fields of Social Work, Journalism, and Public Administration and Health Services were included. The award is presented for outstanding achievement in the respective field.

== Prize and selection ==
At present, the award carries a cash prize of ₹ 2.5 million, a memento and a citation. The winners are selected by a committee appointed by the Government of Maharashtra.

== Recipients ==
The recipients of the Maharashtra Bhushan award are as follows

Year	Name	Image	Field	Ref
1996	Purushottam Laxman Deshpande		Literature	
1997	Lata Mangeshkar		Music	
1998	Sunil Gavaskar		Sports	
1999	Vijay P. Bhatkar		Science	
2001	Sachin Tendulkar		Sports	
2002	Bhimsen Joshi		Arts, Music	
2003	Abhay and Rani Bang		Medical Services	
2004	Baba Amte		Social Work	
2005	Raghunath Mashelkar		Science	
2006	Ratan Tata		Public Administration	
2007	Ramrao Krishnarao Patil (posthumous)		Public Administration	
2008	Nana Dharmadhikari (posthumous)		Social Work	
2008	Mangesh Padgaonkar		Literature	
2009	Sulochana Latkar		Arts, Cinema	
2010	Jayant Narlikar		Science	
2011	Anil Kakodkar		Science	
2015	Babasaheb Purandare		Literature	
2021	Asha Bhosle		Music	
2022	Appasaheb Dharmadhikari		Social Work	
2023	Ashok Saraf		Arts, Cinema	
2024	Ram V. Sutar		Arts	

== Trivia ==
- Ramrao Krishnarao Patil and Nana Dharmadhikari only two to receive Maharashtra Bhushan posthumously
- Lata Mangeshkar and Asha Bhosle only two sisters to receive Maharashtra Bhushan.
- Nana Dharmadhikari and Appasaheb Dharmadhikari are only father and son to receive Maharashtra Bhushan.
- Abhay and Rani Bang are Only Couple to receive Maharashtra Bhushan
