= Nana Dharmadhikari =

Indian spiritual leader (1922–2008)

Nanasaheb Dharmadhikari
- नानासाहेब धर्माधिकारी
- Born: Narayan Vishnu Dharmadhikari; 1 March 1922; Revdanda, Maharashtra, India
- Died: 8 July 2008 (aged 86); Pune, Maharashtra, India
- Spouse: Sharada Devi Dharmadhikari
- Children: Dattatreya Dharmadhikari; Shrikrishna Dharmadhikari
- Awards: National Integration Award (By Seroc India) (1999) Doctor of Literature (2004) Maharashtra Bhushan Award (2008)
- Website: dsndp.com

Narayan Vishnu Dharmadhikari (1 March 1922 – 8 July 2008), popularly known as Dr Shri Nanasaheb Dharmadhikari was an Indian spiritual master, social reformer and propagator of Hindu spiritual literature. He initiated his social movement at Revdanda, Raigad district, India.

The primary mission of his movement was to encourage rationality and eradicate superstition through the elimination of orthodox customs and traditions prevalent among some sections of Indian society.

He is said to have begun his movement with only 5 followers. During the first days of his movement, Dharmadhikari encouraged his followers to undertake pilgrimage to the most prominent Hindu holy towns in India. There, he instructed his followers to observe the existing social conditions. He believed that these places were littered with sins.

After pilgrimage, Dharmadhikari founded an organization named Shree Samarth Prasadik Aadhyatmik Seva Samiti. He was an active proponent of the philosophy of the 17th-century Indian saint Samarth Ramdas, who wrote philosophical texts such as Dasbodh, Manache Shlok, and Atmaram. Dharmadhikari has millions of followers around the world. He was awarded by numerous government and social organizations in recognition of his work. In 2008, the Government of Maharashtra conferred upon him the Maharashtra Bhushan Award, the highest civilian award in the state.

Nanasaheb Dharmadhikari was born to a family bearing Shandilya as the last name. Around 350 years ago, his ancestors were awarded the title of Dharmadhikari (authority on Dharma) by the 17th-century Maratha naval chief Kanhoji Angre. Dharmadhikari derived inspiration from the philosophical text, Shrimat Dasbodh (or simply Dasbodh). After several years of spiritual research and inquiry, he started a unique social reformation movement on 8 October 1943, also the occasion of Vijayadashami or Dussehra. As part of the movement, he delivered spiritual discourses known as Nirupan on a weekly basis. These lectures were mostly based on Dasbodh and other philosophical texts. Only seven people attended his discourses during the first few months and over time, the attendance numbers grew exponentially. His support base eventually expanded to more than 10 million. Currently, lecture programs known as Shri Baithak (श्रीबैठक)) take place in multiple countries around the world including the UAE, Britain, Singapore, Australia, Nigeria and Iran among others. During the initial phase of his movement, Dharmadhikari would walk long distances of up to 70 km to deliver his lectures. Along with lectures, he also conducted counseling sessions to people.

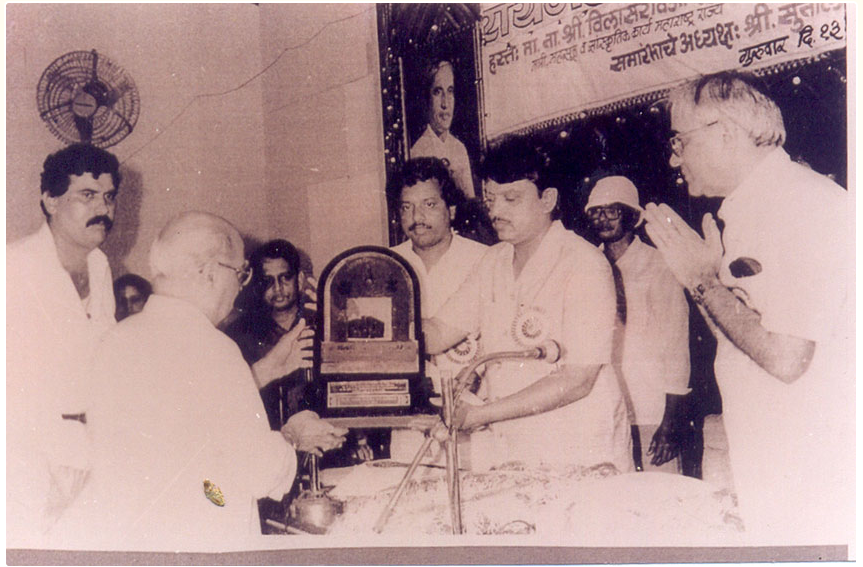
Nanasaheb Dharmadhikari receiving the Raigad Mitra Award, 13 May 1993

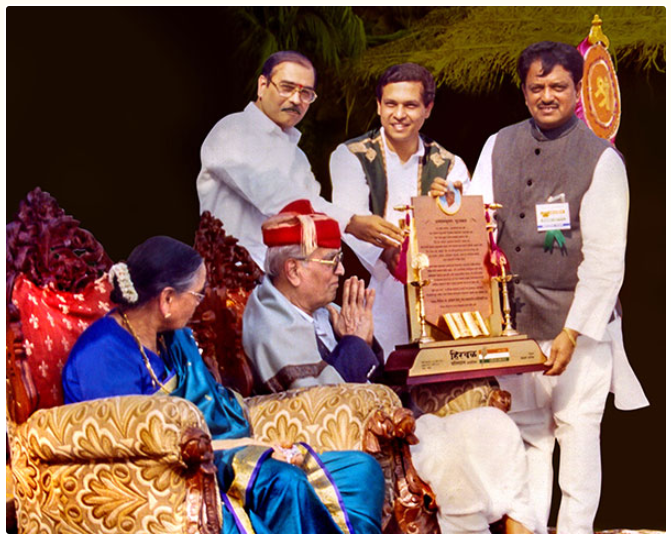
Nanasaheb Dharmadhikari receiving the Samaj Bhushan Award, 1 March 2002

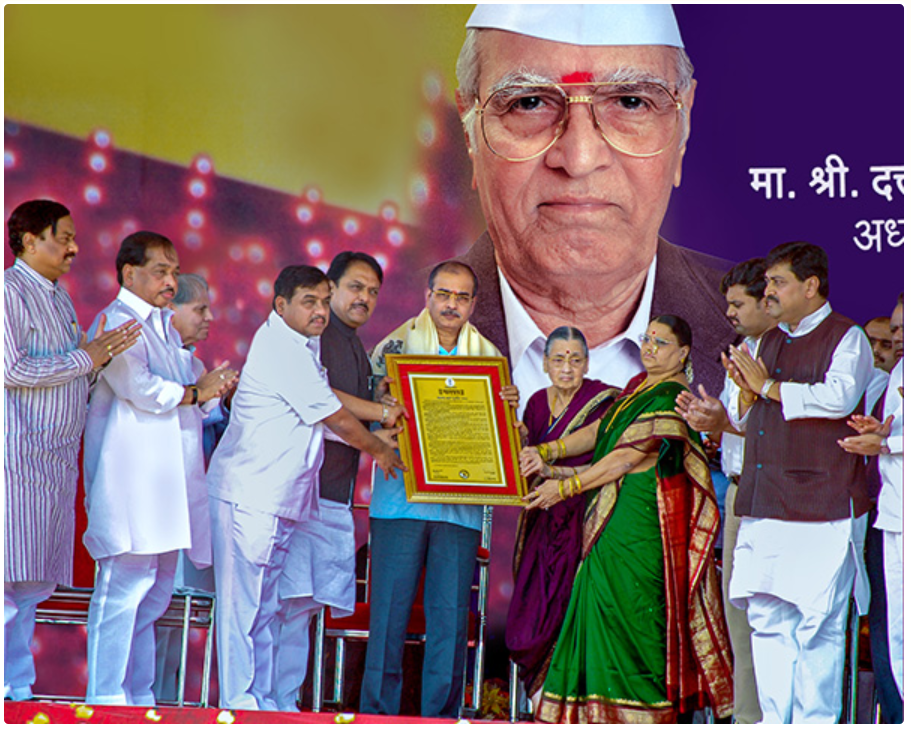
Appasaheb Dharmadhikari receiving the posthumous Maharashtra Bhushan Award on 25 November 2008 on behalf of his father, Nanasaheb Dharmadhikari
