= Ravindra and Smita Kolhe =

Indian social activists

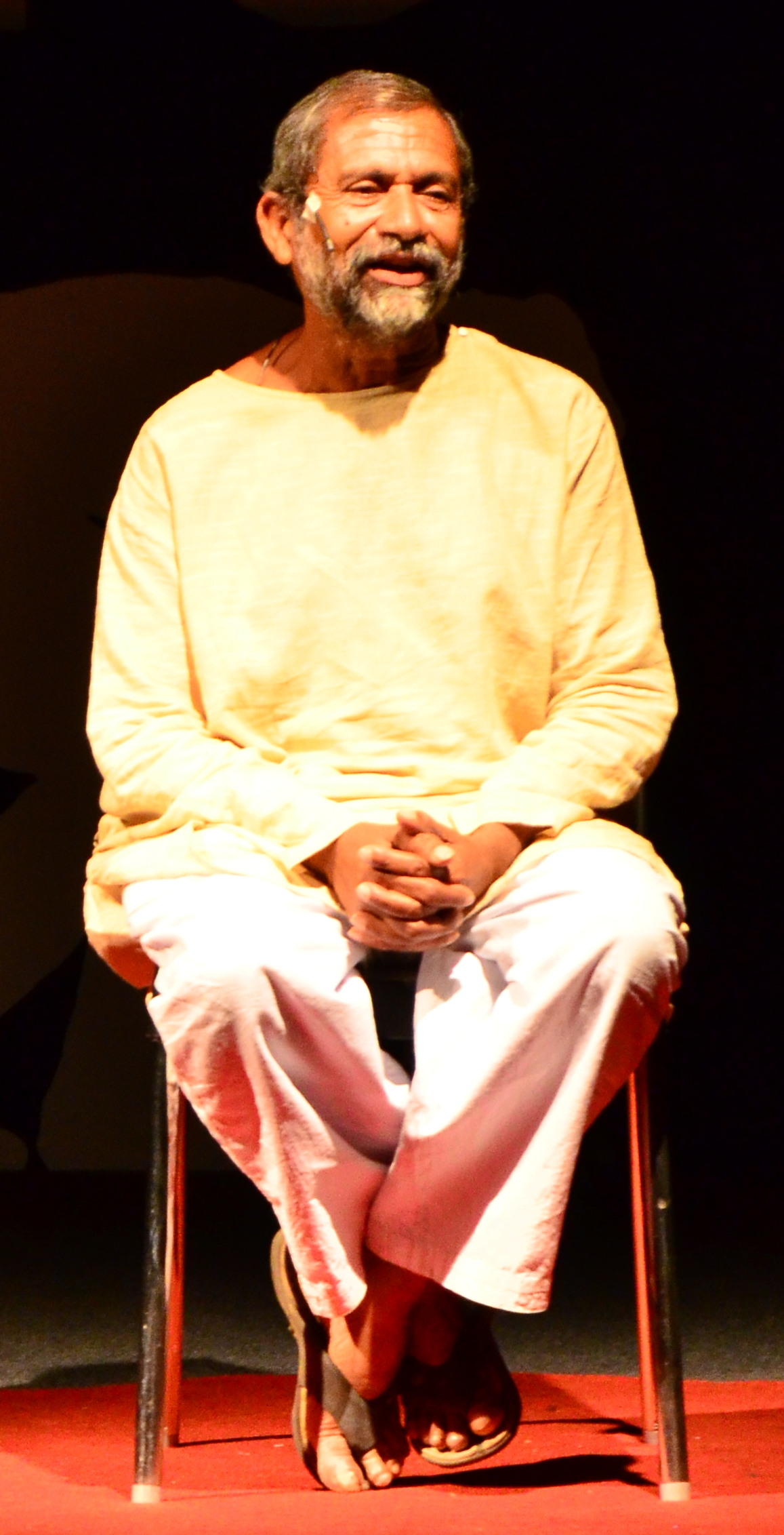
Ravindra Kolhe speaking at TEDxGEC: Inquilab in 2019

Ravindra Kolhe and Smita Kolhe are Indian social activists and doctors. They work for the tribal people in remote village areas of Bairagarh in Melghat region of Amravati district in Maharashtra. Ravindra Kolhe completed his MBBS in 1985 and MD in 1987 from Government Medical College, Nagpur. He has been actively working in Bairagarh area since 1985. He married Smita, also a doctor specializing in Ayurveda and Homeopathy, and together continued their work. They charged a nominal fee of ₹1 (1.2¢ US) for treatment and also run a Government ration shop. Apart from medicinal help, the couple also makes general awareness campaigns for the tribals. The works of Kolhe couple has resulted in reduction of infant mortality rate from 200 per 1000 to 40 and pre-school mortality rate from 400 per 1000 to 100. In 2019, the couple received Padma Shri, India's fourth highest civilian award.
