= Appasaheb Dharmadhikari =

Indian social worker

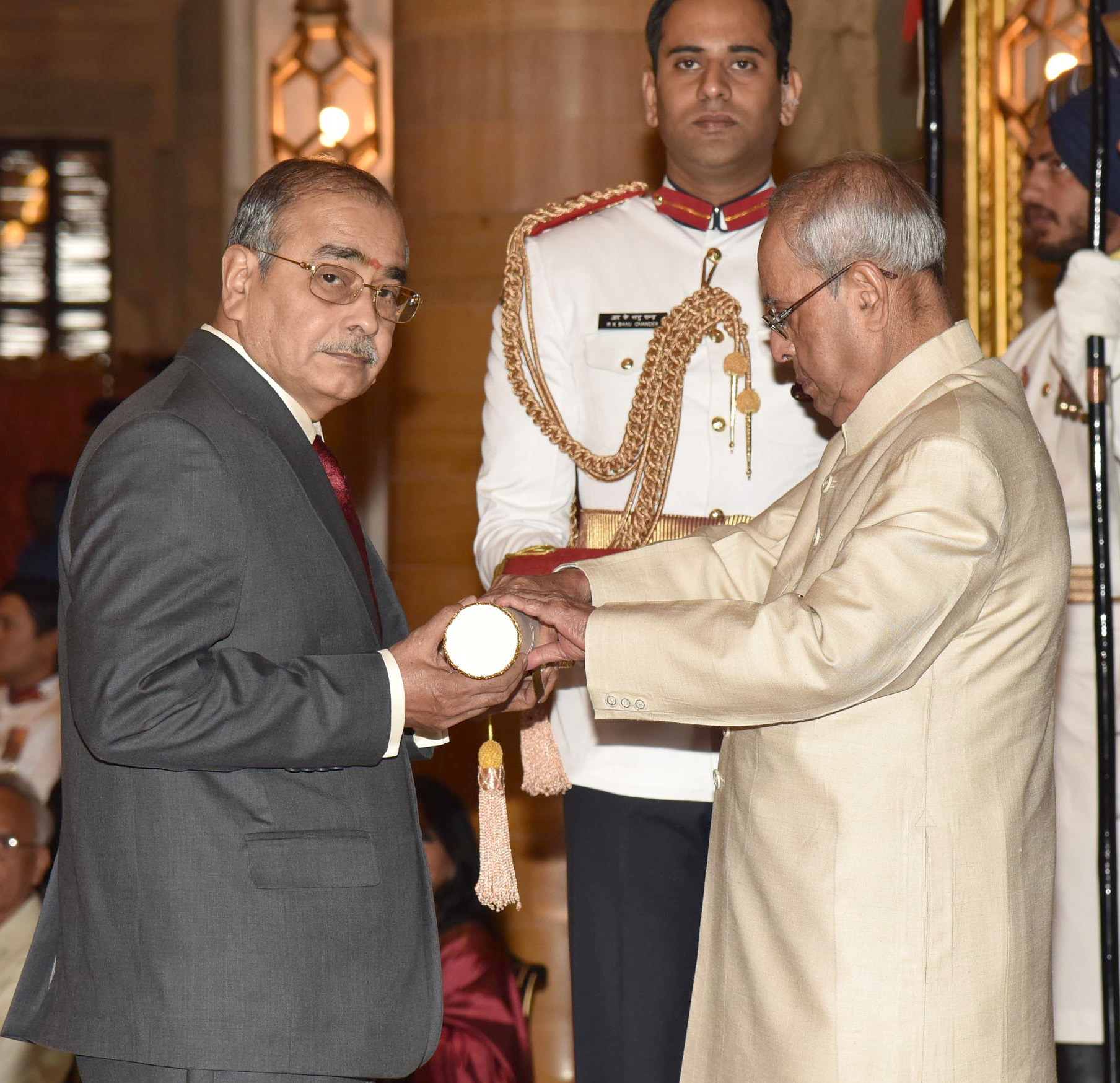
- Born: 14 May 1946 (age 79); Revdanda
- Other names: Shri. Dattatreya Narayan Dharmadhikari
- Occupations: Social Worker, Reformer
- Known for: afforestation, blood donation and medical camps, shunning dowry system, empowering women and tribals, eradicating superstitions, conducting de-addiction, national integration and preaching to the masses on traditional and religious values.
- Father: Dr. Nanasaheb Dharmadhikari
- Honours: Padma Shri (2017), Maharashtra Bhushan (2023)

Appasaheb Dharmadhikari, also known as Dattatreya Narayan Dharmadhikari, (born 14 May 1946) is an Indian social worker from Maharashtra. Following footsteps of Dr. Nanasaheb Dharmadhikari, Appasaheb has been instrumental in conducting various tree plantations, blood donation camps, free medical camps, job fairs, cleanliness drives, superstition eradication, de-addiction centers, etc. in Maharashtra. In 2014, he was conferred with Doctor of Letters by Dr D Y Patil University, Nerul. In 2017, he was awarded Padma Shri, India's fourth highest civilian honour, and Maharashtra Bhushan award for year 2022.
