= Hemalkasa =

Village in Maharashtra

- village
- Location in Maharashtra, India Hemalkasa (India)
- Coordinates: 19.41°N 80.55°E
- Country: India
- State: Maharashtra
- District: Gadchiroli district

Languages
  - Official: Marathi
- Time zone: UTC+5:30 (IST)
- PIN: 442710

Hemalkasa is a village in the Bhamragad taluka of Gadchiroli district in Maharashtra State, India.

It belongs to the Madia Gond community.

Hemalkasa is where the famous Magsaysay Award-winner couple Dr. Prakash Baba Amte and Dr. Mandakini Amte manage the Lok Biradari Prakalp project.

Chandrapur Railway Station (CD): This is the closest major railway station to Hemalkasa.

Gadchiroli: From Chandrapur, you can take a bus to Gadchiroli, which is a district headquarters.

Aheri: From Gadchiroli, you can get another bus to Aheri.

Bhamragad: Finally, take a bus from Aheri to Bhamragad, which is close to Hemalkasa.
