= Abhay and Rani Bang =

Indian social activists and researchers

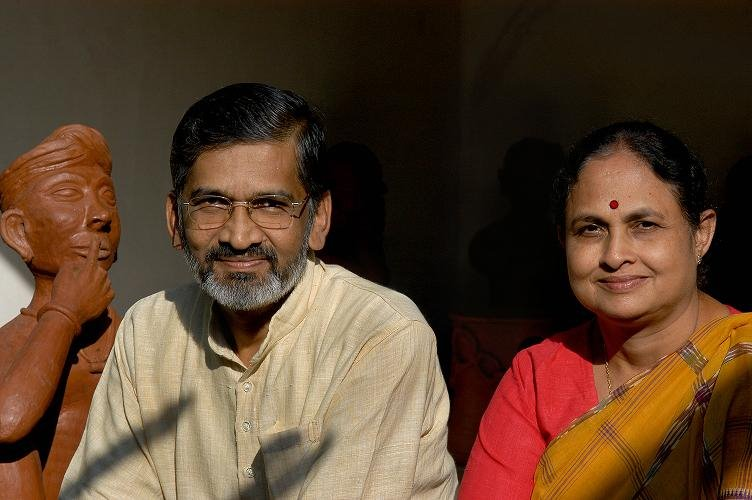
- Born: Wardha and Chandrapur, Maharashtra, India
- Education: Government Medical College and Hospital, Nagpur (MBBS, MD); Johns Hopkins University (MPH)
- Occupation: Social activists
- Known for: Social work, community health, addiction recovery, home based newborn care
- Children: Anand Bang (elder), Amrut Bang (younger)
- Awards: Maharashtra Bhushan Award (2003); MacArthur Foundation International Award (2006); National Award for Women's Development through Application of Science & Technology (2008); Jamnalal Bajaj Award (2006); Inaugural Distinguished Alumni Award, Department of International Health, Bloomberg School of Public Health, Johns Hopkins University, US (2013); National Award of the Indian Council of Medical Research for Outstanding Research in Community Medicine
- Honors: Padma Shri

Abhay and Rani Bang are Indian social activists and community health researchers who work in the Gadchiroli district of Maharashtra, India. They are known for developing initiatives and programs focused on neonatal care, reproductive and maternal health, disease prevention and treatment, and rural development. Their work has been replicated in several developing countries and adopted by the World Health Organization (WHO) and UNICEF. In 2024, they were awarded the Padma Shri by the Government of India.

In the 1980s, the Bangs founded the nonprofit organization Society for Education, Action and Research in Community Health (SEARCH), where they trained community health workers to deliver reproductive and neonatal care services to tribal women. These trainings contributed to lower infant mortality rates in the region. Subsequently, they expanded their work to providing sex education to adolescents, supporting the rehabilitation of addicts, encouraging blood donations, and delivering healthcare services in rural India.

== Early life ==
=== Abhay Bang ===
Abhay Bang was born in 1950 in Wardha, Maharashtra, India, to economists Thakurdas and Suman Bang. His father was imprisoned for two years for participating in the Quit India Movement, a nationwide protest against the British rule. He was accepted into Ohio University to pursue his doctoral studies but turned down the offer upon Mahatma Gandhi's counsel and decided to work for social and political reform movements in rural India.

Abhay spent his childhood at Gandhi's ashram in Sevagram, attending a school that adhered to Nai Talim, an education system that encourages students to partake in manual labour to gain experiential knowledge.

=== Rani Bang ===
Rani Bang (née Chari) was born in Chandrapur in 1951. Her father was a teacher and her mother was a homemaker.

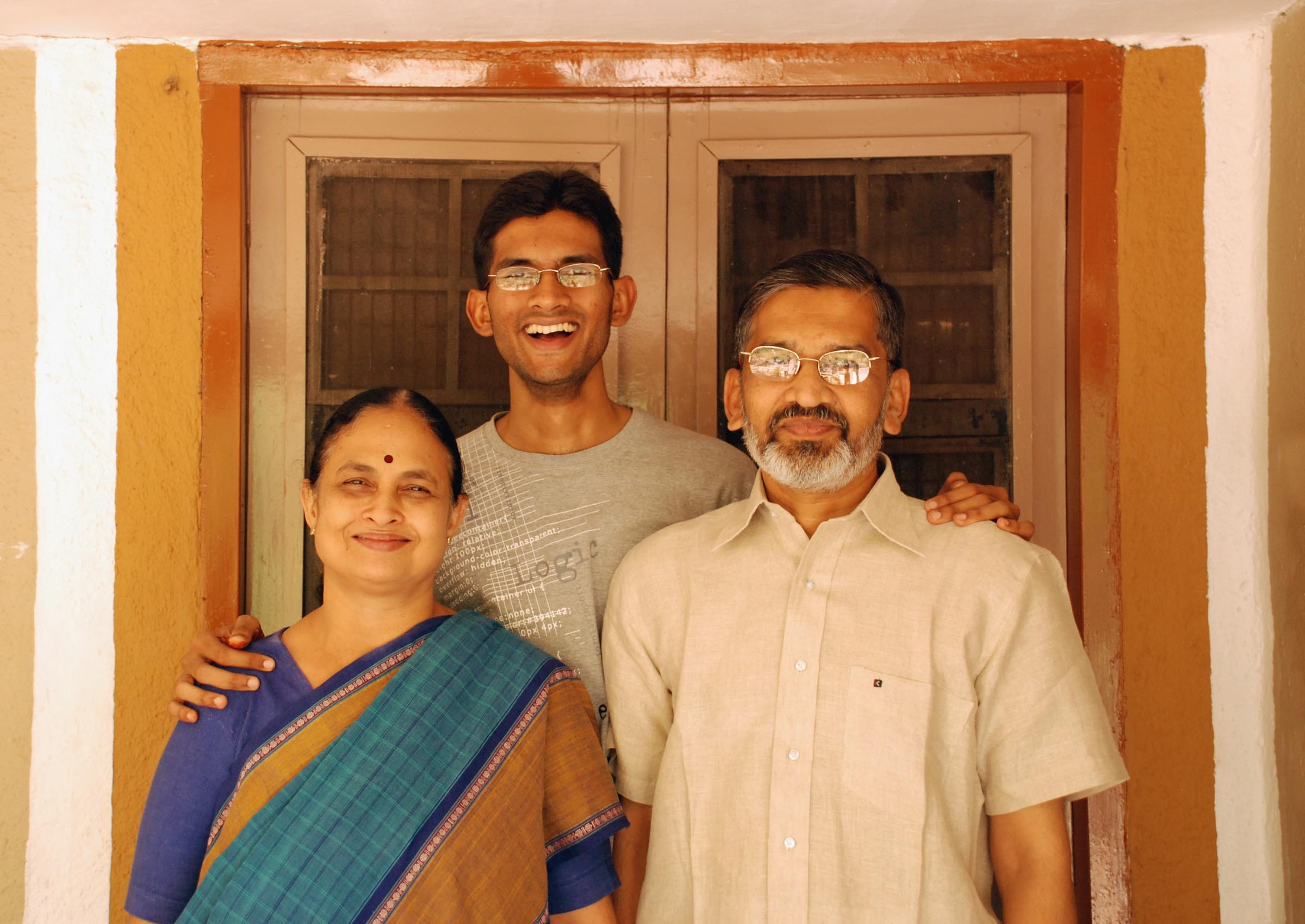
Abhay and Rani Bang with their youngest son Amrut

== Education ==
Abhay and Rani met while studying for their Bachelor of Medicine, Bachelor of Surgery (M.B.B.S.) degrees at the Nagpur University, Maharashtra. After graduating in 1972, they received their Doctor of Medicine (M.D.) degree in 1977 and 1976 respectively. The couple got married in 1977.

The Bangs also each hold a Master in Public Health, completed in 1984, from Johns Hopkins University in Baltimore, United States.

== Work ==
From 1977 to 1983, Abhay and Rani Bang worked at Chetana Vikas, a Wardha-based rural development nonprofit, founded by Ashok (Abhay's brother) and Suman Bang. They encouraged landless agricultural labourers to organize and demand a fair minimum wage from the Employment Guarantee Scheme, but failed to negotiate a "substantial increase" in the wages. Upon further investigation, Abhay found that a committee appointed by the Maharashtra government had fixed the daily minimum wage of ₹4 based on the assumption that an average adult needs only 1800 calories in a day. Contrarily, the Indian Council of Medical Research recommends between 3,900 and 3,000 for hard labourers. In 1981, Abhay published a critique of the recommendations proposed by a committee, sharing his own calculations of the minimum wage, based on the revised calorie requirements, amounted to ₹12. A year later, the state government raised the minimum wage to ₹12.

In 1985, the Bangs moved to Gadchiroli district of Maharashtra. In a former warehouse, they started treating patients and set up the nonprofit Society for Education, Action and Research in Community Health (SEARCH). Through SEARCH, they gradually built trust with the local tribals to understand and address their healthcare needs.

=== Infant and child mortality ===
The Bangs started holding regular People's Health Assemblies, allowing local inhabitants to voice their concerns, during which infant mortality emerged as one of the most pressing challenges. Their studies identified pneumonia, hypothermia, sepsis, perinatal asphyxia, and delayed breast feeding as the leading causes of death in infants. In response, they decided to implement a home-based neonatal care package to be delivered by a group of rural women trained in the basics of neonatal care. The women were taught how to diagnose pneumonia, resuscitate children, and administer antibiotics, including Vitamin K injections. Instead of locals travelling long distances to access the nearest hospital, the women (called arogyadoots or "health messengers") will carry a small health package and visit families in need of medical attention.

In 1988, the Bangs first presented their findings from this community-health initiative in The Lancet and faced scepticism regarding arogyadoots with "low level of education" administering neonatal care. However, since the inception of their childhood pneumonia management initiative in 1988 and the home-based neonatal programme in 1995, the infant mortality rate in Gadchiroli dropped from 121 per 100,000 live births in 1988 to 80 per 100,000 live births in 1990 and 30 per 100,000 live births by 2003.

The Bangs' neonatal care methods have been adopted by the World Health Organization (WHO), UNICEF, and the Indian Government, and implemented across low- and middle income countries (LMICs), including Pakistan, Afghanistan, Nepal, and Tanzania. In 2017, while hearing a series of public interest litigations (PILs) regarding the increase in "malnutrition-related deaths and illness" in the Melghat region of Vidarbha and surrounding tribal areas, the Bombay High Court accepted the Bangs' suggestions and recommendations on preventing malnutrition-driven infant and child mortality. The court directed the committee responsible for addressing malnutrition to incorporate the policy making solutions presented in their report, one of which focused on home-based neonatal and child care.

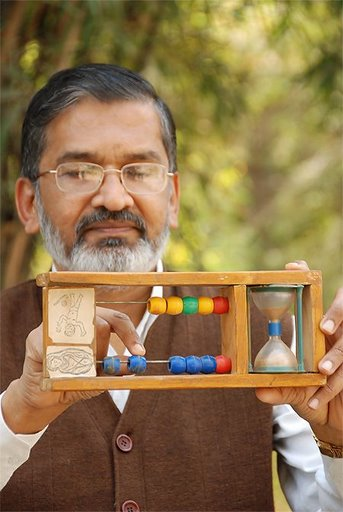
Abhay Bang with the Breath Counter he designed

=== Liquor ban in Gadchiroli district ===
The Gadchiroli district is the first district in Maharashtra where liquor has been banned due to public demand. The Bangs initiated a liquor ban campaign in 1990 by informing residents about the negative health effects of alcohol consumption. The movement resulted in the liquor ban in the district in 1992, being the first example in India of a liquor ban due to public demand.

In May 2012, Abhay Bang was a member of a panel to study a possible liquor ban in Chandrapur district. He advocates the need for an alcohol-free and tobacco-free society since, per the 2015 Global Burden of Diseases, alcohol and tobacco are two of the top ten causes of death and disease in India. Abhay Bang is developing a multi-pronged approach named Muktipath in the district of Gadchiroli to reduce the prevalence of alcohol and tobacco consumption there. He also welcomed the Supreme Court of India's ban on the location of liquor shops on state and national highways.

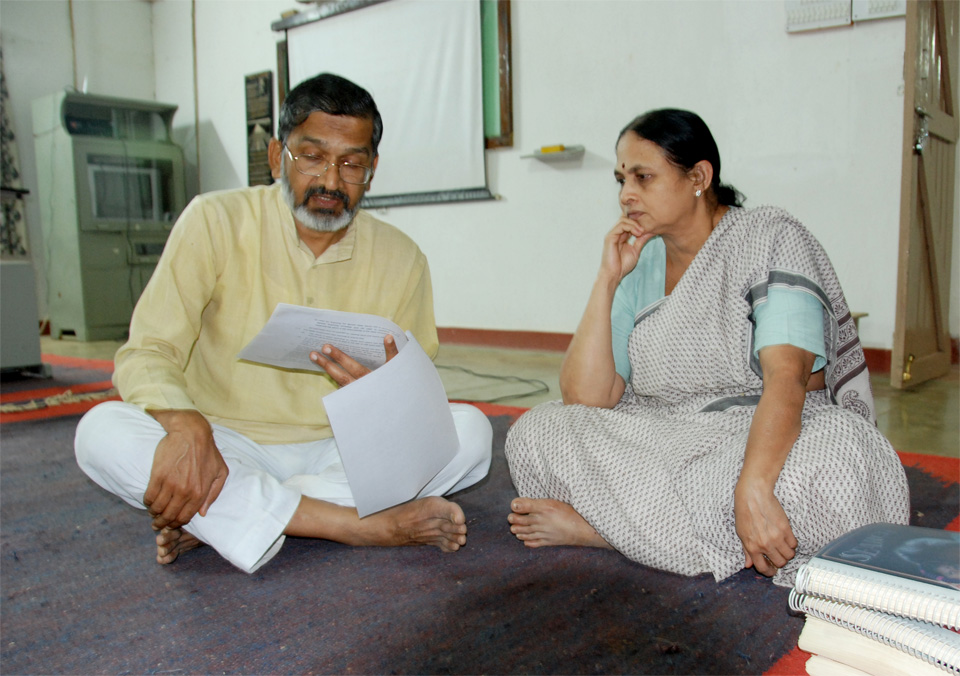
Abhay and Rani Bang

=== Reproductive health and maternal care ===
In 1988, Rani Bang conducted a study in two Gadchiroli villages, Wasa and Amirza, to highlight the "large hidden burden of gynaecological diseases" in rural women. She found that despite 92% of them experiencing menstrual issues, infections, and infertility, only one in ten women had ever sought medical attention. In addition, her study uncovered that a prevailing misconception amongst the local pregnant women was that "a well-nourished foetus is lazy and harder to deliver." As a result, they were less likely to take supplements to support foetus growth, but more open to the idea of supporting their own health. Subsequently, she advocated for a comprehensive reproductive healthcare programme for rural women, training aryadoots and dais (traditional doulas) to become village-level community health workers.

Rani also discovered that "regressive interpretations of traditions" were commonplace in the tribal communities of Gadchiroli, leading to the mainstreaming of "antiquated concepts" such as kurma ghar characterized by small huts used to isolate women for the duration of their menstrual cycle. The huts accommodated three to four women at once and were sometimes in worse conditions than cattle sheds. Within the hut, the stock of period cloths often attracted lizards and mice. Until the end of their menstrual cycle, the women were considered untouchable, expected to cook for themselves, and often repurposed Mahua (Madhuca longifolia) leaves when they ran out of period cloths or pads. While some women embraced kurma without retaliation because it was their only chance to rest and spend time with friends, others feared "divine retribution" for defying the tradition. Given how "well-entrenched" the practice of kurma was, the Bangs, instead of attempting to trying to uproot it, decided to "revamp" it instead. They received support from Mukul Madhav Foundation to build upscale versions of kurma ghars equipped with modern facilities.

Rani's book, Putting Women First: Women and Health in a Rural Community (2010) documents her experience of addressing reproductive health and childcare issues in rural India.

=== Tribal health ===
Abhay and Rani Bang have worked with the tribal communities in the forest area of the Gadchiroli district in Maharashtra since 1986. They identified malaria as the biggest health concern for this population. They sought to increase awareness by using insecticide-treated mosquito nets as a preventative measure alongside regular medical treatment among the local Adivasi.

They also run a mobile medical unit in the 48 tribal villages in the Dhanora block of Gadchiroli district and a network of village volunteers trained in providing primary care in these villages. In July 2017, the Government of Maharashtra formed a task force to control the spread of malaria in the district of Gadchiroli. Abhay Bang was appointed as the head of this task force which comprises the non-profit SEARCH, Tata Trusts, National Institute of Research and Tribal Health (NIRTH) and the Government of Maharashtra.

Abhay Bang is currently chairing a 13-member expert committee set up by the Union Health Ministry and the Ministry of Tribal Affairs, tasked with creating a nationwide status report on tribal health issues, along with suggesting possible policy formulations. While the "old" problems of malaria, malnutrition, and mortality persist, Abhay Bang emphasizes "new" health issues among the Adivasi, partly caused by outside socio-cultural influences and market forces. Tribal women now list alcohol addiction and tobacco addiction among men as their biggest concern, with over 60 percent of adults in Gadchiroli consuming the latter daily. Combined with an increase in sodium consumption, hypertension rates have been increasing in these communities, according to Bang.

=== NIRMAN ===
Started in 2006, NIRMAN brings together a group of youth aged between 18 and 28 years who are looking to give meaning to their lives. Abhay and Rani Bang's younger son, Amrut currently manages it.

NIRMAN looks at identifying and nurturing young social change-makers in Maharashtra. It is an educational process to train the youth to take up crucial issues and problems in the society. It provides guidance, expertise, and an environment to inculcate self-learning and encourages youth for social action. NIRMAN includes a series of 3 camps, each separated by 6 months. A group of NIRMAN participants will go through 3 camps in a period of one year. A camp generally runs for 7–10 days at SEARCH, Gadchiroli with a view encourage young Indian students to step out of their generally secure urban surroundings into the world of rural and tribal Indians to help them come face to face with the nation's plethora of social issues, and with people working hard to solve them.

NIRMAN is a learning process based on Nai Talim way of education introduced by Mahatma Gandhi. It believes in problem-based learning instead of classroom-based learning. This initiative is providing a common platform for youth to engage, self-educate and decide on how they can make a difference to the society.

Abhay thinks that it is important to make the present generation of doctors think about social challenges. "All doctors can earn enough to make a decent living and they must think about the purpose of their lives. Change will happen the moment they start contemplating." He believes that medical students should regularly be given rural or tribal stints as part of their curriculum so that they are exposed to the real challenges. He thinks that it is equally important to reward doctors who shun the charm of corporate world to serve the real people in need.

=== Non-communicable diseases ===
Abhay and Rani Bang and their team at SEARCH work on non-communicable diseases, as those are emerging as a priority area. A study conducted by SEARCH in 86 villages of Gadchiroli district has shown that rural people are affected by lifestyle diseases like stroke which emerged as the most frequent cause of death. One-in-seven (14%) deaths in these villages occurs due to stroke, showing that places like Gadchiroli are now passing through an 'epidemiological transition'. 87.3% stroke deaths occurred at home, indicating that rural people do not approach hospitals for treatment. Taking the study ahead, the SEARCH team now plans to test village-based solutions to minimize deaths caused due to stroke in Gadchiroli villages in collaboration with the UK's Wellcome Trust and the Department of Biotechnology of the Government of India. Yogeshwar Kalkonde – Neurologist and Senior Research Officer at SEARCH – is the main author of the study. The team also included three young MBBS doctors from NIRMAN. The study was published in July 2015 in Stroke, an international journal published by the American Stroke and Heart Association, and was presented at the 5th International Conference on Neurology and Epidemiology, held between 18 and 20 November 2015 in Australia.

In a study published in Economic and Political Weekly, Bang and SEARCH team members showed that the rural and tribal district of Gadchiroli was spending approximately ₹73.4 crore annually on consuming tobacco and related products. More than 50% of the population was consuming tobacco. SEARCH has been conducting programs to spread awareness regarding the ill effects of tobacco use and providing de-addiction services. The Maharashtra state government has formed a 12-member task force under chief minister Devendra Fadnavis for creating awareness about ill effects of using tobacco products and Abhay Bang is an advisor in the force. It will concentrate on Gadchiroli district for the first three years (2015–2018). A committee has also been constituted under the Gadchiroli District Collector for implementing the plans devised by the task force. A representative of Bang's organization SEARCH will be a member of the committee. According to Bang, spread of information and awareness for prevention, initiation of village committees and urban ward committees, implementation of laws and regulations, treatment for de-addiction, counselling via NGOs and stimulation of an alcohol and tobacco free environment in government offices, schools, colleges, markets etc., will be the methods used by the task force.

=== Surgical care ===
Abhay Bang and Rani Bang, through their organization SEARCH, built the Maa Danteshwari Hospital for the rural and tribal people of Gadchiroli. Along with OPD and IPD care, a variety of surgeries are also conducted in this setup. Doctors from throughout the state of Maharashtra come and operate in this setup. Shekhar Bhojraj, a spine surgeon from Mumbai, and his team of 6-8 other spine surgeons have been associated with SEARCH for more than 10 years and have conducted more than 100 spine surgeries in Gadchiroli. In August 2016, when Rani Bang was to undergo spinal surgery herself, she too was operated in the SEARCH hospital by Shekhar Bhojraj and his wife Shilpa, an anaesthetist in Mumbai.

== Positions held ==
Apart from being the founder-directors of SEARCH, Abhay and Rani Bang have served on various national and state level committees. Some of them are as follows:

- Chairman, Expert Group to Plan Health Care for Tribal Populations in India, Ministry of Health and Family Welfare, Government of India
- Expert member, Central Health Council, Apex Body of Ministry of Health and Family Welfare, Government of India
- Member, National Rural Health Mission Steering Group, Government of India
- Member, High Level Expert Group on Universal Health Care, Planning Commission, Government of India
- Member, National Commission on Macro-economics and Health, Government of India
- Member, Kelkar Committee on 'Regional Imbalance and Balanced Regional Development', Government of Maharashtra
- Member, Audit Advisory Board, Comptroller and Auditor General, Government of India
- Chairman, Child Mortality Evaluation Committee, Govt. of Maharashtra
- Member, National ASHA Mentoring Group, Ministry of Health and Family Welfare, Govt. of India
- Member, High Level Committee on Status of Tribal Communities, Govt. of India
- Member, National Commission on Population, Govt. of India
- Member, Steering Committee, Tropical Disease Research, World Health Organization, Geneva
- Member, Advisory Board, Saving New-born Lives Initiative, Save the Children, US
- Member, Committee on 'Improving Birth Outcome in Developing Countries' constituted by the Global Board on Health, National Academy of Sciences, US
- Member, Scientist Advisory Board, Indian Council of Medical Research, New Delhi
- Member, National Expert Group on Health for planning the 10th National Five Year Plan, Govt. of India
- Member, Governing Board, National Population Stabilization Fund, India
- Member, Planning Commission's Task Force on Panchayat Raj in Health
- Member, WHO Review Committee on Anti-fertility Vaccines
- Member, WHO Review Committee on Measuring Reproductive Morbidity
- Member, Governing Body of IIHMR (Indian Institute of Health Management and Research)
- Member, Institute of Medicine U.S. Committee on Improving Pregnancy Outcome in Underdeveloped Countries (2000–2001)

== Selected publications ==
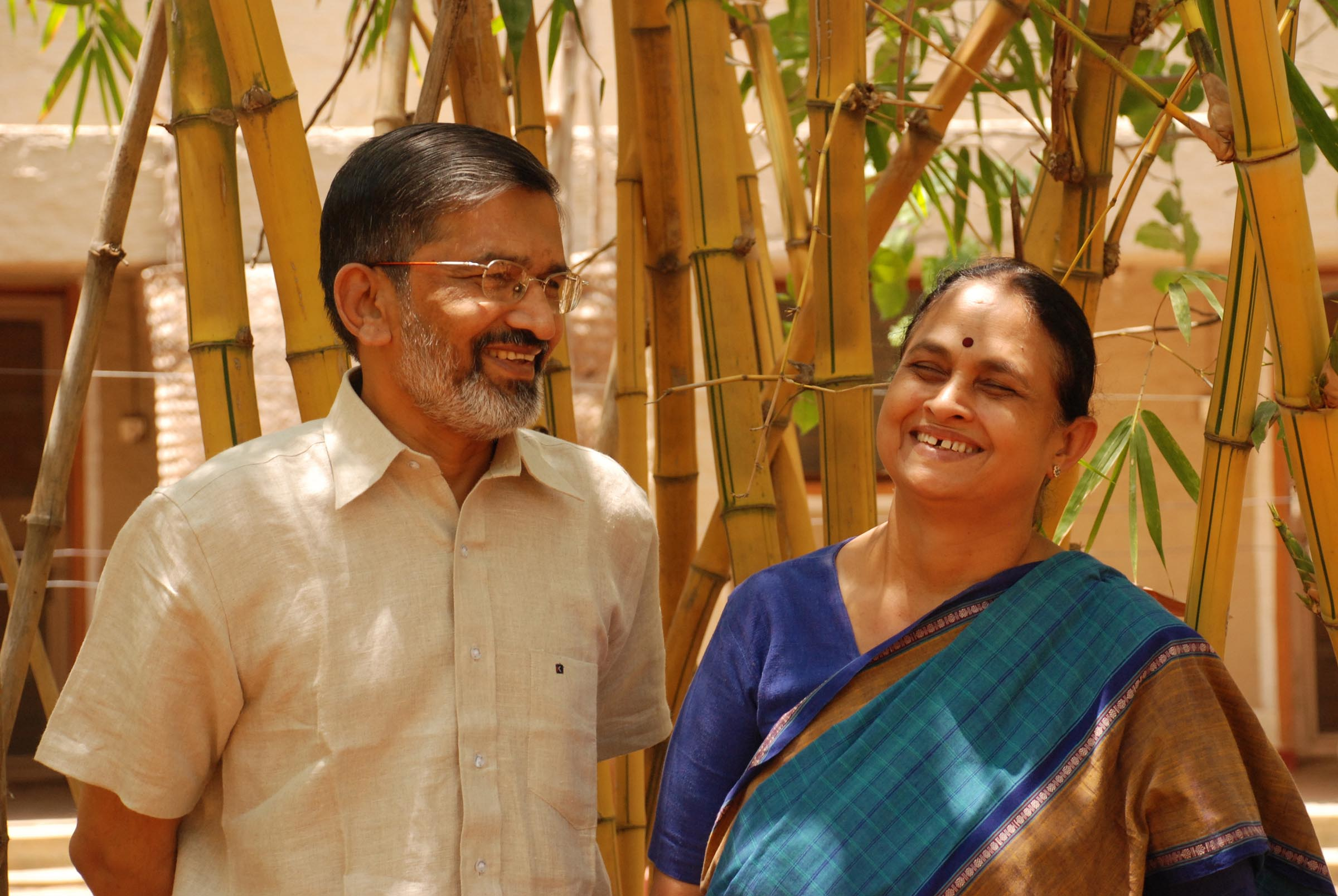
Abhay and Rani Bang

=== Books ===
==== In Marathi ====
In *माझा साक्षात्कारी हृदयरोग Majha Sakshatkari Hridayarog, Abhay Bang has written about his own experiences during his heart disease and the learning he has gained from it. The book won the Kelkar Award for the Best Literary Book in Marathi, 2000.

Rani Bang's गोईण (Goin) describes the relationship of tribal women with various trees in the Gadchiroli district. It won the Literary Award of the Government of Maharashtra. Goin means Friend in the indigenous Gondi language. Her book कानोसा (Kanosa) delves into the perceptions of rural women regarding various issues of reproductive health.

==== In English ====
- Putting Women First: Women and Health in a Rural Community – Rani Bang published in 2010.

==== In Tamil ====
- என் மாயாஜாலப் பள்ளி (தன்னறம் வெளியீடு) – Tamil translation of My Magic School.

=== Essays and letters ===
- Meeting the Mahatma by Abhay Bang, published in English Kumar Bharti Textbook of Class 9 of Maharashtra State Board of Secondary and Higher Secondary Education.
- My Magical School by Abhay Bang, which was translated in English by Arvind Gupta.
- Sevagram to Shodhgram by Abhay Bang, which was also translated in English by Arvind Gupta.
- A Postcard from Dr Abhay Bang: Vidarbha, Marathwada deserve your maximum attention, CM Fadnavis, an open letter to the Chief Minister of Maharashtra, Devendra Fadnavis, urging him to act on balanced development of the Vidarbha and Marathwada regions of Maharashtra and to take steps to reduce liquor consumption in the state.

== Awards and honors ==
The Bangs won the Maharashtra Bhushan Award, and have been awarded honorary doctorates from the Sanjay Gandhi Postgraduate Institute of Medical Sciences in Lucknow.

SNDT Women's University in Mumbai has also awarded a doctorate honoris causa to Rani Bang. Medical journal The Lancet described the couple as "the pioneers of healthcare in rural India." In 2016, Abhay and Rani Bang were recipients of the Distinguished Alumni Award from the Department of International Health at the Johns Hopkins Bloomberg School of Public Health. They were also inducted into the Johns Hopkins Society of Scholars for their leadership in community-based health care focusing on newborns and children. The Bangs have contributed to the development of community-based primary healthcare in India.

Rani Bang was one of the principal speakers in the Tietze symposium in Rio de Janeiro, Brazil in 1990. She served as a consultant to the International Clinical Epidemiology Network (INCLEN) for Reproductive health, International Women's Health Advocates on Microbiologist (IWHAM)'s 10th Five Year Plan Maharashtra Health and Nutrition Committee Member. She was nominated for the Nobel Peace Prize in 2003 as a member of 1,000 women worldwide for the prize.

Rani Bang has worked on women's reproductive health issues, sexually transmitted diseases, AIDS control, alcoholism, tribal health, and adolescent sexual health. She conducts sex education sessions called Tarunyabhaan for adolescents and teenagers across Maharashtra.

In 2008, Pratibha Patil, President of India, presented Rani Bang with the National Award for Women's Development through Application of Science & Technology for her "outstanding and pioneering contribution" to the improvement of women's health in rural areas through "innovative" and people-centered research.

=== 1980s ===
- Ashoka Fellowship, 1985

=== 1990s ===
- Mahatma Gandhi Award for Humanitarian Service, 1994
- Seshadri Gold Medal, Indian Council of Medical Research for outstanding research in community medicine, 1996

=== 2000s ===
- The Kelkar Award for the best literary book in Marathi, 2000
- Vivekanand Manava Sewa Award, 2002
- Satpal Mittal Award for Population, Indian Association of Parliamentarians, New Delhi, 2002
- Ramshastri Prabhune Puraskar for Social Justice, Satara, 2002
- Maharashtra Bhushan Award, the highest state honor of the Government of Maharashtra, 2003
- The Global Health Heroes, Time magazine, 2005
- Stree Shakti Puraskar, Ministry of Women & Child Development, Government of India, 2005
- Navratna Puraskar, Doordarshan Sahyadri Channel, Mumbai, 2005
- MacArthur Foundation International Award, 2006
- Jamnalal Bajaj Award, 2006
- National Award for Women's Development through application of Science & Technology, Government of India, 2007
- Bapu Award, Gandhi National Memorial Society, Pune, 2009

=== 2010s ===
- Society of Scholars, Johns Hopkins University, US, 2013
- First Distinguished Alumni Award, Department of International Health at the Johns Hopkins University Bloomberg School of Public Health, 2013
- Social Impact Award, Times of India, 2015
- Dr. Wankar Memorial Lifetime Achievement Award, Indian Medical Association, 2015
- Public Health Champions Award for Outstanding Contribution to Public Health in India, WHO India, 2016
- Padma Shri, the fourth highest civilian award in the Republic of India, 2018
- Iconic Changemaker Award, The Hindu, 2018
- Mahatma Gandhi Manava Seva Puraskar, M. G. College, Armori, 2019
- Degree of Literature (D.Litt.) Honoris Causa from Maharashtra University of Health Sciences, Nashik at Mumbai by Hon. Chief Minister Maharashtra, 2019
- Shahu, Phule, Ambedkar, Award, 2019

=== 2020 ===
- J.R.D. Tata Award for Excellence in Public Service, 2020
- JRD Tata Award by Ratan Tata from Population Foundation of India, New Delhi, 2020
- Achievement Award in Science Field from Vanita Samaj, Mumbai, 2020
- D.Sc. Degree from Pravara Institute of Medical Sciences, Loni, Dist. Ahmednagar, 2020

== See also ==
- Healthcare in India
- Public health in India
