= Prakash Amte =

Indian medical doctor and social worker

Prakash Baba Amte
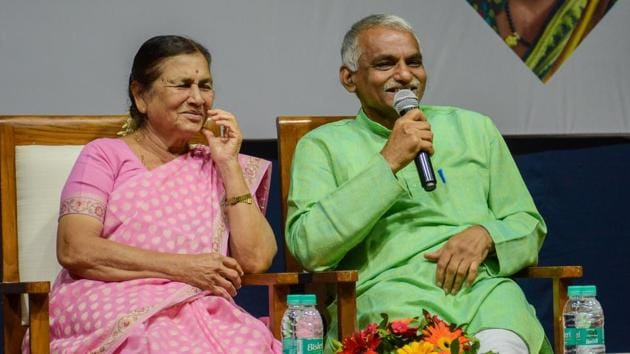
- Mandakini Amte and Prakash Amte during the interactive session at MIT college.
- Born: 26 December 1948 (age 77); Anandwan, Central Provinces and Berar, India
- Education: Government Medical College (Nagpur)
- Occupation: Social worker
- Years active: 1973 - present
- Known for: Lok Biradari Prakalp
- Spouse: Mandakini Amte
- Children: 3
- Parent: Baba Amte (Father)
- Awards: Padma Shri (2002); Ramon Magsaysay Award (2008)
- Website: www.lokbiradariprakalp.org www.lbphemalkasa.org.in

Prakash Baba Amte is a social worker from Maharashtra, India. Amte and his wife, Mandakini Amte, were awarded the Magsaysay Award for 'Community Leadership' in 2008 for their philanthropic work in the form of the Lok Biradari Prakalp amongst the Madia Gonds in the Gadchiroli district of Maharashtra and the neighbouring states of Telangana and Madhya Pradesh. In November 2019 he was awarded with the ICMR Lifetime Achievement Award by Bill Gates.

== Early life ==
Prakash Amte is the second son of Magsaysay awardee Baba Amte. He obtained a medical degree from Government Medical College (GMC), Nagpur, and he met his wife Mandakini during their post graduation studies at Government Medical College (GMC), Nagpur. Prakash and Mandakini joined Baba Amte and helped her father and others overcome the taboo and fear of leprosy. While pursuing postgraduate studies in surgery, he decided to leave academics and joined his father’s social work in Hemalkasa, a remote tribal area in Maharashtra.

== Lok Biradari Prakalp ==
In 1973, Amte moved to Hemalkasa to start the Lok Biradari Prakalp, a project for the development of tribal people, most of whom were the Madia Gond in the forests of Gadchiroli district. He lived and worked there for almost twenty years performing emergency surgical procedures without electricity. The project transformed into a hospital, Lok Biradari Prakalp Davakhana, a residential school, Lok Biradari Prakalp Ashram Shala, and an orphanage for injured wild animals, the Amte's Animal Park. The project provides health care to about 40,000 individuals annually. The Lok Biradari Prakalp Ashram School has over 600 students, residents and day scholars. Work of Amte's for Gond tribals and their philanthropic work in the form of the Lok Biradari Prakalp amongst the Madia Gonds in Gadchiroli district of Maharashtra and the neighbouring states of Andhra Pradesh and Madhya Pradesh also won them recognition. Dr Prakash and his family also run a large animal conservation facility in Hemalkasa in Gadchiroli district of Maharashtra where rare, protected, and endangered animals are cared and have freedom to roam. The family's legacy in philanthropy and animal conservation is now carried over by their sons Digant and Aniket and their respective families who are helping their parents now.

== Bibliography ==
Amte has published two autobiographies, Prakashvata (Pathways to Light), originally written in Marathi and now translated into English, Gujarati and Kannada, Sanskrit, Hindi and Raanmitra (Jungle Friends).

== Awards ==
Amte has received many national and international awards, which include:

- 2019 - Lifetime Achievement Award from ICMR presented by Bill Gates.
- 2010 - Hamdan Award for Volunteers in Humanitarian Medical Services.
- 2014 - Mother Teresa Awards for Social Justice.
- 2012 - Lokmanya Tilak Award - Jointly with his brother Vikas Amte
- 2009 - Godfrey Philips Lifetime Achievement Award
- 2008 - Ramon Magsaysay Award for Community Leadership - jointly with his wife Mandakini Amte

Citation: "In electing Prakash Amte and Mandakini Amte to receive the 2008 Ramon Magsaysay Award for Community Leadership, the board of trustees recognizes their enhancing the capacity of the Madia Gonds to adapt positively in today's India, through healing and teaching and other compassionate interventions."

- 2002 - Padma Shri, Government of India
- 1995 - The Principality of Monaco issued a postal stamp to honour Prakash and Mandakini Amte.
- 1984 - Adivasi Sevak Award, from Government of Maharashtra, India

== In popular culture ==
The biographical film Dr Prakash Baba Amte : The Real Hero starring Nana Patekar as Prakash Amte and Sonali Kulkarni as Mandakini Amte was released on 10 October 2014. The film has been released in three languages, Hindi, Marathi and English.

== Health ==
In 2022, Dr. Prakash Amte was diagnosed with hairy cell leukemia, a rare blood cancer, and has been receiving treatment at Deenanath Mangeshkar Hospital, Pune.

== See also ==
- H. Sudarshan
- Baba Amte
- Hemalkasa
- Naam Foundation
- Nana Patekar
- Makarand Anaspure
- Adhik Kadam
