= Madia Gond =

Indigenous tribe of Maharashtra, India

The Madia Gond
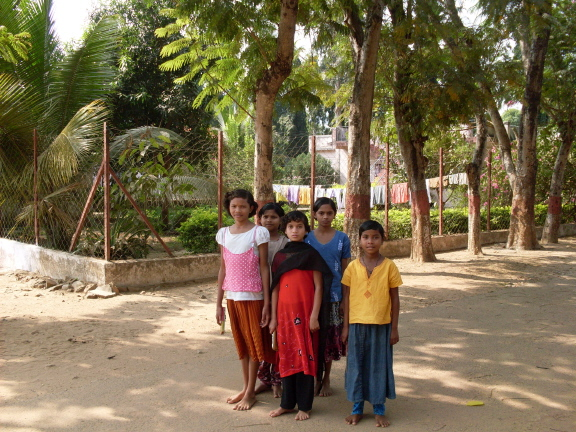
- Madia school girls on the grounds of Lok Biradari Prakalp school.

Total population
- 77,000 (1997–1998)

Regions with significant populations
- Gadchiroli District – Maharashtra, Bastar division – Chhattisgarh

Languages
- Madiya

Religion
- Koyapunem with significant influence from Hinduism

Related ethnic groups
- Gond people

Madia Gonds or Madia or Maria (Gondi: [maːɽijaː]) are one of the endogamous Gond tribes living in Chandrapur District and Gadchiroli District of Maharashtra State, and Bastar division of Chhattisgarh State India. They have been granted the status of a particularly vulnerable tribal group by the Government of India under its affirmative action or reservation programme. The Madia Gonds are strongly affected by Naxal activities. The Madia Gond use the self designation Madia, and call the area where they live Madia Desh. They speak the Madia dialect of Gondi. The shifting agriculture of madia is known as jhoom.
A study mentions living megalithic practices amongst the Madia Gonds. One of the findings of The Bench Mark Survey done in 1997–1998: 91.08 per cent of Madia Gond families lived Below Poverty Line.

== Tradition and culture ==
Madias today are doctors, teachers, government employees and naxalites. Performance of school going Madia children is on par with other children of Maharashtra state, a Madia girl student has figured in the merit list of candidates at the state level. The following are the descriptions of the Madia Gond as recorded by the British Rulers in the District Gazettes, which has been carried in the Gazettes of independent India.

=== Description in the Chanda district gazette ===
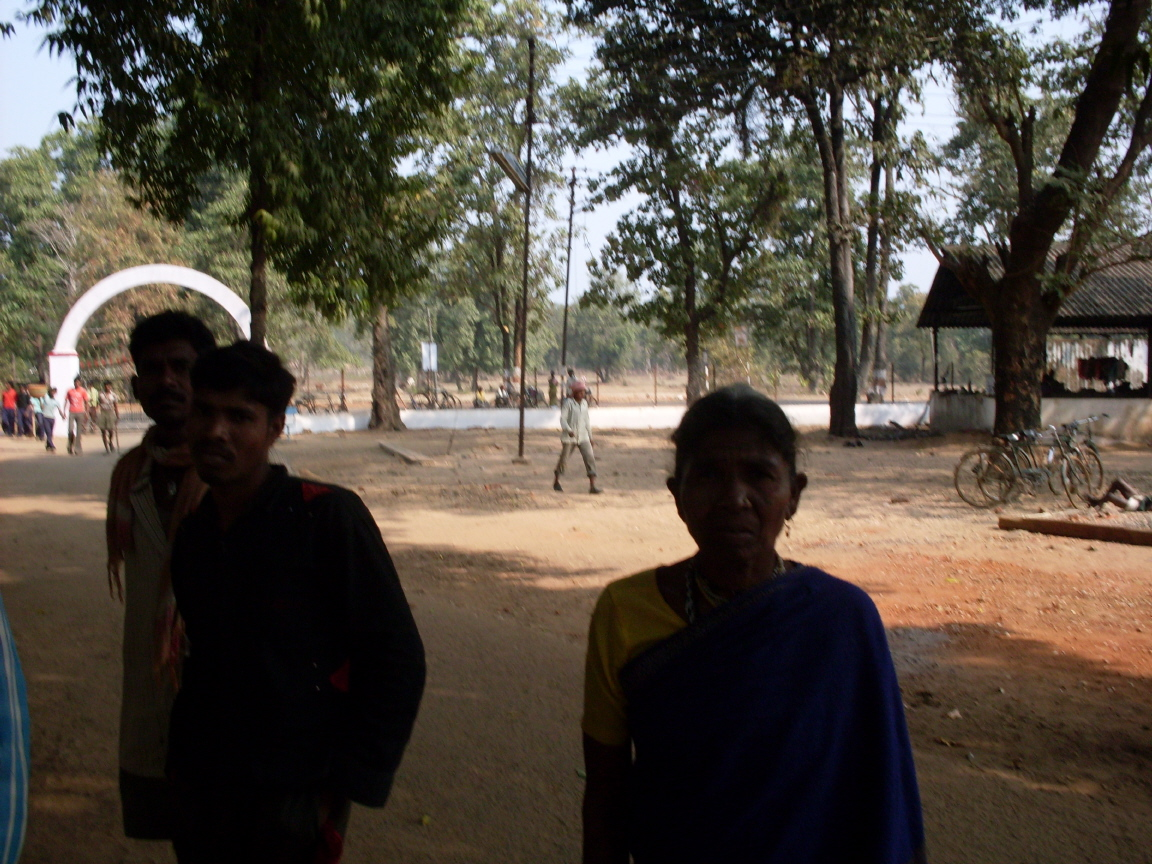
A Madia Gond family on the grounds of Lok Biradari Prakalp

The Chandrapur district gazette description of the Madia is as follows:

The Marias inhabit the wilder tracts, and are in their unsophisticated state a very attractive people. The villages are usually built deep in the jungle near some wide shallow stream, which offers facilities for the gata cultivation, (Note: [Gata means a field or plot.] system in which kharif crop is invariably light rice, generally sown broadcast; this is reaped in October, and the fields are again ploughed and cropped with gram, linseed and rabi pulses; occasionally wheat is the second crop. This system is quite distinct from the 'ordinary double-cropping, when pulses are sown as a catch-crop after rice; here, the light rice is a "catch" crop, and 'the second harvest is the more important; but the profits from the cultivation are high, because the out-turn of the rice is heavy, and the expenses of transplantation are saved.) and the surrounding jungles supplement the fruits of their agricultural efforts. Few villages lack the customary grove of toddy – Palm wine trees, the juice of which, fermented or unfermented, is ever acceptable to the Gond. The Marias are a lithe, active looking, well-built set of men, open, hearty manner, and the cheerful smile of good fellowship. Their dress is scanty, consisting of a compromise between a langoti (a loincloth) and a dhoti, a strip of cloth wound tightly round the waist in rope-like folds and passed between the legs with the spare end hanging down in front below the knees. Often this garment diminishes to the scantiest rag. They adorn their necks with handsome strings of beads and their arms occasionally with metal and glass bangles. Their ears are pulled out of shape by the weight of numerous brass rings with which they are usually garnished and occasionally they wear pagris. A curved knife with a brass mounted handle is stuck into the waist cloth and, from the shoulder dangles the ever handy axe without which a Gond seldom moves. Maria women wear a lugada of strong cloth usually white with a coloured strip in the border. They wear no choli (blouse), no Gond woman ever does, and their necks, like their husbands are garnished with beads. They frequently tattoo their faces and limbs in intricate patterns."

Dance

All Gonds and especially Madias, are very fond of dancing. It is the great amusement of the people. Night after night in the eastern tracts in the cool, moon-lit nights of the hot weather, the rhythmic lilt of a Gondi chorus fills the air, as the villagers dance round a fire in some open space near the hamlet. The favourite dance is a peculiar rippling step forward with the foot dragged, not very graceful when done by a single individual, but looking quite different when done in unison by a great circle of dancers singing a 're-la', 're-la', chorus to which the step keeps time. In some villages, where the headman is an enthusiast for the pastime, a trained band performs weird and wonderful step dances to the sound of the drum. At a big dance, the trained band occupies the inner ring round the fire, while the common folk, men and maids, in separate rings move round in great circles in opposite ways. All are dressed for the occasion in their best, bearing in their hands weird ornaments of wicker work, with garlands of flowers on their necks and in their hair, feather ornaments humorously or coquettishly placed. Seen in the glow of a huge log fire, glinting on the shining beads and barbaric ornaments of the dancers, with the throb of the drums and the beat of many feet moving in unison to the wild music of the voices in chorus, a Madia dance is a spectacle not easily forgotten, but lingers as a characteristic scene when other details have faded out of the memory. Men and women ordinarily dance in separate circles but in the dances where the young men choose their brides, they dance in couples.

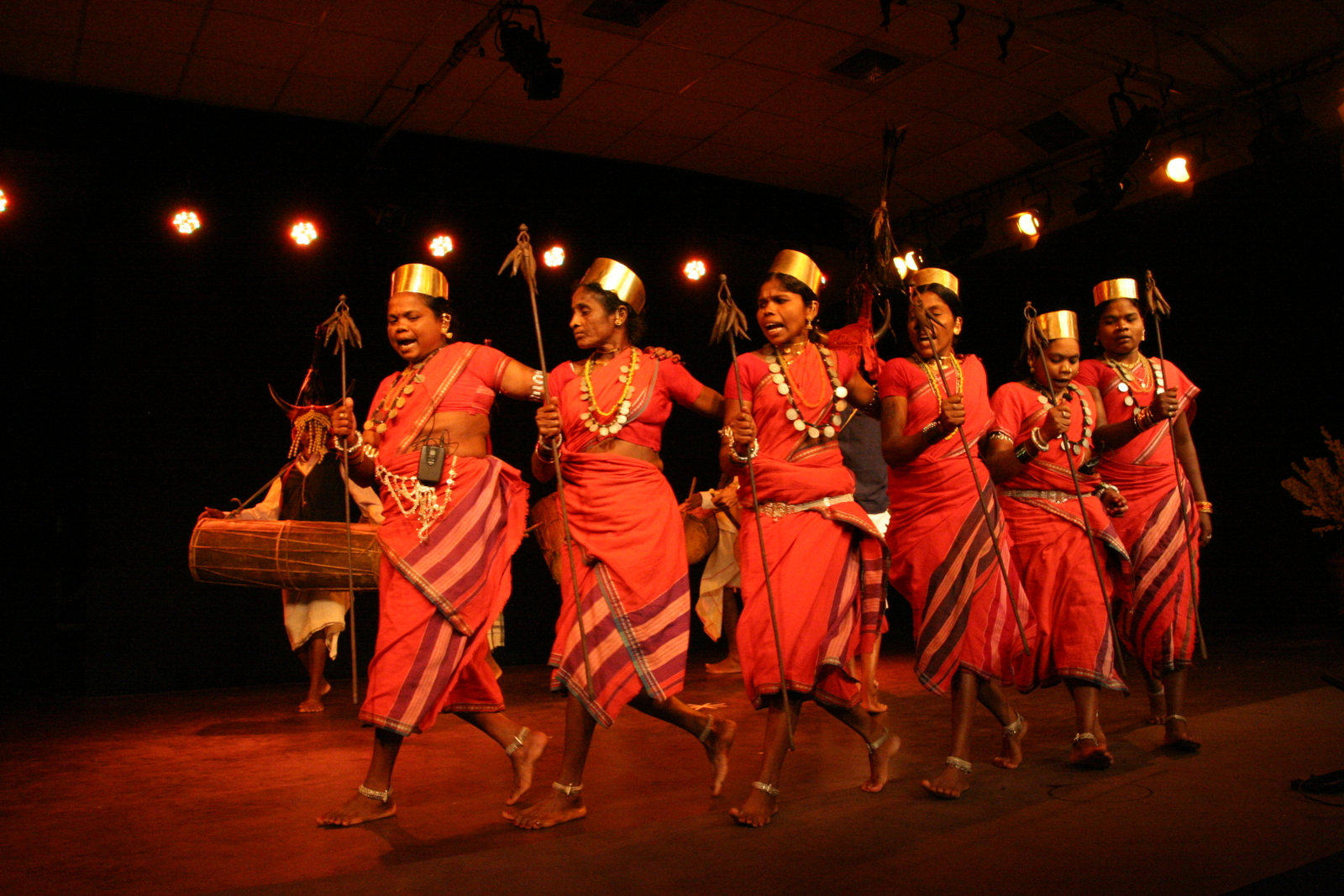
Bison Horn Maria Tribal Dance Bastar

=== Ghotul ===
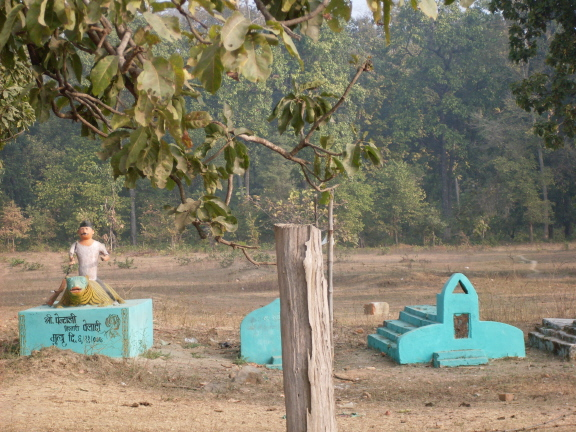
A Madia Gond memorial to a dead person

The youth dormitory system or Ghotul is deeply rooted in Madia Gond culture. Traditionally the Madia have a Ghotul in every village where unmarried boys and girls assemble in the evening and play, mix, dance and sing until late night but return to their houses for sleeping, which marks the difference between Bastar Ghotuls and the Ghotuls of Madia Gonds. There is a taboo against married women entering a Ghotul.

=== Government's liquor policy ===
The Government has granted concession to Adivasis to manufacture and possess toddy for domestic consumption on obtaining toddy licences for a period of one year (i.e. July to June every year). This privilege is given to the people of this community as they are used to toddy drinking as a part of their food for ages. According to the excise arrangements now in force in that area, each individual applicant is granted Toddy licence for tapping trees ranging from 1 to 5 for domestic consumption. The permit fee and tree tax per toddy tree is 75 paise per annum respectively.

=== Mundha ===
Mundha is one-piece decorative wooden pillar carved by a bridegroom after he is engaged. It is kept in front of Ghotul during his marriage ceremony perhaps the best example of skill in wood carving. These are reminiscent of the totem poles of the Americas.

=== Myths ===
About menstruation, the Maria Gond believe that the vagina once contained teeth and that when these teeth were removed, the wound never healed completely

== Contemporary life style ==
=== Naxal Activities ===
A Frontline Cover Story calls the Bhamragad Taluka where the Madia Gond Adivasis live, the heart of the naxalite-affected region in Maharashtra. In the jungles and 120-odd naxalite-affected villages of eastern Gadchiroli, it is the Adivasis who pay the price for extremist violence. "Whether a policeman or a naxalite, it is the Adivasis who is caught in the crossfire. The bosses are never Adivasis. They are safe in their offices or hideouts," a resident of Bhamragad is mentioned saying in the article.The police are quoted as saying that The Communist Part of India (Maoist) has around 250 full-time members and 3,000-odd local supporters. Many tribals accused of being informers are killed by naxalites or harassed by the police. Despite the constant fear, Adivasis do agree that naxalites have forced contractors to give them higher wages for tendu leaves collected and bamboo cut. The possibility of justice and action against their exploiters – the forest department, the police, the government, the contractors, makes the Madia Gonds sympathise with the naxals. Harassment by the police pushes many naxalite sympathisers underground.

==== Eka Nakshalwadya Cha Janma ====
Eka Nakshalwadya Cha Janma, (Marathi: एका नक्षलवाद्याचा जन्म – The birth of a Naxal), a novel written by Vilas Balkrishna Manohar, a volunteer with the Lok Biradari Prakalp, is a fictional account of a Madia Gond Juru's unwilling journey of life his metamorphosis from an exploited nameless tribal to a Naxal, a fugitive from the law.

=== Collection of tendu leaves ===
Tendu patta, or the leaves of the Diospyros melanoxylon (an ebony tree with date-like fruit) in which tobacco is rolled to make beedis; is for the poor in this impoverished eastern Maharashtra district a crucial source of livelihood. Summer when temperatures touch 45 degrees Celsius, is peak earning time for the Madia. Tens of thousands of tribal women and children are engaged in collecting tendu leaves every summer. Women and children get up at 4.30 in the morning and walk towards the forests near their village. In no time the forests are transformed into a beehive of activity, with small armies of women and children plucking tendu leaves with assembly-line precision. The plucking session ends around 11 am and the women and children walk back balancing the weight of the leaves on their heads. Back in their villages, the women sort out the leaves and tie them up in bundles, squatting for hours inside their huts. They do the bulk of the work; it is they who bear the brunt of the hot sun and the drudgery. The day's collection of tendu patta is taken to the market or phad at around 4.30 pm and laid out in long, neat rows that stretch for acres in sun-baked fields or dry riverbeds. Men appointed by private contractors count the bundles and record them in their registers for future payments. The names in the register are those of the men. It is the husbands and fathers of the toiling women and children who claim the money. Although the tendu patta season doesn't last more than two weeks, each healthy family unit can make a significant earning in this time. Tendu patta thus helps the poor earn enough money to survive the two months before the onset of the monsoons.

=== Status of women ===
A Madia Gond girl has the freedom to have premarital sex and choose husband. As a married woman she has a freedom to take divorce if the husband gives ill treatment to her or if she cannot beget a child from him. She has a right to spend her earnings. A husband does not interfere in her affairs. However, even these women are taboo during menstruation and are not allowed attending the festivals.

=== Organisations associated ===
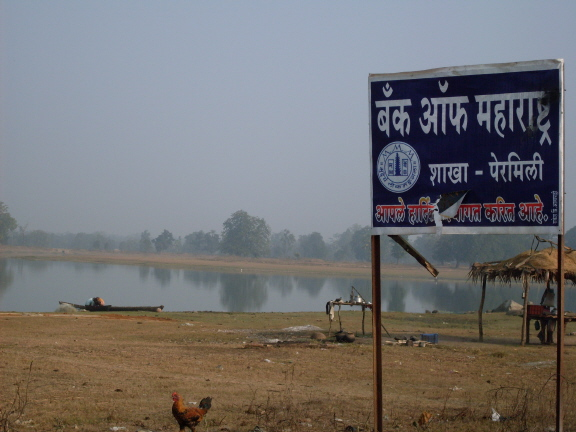
Board – Bank of Maharashtra, Perimili a Madia Gond village in Bhamragad Taluka

- Lok Biradari Prakalp is an NGO working in the fields of health and education in the Bhamragad taluka of Gadchiroli, where many Madia Gond live. It was established in 1973 Dr. Prakash Amte and Dr. Mandakini Amte working for the Lok Biradari Prakalp received the 2008 Ramon Magsaysay Award for Community Leadership. In the citation the board of trustees stated:

the board of trustees recognizes their enhancing the capacity of the Madia Gonds to adapt positively in today's India, through healing and teaching and other compassionate interventions.

- The Tribal Cultural Heritage of India Foundation: Established in Amsterdam, the Netherlands, in 2008.
- SEARCH Society For Education, Action and Research In Community Health.

=== Health issues ===
Historically the Madia Gond were victims of the ravages of small-pox and skin-diseases and a mild form of leprosy called Gondi rog. Prevalence of sickle cell anemia is very high amongst the Madia Gond.

== Research studies ==
The primitive tribe status of the Madia Gond make them the subject of various studies, such as the following:

=== Genetic diversity ===
A Microsatellite diversity was analysed in Gondi language speaking Madia Gonds of Maharashtra and three other Marathi speaking Proto – Australoid tribal groups, to understand their genetic structure and to identify the congruence between language and gene pool. Allele frequency data at 15 Short tandem repeat (STR) loci in studied tribes was compared with data of 22 Indo-European- and Dravidian-speaking caste and tribal populations using heterozygosity, allele size variance, analysis of molecular variance (AMOVA), GST (Glutathione S-transferase) estimate, PC plot, and Mantel correlation test. Results demonstrate that Gondi tribes comprising the Madia-Gond, a hunter-gatherer population, harbour lower diversity than Marathi tribal groups, which are culturally and genetically distinct. The Proto-Australoid tribal populations were genetically differentiated from castes of similar morphology, suggesting different evolutionary mechanisms operating upon the populations. The populations showed genetic and linguistic similarity, barring a few groups with varied migratory histories. The microsatellite variation clearly demonstrates the interplay of sociocultural factors including linguistic, geographical contiguity, and microevolutionary processes in shaping the genetic diversity of populations in contemporary India.

=== Emancipation of women ===
The study is a record and analysis of the following events. The coming together of Madia women to form a Self Help Group, in Bagul village of Gadchiroli District, to assert their independence, the breaking of Madia customs which triggered a group member to be brutalised and paraded naked by her husband, her committing suicide, the subsequent coming together of the other members in protest, further breaking of tribal taboos, the decision taken to wear blouses and to the breaking of isolation and pollution norms during menstruation, the initiative taken in execution of government development schemes. The Naxal fear of loss of influence in the face of development and inclusion in the mainstream of the Madia. Their opposition to the activities of the Self Help Group. The murder of an engineer by the Naxals. The ongoing struggle engaged by the Madia women against poverty, prejudice, male domination and vested interests in the form of the Naxals, the politicians and the bureaucracy.

=== Bench Mark Survey 1997–98 ===
The results of the Bench Mark Survey was organised in the tribal area of the Maharashtra State pertinent to the Madia Gond are tabulated hereunder. (Note: Bench Mark Survey At the instance of Central Government, the Bench Mark Survey was organised in the Tribal Area of the Maharashtra State with a view to collect factual information of the socio-economic conditions of the tribals. The survey was carried out in three levels: 1. Village Level; 2. Pada (hamlet) Level; 3. Household Level; Three distinct type of survey schedules were designed and canvassed. The assistance of field level staff of Tribal Development Department was taken to fill in the survey schedules. The survey was restricted to tribal households only. Accordingly the survey has encompassed 8,338 villages and their hamlets and about 650,000 tribal households in the Tribal Area of the State. The field work was completed in the year 1997–98. Data processing was completed in the year 1999–2000.)

Population

female	male	total
38749	38156	76905

Literacy

female	male	total
30.19	16.09	23.19

Occupation family wise

Agriculture	Agriculture labour	Forest labour	Other	Total	Migration %	BPL %
10444	2260	365	282	13351	34	91.08
