= Mandakini Amte =

Indian doctor and social worker

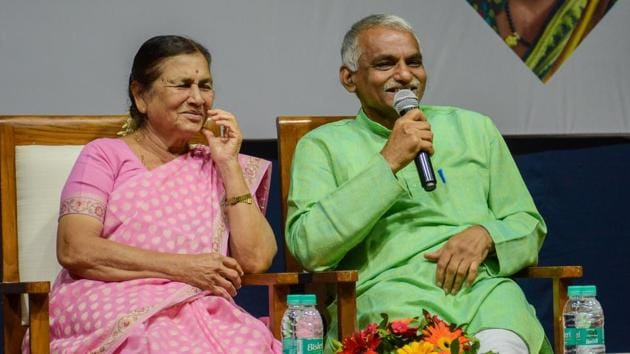
- Mandakini Amte and Prakash Amte during the interactive session at MIT college.
- Born: Mandakini Deshpande
- Education: Government Medical College (Nagpur)
- Occupation: Social worker
- Years active: 1973 - present
- Known for: Lok Biradari Prakalp
- Spouse: Prakash Amte
- Children: 3
- Awards: Ramon Magsaysay Award 2008
- Website: www.lokbiradariprakalp.org www.lbphemalkasa.org.in

Mandakini Amte, known as Manda Amte, is a medical doctor and social worker from Maharashtra, India. She along with her husband, Prakash Amte were awarded the Magsaysay Award for 'Community Leadership' in 2008 for their philanthropic work in the form of the Lok Biradari Prakalp amongst the Madia Gonds in Gadchiroli district of Maharashtra and the neighbouring states of Andhra Pradesh and Madhya Pradesh. She is the daughter-in-law of Baba Amte.

== Early life, education and career ==
Amte was born as Mandakini Deshpande. She had completed her MBBS from Nagpur and later decided to do her post-graduation in Anesthesia in Government Medical College, Nagpur. Prakash, her future husband, was a surgeon and they worked together in the same operation theatre.

Her father was opposed to her marriage with Prakash Amte as he feared that it meant she would have to live among lepers, which was a taboo then.

== Magsaysay award ==
Amte & her husband were jointly awarded the Magsaysay Award for community leadership in 2008, her citation reads as follows:

"In electing Prakash Amte and Mandakini Amte to receive the 2008 Ramon Magsaysay Award for Community Leadership, the board of trustees recognizes their enhancing the capacity of the Madia Gonds to adapt positively in today's India, through healing and teaching and other compassionate interventions.

== Commemorative stamp ==
The Principality of Monaco brought out a postage stamp in honour of the life and work of Prakash Mandakini in 1995.

A French couple, Guy and Greet Barthelemy, who had worked with Schweitzer in the early fifties, visited the project in 1992. They were moved to see the similarity of conditions at Hemalkasa and those in Africa where Schweitzer worked. This French couple went back and appealed to Prince Rainier III of Monaco to publish a postal stamp to honour the Amtes, which was done in 1995.
