= Lok Biradari Prakalp =

Social project

- Abbreviation: LBP
- Formation: 23 December 1973
- Type: NGO.
- Legal status: Registered NGO, FRCA clearance.
- Purpose: Medical services, educational development, preservation of wildlife.
- Headquarters: Hemalkasa, Tal. Bhamragad, Dist. Gadchiroli. Maharashtra.
- Official language: Marathi, Madia.
- Medical Director: Dr. Prakash Amte
- Parent organization: Maharogi Seva Samiti
- Website: lokbiradariprakalp.org lbphemalkasa.org.in

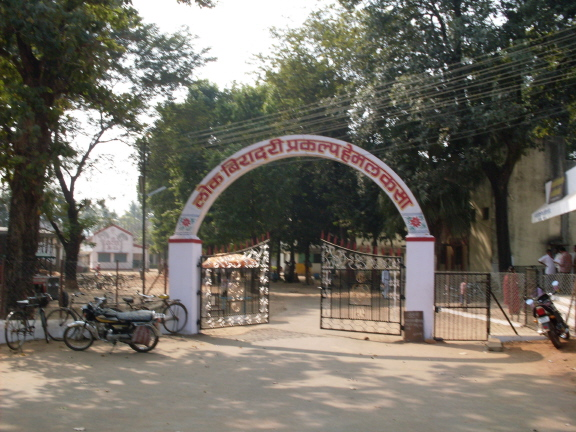
Entry to LBP

Lok Biradari Prakalp (LBP) (Marathi; Brotherhood of People project) is a social project of the Maharogi Sewa Samiti, Warora involving a hospital, a school and an animal orphanage. It was started on 23 December 1973, by the social worker Baba Amte for integrated development of Madia Gond. It is in Hemalkasa, Bhamragad taluka in Gadchiroli District of Maharashtra, India.

Dr. Prakash Amte and his wife Dr. Mandakini Amte, who serve as the medical director and medical officer at the project respectively, were awarded the 2008 Ramon Magsaysay Award for Community Leadership.

== Davakhana ==
Davakhana means clinic in Marathi. In this project, primary health care has been given top priority. Six sub-centres were started in the interior forest area, geographically wide apart from the main hospital; three are still functional.

The early years of the project entailed a massive struggle in the difficult conditions of a thick and remote forest. The centre, started in 1973, has recently developed into a full-fledged hospital of 40 beds and caters to over 45,000 patients annually. At Hemalkasa the hospital is ensconced in the surrounding dense forest, where the Madia Gond tribal patients feel most comfortable in recuperating. Hundreds of patients come daily to the hospital traversing long and difficult terrain sometimes on foot.

== Ashram Shala ==
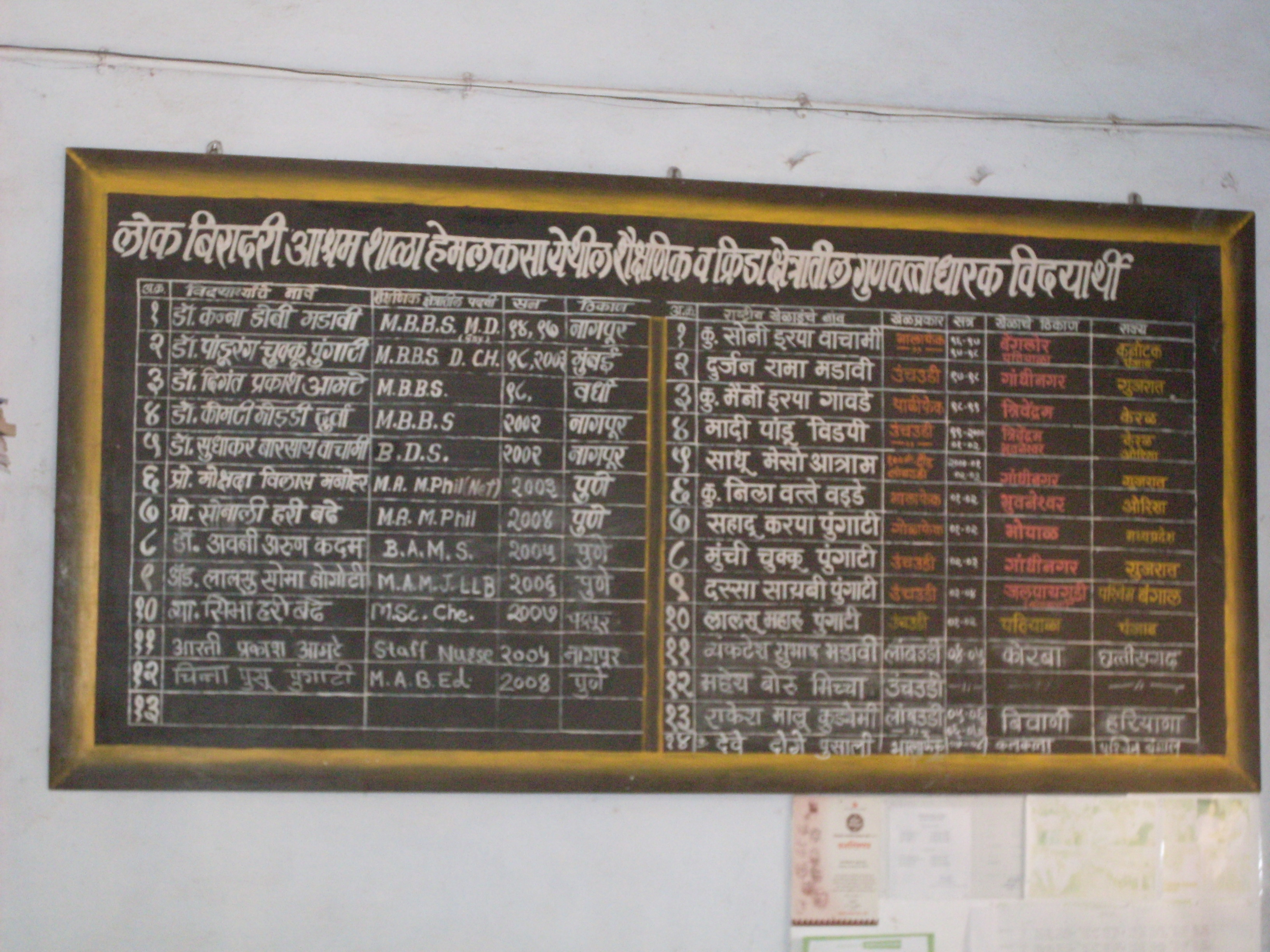
A board in the school office. It lists academic and sports achievements of its students and alumni

An ashram shala or a residential school was started in 1976 for the tribal children now having classes from 1st to 12th Standard, giving free education to over 600 students. They are provided with free lodging and boarding facilities. All education material is also provided free of cost to them. Apart from formal education, they are provided vocational training and guidance, which will be useful in their day-to-day life, e.g., practical training in farming, seed production, dairy, bamboo craft, ceramic art, greeting cards, tailoring, health education, etc. These programmes are aimed at the survival of the tribals to bring about awareness of social rights and duties through continued dialogue and social exposure.

43 students of the school appeared for the 2007-2008 Secondary School Certificate Examination, held by the Maharashtra State Board for Secondary and Higher Secondary Education. 36 students passed, a pass percentage of 83.72%. In comparison, the state passing percentage was 86.33%.

40 students of the school appeared for the 2007-2008 Higher Secondary School Certificate Examination, held by the Maharashtra State Board for Secondary and Higher Secondary Education. 37 students passed a pass percentage of 92.50%. The state passing percentage was 87.39%.

Illustrious Madia Gond alumni

- Dr. Kanna Madavi
- Dr. Pandurang Pungati
- Dr. Komti Durwa
- Dr. Sudhakar Wachami

== Amte's Animal Orphanage ==
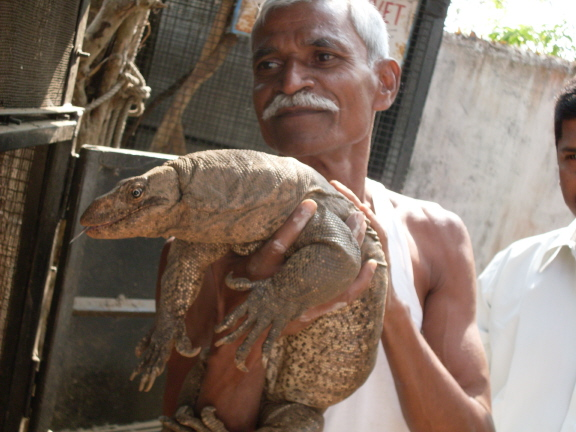
Dada Panchal, retired headmaster of the LBP's primary school nursing a Bengal Monitor at the Amte's Animal Ark

A small sheltered enclosure has been formed at Hemalkasa to keep orphaned babies of wild animals, thereby protecting them from being killed for food. The Hemalkasa community of workers live in complete harmony with a great diversity of wild animals in this relatively undisturbed, thick forest. Amte’s Animal Ark – Orphanage cum Rescue Center at Hemalkasa includes leopards, bears, snakes, deer, wild boars, crocodiles, lions, hyenas, etc.

Negal I and Negal II are books based upon real stories of leopards who grew here. Authored by Vilas Balkrishna Manohar, volunteer with the Lok Biradari Prakalp, the books describe his experience living with wild animals including big cats. He wrote two more books, Eka Nakshalwadya Cha Janma and Nari Bhakshak.
