= Rajendra Raut =

Indian politician

Rajendra Vitthal Raut

Member of Maharashtra Legislative Council
- Incumbent
- Assumed office 22 June 2026
- Preceded by: Prashant Paricharak
- Constituency: Solapur Local Authority

Member of Maharashtra Legislative Assembly
- In office 2019–2024
- Preceded by: Dilip Sopal
- Succeeded by: Dilip Sopal
- Constituency: Barshi
- In office 2004–2009
- Preceded by: Dilip Sopal
- Succeeded by: Dilip Sopal
- Constituency: Barshi

Personal details
- Born: 23 October 1965 (age 60) Barshi, Solapur District
- Party: Bharatiya Janata Party
- Other political affiliations: Shiv Sena; Indian National Congress
- Children: 2
- Occupation: Politician
- Website: Official website

Rajendra alias Rajabhau Vitthal Raut is an independent politician from Solapur district. He is Member of the Legislative Assembly from Barshi (Vidhan Sabha constituency) of Solapur District, Maharashtra, India. He was elected independent MLA in 2019.

== Positions held ==
- 2004: Elected as Member of Maharashtra Legislative Assembly (1st term)
- 2019: Elected as Member of Maharashtra Legislative Assembly (2nd term)
- 2026: Elected as Member of Maharashtra Legislative Council (1st term)

== See also ==
- Barshi Assembly Constituency
- Osmanabad Lok Sabha Constituency
