= Zare, Solapur district =

Village in Maharashtra

Zare
- village
- Location in Maharashtra, India Zare (India)
- Coordinates: 18.328823°N 75.1325267°E
- Country: India
- State: Maharashtra
- District: Solapur district

Languages
  - Official: Marathi
- Time zone: UTC+5:30 (IST)

Zare is a village in the Karmala taluka of Solapur district in Maharashtra state, India.

== Demographics ==
Covering 2,856 hectares (7,060 acres) and comprising 729 households at the time of the 2011 census of India, Zare had a population of 3140. There were 1644 males and 1496 females, with 348 people being aged six or younger.
