= Ghargaon, Solapur district =

Village in Maharashtra

Ghargaon
- village
- Location in Maharashtra, India Ghargaon (India)
- Country: India
- State: Maharashtra
- District: Solapur district

Languages
  - Official: Marathi
- Time zone: UTC+5:30 (IST)

Ghargaon is a village in the Karmala taluka of Solapur district in Maharashtra state, India.

== Demographics ==
Covering 794 hectares (1,960 acres) and comprising 304 households at the time of the 2011 census of India, Ghargaon had a population of 1312. There were 694 males and 618 females, with 187 people being aged six or younger.
