= Katraj, Solapur district =

Village in Maharashtra

Katraj
- village
- Location in Maharashtra, India Katraj (India)
- Country: India
- State: Maharashtra
- District: Solapur district

Languages
  - Official: Marathi
- Time zone: UTC+5:30 (IST)

Katraj is a village in the Karmala taluka of Solapur district in Maharashtra state, India.

== Demographics ==
Covering 838 hectares (2,070 acres) and comprising 273 households at the time of the 2011 census of India, Katraj had a population of 1354. There were 677 males and 677 females, with 162 people being aged six or younger.
