= Dahigaon, Solapur district =

Village in Maharashtra

Dahigaon
- village
- Location in Maharashtra, India Dahigaon (India)
- Country: India
- State: Maharashtra
- District: Solapur district

Languages
  - Official: Marathi
- Time zone: UTC+5:30 (IST)

Dahigaon is a village in the Karmala taluka of Solapur district in Maharashtra state, India.

== Demographics ==
Covering 993 hectares (2,450 acres) and comprising 308 households at the time of the 2011 census of India, Dahigaon had a population of 1683. There were 875 males and 808 females, with 267 people being aged six or younger.
