= Karmala (disambiguation) =

Karmala may refer to:

- Karmala, a town and taluka headquarters in Solapur district, Maharashtra, India
- Karmala Taluka, a taluka in Solapur district, Maharashtra, India
- Karmala (Rural), a village in Solapur district, Maharashtra, India
- Karmala (Vidhan Sabha constituency)
- A classical name for the Zamantı River
