= Kumbhari, Solapur =

Village in Maharashtra, India

Kumbhari
- Village
- Location within Maharashtra Location within India
- Coordinates: 17°39′00″N 75°59′18″E
- Country: India
- State: Maharashtra
- District: Solapur
- Taluk: Solapur South

Government
  - Type: Gram panchayat

Area
  - Total: 57.4 km^{2} (22.2 sq mi)
- Elevation: 480 m (1,570 ft)

Population (2011)
  - Total: 31,044
  - Density: 541/km^{2} (1,400/sq mi)

Languages
  - Local: Marathi, Kannada
- Time zone: UTC+5:30 (IST)
- PIN: 413006
- STD code: 0217
- Vehicle registration: MH-62

Kumbhari is a village in Solapur district, Maharashtra, India. It lies on the suburbs of Solapur, about 12 kilometres east of the city center. As per the 2011 census, the village had a population of 31,044.

== Geography ==
Kumbhari is situated on the crossroads of National Highway 150E and National Highway 465, with the Kumbhari Lake on the south of the village. It has an average elevation of 480 metres above the sea level, and covers an area of 5740 hectares.

== Demographics ==
According to the 2011 Census of India, Kumbhari had a total of 31,044 inhabitants, of which 15,470 are male and 15,574 are female. The working population accounted for 50.91% of the total population. The overall literacy was 64.57%, with 11,270 of the male population and 8,775 of the female population being literate.
