= Bitargaon =

Village in Maharashtra

Coordinates: 19°33′N 77°55′E

- village
- Location in Maharashtra, India Bitargaon (India)
- Country: India
- State: Maharashtra
- District: Solapur district

Languages
  - Official: Marathi
- Time zone: UTC+5:30 (IST)
- PIN: 413203

Bitargaon is a village in the Karmala taluka of Solapur district in Maharashtra state, India.

== Demographics ==
Covering 662 hectares (1,640 acres) and comprising 188 households at the time of the 2011 census of India, Bitargaon had a population of 814. There were 420 males and 394 females, with 111 people being aged six or younger.
