= Barshi Assembly constituency =

Constituency of the Maharashtra legislative assembly in India

Coordinates: 18.24°N 75.69°E

Barshi
- Constituency No. 246 for the Maharashtra Legislative Assembly
- Dilip sopal, present MLA of Barshi

Constituency details
- Country: India
- Region: Western India
- State: Maharashtra
- District: Solapur
- Lok Sabha constituency: Osmanabad
- Established: 1951
- Total electors: 338,062
- Reservation: None

Member of Legislative Assembly
- 15th Maharashtra Legislative Assembly
- Incumbent Dilip Gangadhar Sopal
- Party: SS(UBT)
- Alliance: MVA
- Elected year: 2024

Barshi Assembly constituency is one of the 288 Vidhan Sabha (legislative assembly) constituencies of Maharashtra state, western India. This constituency is located in Solapur district.

== Geographical scope ==
The constituency comprises Barshi taluka.

== Representatives ==
Year	Member	Party
1952	Tulsidas Jadhav	Peasants and Workers Party
1952	Narsing Deshmukh	Peasants and Workers Party
1957	Shivaji Arya	Indian National Congress
1962	Prabhatai Zadbuke	Indian National Congress
1967	Prabhatai Zadbuke	Indian National Congress
1972	Shailaja Shitole	Indian National Congress
1978	Krishnarao Deshmukh	Indian National Congress
1980	Baburao Narke	Indian National Congress (I)
1985	Dilip Sopal	Indian Congress (Socialist)
1990	Dilip Sopal	Indian National Congress
1995	Dilip Sopal	Independent
1999	Dilip Sopal	Nationalist Congress Party
2004	Rajendra Raut	Shiv Sena
2009	Dilip Sopal	Independent
2014	Dilip Sopal	Nationalist Congress Party
2019	Rajendra Raut	Independent
2024	Dilip Sopal	Shiv Sena (UBT)

== Election results ==
=== Assembly Election 2024 ===
2024 Maharashtra Legislative Assembly election : Barshi
Party	Candidate	Votes	%	±%
SS(UBT)	Dilip Gangadhar Sopal	122,694	49.21%	New
SS	Rajendra Raut	1,16,222	46.61%	▲5.18
Independent	Vinod Vikram Jadhav	1,752	0.70%	New
Maharashtra Rajya Samiti	Anand Naganath Yadav	1,741	0.70%	New
NOTA	None of the Above	697	0.28%	▼0.28
Margin of victory		6,472	2.60%	▲1.22
Turnout		2,50,044	73.96%	▲0.98
Total valid votes		2,49,347		
Registered electors		3,38,062		▲10.30
SS(UBT) gain from Independent		Swing	▲6.40	

=== Assembly Election 2019 ===
2019 Maharashtra Legislative Assembly election : Barshi
Party	Candidate	Votes	%	±%
Independent	Rajendra Raut	95,482	42.81%	New
SS	Dilip Gangadhar Sopal	92,406	41.43%	▼2.22
NCP	Niranjan Prakash Bhumkar	16,119	7.23%	▼38.83
Independent	Vishal Bahubali Kalaskar	11,427	5.12%	New
MNS	Nagnath Abhimanu Chavan	2,718	1.22%	New
NOTA	None of the Above	1,255	0.56%	▼0.12
Margin of victory		3,076	1.38%	▼1.03
Turnout		2,24,399	73.21%	▲0.31
Total valid votes		2,23,061		
Registered electors		3,06,507		▲4.75
Independent gain from NCP		Swing	▼3.25	

=== Assembly Election 2014 ===
2014 Maharashtra Legislative Assembly election : Barshi
Party	Candidate	Votes	%	±%
NCP	Dilip Gangadhar Sopal	97,655	46.05%	New
SS	Rajendra Raut	92,544	43.64%	▲34.44
BJP	Rajendra Sukhdev Mirgane	16,506	7.78%	New
BSP	Ganesh Suresh Shinde	1,752	0.83%	▼0.17
INC	Sudhir Vishwambhar Gadhave	1,654	0.78%	▼40.16
NOTA	None of the Above	1,444	0.68%	New
Margin of victory		5,111	2.41%	▼2.79
Turnout		2,13,503	72.96%	▼0.50
Total valid votes		2,12,050		
Registered electors		2,92,613		▲8.82
NCP gain from Independent		Swing	▼0.09	

=== Assembly Election 2009 ===
2009 Maharashtra Legislative Assembly election : Barshi
Party	Candidate	Votes	%	±%
Independent	Dilip Gangadhar Sopal	90,523	46.14%	New
INC	Rajendra Raut	80,314	40.94%	New
SS	Vishwas Arjunrao Barbole	18,051	9.20%	▼41.19
BSP	Ajit Bhaskar Kamble	1,955	1.00%	▲0.21
BBM	Ravindra Sahebrao Patil	1,407	0.72%	New
Margin of victory		10,209	5.20%	▲1.62
Turnout		1,96,251	72.98%	▼6.56
Total valid votes		1,96,193		
Registered electors		2,68,894		▲46.80
Independent gain from SS		Swing	▼4.25	

=== Assembly Election 2004 ===
2004 Maharashtra Legislative Assembly election : Barshi
Party	Candidate	Votes	%	±%
SS	Rajendra Raut	73,401	50.39%	▲5.66
NCP	Dilip Gangadhar Sopal	68,181	46.81%	▲1.75
Independent	Shaikh Vahid Harun	1,588	1.09%	New
Independent	Riyasoddin Ehateshamoddin Inamdar	1,353	0.93%	New
BSP	Dhavare Shashikant Devendera	1,147	0.79%	New
Margin of victory		5,220	3.58%	▲3.26
Turnout		1,45,748	79.57%	▲9.38
Total valid votes		1,45,670		
Registered electors		1,83,176		▲21.80
SS gain from NCP		Swing	▲5.34	

=== Assembly Election 1999 ===
1999 Maharashtra Legislative Assembly election : Barshi
Party	Candidate	Votes	%	±%
NCP	Dilip Gangadhar Sopal	47,527	45.05%	New
SS	Rajendra Raut	47,188	44.73%	▲24.90
INC	Shaikh Abbas Vajir	9,708	9.20%	▼22.53
ABS	Inamdar Biyasoddin Yehtehshamuddin	861	0.82%	New
Margin of victory		339	0.32%	▼4.37
Turnout		1,09,315	72.69%	▼10.00
Total valid votes		1,05,495		
Registered electors		1,50,394		▲3.20
NCP gain from Independent		Swing	▲8.62	

=== Assembly Election 1995 ===
1995 Maharashtra Legislative Assembly election : Barshi
Party	Candidate	Votes	%	±%
Independent	Dilip Gangadhar Sopal	42,545	36.43%	New
INC	Prabhavati Shankarrao Zadbuke	37,061	31.73%	▼18.02
SS	Shashikant Shahu Pawar	23,156	19.83%	▲7.70
BBM	Shaikh Abbas Vajir	12,610	10.80%	New
Margin of victory		5,484	4.70%	▼17.01
Turnout		1,19,256	81.83%	▲16.75
Total valid votes		1,16,794		
Registered electors		1,45,735		▲2.21
Independent gain from INC		Swing	▼13.33	

=== Assembly Election 1990 ===
1990 Maharashtra Legislative Assembly election : Barshi
Party	Candidate	Votes	%	±%
INC	Dilip Gangadhar Sopal	44,974	49.76%	▲6.95
Independent	Deshmukh Krishanarao Nanasaheb	25,356	28.05%	New
SS	Sutre Shrikant Dattatrey	10,960	12.13%	New
JD	Gajabhar Chandrashekhar Revansidha	3,349	3.71%	New
Independent	Thombare Tanaji Annasaheb	2,379	2.63%	New
Independent	Vibhute Nagsen Shivingh	1,332	1.47%	New
Margin of victory		19,618	21.70%	▲8.91
Turnout		92,366	64.78%	▼3.80
Total valid votes		90,389		
Registered electors		1,42,588		▲24.39
INC gain from IC(S)		Swing	▼5.84	

=== Assembly Election 1985 ===
1985 Maharashtra Legislative Assembly election : Barshi
Party	Candidate	Votes	%	±%
IC(S)	Dilip Gangadhar Sopal	42,822	55.59%	New
INC	Patil Baburao Shankarrao (Gadegaonkar)	32,969	42.80%	New
Margin of victory		9,853	12.79%	▲9.41
Turnout		78,359	68.36%	▲4.31
Total valid votes		77,027		
Registered electors		1,14,634		▲7.97
IC(S) gain from INC(I)		Swing	▲6.98	

=== Assembly Election 1980 ===
1980 Maharashtra Legislative Assembly election : Barshi
Party	Candidate	Votes	%	±%
INC(I)	Narake Baburao Mahadev	32,455	48.61%	New
INC(U)	Barbole Arjun Ambrushi	30,195	45.23%	New
BJP	Lohe Gokuldas Madanlal	3,358	5.03%	New
Independent	Pawar Rambhau Aba	541	0.81%	New
Margin of victory		2,260	3.38%	▼5.02
Turnout		68,476	64.49%	▼11.39
Total valid votes		66,766		
Registered electors		1,06,175		▲14.45
INC(I) gain from INC		Swing	▼1.98	

=== Assembly Election 1978 ===
1978 Maharashtra Legislative Assembly election : Barshi
Party	Candidate	Votes	%	±%
INC	Deshmukh Krishanarao Nanasaheb	34,859	50.59%	▼1.15
JP	Surana Pannalal Premraj	29,067	42.19%	New
PWPI	Patil Dnyaneshwar Tatyaba	3,499	5.08%	▼40.24
Independent	Pawar Rambhau Aba	772	1.12%	New
Independent	Nalwade Bajrang Tatyaba	704	1.02%	New
Margin of victory		5,792	8.41%	▲1.98
Turnout		70,667	76.17%	▲6.29
Total valid votes		68,901		
Registered electors		92,771		▲6.15
INC hold		Swing	▼1.15	

=== Assembly Election 1972 ===
1972 Maharashtra Legislative Assembly election : Barshi
Party	Candidate	Votes	%	±%
INC	Shailaja Shitole	30,743	51.74%	▼1.93
PWPI	Patil Dnyaneshwar Tatyaba	26,926	45.32%	New
ABHM	Pawar Rambhau Aba	951	1.60%	New
ABJS	Alatmadhukar Nagnath	793	1.33%	▲0.08
Margin of victory		3,817	6.42%	▼5.02
Turnout		61,016	69.82%	▲2.34
Total valid votes		59,413		
Registered electors		87,394		▲13.37
INC hold		Swing	▼1.93	

=== Assembly Election 1967 ===
1967 Maharashtra Legislative Assembly election : Barshi
Party	Candidate	Votes	%	±%
INC	Prabhatai Shankarrao Zadbuke	27,161	53.67%	▼11.26
SSP	P. P. Surana	21,369	42.23%	New
Independent	Bajarang Tatyaba Nalwade	1,439	2.84%	New
ABJS	V. D. Kulkarni	634	1.25%	New
Margin of victory		5,792	11.45%	▼38.95
Turnout		55,785	72.36%	▼2.63
Total valid votes		50,603		
Registered electors		77,089		▲4.33
INC hold		Swing	▼11.26	

=== Assembly Election 1962 ===
1962 Maharashtra Legislative Assembly election : Barshi
Party	Candidate	Votes	%	±%
INC	Prabhatai Shankarrao Zadbuke	32,757	64.93%	▲16.7
Independent	Narshing Tatya Deshmukh	7,332	14.53%	New
RPI	Ramchandra Genuji Khandale	5,112	10.13%	New
Independent	Chandmal Amarchand Gugale	3,021	5.99%	New
Independent	Krishna Bandu Damare	970	1.92%	New
Independent	Bajarang Tatyaba Nalwade	949	1.88%	New
Margin of victory		25,425	50.40%	▲38.20
Turnout		53,583	72.52%	▲19.23
Total valid votes		50,448		
Registered electors		73,889		▲14.81
INC hold		Swing	▲16.70	

=== Assembly Election 1957 ===
1957 Bombay State Legislative Assembly election : Barshi
Party	Candidate	Votes	%	±%
INC	Arya Shivaji Parshuram	15,224	48.23%	New
PWPI	Buragute Govind Bhau	11,374	36.03%	New
Independent	Dambare Krishna Bandu	4,966	15.73%	New
Margin of victory		3,850	12.20%	
Turnout		31,564	49.04%	
Total valid votes		31,564		
Registered electors		64,358		
INC win (new seat)				
