= Korti (Solapur district) =

Village in Maharashtra

- village
- Location in Maharashtra, India Korti (India)
- Country: India
- State: Maharashtra
- District: Solapur district

Languages
  - Official: Marathi
- Time zone: UTC+5:30 (IST)

Korti is a village in the Karmala taluka of Solapur district in Maharashtra state, India.

== Demographics ==
Covering 1,763 hectares (4,360 acres) and comprising 742 households at the time of the 2011 census of India, Korti had a population of 3341. There were 1753 males and 1588 females, with 343 people being aged six or younger.
