= Nimbhore =

Village in Maharashtra

Coordinates: 21°11′N 76°04′E

- village
- Location in Maharashtra, India Nimbhore (India)
- Country: India
- State: Maharashtra
- District: Solapur district

Languages
  - Official: Marathi
- Time zone: UTC+5:30 (IST)

Nimbhore is a village in the Karmala taluka of Solapur district in Maharashtra state, India.

== Demographics ==
Covering 2,182 hectares (5,390 acres) and comprising 679 households at the time of the 2011 census of India, Nimbhore had a population of 3144. There were 1660 males and 1484 females, with 404 people being aged six or younger.
