= Khatgaon =

Village in Maharashtra

- village
- Location in Maharashtra, India Khatgaon (India)
- Country: India
- State: Maharashtra
- District: Solapur

Languages
  - Official: Marathi
- Time zone: UTC+5:30 (IST)

Khatgaon is a village in the Karmala taluka of Solapur district in Maharashtra state, India.

== Demographics ==
Covering 1,206 hectares (2,980 acres) and comprising 318 households at the time of the 2011 census of India, Khatgaon had a population of 1,457. There were 767 males and 690 females, with 162 people being aged six or younger.
