= Padali, Solapur district =

Village in Maharashtra

Padali
- village
- Location in Maharashtra, India Padali (India)
- Country: India
- State: Maharashtra
- District: Solapur district

Languages
  - Official: Marathi
- Time zone: UTC+5:30 (IST)

Padali is a village in the Karmala taluka of Solapur district in Maharashtra state, India.

== Demographics ==
Covering 835 hectares (2,060 acres) and comprising 318 households at the time of the 2011 census of India, Padali had a population of 1529. There were 819 males and 710 females, with 168 people being aged six or younger.
