= Khadaki =

Khadaki may refer to any of the following places in the Maharashtra state of India:

- Khadaki, Palghar district, a village
- Khadaki, Solapur district, a village
- Khadki, a locality in Pune district
