= Veet, Solapur district =

Village in Maharashtra

Veet
- Village
- Location in Maharashtra, India Veet (India)
- Country: India
- State: Maharashtra
- District: Solapur district

Languages
  - Official: Marathi
- Time zone: UTC+5:30 (IST)

Veet is a village in the Karmala taluka of Solapur district in Maharashtra state, India.

== Demographics ==
Covering 3,874 hectares (9,570 acres) and comprising 1087 households at the time of the 2011 census of India, Veet had a population of 5053. There were 2636 males and 2417 females, with 517 people being aged six or younger.
