= Gaundare =

Village in Maharashtra

- Village
- Location in Maharashtra, India Gaundare (India)
- Country: India
- State: Maharashtra
- District: Solapur district

Languages
  - Official: Marathi
- Time zone: UTC+5:30 (IST)

Gaundare is a village in the Karmala taluka of Solapur district in Maharashtra state, India.

== Demographics ==
Covering 1,571 hectares (3,880 acres) and comprising 415 households at the time of the 2011 census of India, Gaundare had a population of 1848. There were 973 males and 875 females, with 282 people being aged six or younger.
