= Gharatwadi =

Village in Maharashtra

- Village
- Location in Maharashtra, India Gharatwadi (India)
- Country: India
- State: Maharashtra
- District: Solapur district

Languages
  - Official: Marathi
- Time zone: UTC+5:30 (IST)

Gharatwadi is a village in the Karmala taluka of Solapur district in Maharashtra state, India.

== Demographics ==
Covering 450 hectares (1,100 acres) and comprising 97 households at the time of the 2011 census of India, Gharatwadi had a population of 424. There were 220 males and 204 females, with 55 people being aged six or younger.
