= Aljapur =

Village in Maharashtra

- Village
- Location in Maharashtra, India Aljapur (India)
- Coordinates: 18°31′00″N 75°12′46″E
- Country: India
- State: Maharashtra
- District: Solapur district

Languages
  - Official: Marathi
- Time zone: UTC+5:30 (IST)

Aljapur is a village in the Karmala taluka of Solapur district in Maharashtra state, India.

== Demographics ==
Covering 1,030 hectares (2,500 acres) and comprising 345 households at the time of the 2011 census of India, Aljapur had a population of 1668. There were 919 males and 749 females, with 206 people being aged six or younger.
