= Pondhvadi =

Village in Maharashtra

- Village
- Location in Maharashtra, India Pondhvadi (India)
- Country: India
- State: Maharashtra
- District: Solapur district

Languages
  - Official: Marathi
- Time zone: UTC+5:30 (IST)

Pondhvadi is a village in the Karmala taluka of Solapur district in Maharashtra state, India.

== Demographics ==
Covering 1,222 hectares (3,020 acres) and comprising 356 households at the time of the 2011 census of India, Pondhvadi had a population of 1774. There were 928 males and 846 females, with 242 people being aged six or younger.
