= Khambewadi =

Village in Maharashtra

Coordinates: 19°48′N 76°14′E

- Village
- Location in Maharashtra, India Khambewadi (India)
- Country: India
- State: Maharashtra
- District: Solapur district

Languages
  - Official: Marathi
- Time zone: UTC+5:30 (IST)

Khambewadi is a village in the Karmala taluka of Solapur district in Maharashtra state, India.

== Demographics ==
Covering 585 hectares (1,450 acres) and comprising 201 households at the time of the 2011 census of India, Khambewadi had a population of 1031. There were 537 males and 494 females, with 134 people being aged six or younger.
