= Nimgaon (H) =

Village in Maharashtra

- Village
- Location in Maharashtra, India Nimgaon (H) (India)
- Coordinates: 18°20′31″N 75°20′54″E
- Country: India
- State: Maharashtra
- District: Solapur district

Languages
  - Official: Marathi
- Time zone: UTC+5:30 (IST)

Nimgaon (H) is a village in the Karmala taluka of Solapur district in Maharashtra state, India.

== Demographics ==
Covering 946 hectares (2,340 acres) and comprising 219 households at the time of the 2011 census of India, Nimgaon (H) had a population of 1043. There were 559 males and 484 females, with 122 people being aged six or younger.
