= Sarapdoh =

Village in Maharashtra

- Village
- Location in Maharashtra, India Sarapdoh (India)
- Country: India
- State: Maharashtra
- District: Solapur district

Languages
  - Official: Marathi
- Time zone: UTC+5:30 (IST)

Sarapdoh is a village in the Karmala taluka of Solapur district in Maharashtra state, India.

== Demographics ==
Covering 757 hectares (1,870 acres) and comprising 200 households at the time of the 2011 census of India, Sarapdoh had a population of 894. There were 478 males and 416 females, with 92 people being aged six or younger.
