= Awati =

Village in Maharashtra

- Village
- Location in Maharashtra, India Awati (India)
- Coordinates: 18°18′26″N 75°20′36″E
- Country: India
- State: Maharashtra
- District: Solapur district

Languages
  - Official: Marathi
- Time zone: UTC+5:30 (IST)

Awati is a village in the Karmala taluka of Solapur district in Maharashtra state, India. It is Famous For Sufi Saint Sufi Hazrat Chand Pasha Qadri Qalandar Darvesh.

== Demographics ==
Covering 1,180 hectares (2,900 acres) and comprising 340 households at the time of the 2011 census of India, Awati had a population of 1872. There were 955 males and 917 females, with 220 people being aged six or younger.
