= Hiwarwadi =

Village in Maharashtra

- Village
- Location in Maharashtra, India Hiwarwadi (India)
- Coordinates: 18.4321797°N 75.1580652°E
- Country: India
- State: Maharashtra
- District: Solapur district

Languages
  - Official: Marathi
- Time zone: UTC+5:30 (IST)

Hiwarwadi is a village in the Karmala taluka of Solapur district in Maharashtra state, India.

== Demographics ==
Covering 385 hectares (950 acres) and comprising 156 households at the time of the 2011 census of India, Hiwarwadi had a population of 824. There were 436 males and 388 females, with 82 people being aged six or younger.
