= North Wadgaon =

Village in Maharashtra

- village
- Location in Maharashtra, India North Wadgaon (India)
- Country: India
- State: Maharashtra
- District: Solapur district

Languages
  - Official: Marathi
- Time zone: UTC+5:30 (IST)

North Wadgaon is a village in the Karmala taluka of Solapur district in Maharashtra state, India. Around 12 Km from Tahsil Karmala, it is close to Mangi dam.

== Demographics ==
Covering 1,010 hectares (2,500 acres) and comprising 281 households at the time of the 2011 census of India, Wadgaon (N) had a population of 1330. There were 681 males and 649 females, with 188 people being aged six or younger.
