= Kugaon =

Village in Maharashtra

Kugaon Koormgram
- Village
- Nickname: koormateerth
- Location in Maharashtra, India Kugaon (India)
- Country: India
- State: Maharashtra
- District: Solapur district

Government
  - Type: Maharashtra

Languages
  - Official: Marathi
- Time zone: UTC+5:30 (IST)
- PIN: 413202

Kugaon is a village in the Karmala taluka of Solapur district in Maharashtra state, India In the 33rd chapter of Bhima Mahatmya, Rambhakta Hanuman was born in Kugav village

== Demographics ==
Covering 1,554 hectares (3,840 acres) and comprising 348 households at the time of the 2011 census of India, Kugaon had a population of 1806. There were 948 males and 858 females, with 242 people being aged six or younger.
