= Alsunde =

Village in Maharashtra

- Village
- Location in Maharashtra, India Alsunde (India)
- Coordinates: 18°16′37″N 75°17′42″E
- Country: India
- State: Maharashtra
- District: Solapur district

Languages
  - Official: Marathi
- Time zone: UTC+5:30 (IST)

Alsunde is a village in the Karmala taluka of Solapur district in Maharashtra state, India.

== Demographics ==
Covering 809 hectares (2,000 acres) and comprising 237 households at the time of the 2011 census of India, Alsunde had a population of 1102. There were 586 males and 516 females, with 132 people being aged six or younger.
