= Lavhe =

Village in Maharashtra

- Village
- Location in Maharashtra, India Lavhe (India)
- Country: India
- State: Maharashtra
- District: Solapur district

Government
  - Type: Gramin
  - Body: Grampanchayat

Languages
  - Official: Marathi
- Time zone: UTC+5:30 (IST)
- PIN: 413202

Lavhe is a village in the Karmala taluka of Solapur district in Maharashtra state, India.

== Demographics ==
Covering 1,243 hectares (3,070 acres) and comprising 282 households at the time of the 2011 census of India, Lavhe had a population of 1367. There were 716 males and 651 females, with 180 people being aged six or younger.
