= Ketur =

Village in Maharashtra

Coordinates: 18°16′N 74°58′E

- Village
- Location in Maharashtra, India Ketur (India)
- Country: India
- State: Maharashtra
- District: Solapur district

Languages
  - Official: Marathi
- Time zone: UTC+5:30 (IST)

Ketur is a village in the Karmala taluka of Solapur district in Maharashtra state, India.

== Demographics ==
Covering 1,579 hectares (3,900 acres) and comprising 820 households at the time of the 2011 census of India, Ketur had a population of 3920. There were 2046 males and 1874 females, with 452 people being aged six or younger.
