= Manjargaon =

Village in Maharashtra

- Village
- Location in Maharashtra, India Manjargaon (India)
- Country: India
- State: Maharashtra
- District: Solapur district

Languages
  - Official: Marathi
- Time zone: UTC+5:30 (IST)

Manjargaon is a village in the Karmala taluka of Solapur district in Maharashtra state, India.

== Demographics ==
Covering 640 hectares (1,600 acres) and comprising 272 households at the time of the 2011 census of India, Manjargaon had a population of 1333. There were 722 males and 611 females, with 162 people being aged six or younger.
