= Hilvare =

Village in Maharashtra

- Village
- Location in Maharashtra, India Hilvare (India)
- Country: India
- State: Maharashtra
- District: Solapur district

Languages
  - Official: Marathi
- Time zone: UTC+5:30 (IST)

Hilvare is a village in the Karmala taluka of Solapur district in Maharashtra state, India.

== Demographics ==
Covering 1,240 hectares (3,100 acres) and comprising 359 households at the time of the 2011 census of India, Hilvare had a population of 1425. There were 748 males and 677 females, with 192 people being aged six or younger.
