= Anjandoh =

Village in Maharashtra

- Village
- Location in Maharashtra, India Anjandoh (India)
- Coordinates: 18°21′01″N 75°05′27″E
- Country: India
- State: Maharashtra
- District: Solapur district

Languages
  - Official: Marathi
- Time zone: UTC+5:30 (IST)

Anjandoh is a village in the Karmala taluka of Solapur district in Maharashtra state, India.

== Demographics ==
Covering 1,594 hectares (3,940 acres) and comprising 461 households at the time of the 2011 census of India, Anjandoh had a population of 1934. There were 1010 males and 924 females, with 232 people being aged six or younger.
