= Wadgaon Kh =

Village in Maharashtra

- village
- Location in Maharashtra, India Wadgaon Kh (India)
- Country: India
- State: Maharashtra
- District: Solapur district

Languages
  - Official: Marathi
- Time zone: UTC+5:30 (IST)

Wadgaon Kh is a village in the Karmala taluka of Solapur district in Maharashtra state, India.

== Demographics ==
Covering 523 hectares (1,290 acres) and comprising 169 households at the time of the 2011 census of India, Wadgaon Kh had a population of 762. There were 399 males and 363 females, with 104 people being aged six or younger.
