= Divegavan =

Village in Maharashtra

- Village
- Location in Maharashtra, India Divegavan (India)
- Country: India
- State: Maharashtra
- District: Solapur district

Languages
  - Official: Marathi
- Time zone: UTC+5:30 (IST)

Divegavan is a village in the Karmala taluka of Solapur district in Maharashtra state, India.

== Demographics ==
Covering 880 hectares (2,200 acres) and comprising 207 households at the time of the 2011 census of India, Divegavan had a population of 983. There were 519 males and 464 females, with 98 people being aged six or younger.
