= Warkatne =

Village in Maharashtra

- village
- Location in Maharashtra, India Warkatne (India)
- Coordinates: 18°17′23″N 75°13′20″E
- Country: India
- State: Maharashtra
- District: Solapur district

Languages
  - Official: Marathi
- Time zone: UTC+5:30 (IST)

Warkatne is a village in the Karmala taluka of Solapur district in Maharashtra state, India.

== History ==
Warkatne have Gadhi of Sardar Tanpure-Desai(Deshmukh). The Gadhi was spread over 36 acres. In the past, the administrative affairs of the surrounding villages were carried out from here.

== Demographics ==
Covering 1,582 hectares (3,910 acres) and comprising 330 households at the time of the 2011 census of India, Warkatne had a population of 1702. There were 912 males and 790 females, with 192 people being aged six or younger.
