= Washibe =

Village in Maharashtra

- village
- Location in Maharashtra, India Washibe (India)
- Country: India
- State: Maharashtra
- District: Solapur district

Languages
  - Official: Marathi
- Time zone: UTC+5:30 (IST)

Washibe is a village in the Karmala taluka of Solapur district in Maharashtra state, India.

== Demographics ==
Covering 1,993 hectares (4,920 acres) and comprising 561 households at the time of the 2011 census of India, Washibe had a population of 2782. There were 1466 males and 1316 females, with 324 people being aged six or younger.
