= Bhalewadi =

Village in Maharashtra

- Village
- Location in Maharashtra, India Bhalewadi (India)
- Country: India
- State: Maharashtra
- District: Solapur district

Languages
  - Official: Marathi
- Time zone: UTC+5:30 (IST)

Bhalewadi is a village in the Karmala taluka of Solapur district in Maharashtra state, India.

== Demographics ==
Covering 598 hectares (1,480 acres) and comprising 192 households at the time of the 2011 census of India, Bhalewadi had a population of 1094. There were 572 males and 522 females, with 148 people being aged six or younger.
