= Gulmarwadi =

Village in Maharashtra

- Village
- Location in Maharashtra, India Gulmarwadi (India)
- Country: India
- State: Maharashtra
- District: Solapur district

Languages
  - Official: Marathi
- Time zone: UTC+5:30 (IST)

Gulmarwadi is a village in the Karmala taluka of Solapur district in Maharashtra state, India.

== Demographics ==
Covering 438 hectares (1,080 acres) and comprising 103 households at the time of the 2011 census of India, Gulmarwadi had a population of 533. There were 271 males and 262 females, with 95 people being aged six or younger.
