= Jehunwadi =

Village in Maharashtra

- Village
- Location in Maharashtra, India Jehunwadi (India)
- Country: India
- State: Maharashtra
- District: Solapur district

Languages
  - Official: Marathi
- Time zone: UTC+5:30 (IST)

Jehunwadi is a village in the Karmala taluka of Solapur district in Maharashtra state, India.

== Demographics ==
Covering 446 hectares (1,100 acres) and comprising 190 households at the time of the 2011 census of India, Jehunwadi had a population of 909. There were 465 males and 444 females, with 121 people being aged six or younger.
