= Taratgaon =

Village in Maharashtra

- village
- Location in Maharashtra, India Taratgaon (India)
- Country: India
- State: Maharashtra
- District: Solapur district

Languages
  - Official: Marathi
- Time zone: UTC+5:30 (IST)

Taratgaon is a village in the Karmala taluka of Solapur district in Maharashtra state, India.

== Demographics ==
Covering 692 hectares (1,710 acres) and comprising 132 households at the time of the 2011 census of India, Taratgaon had a population of 601. There were 306 males and 295 females, with 53 people being aged six or younger.
