= Kawalwadi =

Village in Maharashtra

- Village
- Location in Maharashtra, India Kawalwadi (India)
- Coordinates: 18.34°N 74.87°E
- Country: India
- State: Maharashtra
- District: Solapur
- Elevation: 506 m (1,660 ft)

Population (2011 Census of India)
  - Total: 845

Languages
  - Official: Marathi
- Time zone: UTC+5:30 (IST)
- PIN: 413203
- Telephone code: 912182-247637
- Vehicle registration: MH-45

Kawalwadi is a village in Solapur District in Karmala Tahsil of Maharashtra state, India.

== Demographics ==
Covering 505 hectares (1,250 acres) and comprising 148 households at the time of the 2011 census of India

== Education ==
In Kawalwadi, the zilla panchayat administers a primary school up to 4th Standard. Thereafter, students have to go 3 kilometres (1.9 mi) to Jinnti for schooling.
