= Pimpalwadi, Solapur district =

Village in Maharashtra

Pimpalwadi
- Village
- Location in Maharashtra, India Pimpalwadi (India)
- Country: India
- State: Maharashtra
- District: Solapur district

Languages
  - Official: Marathi
- Time zone: UTC+5:30 (IST)

Pimpalwadi is a village in the Barshi taluka of Solapur district in Maharashtra state, India.

== Demographics ==
Covering 1,018 hectares (2,520 acres) and comprising 212 households at the time of the 2011 census of India, Pimpalwadi had a population of 942. There were 493 males and 449 females, with 115 people being aged six or younger.
