= Limbewadi =

Ahilyanagar

Coordinates: 18°53′N 76°48′E

- Village
- Location in Maharashtra, India Limbewadi (India)
- Country: India
- State: Maharashtra
- District: Solapur district

Languages
  - Official: Marathi
- Time zone: UTC+5:30 (IST)

Limbewadi is a village in the Karmala taluka of Solapur district in Maharashtra state, India. This village is on the border of Solapur and Ahmednagar district in Maharashtra state. This village has ISO certified Z.P. Primary school up to 4th standard. Agriculture is the main profession of this village.

== Demographics ==
Covering 745 hectares (1,840 acres) and comprising 109 households at the time of the 2011 census of India, Limbewadi had a population of 521. There were 266 males and 255 females, with 71 people being aged six or younger.
