= Pothare =

Village in Maharashtra

- Village
- Location in Maharashtra, India Pothare (India)
- Country: India
- State: Maharashtra
- District: Solapur district

Area
  - Total: 2,117 ha (5,230 acres)

Population (2011 census)
  - Total: 3,882
  - Density: 183.4/km^{2} (474.9/sq mi)

Languages
  - Official: Marathi
- Time zone: UTC+5:30 (IST)

Pothare is a village in the Karmala taluka of Solapur district in Maharashtra state, India.

== Demographics ==
Covering 2,117 hectares (5,230 acres) and comprising 794 households at the time of the 2011 census of India, Pothare had a population of 3882. There were 2031 males and 1851 females, with 477 people being aged six or younger.
