= Ritewadi =

Village in Maharashtra

- Village
- Location in Maharashtra, India Ritewadi (India)
- Country: India
- State: Maharashtra
- District: Solapur district

Languages
  - Official: Marathi
- Time zone: UTC+5:30 (IST)

Ritewadi is a village in the Karmala taluka of Solapur district in Maharashtra state, India.

== Demographics ==
Covering 315 hectares (780 acres) and comprising 98 households at the time of the 2011 census of India, Ritewadi had a population of 522. There were 276 males and 246 females, with 70 people being aged six or younger.
