= Hingani =

Village in Maharashtra

- village
- Location in Maharashtra, India Hingani (India)
- Coordinates: 21.0887848°N 77.2007252°E
- Country: India
- State: Maharashtra
- District: Solapur district

Languages
  - Official: Marathi
- Time zone: UTC+5:30 (IST)

Hingani is a village in the Karmala taluka of Solapur district in Maharashtra state, India.

== Demographics ==
Covering 1,054 hectares (2,600 acres) and comprising 248 households at the time of the 2011 census of India, Hingani had a population of 1152. There were 611 males and 541 females, with 131 people being aged six or younger.

== See also ==
- Hingani Dam
