= Pophalaj =

Village in Maharashtra

- Village
- Location in Maharashtra, India Pophalaj (India)
- Country: India
- State: Maharashtra
- District: Solapur district

Languages
  - Official: Marathi
- Time zone: UTC+5:30 (IST)

Pophalaj is a village in the Karmala taluka of Solapur district in Maharashtra state, India.

== Demographics ==
Covering 1,386 hectares (3,420 acres) and comprising 439 households at the time of the 2011 census of India, Pophalaj had a population of 2190. There were 1132 males and 1058 females, with 285 people being aged six or younger.
