= Nerle =

Village in Maharashtra

- Village
- Location in Maharashtra, India Nerle (India)
- Country: India
- State: Maharashtra
- District: Solapur district

Languages
  - Official: Marathi
- Time zone: UTC+5:30 (IST)

Nerle is a village in the Karmala taluka of Solapur district in Maharashtra state, India.

== Demographics ==
Covering 2,875 hectares (7,100 acres) and comprising 496 households at the time of the 2011 census of India, Nerle had a population of 2636. There were 1372 males and 1264 females, with 335 people being aged six or younger.
