= Vihal =

Village in Maharashtra

- village
- Location in Maharashtra, India Vihal (India)
- Country: India
- State: Maharashtra
- District: Solapur district

Languages
  - Official: Marathi
- Time zone: UTC+5:30 (IST)
- PIN: 413203

Vihal is a village in the Karmala taluka of Solapur district in Maharashtra state, India.

== Demographics ==
Covering 1,331 hectares (3,290 acres) and comprising 355 households at the time of the 2011 census of India, Vihal had a population of 1590. There were 833 males and 757 females, with 185 people being aged six or younger.
