= Bhagatwadi =

Village in Maharashtra

- Village
- Location in Maharashtra, India Bhagatwadi (India)
- Country: India
- State: Maharashtra
- District: Solapur district

Languages
  - Official: Marathi
- Time zone: UTC+5:30 (IST)

Bhagatwadi is a village in the Karmala taluka of Solapur district in the Indian state of Maharashtra. The village is situated behind Ujjani Dam. The main occupation is sugarcane cultivation.

== Geography ==
The village is situated near Pune Solapur railway line, known as central railway.

It covers 644 hectares (1,590 acres).

== Demographics ==
Bhagatwadi comprises 170 households as of the 2011 census of India. Its population numbered 823, including 448 males and 375 females, with 93 people aged six or younger.
