= Hulgewadi =

Village in Maharashtra, India

- Village
- Location in Maharashtra, India Hulgewadi (India)
- Coordinates: 18.4239296°N 75.0201504°E
- Country: India
- State: Maharashtra
- District: Solapur district

Languages
  - Official: Marathi
- Time zone: UTC+5:30 (IST)

Hulgewadi is a village in the Karmala taluka of Solapur district in Maharashtra state, India.

== Demographics ==
Covering 1,018 hectares (2,520 acres) and comprising 98 households at the time of the 2011 census of India, Hulgewadi had a population of 429. There were 222 males and 207 females, with 55 people being aged six or younger.
