= Sounde =

Village in Maharashtra

- Village
- Location in Maharashtra, India Sounde (India)
- Country: India
- State: Maharashtra
- District: Solapur district

Languages
  - Official: Marathi
- Time zone: UTC+5:30 (IST)

Sounde is a village in the Karmala taluka of Solapur district in Maharashtra state, India.

== Demographics ==
Covering 1,365 hectares (3,370 acres) and comprising 311 households at the time of the 2011 census of India, Sounde had a population of 1,346. There were 723 males and 623 females, with 160 people being aged six or younger.
