= Potegaon =

Village in Maharashtra

- Village
- Location in Maharashtra, India Potegaon (India)
- Country: India
- State: Maharashtra
- District: Solapur district

Languages
  - Official: Marathi
- Time zone: UTC+5:30 (IST)

Potegaon is a village in the Karmala taluka of Solapur district in Maharashtra state, India.

== Demographics ==
Covering 779 hectares (1,920 acres) and comprising 163 households at the time of the 2011 census of India, Potegaon had a population of 687. There were 370 males and 317 females, with 67 people being aged six or younger.
