= Valsang =

Village in Maharashtra

- Village
- Location in Maharashtra, India Valsang (India)
- Coordinates: 17°36′0″N 76°5′0″E
- Country: India
- State: Maharashtra
- District: Solapur

Population (2011)
  - Total: 7,979

Languages
  - Official: Marathi
- Time zone: UTC+5:30 (IST)

Valsang (also known as Balsing) is a village between Solapur and Akkalkot in western India. It is in the Solapur district of Maharashtra, within the Solapur South block.

Valsang is the destination of a famous pilgrimage for Shri Swami Samartha Maharaj. The village has a dargah or grave shrine for Yaseen Saheb dating back five hundred years. Muslims in the village celebrate the urs or death anniversary of Yasin Saheb Dargah.

== History ==
Valsang is the destination of a famous pilgrimage for Shri Swami Samartha Maharaj.

In 1884, the Sholapur District Gazetteer described Valsang as a market town of some importance, with a dyeing and weaving industry that generated £10,000 (Rs. 1,00,000) a year. This estimate included the manufacture of indigo and sarangi dyes used on locally produced cotton thread, cotton cloth, and a cheap quality of silk called "Panjam". Women's robes of Panjim are known as Valsangacha Band and were traditionally worn by all classes except Brahmans.

== Geography ==
Valsang consists of 2,957 hectares (7,310 acres). The village is surrounded by farms and small villages. It is 24 km (15 mi) from Solapur and 15 km (9 mi) from Akkalkot.

== Demographics ==
Valsang has a population of 7,979 people, according to the 2011 census. Of that number, 4,039 are male and 3,940 are female. The village has a literacy rate of 67.53%, with 73.68% of males and 61.22% of females being literate. The village includes 1,579 houses.

== Economy ==
Valsang's main industries are farming and small shops. Rice, grown in paddy fields, is the main agricultural product. The village's weekly market is held every Wednesday.

Remnants of the historic dyeing and weaving industry remain. The Swami Samarth Suth Girni (cotton mill) is located on Akkakote Road. The village specializes in weaving saris. However, most dyes used are now chemical, which decreased the need for the manufacture of dyes.

Some residents of the village work in Solapur, the nearest town for major economic activities.

== Arts and culture ==
=== Events and festivals ===
Valsang hosts many fairs or Jatra every year. The main events are Shankar Linga Jatra, Chowdeshwary Devi Fair, Basavvana Jatra, and Siddeshwar Jatra.

Shankar Linga Jatra is an annual fair. In the evening, villagers carry Nandi Kol (Long Holi Stick). The next day, a Pallaki Utsav god statue arrives and there is a Natak or staged play. At the end of the fair, there is free curry food (kharbheli). Young villagers collect money so they can make the curry, and villagers bring roti (bread) from their homes and use it to eat the curry.

The Chowdamma Devi Fair takes place in May or June. The fair is well known for its BalBatla which is the Kannada word for a plate containing the fire. BalBatla is made up of silver and it is held by a person who is believed to take the form of Chowdamma Devi. During the fair, people follow this person for the whole night. This Balbatla Jatra is covered live on Solapur Vruth Darshan, the local news channel for the Solapur district.

Villagers also celebrate Shiv Jayanti on 19 February. During this celebration, there is music and children ride a statue of Shivaji around the village. Muslims villager celebrate the urs or death anniversary of Yasin Saheb Dargah.

=== Architecture ===
The village has a dargah of Yaseen Saheb dating back five hundred years. There is a Hutatma Smarak or memorial square that was constructed on the Solapur - Akkalkote Road by the Maharashtra government; this is a gathering place for the village elders.

== Government ==
Valsang has a post office and a police station, the jurisdiction of which extends over thirty-six villages.

== Education ==
Valsang has three primary schools, one each with Marathi, Kannada, and Urdu as the primary language of instruction. There is one high school, Shri Shankarling High School, with instruction in both Marathi and Kannada.

== Infrastructure ==
=== Transportation ===
The government bus provides transportation between Valsang and Solapur. This route is also accessible by private jeep.

=== Utilities ===
The village is electrified. Wells are the main source of drinking water.
