= Kondhej =

Village in Maharashtra

- Village
- Location in Maharashtra, India Kondhej (India)
- Country: India
- State: Maharashtra
- District: Solapur district

Languages
  - Official: Marathi
- Time zone: UTC+5:30 (IST)

Kondhej is a village in the Karmala taluka of Solapur district in Maharashtra state, India.

== Demographics ==
Covering 941 hectares (2,330 acres) and comprising 527 households at the time of the 2011 census of India, Kondhej had a population of 2347. There were 1201 males and 1146 females, with 283 people being aged six or younger.
