= Phisare =

Village in Maharashtra

- Village
- Location in Maharashtra, India Phisare (India)
- Country: India
- State: Maharashtra
- District: Solapur district

Languages
  - Official: Marathi
- Time zone: UTC+5:30 (IST)

Phisare is a village in the Karmala taluka of Solapur district in Maharashtra state, India.

== Demographics ==
Covering 862 hectares (2,130 acres) and comprising 281 households at the time of the 2011 census of India, Phisare had a population of 1374. There were 742 males and 632 females, with 149 people being aged six or younger.
