= Roshewadi =

Village in Maharashtra

- Village
- Location in Maharashtra, India Roshewadi (India)
- Country: India
- State: Maharashtra
- District: Solapur district

Languages
  - Official: Marathi
- Time zone: UTC+5:30 (IST)

Roshewadi is a village in the Karmala taluka of Solapur district in Maharashtra state, India.

== Demographics ==
Covering 529 hectares (1,310 acres) and comprising 172 households at the time of the 2011 census of India, Roshewadi had a population of 917. There were 488 males and 429 females, with 101 people being aged six or younger.
