= Jategaon, Solapur district =

Village in Maharashtra

Jategaon
- village
- Location in Maharashtra, India Jategaon (India)
- Country: India
- State: Maharashtra
- District: Solapur district

Languages
  - Official: Marathi
- Time zone: UTC+5:30 (IST)
- Postal code: 413203

Jategaon is a village in the Karmala taluka of Solapur district in Maharashtra state, India.

== Demographics ==
Covering 1,905 hectares (4,710 acres) and comprising 445 households at the time of the 2011 census of India, Jategaon had a population of 2208. There were 1164 males and 1044 females, with 295 people being aged six or younger.
