= Kumbhej =

Village in Maharashtra

- Village
- Location in Maharashtra, India Kumbhej (India)
- Country: India
- State: Maharashtra
- District: Solapur district

Languages
  - Official: Marathi
- Time zone: UTC+5:30 (IST)

Kumbhej is a village in the Karmala taluka of Solapur district in Maharashtra state, India.

== Demographics ==
Covering 2,234 hectares (5,520 acres) and comprising 689 households at the time of the 2011 census of India, Kumbhej had a population of 2638. There were 1343 males and 1295 females, with 297 people being aged six or younger.

Kumbhej has Zilla Parishad Primary school for up to 7th standard and Digambarrao Bagal high school up to the 10th standard. Zilla Parishad school is well known for its quality education in the area and has student enrollment from neighboring villages like Pophlaj, Kondhej, etc. Main water source of the village is lake which is fed with water from Ujni dam occasionally. Farming is primary occupation.

== Festivals and temples ==
Each year on full moon day of Chaitra month of Hindu calendar, Kumbhej celebrates a Hanuman Jayanti and has large procession gathering of Lord Jyotirlinga. Kumbhej has many temples including Vitthal-Rukhmai, Mahadev, Hanuman, Jyotirling, Maribai, Yamai, Ambabai and Firangai. Daily Sant Dnyaneshwara's Haripath is chanted in Vitthal temple and on various auspicious occasions, 7 day long Harinam Saptah is organized. There is also a mosque for offering Namaz for Muslim citizens of the village.
