= Shelgaon, Solapur district =

Village in Maharashtra

Shelgaon
- Village
- Location in Maharashtra, India Shelgaon (India)
- Country: India
- State: Maharashtra
- District: Solapur district

Languages
  - Official: Marathi
- Time zone: UTC+5:30 (IST)

Shelgaon is a village in the Karmala taluka of Solapur district in Maharashtra state, India.

== Demographics ==
Covering 813 hectares (2,010 acres) and comprising 335 households at the time of the 2011 census of India, Shelgaon had a population of 1473. There were 760 males and 713 females, with 170 people being aged six or younger.
