= Karmala (Rural) =

Village in Maharashtra

- village
- Location in Maharashtra, India Karmala (Rural) (India)
- Country: India
- State: Maharashtra
- District: Solapur district

Languages
  - Official: Marathi
- Time zone: UTC+5:30 (IST)

Karmala (Rural) is a village in the Karmala taluka of Solapur district in Maharashtra state, India.

== Demographics ==
Covering 2,089 hectares (5,160 acres) and comprising 265 households at the time of the 2011 census of India, Karmala (Rural) had a population of 1280. There were 670 males and 610 females, with 167 people being aged six or younger.
