= Bhilarwadi =

Village in Maharashtra

- Village
- Location in Maharashtra, India Bhilarwadi (India)
- Country: India
- State: Maharashtra
- District: Solapur district

Languages
  - Official: Marathi
- Time zone: UTC+5:30 (IST)

Bhilarwadi is a village in the Karmala taluka of Solapur district in Maharashtra state, India.

== Demographics ==
Covering 993 hectares (2,450 acres) and comprising 327 households at the time of the 2011 census of India, Bhilarwadi had a population of 1593. There were 839 males and 754 females, with 233 people being aged six or younger.
