= Kuskarwadi =

Village in Maharashtra

- Village
- Location in Maharashtra, India Kuskarwadi (India)
- Country: India
- State: Maharashtra
- District: Solapur district

Languages
  - Official: Marathi
- Time zone: UTC+5:30 (IST)

Kuskarwadi is a village in the Karmala taluka of Solapur district in Maharashtra state, India.

== Demographics ==
Covering 428 hectares (1,060 acres) and comprising 93 households at the time of the 2011 census of India, Kuskarwadi had a population of 333. There were 175 males and 158 females, with 15 people being aged six or younger.
