= Gorewadi =

Village in Maharashtra

- Village
- Location in Maharashtra, India Gorewadi (India)
- Country: India
- State: Maharashtra
- District: Solapur district
- Established: In between 1800-1900(it is not Completely True)

Language
  - Languages: Marathi
- Time zone: UTC+5:30 (IST)
- PIN: 413203

Gorewadi is a village in the Karmala taluka of Solapur district in Maharashtra state, India. It is famous for a historical folklore involving a "fallen star". A lake is said to be formed from its impact. Another special feature is that the lake gets water throughout the year.

== Demographics ==
Covering 689 hectares (1,700 acres) and comprising 134 households at the time of the 2011 census of India, Gorewadi had a population of 635. There were 335 males and 300 females, with 98 people being aged six or younger.
