= Jinnti =

Village in Maharashtra

- village
- Location in Maharashtra, India Jinnti (India)
- Country: India
- State: Maharashtra
- District: Solapur district

Languages
  - Official: Marathi
- Time zone: UTC+5:30 (IST)

Jinnti is a village in the Karmala taluka of Solapur district in Maharashtra state, India.

== Demographics ==
Covering 2,646 hectares (6,540 acres) and comprising 602 households at the time of the 2011 census of India, Jinnti had a population of 2710. There were 1393 males and 1317 females, with 385 people being aged six or younger.
