= Pomalwadi =

Village in Maharashtra

- Village
- Location in Maharashtra, India Pomalwadi (India)
- Country: India
- State: Maharashtra
- District: Solapur district

Languages
  - Official: Marathi
- Time zone: UTC+5:30 (IST)

Pomalwadi is a village in the Karmala taluka of Solapur district in Maharashtra state, India.

== Demographics ==
Covering 899 hectares (2,220 acres) and comprising 238 households at the time of the 2011 census of India, Pomalwadi had a population of 1130. There were 574 males and 556 females, with 140 people being aged six or younger.
