= Ravgaon =

Village in Maharashtra

- Village
- Location in Maharashtra, India Ravgaon (India)
- Country: India
- State: Maharashtra
- District: Solapur district

Languages
  - Official: Marathi
- Time zone: UTC+5:30 (IST)

Ravgaon is a village in the Karmala taluka of Solapur district in Maharashtra state, India.

== Demographics ==
Covering 2,629 hectares (6,500 acres) and comprising 796 households at the time of the 2011 census of India, Ravgaon had a population of 3613. There were 1876 males and 1737 females, with 435 people being aged six or younger.
