= Gulsadi =

Village in Maharashtra

- Village
- Location in Maharashtra, India Gulsadi (India)
- Country: India
- State: Maharashtra
- District: Solapur district

Languages
  - Official: Marathi
- Time zone: UTC+5:30 (IST)

Gulsadi is a village in the Karmala taluka of Solapur district in Maharashtra state, India.

== Demographics ==
Covering 1,864 hectares (4,610 acres) and comprising 502 households at the time of the 2011 census of India, Gulsadi had a population of 2227. There were 1172 males and 1055 females, with 266 people being aged six or younger.
