= Sogaon =

Village in Maharashtra

Coordinates: 18°25′N 82°48′E

- village
- Location in Maharashtra, India Sogaon (India)
- Country: India
- State: Maharashtra
- District: Solapur district

Languages
  - Official: Marathi
- Time zone: UTC+5:30 (IST)

Sogaon is a village in the Karmala taluka of Solapur district in Maharashtra state, India.

== Demographics ==
Covering 1,881 hectares (4,650 acres) and comprising 519 households at the time of the 2011 census of India, Sogaon had a population of 2533. There were 1319 males and 1214 females, with 369 people being aged six or younger.
