= Dhaykhindi =

Village in Maharashtra

- Village
- Location in Maharashtra, India Dhaykhindi (India)
- Country: India
- State: Maharashtra
- District: Solapur district

Languages
  - Official: Marathi
- Time zone: UTC+5:30 (IST)

Dhaykhindi is a village in the Karmala taluka of Solapur district in Maharashtra state, India.

== Demographics ==
Covering 517 hectares (1,280 acres) and comprising 167 households at the time of the 2011 census of India, Dhaykhindi had a population of 958. There were 487 males and 471 females, with 144 people being aged six or younger.
