= Parewadi =

Village in Maharashtra

- Village
- Location in Maharashtra, India Parewadi (India)
- Country: India
- State: Maharashtra
- District: Solapur district

Government
  - Type: panchayat

Languages
  - Official: Marathi
- Time zone: UTC+5:30 (IST)

Parewadi is a village in the Karmala taluka of Solapur district in Maharashtra state, India.It is located near the back waters of Ujjani dam.

== Demographics ==
Covering 1,267 hectares (3,130 acres) and comprising 364 households at the time of the 2011 census of India, Parewadi had a population of 1828. There were 968 males and 860 females, with 226 people being aged six or younger.
