= Karanje =

Village in Maharashtra

- Village
- Location in Maharashtra, India Karanje (India)
- Country: India
- State: Maharashtra
- District: Solapur district

Languages
  - Official: Marathi
- Time zone: UTC+5:30 (IST)

Karanje is a village in the Karmala taluka of Solapur district in Maharashtra state, India.

== Demographics ==
Covering 1,005 hectares (2,480 acres) and comprising 420 households at the time of the 2011 census of India, Karanje had a population of 1799. There were 958 males and 841 females, with 184 people being aged six or younger.
