= Sade, Solapur district =

Village in Maharashtra

Coordinates: 18°17′N 75°17′E

Sade
- village
- Location in Maharashtra, India Sade (India)
- Country: India
- State: Maharashtra
- District: Solapur district

Languages
  - Official: Marathi
- Time zone: UTC+5:30 (IST)

Sade is a village in the Karmala taluka of Solapur district in Maharashtra state, India.

== Demographics ==
Covering 3,266 hectares (8,070 acres) and comprising 1077 households at the time of the 2011 census of India, Sade had a population of 4576. There were 2315 males and 2261 females, with 493 people being aged six or younger.
