= Mirghavan =

Village in Maharashtra

- Village
- Location in Maharashtra, India Mirghavan (India)
- Country: India
- State: Maharashtra
- District: Solapur district

Languages
  - Official: Marathi
- Time zone: UTC+5:30 (IST)

Mirghavan is a village in the Karmala taluka of Solapur district in Maharashtra state, India.

== Demographics ==
Covering 995 hectares (2,460 acres) and comprising 301 households at the time of the 2011 census of India, Mirghavan had a population of 1458. There were 756 males and 702 females, with 183 people being aged six or younger.
