= Balewadi, Solapur district =

Village in Maharashtra

Coordinates: 18°11′40.5″N 75°40′52.1″E

Balewadi
- Village
- Location in Maharashtra, India Balewadi (India)
- Country: India
- State: Maharashtra
- District: Solapur district

Languages
  - Official: Marathi
- Time zone: UTC+5:30 (IST)

Balewadi is a village in the Karmala taluka of Solapur district in Maharashtra state, India.

== Demographics ==
Covering 669 hectares (1,650 acres) and comprising 214 households at the time of the 2011 census of India, Balewadi had a population of 982. There were 531 males and 451 females, with 97 people being aged six or younger.
