= Khadakewadi =

Village in Maharashtra

- Village
- Location in Maharashtra, India Khadakewadi (India)
- Country: India
- State: Maharashtra
- District: Solapur district

Languages
  - Official: Marathi
- Time zone: UTC+5:30 (IST)

Khadakewadi is a village in the Karmala taluka of Solapur district in Maharashtra state, India.

== Demographics ==
Covering 584 hectares (1,440 acres) and comprising 178 households at the time of the 2011 census of India, Khadakewadi had a population of 876. There were 444 males and 432 females, with 92 people being aged six or younger.
