= Arjunnagar =

Village in Maharashtra

- Village
- Location in Maharashtra, India Arjunnagar (India)
- Coordinates: 18°21′49″N 75°16′53″E
- Country: India
- State: Maharashtra
- District: Solapur district

Languages
  - Official: Marathi
- Time zone: UTC+5:30 (IST)

Arjunnagar is a village in the Karmala taluka of Solapur district in Maharashtra state, India.

== Demographics ==
Covering 1,061 hectares (2,620 acres) and comprising 286 households at the time of the 2011 census of India, Arjunnagar had a population of 1,371. There were 692 males and 679 females, with 191 people being aged six or younger.
