= Kondhar Chincholi =

Village in Maharashtra

- Village
- Location in Maharashtra, India Kondhar Chincholi (India)
- Country: India
- State: Maharashtra
- District: Solapur district

Languages
  - Official: Marathi
- Time zone: UTC+5:30 (IST)

Kondhar Chincholi is a village in the Karmala taluka of Solapur district in Maharashtra state, India.

== Demographics ==
Covering 1,177 hectares (2,910 acres) and comprising 281 households at the time of the 2011 census of India, Kondhar Chincholi had a population of 1387. There were 724 males and 663 females, with 155 people being aged six or younger.
