= Dilmeshwar =

Village in Maharashtra

- Village
- Location in Maharashtra, India Dilmeshwar (India)
- Country: India
- State: Maharashtra
- District: Solapur district

Languages
  - Official: Marathi
- Time zone: UTC+5:30 (IST)

Dilmeshwar is a village in the Karmala taluka of Solapur district in Maharashtra state, India.

== Demographics ==
Covering 311 hectares (770 acres) and comprising 70 households at the time of the 2011 census of India, Dilmeshwar had a population of 327. There were 173 males and 154 females, with 35 people being aged six or younger.
