= Nilaj =

Village in Maharashtra

Coordinates: 18°27′17″N 75°14′13″E

- Village
- Location in Maharashtra, India Nilaj (India)
- Country: India
- State: Maharashtra
- District: Solapur district

Languages
  - Official: Marathi
- Time zone: UTC+5:30 (IST)

Nilaj is a village in the Karmala taluka of Solapur district in Maharashtra state, India.

== Demographics ==
Covering 222 hectares (550 acres) and comprising 118 households at the time of the 2011 census of India, Nilaj had a population of 647. There were 336 males and 311 females, with 74 people being aged six or younger.
