= Vanjanwadi =

Village in Maharashtra

- village
- Location in Maharashtra, India Vanjanwadi (India)
- Country: India
- State: Maharashtra
- District: Solapur district

Languages
  - Official: Marathi
- Time zone: UTC+5:30 (IST)

Vanjanwadi is a village in the Karmala taluka of Solapur district in Maharashtra state, India.

== Demographics ==
Covering 1,153 hectares (2,850 acres) and comprising 221 households at the time of the 2011 census of India, Vanjanwadi had a population of 856. There were 431 males and 425 females, with 70 people being aged six or younger.
