= Delwadi =

Village in Maharashtra

- Village
- Location in Maharashtra, India Delwadi (India)
- Country: India
- State: Maharashtra
- District: Solapur district

Languages
  - Official: Marathi
- Time zone: UTC+5:30 (IST)

Delwadi is a village in the Karmala taluka of Solapur district in Maharashtra state, India.

== Demographics ==
Covering 1,036 hectares (2,560 acres) and comprising 218 households at the time of the 2011 census of India, Delwadi had a population of 1054. There were 555 males and 499 females, with 119 people being aged six or younger.
