= Kamone =

Village in Maharashtra

- Village
- Location in Maharashtra, India Kamone (India)
- Country: India
- State: Maharashtra
- District: Solapur district

Languages
  - Official: Marathi
- Time zone: UTC+5:30 (IST)

Kamone is a village in the Karmala taluka of Solapur district in Maharashtra state, India.

== Demographics ==
Covering 1,201 hectares (2,970 acres) and comprising 309 households at the time of the 2011 census of India, Kamone had a population of 1424. There were 738 males and 686 females, with 172 people being aged six or younger.
