= Goyegaon =

Village in Maharashtra

- Village
- Location in Maharashtra, India Goyegaon (India)
- Country: India
- State: Maharashtra
- District: Solapur district

Languages
  - Official: Marathi
- Time zone: UTC+5:30 (IST)

Goyegaon is a village in the Karmala taluka of Solapur district in Maharashtra state, India.

== Demographics ==
Covering 699 hectares (1,730 acres) and comprising 174 households at the time of the 2011 census of India, Goyegaon had a population of 842. There were 434 males and 408 females, with 80 people being aged six or younger.
