= Devichamal =

Village in Maharashtra

- Village
- Location in Maharashtra, India Devichamal (India)
- Country: India
- State: Maharashtra
- District: Solapur district

Languages
  - Official: Marathi
- Time zone: UTC+5:30 (IST)

Devichamal is a village in the Karmala taluka of Solapur district in Maharashtra state, India.

== Demographics ==
Covering 109 hectares (270 acres) and comprising 438 households at the time of the 2011 census of India, Devichamal had a population of 2034. There were 1072 males and 962 females, with 279 people being aged six or younger.
