= Pande, Solapur district =

Village in Maharashtra

Pande
- Village
- Location in Maharashtra, India Pande (India)
- Country: India
- State: Maharashtra
- District: Solapur district

Languages
  - Official: Marathi
- Time zone: UTC+5:30 (IST)

Pande is a village in the Karmala taluka of Solapur district in Maharashtra state, India.

== Demographics ==
Covering 2,821 hectares (6,970 acres) and comprising 615 households at the time of the 2011 census of India, Pande had a population of 2738. There were 1421 males and 1317 females, with 327 people being aged six or younger.
