= Hisare =

Village in Maharashtra

- Village
- Location in Maharashtra, India Hisare (India)
- Coordinates: 18.350827°N 75.254525°E
- Country: India
- State: Maharashtra
- District: Solapur district

Languages
  - Official: Marathi
- Time zone: UTC+5:30 (IST)

Hisare is a village in the Karmala taluka of Solapur district in Maharashtra state, India.

== Demographics ==
Covering 2,035 hectares (5,030 acres) and comprising 388 households at the time of the 2011 census of India, Hisare had a population of 2074. There were 1081 males and 993 females, with 286 people being aged six or younger.
