= Siddheshwar Temple, Solapur =

Temple in Maharashtra, India

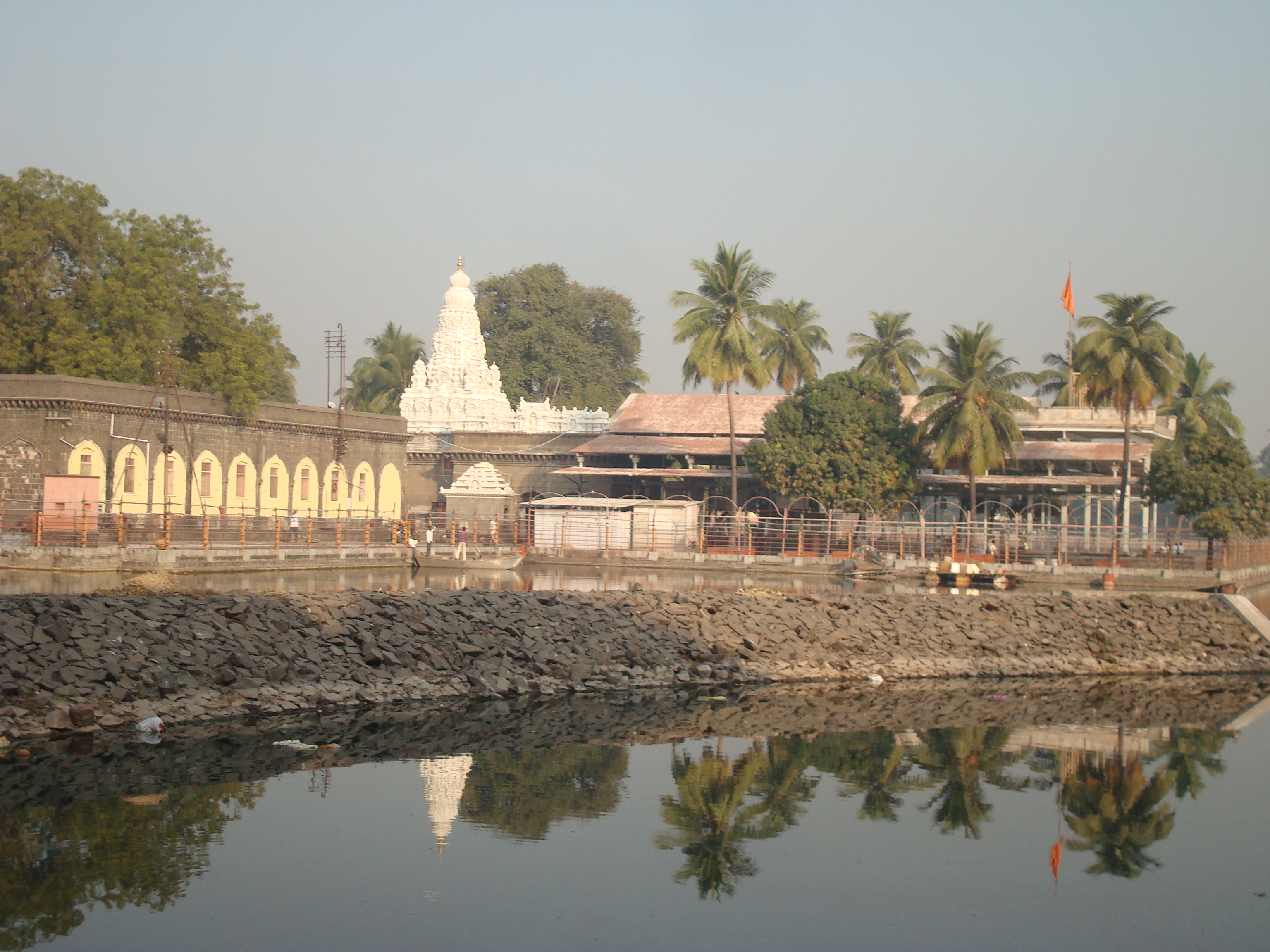
- Siddheshwar Temple

- Location within Maharashtra

Religion
- Affiliation: Hinduism
- District: Solapur district
- Deity: Parashiva

Location
- State: Maharashtra
- Country: India
- Coordinates: 17°40′22″N 75°54′16″E

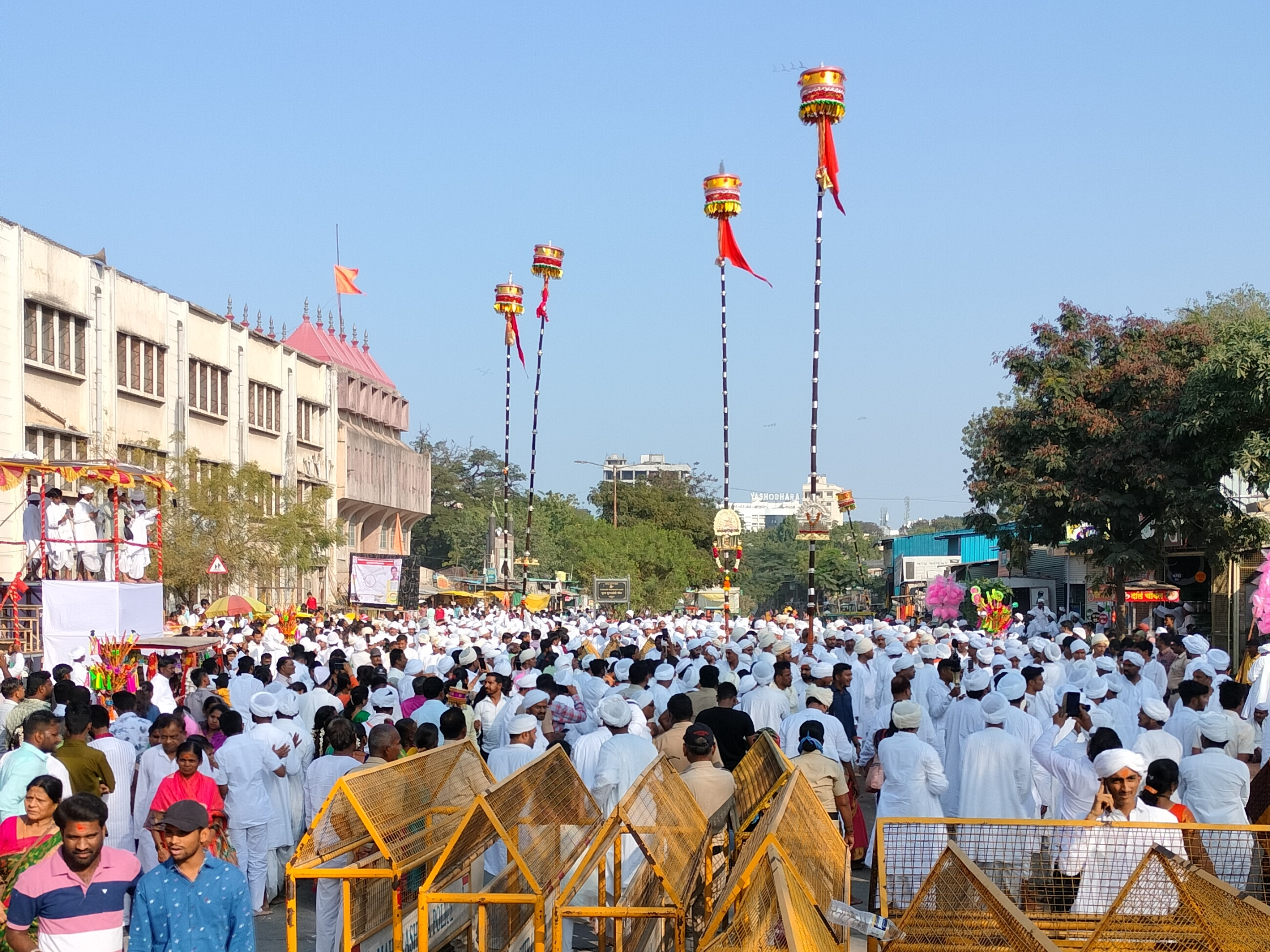
Gadda procession, January 2024

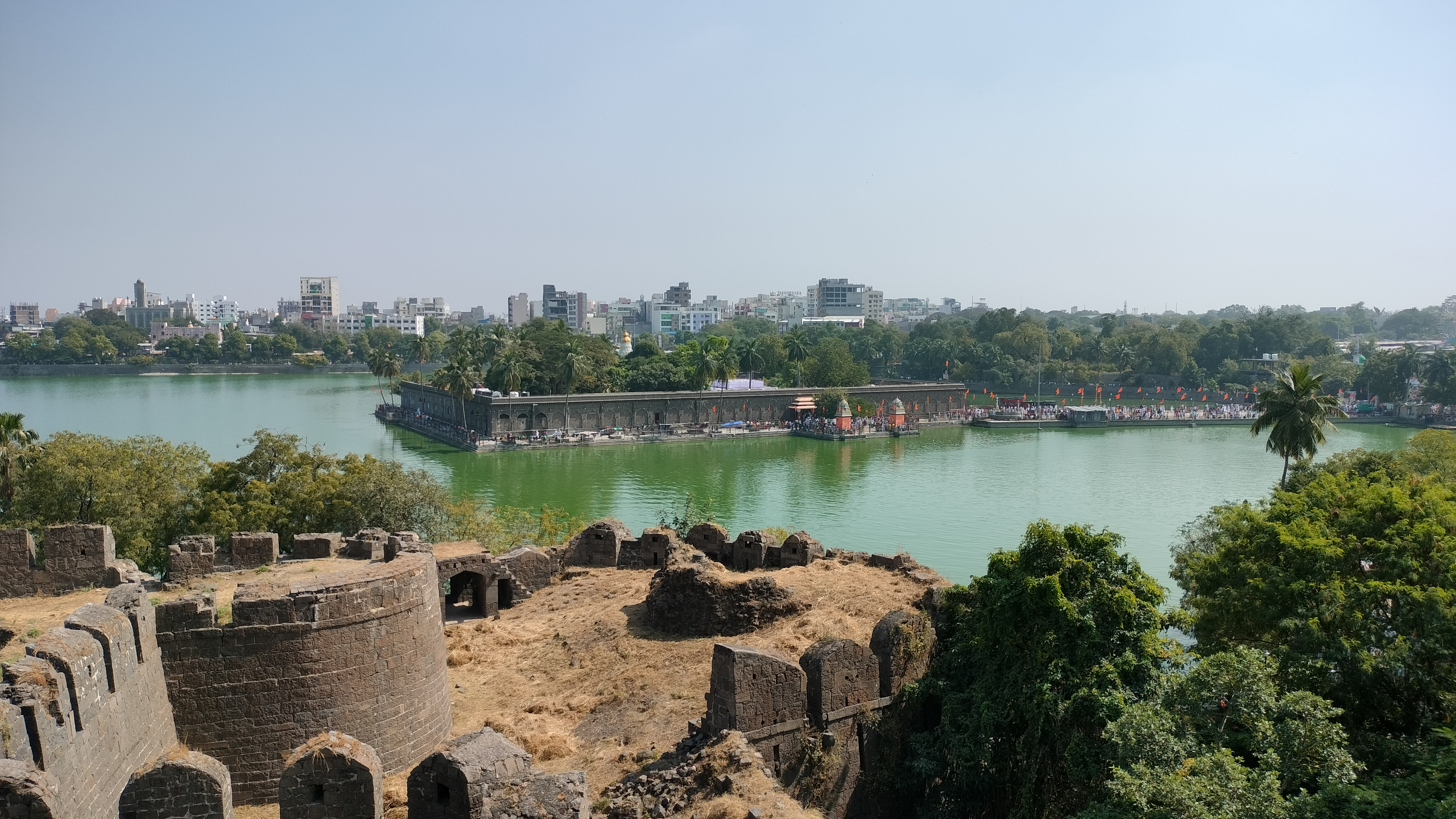
Siddheshwar Mandir, as seen from Solapur Bhuikot Killa

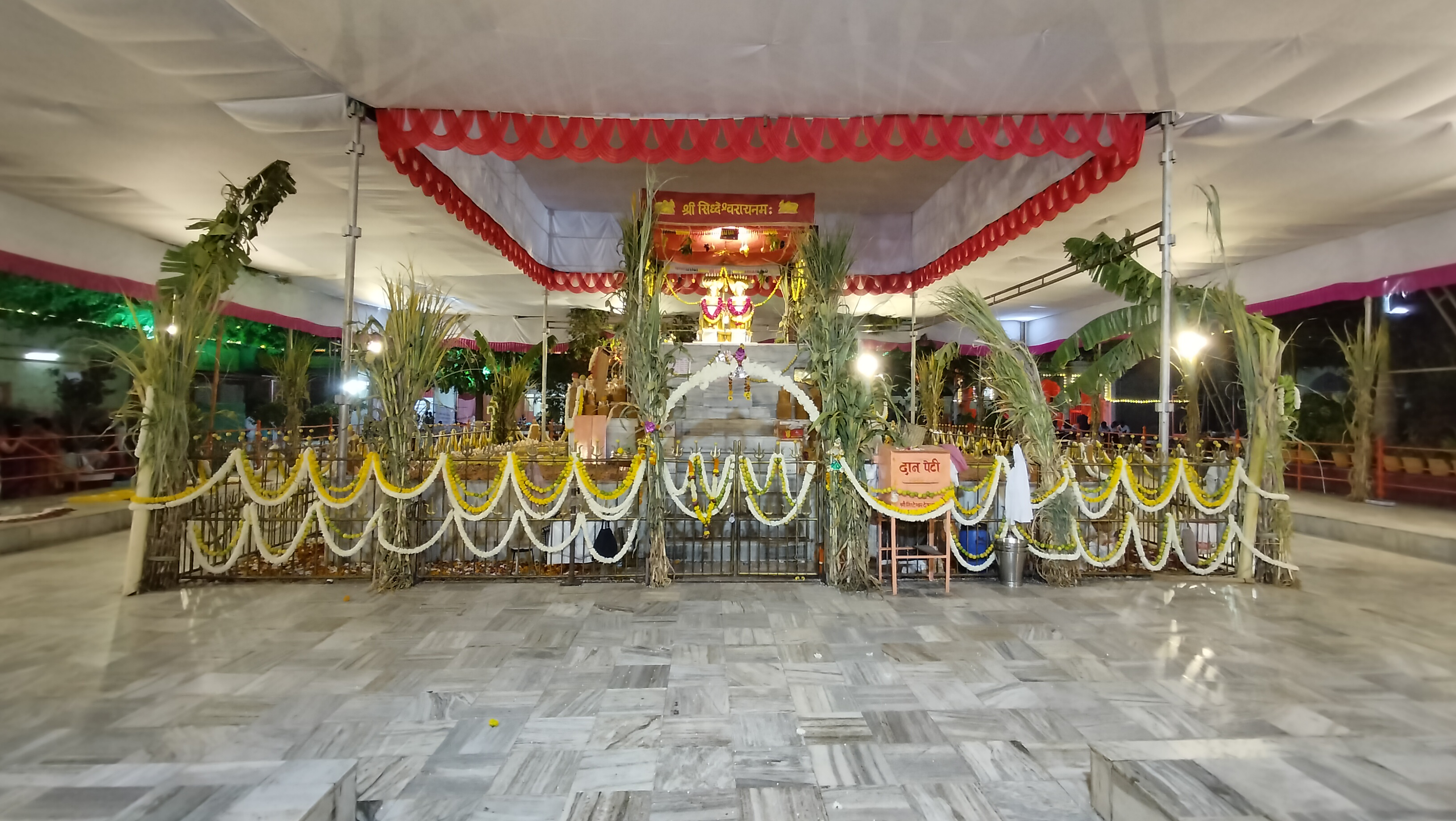
Siddheshwar samadhi

Siddheshwar Temple is a temple in Solapur district, Maharashtra, India. It is sacred to Hindus, especially the members of the Lingayat denomination. There is a lake within the temple complex.

== Temple ==
सोलापूर सिद्धेश्वर यात्रा मराठी बातम्या | Solapur Siddheshwar Yatra, Latest News & Live Updates in Marathi | Marathi News (ताज्या मराठी बातम्या) at Lokmat.com

Shri Siddheshwar Mandir is one of the most important religious and historical landmarks in Solapur, Maharashtra. It is dedicated to Shri Siddharameshwar Maharaj, a revered 12th-century saint and yogi who is regarded as the Gramdaivat (guardian deity) of Solapur city. The temple is famous for its sacred lake, spiritual atmosphere and annual Gadda Yatra.

India +1

1. Temple information Temple name: Shri Siddheshwar Mandir / Shri Siddheshwar Devasthan

Location: Siddheshwar Peth, Solapur, Maharashtra – 413001

Main deity: Shri Siddheshwar (Shri Siddharameshwar Maharaj)

Historical period: Associated with the 12th century

Special attraction: Temple surrounded by Siddheshwar Lake

Official website: shrisiddheshwar.org

Official Website +1

2. History of the temple According to the temple's history, Shri Siddharameshwar Maharaj was a saint, philosopher, Kannada poet and social reformer who spread the teachings of Shri Basaveshwara.

He is associated with the establishment of 68 Shiva Lingas in and around Solapur.

He helped create Siddheshwar Lake in the 12th century to provide water for the local community.

His samadhi is located within the temple complex.

His teachings emphasized service to society, equality and the importance of work.

The temple and lake have played an important role in Solapur's religious and cultural history for centuries.

The temple is dedicated to its namesake Siddheshwar, a twelfth-century devotee of Shiva who is considered a god in the Lingayat faith and the grāmadevatā of Solapur. It is at the temple's site where he is recorded as having attained samadhi, and as such the location is revered by devotees. Upon achieving samadhi in 1167AD, Siddeshwar attained samadhi and A marble samadhi exists at the centre of the temple today.

Siddheshwar is attributed to having installed 68 Shiva lingams in the main courtyard; the amrit (immortality) linga being one of them. There are several smaller temples within the complex, such as ones dedicated to Ganesha, Vithoba and Rukmini. Additionally, within the sanctum of the main temple complex there is an idolic effigy of Siddheshwar. A silver-plated figure of the mythological bull nandi is also present.

== History ==
As per the records, Siddheshwar Temple was built by Shri Siddharameshwar, a yogi and devotee of Shri Mallikarjuna of Srisailam. He built this temple and made 68 Shiva lingams in the temple as per the instructions of his guru. It is said that the city of Solapur began to prosper at the birth of Shri Siddheshwar, who is also considered as the fifth god of the Lingayat faith, and devotees seek the blessings of this deity.

The temple and lake have been administered since 1899 by the ‘Shri Siddheshwar Devsthan Panch Committee’.

The best time to visit the temple is the Makar Sankranti festival in mid-January, when a grand celebration takes place for three days. Gadda Yatra, a local fair, is arranged for fifteen days in the vicinity of the temple. The temple is in honour of Siddheshwar, a devotee of Shiva.

== Ritual ==
On Makarsankrat, there are annual pilgrimages called 'Gadda'. This is when the Gadda Yatra celebration begins and continues for 15 days. A procession called the 'Procession of Kathis' is conducted at the temple.

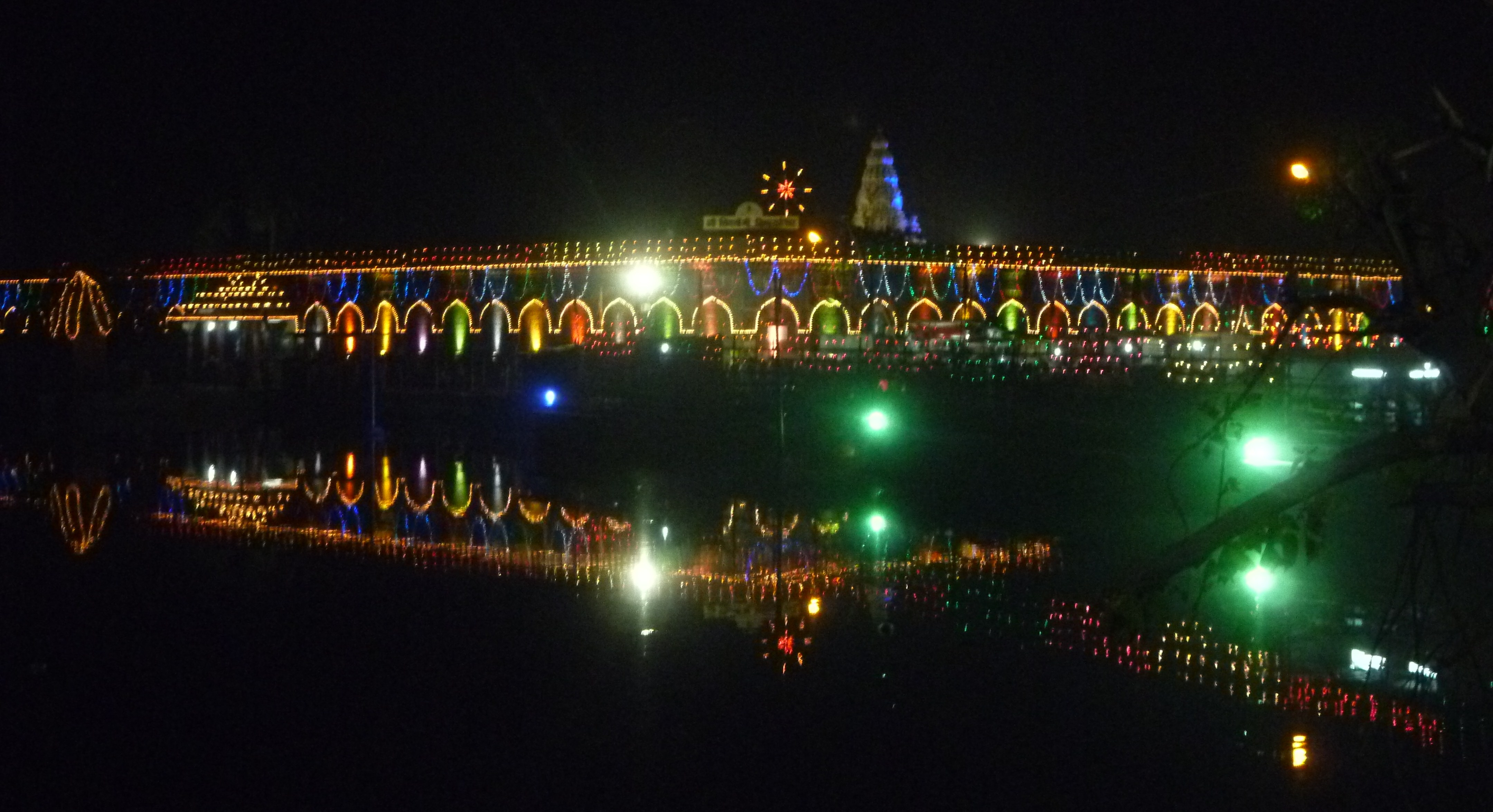
The temple during the Gadda Yatra

The temple is attended by members of Veerashaiva.
