= Mohol =

- Town/ Taluka
- Location within Maharashtra
- Coordinates: 17.8167°N 75.6667°E
- Country: India
- State: Maharashtra
- District: Solapur

Government
  - Body: Shivsena
- Elevation: 455 m (1,493 ft)

Population (2019)
  - Total: 56,836
- Demonym: Moholkar

Language
  - Official: Marathi
- Time zone: UTC+5:30 (IST)
- Postal code: 413213
- Vehicle registration: MH 13

Mohol is a taluka (town) and a municipal council in Solapur district in the Indian state of Maharashtra. It contains the Nagnath Temple, one of the most important for the Nagesh community.

== History ==
During the Muslim period, Mohol was known as 'Sonalpur'. An inscription from 1316 AD found in Kamati, Mohol taluka, confirms this.

Mohol was part of the Ahmednagar, Pune, and Satara districts before becoming a sub-district of Ahmednagar in 1838. In 1871, the district was reformed and joined with other sub-divisions to become the Solapur district.

=== Timeline ===
- 1838: Mohol became a sub-district of Ahmednagar.
- 1864: The sub-district of Sholapur, which included Mohol, was abolished.
- 1871: The Solapur district was reformed, including the sub-divisions of Mohol, Barshi, Madha, Karmala, Pandharpur, and Sangola.
- 1875: The Malshiras sub-division was added to the Solapur district.
- 1949: Mohol taluka was newly formed along with Akkalkot and Mangalwedha talukas.

== List of villages in Mohol ==
Sr. No.	Village Name	Gram Panchayat with Pin Code
1	Adhegaon	Adhegaon 413248
2	Angar	Angar 413214
3	Ankoli	Ankoli 413253
4	Arbali	Arbali 413253
5	Ardhanari	Ardhanari 413253
6	Arjunsond	Arjunsond 413214
7	Ashte	Ashte 413213
8	Ashti	Ashti 413303
9	Aundhi	Aundhi 413248
10	Bairagwadi	Bairagwadi 413221
11	Bhairowadi	Mangaoli 413221
12	Bhambewadi	Bhambewadi 413213
13	Bhoire	Bhoire 413213
14	Bitle	Bitle 413214
15	Bople	Bople 413213
16	Chikhali	Chikhali 413213
17	Chincholikati	Chincholikati 413213
18	Dadapur	Dadapur 413253
19	Degaon	Degaon 413410
20	Deodi	Deodi 413324
21	Dhaingade Wadi	Malikpeth 413214
22	Dhokbabulgaon	Dhokbabulgaon 413243
23	Diksal	Diksal 413243
24	Ekurke	Diksal 413243
25	Galandawadi	Galandwadi 412203
26	Ghatne	Ghatane 413213
27	Ghodeshwar	Ghodeshwar 413253
28	Ghorpadi	Mangaoli 413221
29	Gotewadi	Gotewadi 413213
30	Haralwadi	Haralwadi 413253
31	Hingani	Hingani Nipani 413213
32	Hivare	Hivare 413324
33	Ichgaon	Ichgaon 413253
34	Jamgaon Bk	Jamgaon Bk 413213
35	Jamgaon Kh	Jamgaon 413213
36	Kamti Bk	Kamti Bk 413253
37	Kamti Kh	Kamti Kh 413253
38	Katewadi	Katewadi 413213
39	Khandali	Khandali 413324
40	Khandobachiwadi	Khandokachiwadi 413214
41	Kharkatne	Malikpeth 413214
42	Khavani	Khavani 413248
43	Khuneshwar	Khuneshwar 413222
44	Kolegaon	Kolegaon 413213
45	Kombadwadi	Angar 413214
46	Konheri	Konheri 413248
47	Korwali	Korwali 413253
48	Kothale	Kothale 413253
49	Kuranwadi	Kuranwadi Ashti 413214
50	Kurul	Kurul 413213
51	Lamantanda	Lamantanda 413253
52	Lamboti	Lamboti 413213
53	Malikpeth	Malikpeth 413214
54	Mangaoli	Mangaoli 413221
55	Maslechaudhari	Maslechaudhari 413222
56	Miri	Miri 413221
57	Mohol	Mohol 413213
58	Morvanchi	Morvanchi 413222
59	Mundhewadi	Mundhewadi 413213
60	Najik Pimpari	Najik Pimpari 413213
61	Nalbandwadi	Nalbandwadi 413214
62	Nandgaon	Nandgaon 413213
63	Narkhed	Narkhed 413213
64	Papari	Papari 413324
65	Parmeshwar Pimpri	Parmehwar Pimpari 413213
66	Paslewadi	Diksal 413213
67	Patkul	Patkul 413248
68	Pawarwadi	Ekurke Pawarwadi 413213
69	Peertakali	Peertakali 413002
70	Penur	Penur 413248
71	Pokharapur	Pokharapur 413248
72	Pophali	Pophali 413213
73	Ramhingani	Ramhingani 413213
74	Sarole	Sarole 413213
75	Saundane	Saundane 413248
76	Sawaleshwar	Sawaleshwar 413213
77	Sayyadwarwade	Sayyadwawade 413213
78	Shejbabhulgaon	Shejbabulgaon 413213
79	Shetpal	Shetpal 413324
80	Shingoli	Shingoli 413002
81	Shirapur	Shirapur Solapur 413213
82	Siddewadi	Siddewadi 413213
83	Sohale	Sohale 413253
84	Takali	Takali Shikandar 413248
85	Tambole	Tambole 413213
86	Taratgaon	Shingoli 413002
87	Telangwadi	Telangwadi 413324
88	Wadachiwadi	Wadachiwadi 413213
89	Waddegaon	Waddegaon 413253
90	Wadwal	Wadwal 413213
91	Wafale	Wafale 413214
92	Wagholi	Wagholi 413253
93	Wagholiwadi	Wagholi 413253
94	Waluj	Waluj 413222
95	Warkute	Warkute 413248
96	Watwate	Watwate 413253
97	Wirawade Bk	Wirawade Bk 413253
98	Wirwade Kh	Wirwad Kh 413253
99	Yawali	Yawali 413248
100	Yellamwadi	Yellamwadi 413410
101	Yenaki	Yenaki 413253
102	Yeoti	Yeoti 413248

== Politics In Mohol ==
Mohol Assembly constituency (247) is one of the 288 Vidhan Sabha constituencies of Maharashtra state in western India and located in Solapur district. It is reserved for an SC Candidate.

It is a part of Solapur Lok Sabha constituency.
