= Fulchincholi =

Village in Maharashtra, India

Coordinates: 17.6911002°N 75.4843137°E

Fulchincholi is a village in Solapur district of Maharashtra, India. Pandharpur is the block for Fulchincholi village. It is located around 22 kilometres (14 mi) from Pandharpur and 50 kilometres (31 mi) from Solapur. The total geographical area of village is 1467.75 hectares. Fulchincholi has a total population of 5,648 people (according to Census 2011 information). There are about 1,188 houses in Fulchincholi village. It is a yadav pride village according to the ambabai tempal and barav (deep well) and Mahadev temple located in at. Another nearest yadav pride tempal sach that Shikhar singhanapaur Mahadev temple located away from the 50 km. And sach a temple is hemadpanthi style in 12-13th centuries example.

== About ==
- Village - Fulchincholi
- Block - Pandharpur
- District - Solapur
- State - Maharashtra
- Country - India
- Continent - Asia
- Time Zone - IST (UTC + 05:30)
- PIN Code - 413304
- Currency - Indian rupee (INR)
- Dialing Code - +91
- Date format - dd/mm/yyyy
- Driving side - left
- Internet country code top-level domain (cTLD) - .in
- Language - Marathi
- Time difference - 27 minutes
- Latitude - 17.6930912
- Longitude - 75.5005574
- Area - 1467.75 hectares

== Language ==
The native language of Fulchincholi is Marathi and all of the village people speak it

== Politics ==
NCP, INC, and BJP are the major political parties in this area.

== Connectivity ==
Type	Status
Public bus transport	Available within village
Private bus transport	Available within village
Railway	Available in Pandharpur

== Transport ==
=== Railway ===
The nearest railway station to Fulchincholi is Pandharpur which is 19.4 km away. Other railway stations include:

- Pandharpur railway station 19.4 km
- Ashti railway station 19.8 km
- Mohol railway station 22.4 km
- Bohali railway station 26.6 km
- Modnimb railway station 26.8 km

=== Airport ===
Fulchincholi's nearest airport is Boramani International Airport, 43.2 km away. Other nearby airports include:

- Boramani International Airport 43.2 km
- Solapur Airport 46.4 km
- Osmanabad Airport 87.5 km

== Geography ==
=== Nearest districts ===
Fulchincholi is 41.3 km from its district headquarters, Solapur. The other nearest district headquarters is Satara, 35.5 km away. Surrounding districts from Fulchincholi are as follows:

- Osmanabad district 77.1 km
- Bijapur district 98.5 km
- Gulbarga district 123.6 km
- Beed district 138.3 km

=== Nearby towns and cities ===
Fulchincholi's nearest city is Pandharpur, 20.4 km away. Surrounding towns include:

- Pandharpur 20.4 km
- Mangalvedhe 21.3 km
- Narkhed 29.4 km
- Sangole 42.5 km
- Solapur 49.1 km

== Schools ==
There are 7 to 8 schools in Fulchincholi, which provide schooling from junior KG to 10th class.
