= Morochi =

Village in Maharashtra

Morochi is a village in Malshiras taluka in Solapur district, Maharashtra, India. As of the 2011 Census of India, it had a population of 5,021 across 996 households. There were 2,636 males and 2,385 females. 3,204 residents were literate and 601 were aged or under.
