= National Highway 465 (India) =

National Highway in India

National Highway 465
- Map of National Highway 465 in red

Route information
- Auxiliary route of NH 65
- Length: 105.6 km (65.6 mi)

Major junctions
- West end: Mohol
- East end: Tandulwadi

Location
- Country: India
- States: Maharashtra

Highway system
- Roads in India; Expressways; National; State; Asian
← NH 65	→ NH 65

National Highway 465, commonly referred to as NH 465 is a national highway in India. It is a secondary route of primary National Highway 65. NH-465 runs in the state of Maharashtra in India.

== Route ==
NH465 connects Mohol, Kurul, Mandrup, Basavanagar, Walsang and Tandulwadi in the state of Maharashtra.

== Junctions ==
NH 65 Terminal near Mohol.
NH 166 near Kamti
NH 52 near Mandrup
NH 150 near Valsang
NH 65 Terminal near Tandulwadi.

== See also ==
- List of national highways in India
- List of national highways in India by state
