= Shetphal, Mohol =

Village in Maharashtra, India

Shetphal
- Village
- Location in Maharashtra, India Shetphal (India)
- Coordinates: 17.90°N 75.42°E
- Country: India
- State: Maharashtra
- District: Solapur district
- Taluka: Karmala

Area
  - Total: 3,089 ha (7,630 acres)

Languages
  - Official: Marathi
- Time zone: UTC+5:30 (IST)
- PIN: 413324

Shetphal is a village in the Karmala taluka of Solapur district in Maharashtra state, India. According to the 2011 Census. The location code or village code of Shetphal village is 562192. It is situated 24 km away from sub-district headquarter Mohol (tehsildar office) and 69 km away from district headquarter Solapur. As per 2009 stats, Shetphal village is also a gram panchayat. The total geographical area of village is 3089 hectares. Kurduvadi is nearest town to shetphal for all major economic activities, which is approximately 22 km away.

It is a fact well known that India is a country, where snakes are considered as revered creatures due to their ancient origin, and their connection with Hindu deity Shiva. Every year, on the Nag Panchami festival, thousands of devout people in Indian villages worship and feed the snakes to receive divine blessings. Shetpal is a village, where snakes have no restriction in their movement and none of the 2,600 plus villagers ever harm them in any way.

However, about 200 km from Pune, Maharashtra, in the Solapur district, is located another village named Shetpal.

== Census ==
=== Years 2011 ===
Shetphal is a large village located in Mohol Taluka of Solapur district, Maharashtra with total 1245 families residing. The Shetphal village has population of 5772 of which 3055 are males while 2717 are females.

In Shetphal village population of children with age 0-6 is 754 which makes up 13.06% of total population of village. Average Sex Ratio of Shetphal village is 889 which is lower than Maharashtra state average of 929. Child Sex Ratio for the Shetphal as per census is 866, lower than Maharashtra average of 894.

Shetphal village has lower literacy rate compared to Maharashtra. In 2011, literacy rate of Shetphal village was 76.88% compared to 82.34% of Maharashtra. In Shetphal Male literacy stands at 85.55% while female literacy rate was 67.17%.

As per constitution of India and Panchyati Raaj Act, Shetphal village is administrated by Sarpanch (Head of Village) who is elected representative of village.

==== Caste data ====
Schedule Caste (SC) constitutes 14.40% while Schedule Tribe (ST) were 0.29% of total population in Shetphal village.

==== Working population ====
In Shetphal village out of total population, 2683 were engaged in work activities. A total of 97.02% of workers describe their work as Main Work (Employment or Earning more than six months) while 2.98% were involved in Marginal activity providing livelihood for less than six months. Of 2683 workers engaged in Main Work, 1474 were cultivators (owner or co-owner) while 649 were Agricultural labourer.
