= Akkalkot Taluka =

Coordinates: 17.5223064°N 76.2048938°E

- Taluka
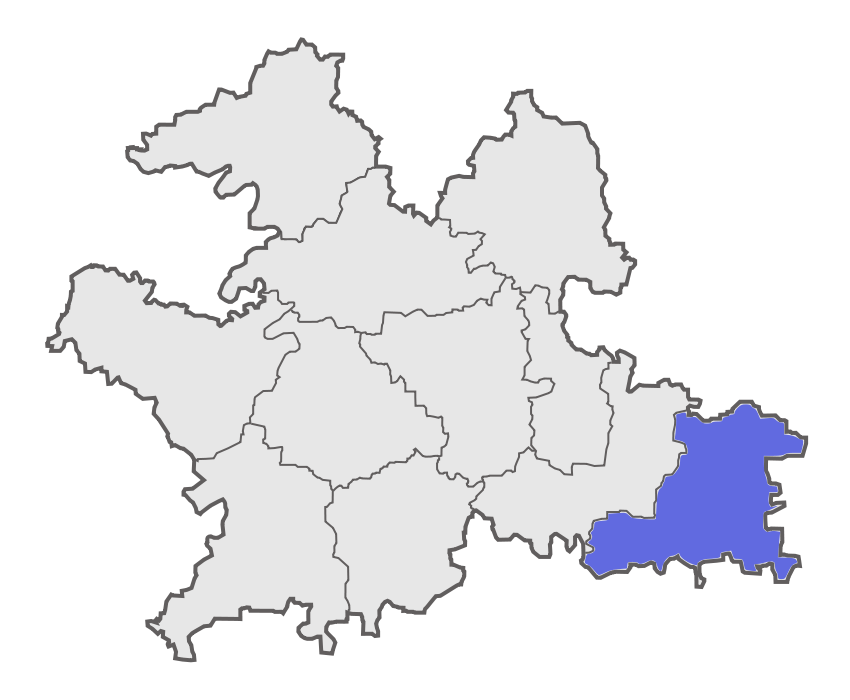
- Location of Akkalkot Taluka in Solapur District
- Country: India
- State: Maharashtra
- District: Solapur District
- Headquarters: Akkalkot

Government
  - Assistant SDM/Tahasildar: Anjali Marod

Area
  - Total: 1,390.3 km^{2} (536.8 sq mi)

Population (2011 census)
  - Total: 314,570
  - Density: 226.26/km^{2} (586.01/sq mi)
  - Sex ratio: 950
- Time zone: UTC+5:30 (IST)
- Postal code: 413216
- Villages: 138
- Revenue circles: 7
- Average rainfall: 643.6 mm

Akkalkot Taluka is one of the 11 tehsils of Solapur District in the Indian state of Maharashtra. The tehsil occupies the southeast corner of the district and is bordered by Osmanabad District to the north, Karnataka's Kalaburagi and Bijapur districts to the southeast and south respectively, and South Solapur Taluka to the west. The tehsil headquarters is located at Akkalkot, which is also the largest city in the tehsil and a religious center of the area.

== Demographics ==
As of 2011, the population of the taluka was 314,570, out of which 161,314 were male and 153,256 were female.

Languages of Akkalkot taluka (2011)
1. Kannada (54.2%)
2. Marathi (24.3%)
3. Hindi (9.01%)
4. Urdu (7.08%)
5. Lambadi (3.11%)
6. Telugu (1.39%)
7. Others (0.92%)

At the time of the 2011 census, 54.21% of the population spoke Kannada, 24.28% Marathi, 9.01% Hindi, 7.08% Urdu, 3.11% Lambadi and 1.39% Telugu as their first language.
