= North Solapur =

North Solapur Taluka
- Tehsil
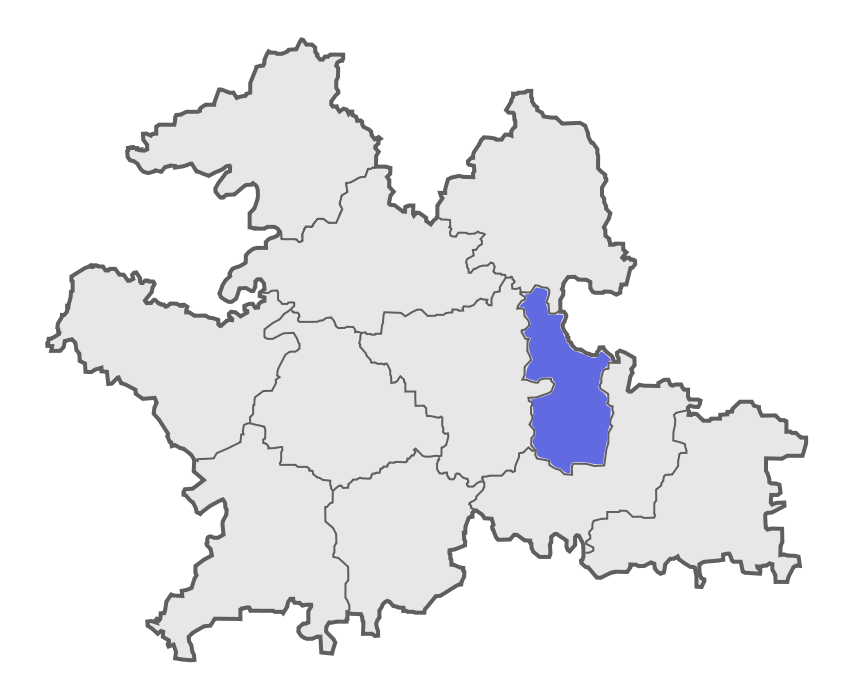
- Location of North Solapur Taluka in Solapur District
- Country: India
- State: Maharashtra
- District: Solapur District
- Headquarters: Solapur

Government
  - Tahsildar: Santosh Bhor

Area
  - Total: 711 km^{2} (275 sq mi)

Population (2001 census)
  - Total: 960,803
  - Density: 1,350/km^{2} (3,500/sq mi)
  - Sex ratio: 958
- Villages: 54
- Revenue circles: 5
- Average rainfall: 617.3 mm

North Solapur Taluka is one of the 11 tehsils of Solapur District in the Indian state of Maharashtra. This tehsil is located in the eastern side of district and is bordered by Osmanabad District to the northeast, South Solapur to the south and east, Barshi Taluka to the north and Mohol Taluka to the west. The tehsil headquarters is located at Solapur, which is also the district headquarters and its largest city.

As of 2001, the tehsil population was 960,803
