= Piliv =

Village in Maharashtra

- Village
- Location in Maharashtra, India Piliv (India)
- Coordinates: 17.678842°N 74.966412°E
- Country: India
- State: Maharashtra
- District: Solapur

Government
  - Type: Gramapanchayat
  - Body: 17
- Elevation: 577 m (1,893 ft)

Population
  - Total: 8,591

Languages
  - Official: Marathi
- Time zone: UTC+5:30 (IST)
- PIN: 413310

Piliv is a village in tehsil Malshiras in Solapur district in the state of Maharashtra, India.

== Geography ==
Piliv is located on Satara Solapur road, 44 km west of Pandharpur. Akluj is 26 km from Piliv.
