= Nandnee =

Village in Maharashtra

Nandnee Nandani
- Village
- Location in Maharashtra, India Nandnee (India)
- Coordinates: 17°27′18″N 75°50′44″E
- State: Maharashtra
- District: Solapur
- Elevation: 439 m (1,440 ft)

Population (2011)
  - Total: 1,590

Languages
  - Official: Marathi
- Time zone: UTC+5:30 (IST)

Nandnee, also spelleda as Nandani, is a village in the Solapur district in Pune division of Desh region of Maharashtra state in India.

== Demographics ==
According to the 2011 census Nandani total population is 1,590, of which 801 are males while 789 are females. Population of children with age 0-6 is 223 which makes up 14.03% of total population. Literacy rate of Nandani village was 67.96% compared to 82.34% of Maharashtra. In Nandani Male literacy stands at 81.42% while female literacy rate was 54.28%.

== Transport ==
Nandnee is located on National Highway 52 which connects Sangrur in Punjab to Ankola in Karnataka.
