= Dilip Gangadhar Sopal =

Indian politician

Adv. Dilip Sopal

Member of the Maharashtra Legislative Assembly
- Incumbent
- Assumed office (1985-1990), (1990-1995), (1995-1999), (1999-2004), (2009-2014), (2014-2019), (2024-Present)
- Constituency: Barshi

Government of Maharashtra Cabinet Minister of Water Supply and Sanitation
- In office 11 June 2013 – 26 September 2014
- Preceded by: Chhagan Bhujbal
- Succeeded by: Devendra Fadnavis

Personal details
- Born: 16 December 1946 (age 79)
- Party: Shiv Sena (UBT) (2019-Present)
- Other political affiliations: Indian National Congress (Till 2019)
- Occupation: Politician

Adv. Dilip Gangadharrao Sopal is a Shiv Sena politician from Solapur district. He was a member of Maharashtra Legislative Assembly, representing Barshi Vidhan Sabha constituency from 2009 to 2019. He again won from Barshi in the 2024 Maharashtra Legislative Assembly election.

== Positions held ==
- 1985: Elected as Member of Maharashtra Legislative Assembly (1st term)
- 1990: Elected as Member of Maharashtra Legislative Assembly (2nd term)
- 1995: Elected as Member of Maharashtra Legislative Assembly (3rd term)
- 1995: Appointed Minister of State for Law and Judiciary in Government of Maharashtra
- 1999: Elected as Member of Maharashtra Legislative Assembly (4th term)
- 2009: Elected as Member of Maharashtra Legislative Assembly (5th term)
- 2013: Appointed Cabinet Minister for Water Supply & Sanitation in Government of Maharashtra
- 2014: Elected as Member of Maharashtra Legislative Assembly (6th term)
- 2024: Elected as Member of Maharashtra Legislative Assembly (7th term)
