= Khadaki, Solapur district =

Village in Maharashtra

Khadaki
- village
- Location in Maharashtra, India Khadaki (India)
- Country: India
- State: Maharashtra
- District: Solapur district

Languages
  - Official: Marathi
- Time zone: UTC+5:30 (IST)

Khadaki is a village in the Karmala taluka of Solapur district in Maharashtra state, India.

== Demographics ==
Covering 1,581 hectares (3,910 acres) and comprising 396 households at the time of the 2011 census of India, Khadaki had a population of 1864. There were 984 males and 880 females, with 245 people being aged six or younger.
