= Khadaki, Palghar district =

Village in Maharashtra

Khadaki
- village
- Location in Maharashtra, India Khadaki (India)
- Coordinates: 19.8760053°N 73.0228173°E
- Country: India
- State: Maharashtra
- District: Palghar
- Taluka: Vikramgad
- Elevation: 103 m (338 ft)

Population (2011)
  - Total: 2,424
- Time zone: UTC+5:30 (IST)
- 2011 census code: 551758

Khadaki is a village in the Palghar district of Maharashtra, India. It is located in the Vikramgad taluka.

== Demographics ==
According to the 2011 census of India, Khadaki has 422 households. The effective literacy rate (i.e. the literacy rate of population excluding children aged 6 and below) is 53.94%.

Demographics (2011 Census)
	Total	Male	Female
Population	2424	1197	1227
Children aged below 6 years	446	231	215
Scheduled caste	0	0	0
Scheduled tribe	2373	1170	1203
Literates	1067	635	432
Workers (all)	1356	690	666
Main workers (total)	1275	656	619
Main workers: Cultivators	1015	515	500
Main workers: Agricultural labourers	186	94	92
Main workers: Household industry workers	29	18	11
Main workers: Other	45	29	16
Marginal workers (total)	81	34	47
Marginal workers: Cultivators	20	9	11
Marginal workers: Agricultural labourers	51	23	28
Marginal workers: Household industry workers	2	1	1
Marginal workers: Others	8	1	7
Non-workers	1068	507	561
