= Solapur South =

Solapur South Taluka
- Tehsil
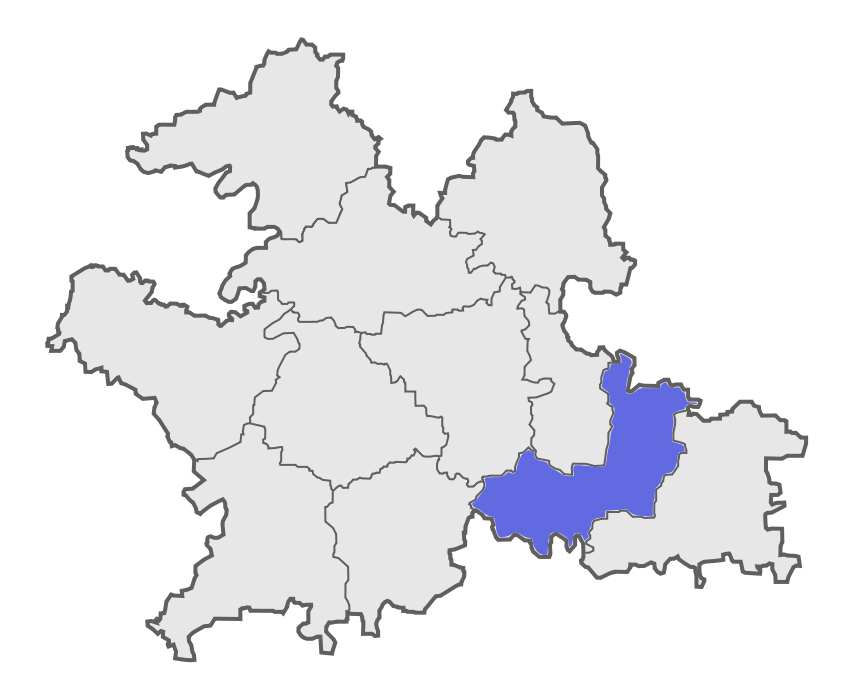
- Location of South Solapur Taluka in Solapur District
- Country: India
- State: Maharashtra
- District: Solapur District
- Headquarters: Solapur

Government
  - Tahsildar: Shripati More

Area
  - Total: 1,195.3 km^{2} (461.5 sq mi)

Population (2011)
  - Total: 260,897
  - Density: 218.27/km^{2} (565.31/sq mi)
  - Sex ratio: 944
- Villages: 90
- Revenue circles: -
- Average rainfall: 617.3 mm

Solapur South Taluka is one of the 11 tehsils of Solapur District in the Indian state of Maharashtra. This tehsil is located in the southeastern side of district and is bordered by Osmanabad District to the northeast, North Solapur and Mohol Taluka to the north, Akkalkot Taluka to the southeast, Karnataka's Kalaburagi district to the south, and Mangalvedhe Taluka to the west. The tehsil headquarters is located at Solapur, which is also the district headquarters and its largest city. Mandrup, Kumbhari, Valasang, Musti and Boramani are the biggest villages in south Solapur.

== Demographics ==
Religions in Solapur South taluka (2011)
Religion	Percent
Hinduism	85.24%
Islam	13.81%
Buddhism	0.55%
Other or not stated	0.40%

At the time of the 2011 census, the taluka had a population of 260,897, entirely rural. Solapur South had a sex ratio of 944 females per 1000 males and a literacy rate of 73.42% for the population 7 years and above. 13.35% of the population is under 6 years of age. Scheduled Castes and Scheduled Tribes make up 13.47% and 4.52% of the population respectively.

Languages of Solapur South taluka (2011)
1. Marathi (37.6%)
2. Kannada (35.7%)
3. Hindi (9.26%)
4. Lambadi (5.46%)
5. Telugu (5.12%)
6. Urdu (4.88%)
7. Others (1.98%)

At the time of the 2011 Census of India, 37.61% of the population in the taluka spoke Marathi, 35.69% Kannada, 9.26% Hindi, 5.46% Lambadi, 5.12% Telugu and 4.88% Urdu as their first language.
