= Barshi taluka =

Barshi taluka बार्शी तालुका
- Tehsil
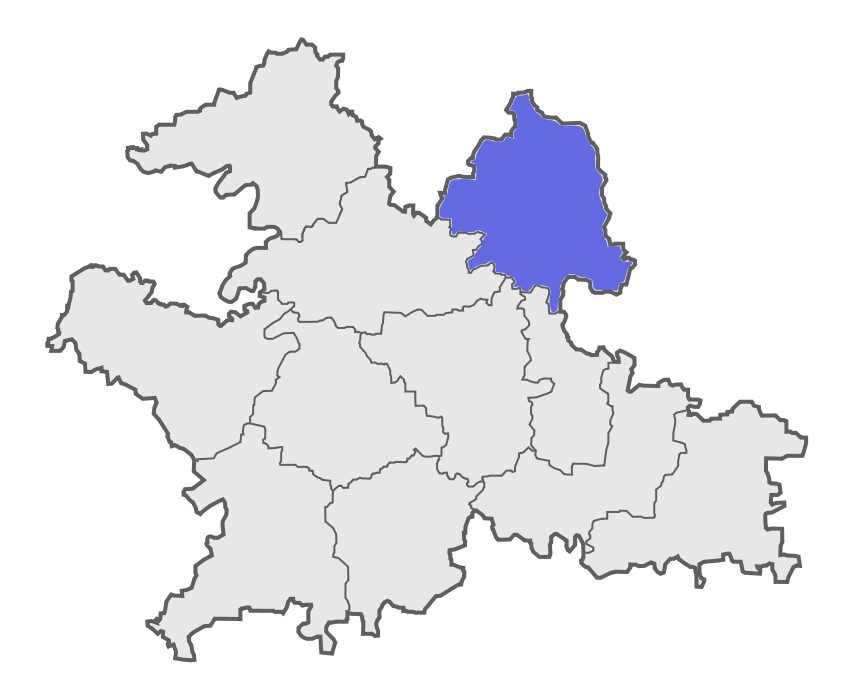
- Location of Barshi Taluka in Solapur District
- Country: India
- State: Maharashtra
- District: Solapur District
- Headquarters: Barshi

Government
  - Tahsildar: B. R. Mali

Area
  - Total: 1,433.1 km^{2} (553.3 sq mi)

Population (2011 census)
  - Total: 372,711
  - Density: 260.07/km^{2} (673.59/sq mi)
  - Sex ratio: 929
- Villages: 150
- Revenue circles: 9
- Average rainfall: 594.8 mm

Barshi Taluka (Marathi: बार्शी तालुका) is one of the 11 talukas of Solapur District in the Indian state of Maharashtra. This tehsil occupies the Northeast corner of the district and is bordered by Osmanabad District to the north and east, Madha Taluka to the west, Mohol Taluka to the southwest and North Solapur Taluka to the south. The tehsil headquarters is located at Barshi, which is also the largest city in the tehsil.

== Demographics ==
Religions in Barshi taluka (2011)
Religion	Percent
Hinduism	89.27%
Islam	9.16%
Jainism	0.89%
Other or not stated	0.68%

At the time of the 2011 census, Barshi taluk had 79,969 households and a population of 372,711, of which 31.85% live in urban areas. Barshi had a sex ratio of 923 females per 1000 males and a literacy rate of 78.93% for the population 7 years and above. 11.53% of the population was under 6 years of age. Scheduled Castes and Scheduled Tribes made up 13.58% and 1.28% of the population, respectively.

Languages of Barshi taluka (2011)
1. Marathi (88.5%)
2. Hindi (5.88%)
3. Urdu (2.70%)
4. Others (2.87%)

At the time of the 2011 Census of India, 88.55% of the population in the taluka spoke Marathi, 5.88% Hindi and 2.70% Urdu as their first language.
