= Karmala Taluka =

Karmala
- Taluka
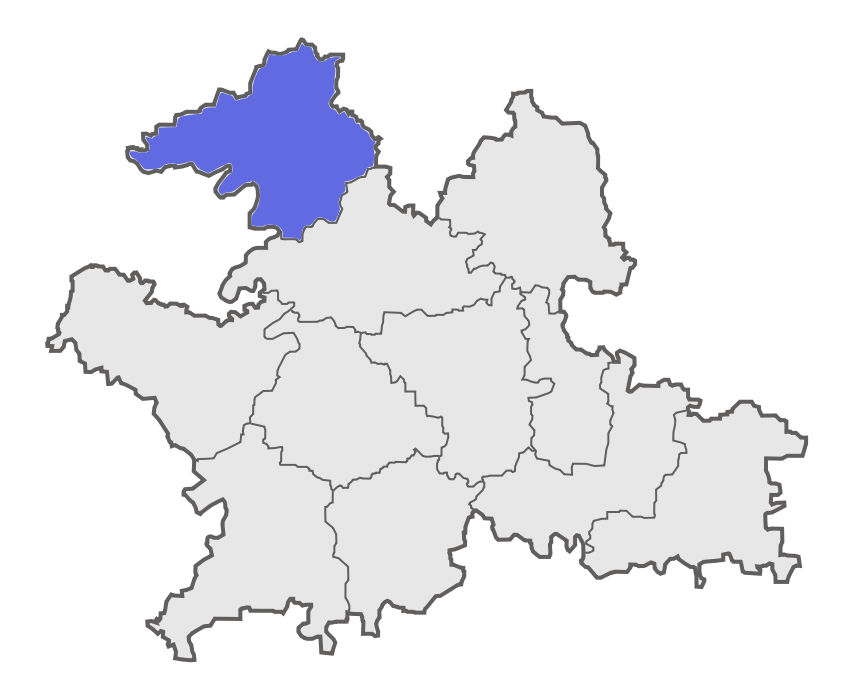
- Country: India
- State: Maharashtra
- District: Solapur District
- Headquarters: Karmala

Area
  - Total: 1,609.7 km^{2} (621.5 sq mi)

Population (2011)
  - Total: 254,489
  - Density: 158.10/km^{2} (409.47/sq mi)
  - Sex ratio: 925
- ISO 3166 code: IN-MH
- Villages: 122
- Revenue circles: 6
- Average rainfall: 50.6 mm

Karmala Taluka is one of the 11 talukas of Solapur district in the Indian state of Maharashtra. Parts of the movie Sairat were shot in this taluka. Its headquarters are in the town of Karmala.

== Demographic ==
Religions in Karmala taluka (2011)
Religion	Percent
Hinduism	93.44%
Islam	5.20%
Jainism	0.76%
Other or not stated	0.60%

Languages of Karmala taluka (2011)
1. Marathi (92.6%)
2. Hindi (4.23%)
3. Others (3.21%)

At the time of the 2011 census, the taluka had a population of 254,489. Karmala taluka had a sex ratio of 918 females per 1000 males and a literacy rate of 75.52% for the population 7 years and above. 12.20% of the population is under 6 years of age. 23,199 (9.12%) live in urban areas. Scheduled Castes and Scheduled Tribes make up 13.84% and 1.70% of the population respectively.

At the time of the 2011 Census of India, 92.56% of the population in the taluka spoke Marathi and 4.23% Hindi as their first language.

== Villages ==
- Aljapur
- Alsunde
- Anjandoh
- Arjunnagar
- Awati
- Balewadi
- Bhagatwadi
- Bhalewadi
- Bhilarwadi
- Delwadi
- Devichamal
- Dhaykhindi
- Dilmeshwar
- Divegavan
- Gaundare
- Gharatwadi
- Gorewadi
- Goyegaon
- Gulmarwadi
- Gulsadi
- Hilvare
- Hingani
- Hisare
- Hiwarwadi
- Hulgewadi
- Jategaon
- Jehunwadi
- Kawalwadi
- Kamone
- Karanje
- Khadakewadi
- Khadaki
- Khambewadi
- Ketur
- Kondhar Chincholi
- Kondhej
- Kugaon
- Kumbhej
- Kuskarwadi
- Lavhe
- Limbewadi
- Manjargaon
- Mirghavan
- Nerle
- Nilaj
- Nimgaon (H)
- Pande
- Parewadi
- Phisare
- Pomalwadi
- Pondhvadi
- Pophalaj
- Potegaon
- Pothare
- Ravgaon
- Ritewadi
- Roshewadi
- Sade
- Sarapdoh
- Shelgaon
- Sogaon
- Sounde
- Taratgaon
- Umrad
- Vanjanwadi
- Vihal
- Wadgaon Kh
- North Wadgaon
- Warkatne
- Washibe
