= Solapur district =

- District of Maharashtra
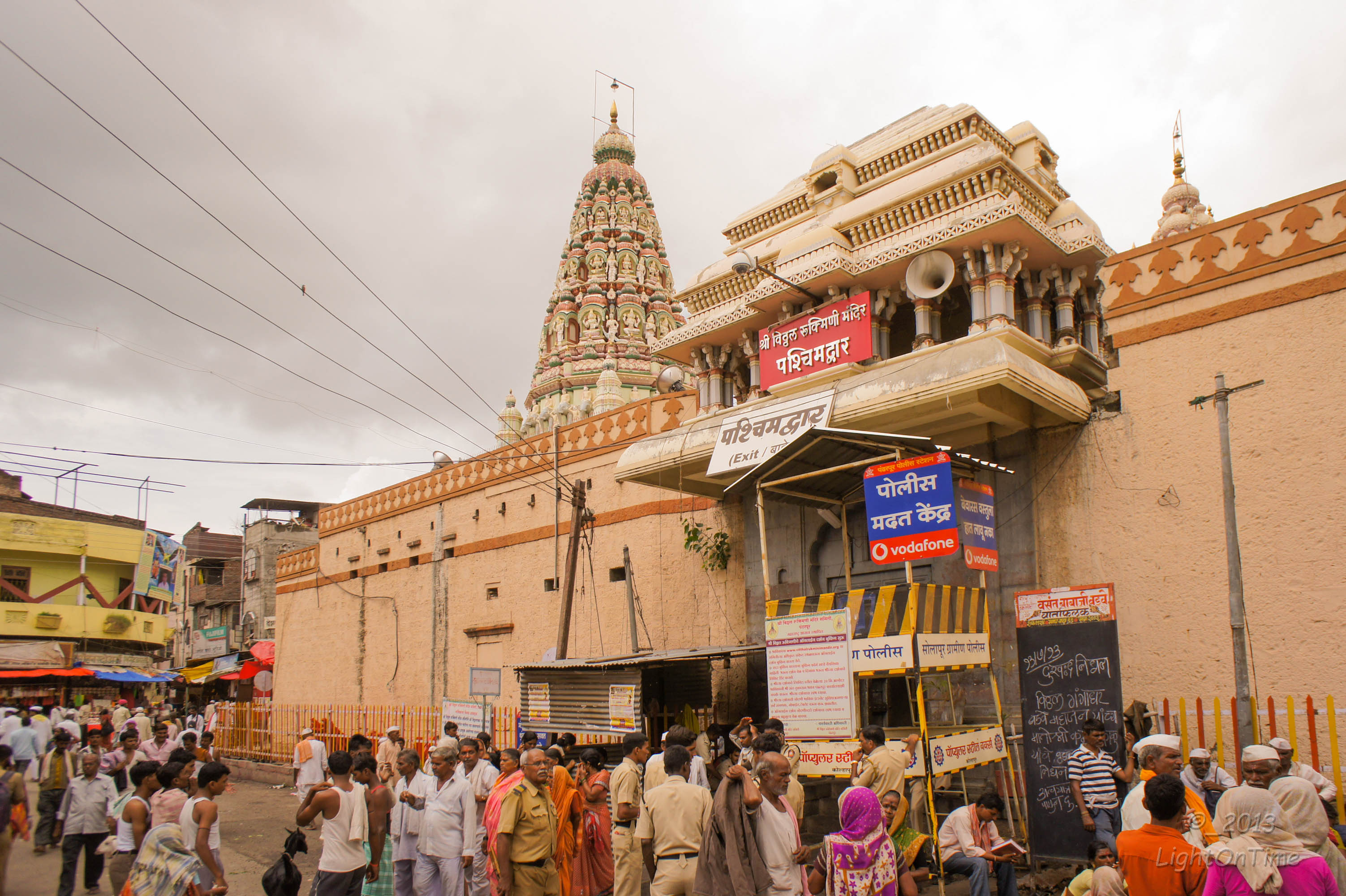
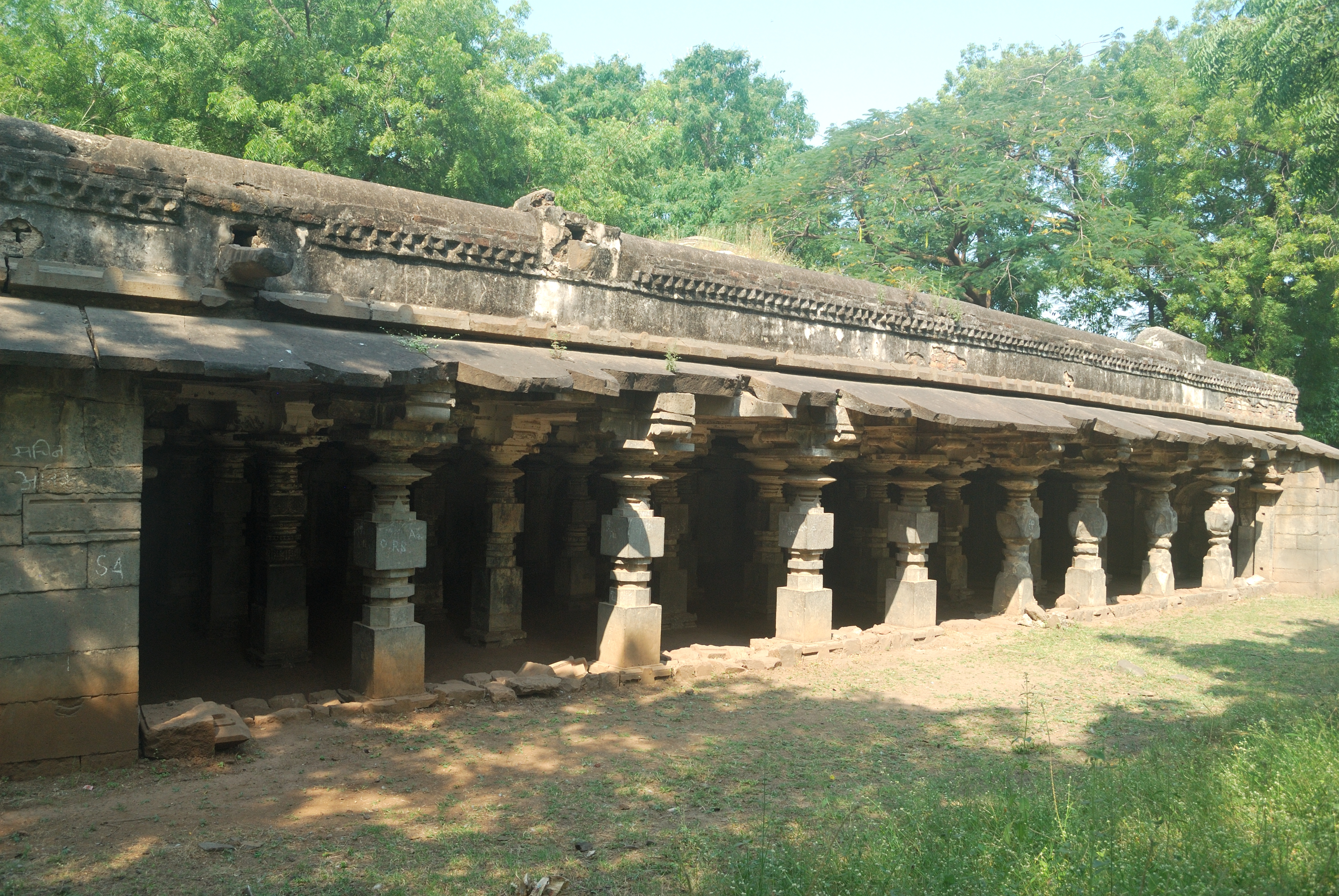
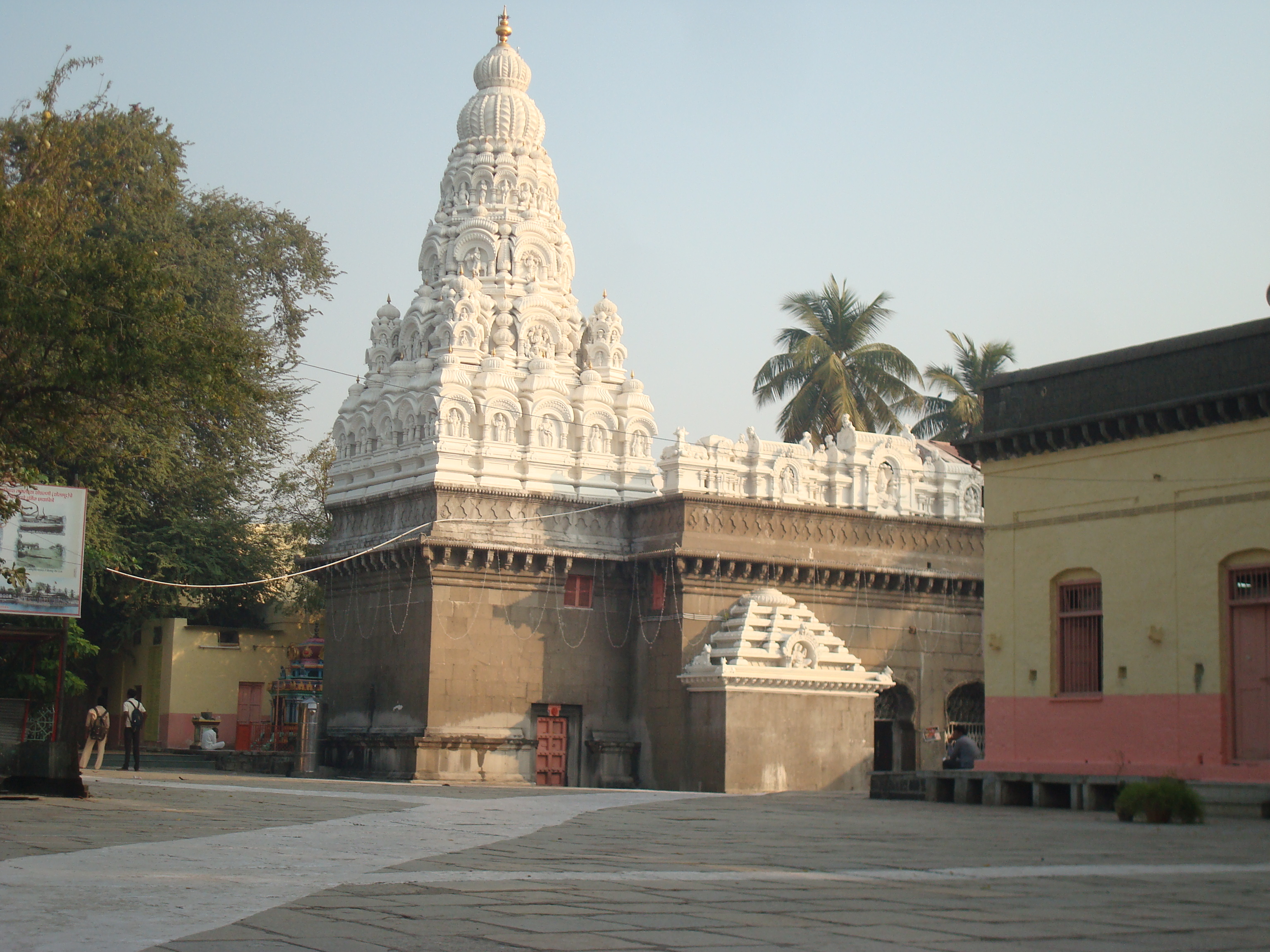
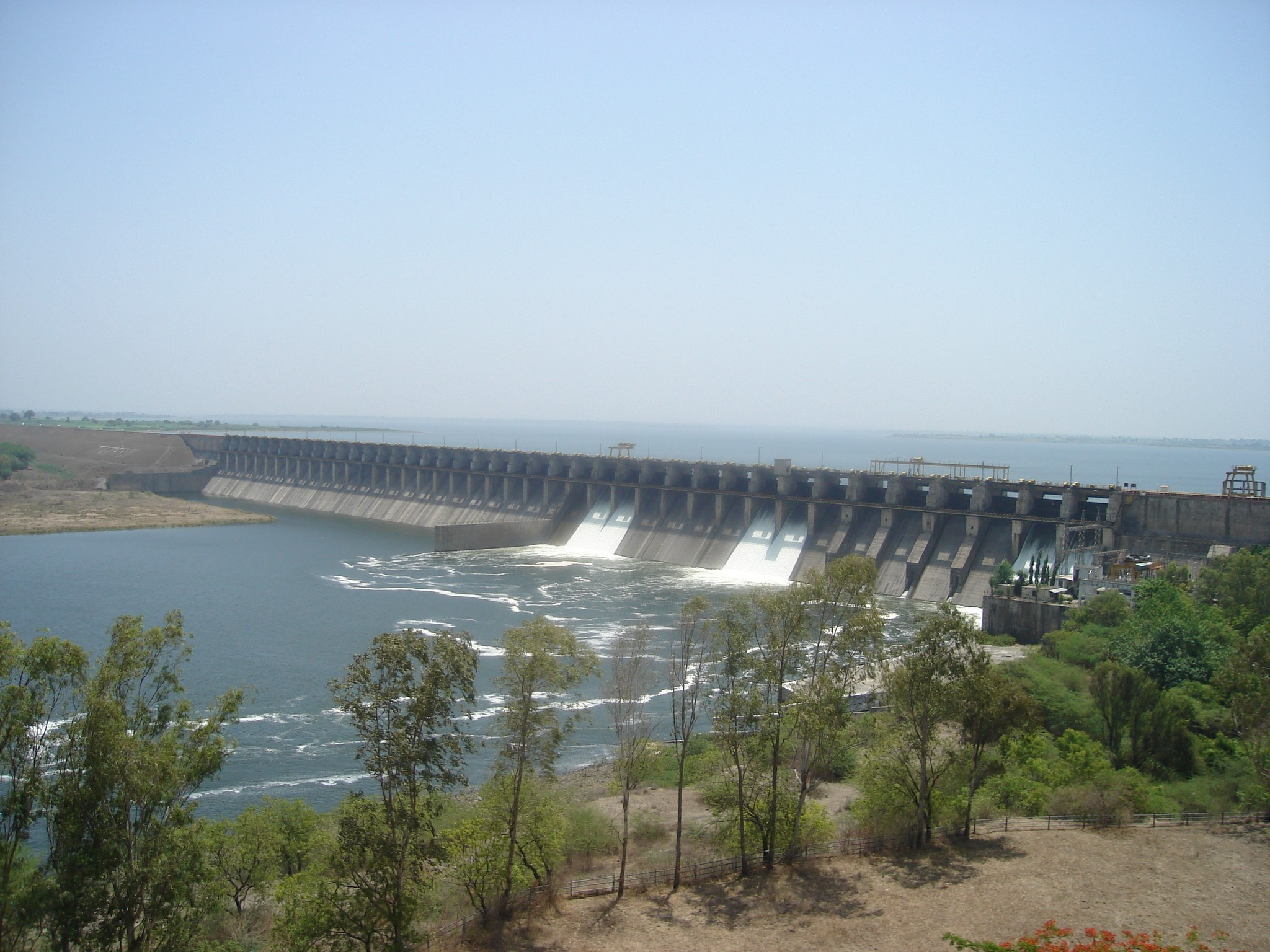
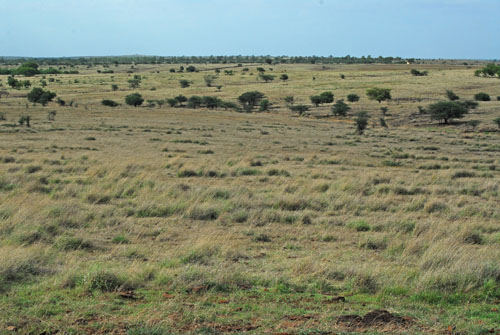
- Clockwise from top-left: Vithoba Temple in Pandharpur, Solapur Fort, Ujjani Dam, Grasslands at Nannaj Bustard Sanctuary, Siddeshwar Temple, Solapur

- Location in Maharashtra
- Coordinates (Solapur): 17°50′N 75°30′E
- Country: India
- State: Maharashtra
- Division: Pune Division‌‌‌
- Headquarters: Solapur
- Tehsils: 1. Akkalkot, 2. Barshi, 3. Karmala, 4. Madha, 5. Malshiras, 6. Mangalwedha, 7. Mohol, 8. Pandharpur, 9. Sangola, 10. North Solapur and 11. South Solapur

Government
  - Body: Solapur Zilla Parishad
  - Guardian Minister: Jaykumar Gore (Cabinet Minister)
  - District Magistrate & Collector: Karthikeyan S.
  - MPs: Praniti Sushilkumar Shinde (Solapur); Dhairyasheel Patil (Madha); Omprakash Rajenimbalkar (Dharashiv)

Area
  - Total: 14,895 km^{2} (5,751 sq mi)

Population (2011)
  - Total: 4,317,756
  - Density: 289.88/km^{2} (750.78/sq mi)
  - Urban: 31.83%

Demographics
  - Literacy: 71.2%
  - Sex ratio: 935
- Time zone: UTC+05:30 (IST)
- Vehicle registration: MH13 Solapur MH45 Akluj (Solapur Rural)
- Website: http://solapur.gov.in/

Solapur District Council

Leadership
- President: Deepak Vaidya, BJP
- Vice President: Indrajit Pawar, BJP
- CEO: Kushal Jain, IAS

Structure
- Seats: 68
- Political groups: Government (38); BJP (38) Opposition (30); SHS (08); NCP (11); NCPSP (05); PWP (03); KSA (02); TVA (01)
- Committees: Women and Child Welfare Committee; Sports Committee
- Length of term: 5 years

Solapur district (Marathi pronunciation: [solaːpuːɾ]) is a district in Maharashtra state of India. The city of Solapur is the district headquarters. It is located on the south east edge of the state and lies entirely in the Bhima and Seena basins. The entire district is drained by the Bhima River.

Solapur district leads Maharashtra in the production of Indian cigarettes known as beedi.

== Guardian Minister ==
Guardian Minister
- पालकमंत्री
- Emblem of India
- Style: The Honourable
- Appointer: Chief Minister of Maharashtra
- Term length: 5 years / No time limit
- Website: http://http:

== History ==
=== Ancient period ===
In ancient times, the northern part of the district was part of Asmaka while the southern part of the district, along with Satara and Sangli districts, was part of the region of Manadesha, part of the larger region of Kuntala. Kuntala became part of the Mauryan Empire during the time of Ashoka. After the fall of the Mauryans, Kuntala came under the Sathavahanas. Solapur lay near the Sathavahana heartland, and so remained under their rule while the rest of their empire became conquered by outside powers. The region must have had a high level of prosperity at the time, as it lay at the centre of multiple trade routes. In c. 250 CE, the Sathavahanas were overthrown by the Abhiras, whose empire later broke apart.

A dynasty calling itself the Rashtrakutas, whose first ancestor ruled in around 350CE, had their base at Manapura in modern Satara district. Their core territory was the Kuntala region, and they often harassed the Vakatakas in Vidarbha. A work ascribed to Kalidasa mentions how the Gupta ruler Vikramaditya sent him as ambassador to the Kuntala king, who eventually warmed up to him. Kalidasa says how he made peace between the Vakatakas and the Rashtrakutas, but was scathing of the lord of Kuntala's neglect of statecraft. Around the 5th century CE, an inscription records an invasion of Kuntala by the Vakatakas and that the lord of Kuntala was made into a feudatory of theirs.

Around the turn of the 6th century CE, the Vakatakas were defeated. A tradition recorded around 125 years later claims the last Vakataka king was given wholly over to pleasures and neglected his kingdom, encouraged by a son of his feudatory in Asmaka. When the kingdom was sufficiently weakened, the ruler of Asmaka invited the Kadambas to invade. In the battle between Kadambas and Vakatakas, the rulers of Asmaka and Kuntala betrayed their overlord and helped the Kadambas win the battle. Afterwards the ruler of Asmaka took over Vidarbha as well as Kuntala, but he was soon overthrown by the Vishnukundins. The Vishnukundins may have briefly controlled Kuntala for a time, but after their overthrow the Rashtrakutas declared independence. The Chalukyas under Pulakeshin II soon ousted the Rashtrakutas and took over Kuntala.

The Chalukyas continued to rule over present Solpaur until the rise of the Rashtrakutas under Dantidurga. The dynasty continued its rule over southern Maharashtra until the middle of the 10th century, when it collapsed quickly. Taila II, the Chalukya mahasamanta of the Rashtrakutas, captured Manyakheta from the last Rashtrakuta king Karka III and took over most of present Maharashtra and northern Karnataka. His descendants of the Western Chalukyas continued dominance until the middle of the 12th century. Several of their feudatories, such as the Kalachuris of Kalyani and Hoysalas, began revolts. During Kalachuri rule Lingayat thought began to spread throughout north Karnataka and southern Maharashtra, including Solapur.

At the same time that the Kalachuris overthrew the Western Chalukyas, one of their other feudatories, the Seunas, also called Yadavas, from Khandesh, declared independence. The Yadavas under Bhillama V, conquered all territory north of the Krishna including all of present Solapur district. Eventually the Yadavas defeated the Hoysalas and took all territory north of the Bhadra. Several grants were made to Yogeshwara during the reigns of some Yadava rulers. The Yadava rulers and their ministers made many contributions to the Pandharpur temple which is situated in the district.

=== Medieval period ===
At the end of the 13th century, the Delhi Sultanate under Alauddin Khilji first invaded the Yadava kingdom and the king, Ramachandra (also known as Ramdev), was reduced to a tributary and was forced to cede some territory to the sultans. In 1307, due to Ramdev's violation of the treaty, Alauddin invaded again and sent Ramdev as a captive to Delhi. After 6 months he was released and aided Malik Kafur in his attack on the Kakatiyas with a force of Maratha soldiers. In 1311, Malik Kafur was sent to conquer territory south of the Krishna but left portion of his army in Devagiri to keep an eye on Shankardev, who succeeded Ramdev. In 1313, Malik Kafur invaded Devagiri again and killed Shankardev and annexed the entire Yadava kingdom to the Delhi Sultanate. However, he returned to Delhi on hearing news of Alauddin's illness and Harpaldev, Ramdev's son-in-law, took back the entire empire.

In 1317 Alauddin's successor, Qutbuddin Mubarak Shah led an expedition against the Yadavas. Harpaldev was flayed alive and beheaded and the entire Yadava kingdom was permanently annexed by the Delhi Sultanate. Solapur was then ruled from Devagiri by a governor.

During the reign of Muhammad Bin Tughlaq, who tried to shift the capital of his empire to Devagiri (renamed Daulatabad), there was a large famine in the region. In 1344, an uprising of Hindu chieftains of Karnataka and Telangana briefly overthrew Sultanate rule in the region, although Delhi sultans kept control over some of the revenue centres. In 1347, Muslim nobles in the Deccan rebelled against Muhammad bin Tughlaq's authority and defeated all attempts to control them. The rebels then declared one of their number, Hasan Gangu, as sultan of all territories in the Deccan, which began the rule of the Bahmani Sultanate.

== Demographics ==
Historical population
Year	Pop.	±% p.a.
1901	875,368	—
1911	946,761	+0.79%
1921	900,267	−0.50%
1931	1,058,959	+1.64%
1941	1,215,953	+1.39%
1951	1,490,446	+2.06%
1961	1,843,102	+2.15%
1971	2,233,369	+1.94%
1981	2,588,139	+1.49%
1991	3,231,057	+2.24%
2001	3,849,543	+1.77%
2011	4,317,756	+1.15%

Religions in Solapur district (2011)
Religion	Percent
Hinduism	87.90%
Islam	10.22%
Buddhism	0.82%
Jainism	0.65%
Other or not stated	0.41%

According to the 2011 census Solapur District has a population of 4,317,756, the 43rd largest district in India by population (out of 640). The district has a population density of 290 inhabitants per square kilometre (750/sq mi). Its population growth rate over the decade 2001-2011 was 12.1%. Solapur has a sex ratio of 932 females for every 1000 males, and a literacy rate of 77.72%. 32.40% of the population lived in urban areas. Scheduled Castes and Scheduled Tribes make up 15.05% and 1.80% of the population respectively.

Languages of Solapur district (2011)
1. Marathi (73.1%)
2. Kannada (9.28%)
3. Hindi (6.47%)
4. Telugu (4.49%)
5. Urdu (3.94%)
6. Lambadi (0.94%)
7. Others (1.75%)

At the time of the 2011 Census of India, 73.13% of the population in the district spoke Marathi, 9.28% Kannada, 6.47% Hindi, 4.49% Telugu, 3.94% Urdu and 0.94% Lambadi as their first language.

Tehsils of Solapur District

== Talukas ==
Solapur district is subdivided for administrative purposes into eleven talukas, which in turn comprise smaller divisions. The talukas are North Solapur, South Solapur, Akkalkot, Barshi, Mangalwedha, Pandharpur, Sangola, Malshiras, Mohol, Madha and Karmala.

== Notable people ==
- Sushilkumar Shinde - Former Home Minister of India
- Akash Thosar - Marathi film actor
- Atul Kulkarni - Marathi and Hindi film actor
- Jabbar Patel - Marathi film director
- Lalchand Hirachand (Industrialist)
- M. F. Husain - painter
- Nagraj Manjule - Marathi film director
- Ranjitsinh Disale - Teacher, Winner of Global Teacher Prize 2020
- Rinku Rajguru - Marathi film actress
- Sarala Yeolekar - Marathi film actress
- Shashikala - Hindi film actress
- Vedhika Kumar - Telugu Actress
- Yusufkhan Mohamadkhan Pathan (Scholar)

== Villages ==
- Fulchincholi
- Morochi
- Nandnee
- Piliv
- Valsang
