= Madha Lok Sabha constituency =

Lok Sabha constituency in Maharashtra

Coordinates: 18.0°N 75.5°E

Madha
- Lok Sabha constituency
- Madha Lok Sabha Constituency map

Constituency details
- Country: India
- Region: Western India
- State: Maharashtra
- Assembly constituencies: Karmala; Madha; Sangola; Malshiras; Phaltan; Man
- Established: 2009
- Total electors: 19,91,454 (2024)
- Reservation: None

Member of Parliament
- 18th Lok Sabha
- Incumbent Dhairyasheel Patil
- Party: NCP-SP
- Alliance: INDIA
- Elected year: 2024
- Preceded by: Ranjit Naik-Nimbalkar

Madha Lok Sabha constituency (43) is one of the 48 Lok Sabha (lower house of Indian parliament) constituencies of Maharashtra state in western India. This constituency was created on 19 February 2008 as a part of the implementation of the Presidential notification based on the recommendations of the Delimitation Commission of India constituted on 12 July 2002. It first held elections in 2009 and its first member of parliament (MP) was Sharad Pawar of the Nationalist Congress Party (NCP). As of the 2024 elections, the constituency's current MP is Dhairyasheel Patil] from NCP(SP).

== Assembly segments ==
At present, Madha Lok Sabha constituency comprises six Vidhan Sabha (legislative assembly) segments. These segments are:

#	Name	District	Member	Party	Leading (in 2024)
244	Karmala	Solapur	Narayan Patil	NCP-SP	NCP-SP
245	Madha	Solapur	Abhijeet Patil	NCP-SP	NCP-SP
253	Sangola	Solapur	Babasaheb Deshmukh	PWPI	BJP
254	Malshiras (SC)	Solapur	Uttamrao Jankar	NCP-SP	NCP-SP
255	Phaltan (SC)	Satara	Sachin Patil	NCP	BJP
258	Man	Satara	Jaykumar Gore	BJP	BJP

== Members of Parliament ==
Year	Name	Party
1951-2009 : See Pandharpur Lok Sabha constituency
2009	Sharad Pawar	Nationalist Congress Party
2014	Vijaysinh Mohite–Patil	Nationalist Congress Party
2019	Ranjit Naik-Nimbalkar	Bharatiya Janata Party
2024	Dhairyasheel Mohite-Patil	Nationalist Congress Party (SP)

== Election results ==
=== 2024 Lok Sabha ===
2024 Indian general elections: Madha
Party	Candidate	Votes	%	±%
NCP-SP	Dhairyasheel Mohite Patil	622,213	48.86	New
BJP	Ranjit Naik-Nimbalkar	5,01,376	39.37	▼8.77
NRSP	Ramchandra Mayappa Guthukade	58,421	4.59	N/A
VBA	Ramesh Baraskar	20,604	1.62	▼2.61
BSP	Swarup Dada Jankar	7,094	0.56	▼0.01
Independent	Hake Laxman Sopan	5,134	0.40	N/A
Independent	Sitaram Vitthal Randive	4,986	0.39	N/A
Independent	Dhanaji Shripati Maske	4,433	0.35	N/A
RPI(A)	Bichukale Santhosh Balasaheb	4,046	0.32	N/A
Independent	Sawant Rahul Shashikant	3,909	0.31	N/A
NOTA	None of the Above	3,702	0.29	▼0.01
Majority		1,20,837	9.49	▲2.44
Turnout		12,75,107	63.87	▲0.17
NCP-SP gain from BJP		Swing		

=== 2019 ===
2019 Indian general elections: Madha
Party	Candidate	Votes	%	±%
BJP	Ranjitsinh Naik-Nimbalkar	585,535	48.14	+5.12
NCP	Sanjaymama Vitthalrao Shinde	4,99,907	41.10	−4.26
VBA	Vijayrao Hanumantrao More	51,532	4.23	
IND	Daulat Umaji Shitole	12,869	1.06	
BSP	Aappa Aaba Lokare	6,883	0.57	
NOTA	None of the Above	3,666	0.30	
Majority		85,764	7.05	+4.7
Turnout		12,16,319	63.7	+1.17
BJP gain from NCP		Swing		

=== General elections 2014 ===
2014 Indian general elections: Madha
Party	Candidate	Votes	%	±%
NCP	Vijaysinh Mohite–Patil	489,989	45.36	−12.32
SWP	Sadabhau Khot	4,64,645	43.02	N/A
Independent	Pratapsinh Shankarrao Mohite–Patil	25,187	2.33	N/A
BSP	Bansode Kundan Fulchand	15,790	1.46	−0.36
Hindustan Praja Paksha	Navanath Bhimrao Patil	8,853	0.82	N/A
Independent	Nagamani Kisan Jakkan	8,829	0.82	+0.52
AAP	Savita Shinde	7,160	0.66	N/A
Independent	Jadhav Sunil Gunda	7,115	0.66	N/A
AITC	Suresh Shamrao Ghadge	1,989	0.18	N/A
NOTA	None of the above	4,209	0.39	N/A
Margin of victory		25,344	2.35	−31.83
Turnout		10,80,167	62.53	+3.49
NCP gain from SWP		Swing		

=== General elections 2009 ===
2009 Indian general elections: Madha
Party	Candidate	Votes	%	±%
NCP	Sharad Pawar	530,596	57.71	N/A
BJP	Subhash Deshmukh	2,16,137	23.51	N/A
RSPS	Mahadev Jankar	98,946	10.76	N/A
BSP	Rahul Sarwade	16,737	1.82	N/A
Independent	Suresh Shamrao Ghadge	14,157	1.54	N/A
Independent	Mahadeo Abaji Pol	13,069	1.42	N/A
Independent	Dnyaneshwar Vitthal Amale	9,695	1.05	N/A
Independent	Bansode Balveer Dagadu	4,097	0.45	N/A
Kranti Kari Jai Hind Sena	Ramchandra Narayan Kacchave	3,271	0.36	N/A
Independent	Nagmani Kisan Jakkan	2,799	0.30	N/A
Independent	Bhanudas Bhagawan Devakate	2,650	0.29	N/A
Independent	Saste Kakasaheb Mahadeo	2,415	0.26	N/A
BBM	Chavan Subhash Vitthal	1,787	0.19	N/A
Prabuddha Republican Party	Ayu Gaikwad Satish Sugrav	1,619	0.18	N/A
Independent	M. D. Patil	1,396	0.15	N/A
Margin of victory		3,14,459	34.18	N/A
Turnout		9,20,051	59.04	N/A
NCP gain from BJP		Swing		
