= Sangola Assembly constituency =

Constituency of the Maharashtra legislative assembly in India

Coordinates: 17.44°N 75.19°E

Sangola
- Constituency No. 253 for the Maharashtra Legislative Assembly

Constituency details
- Country: India
- Region: Western India
- State: Maharashtra
- District: Solapur
- Lok Sabha constituency: Madha
- Established: 1951
- Total electors: 334,379
- Reservation: None

Member of Legislative Assembly
- 15th Maharashtra Legislative Assembly
- Incumbent Babasaheb Deshmukh
- Party: PWPI
- Alliance: MVA
- Elected year: 2024

Sangola Assembly constituency is one of the 288 Vidhan Sabha (legislative assembly) constituencies of Maharashtra state, western India. This constituency is located in Solapur district. Before the formation of Maharashtra as a separate state, the Sangola Assembly constituency was part of the Bombay State during the early years of the Indian Republic.It was a reserved constituency for the 1951 and 1957 Bombay State elections. The constituency is not a reserved constituency. It is a part of Madha Lok Sabha constituency along with five other Vidhan Sabha constituencies, namely Madha, Karmala and Malshiras in Solapur district and Phaltan and Man in Satara district.

== Geographical scope ==
The constituency comprises Sangola] taluka and Jilha parishad gat(Bhalavani) from Pandharpur taluka. In the Sangola Assembly constituency, there is a total voter population of 3,29,048. Out of these, there are 1,70,690 male voters and 1,58,353 female voters. The number of transgender voters in the constituency is 5. Additionally, the voting process is being conducted across a total of 305 polling stations.

== Members of the Legislative Assembly ==
Election	Member	Party
1952	Keshavrao Shripatrao Raut	Indian National Congress
1957	Keshavrao Shripatrao Raut	Indian National Congress
1957	Kambale Maruti Mahadeo	Indian National Congress
1962	Ganpatrao Abasaheb Deshmukh	Peasants and Workers Party of India
1967	Ganpatrao Abasaheb Deshmukh	Peasants and Workers Party of India
1972	Sambhaji Bapusaheb Patil	Indian National Congress
1978	Ganpatrao Abasaheb Deshmukh	Peasants and Workers Party of India
1980	Ganpatrao Abasaheb Deshmukh	Peasants and Workers Party of India
1985	Ganpatrao Abasaheb Deshmukh	Peasants and Workers Party of India
1990	Ganpatrao Abasaheb Deshmukh	Peasants and Workers Party of India
1995	Shahajibapu Rajaram Patil	Indian National Congress
1999	Ganpatrao Abasaheb Deshmukh	Peasants and Workers Party of India
2004	Ganpatrao Abasaheb Deshmukh	Peasants and Workers Party of India
2009	Ganpatrao Abasaheb Deshmukh	Peasants and Workers Party of India
2014	Ganpatrao Abasaheb Deshmukh	Peasants and Workers Party of India
2019	Shahajibapu Rajaram Patil	Shiv Sena
2024	Dr. Babasaheb Deshmukh	Peasants and Workers Party of India

== Election results ==
=== Assembly Election 2024 ===
2024 Maharashtra Legislative Assembly election : Sangola
Party	Candidate	Votes	%	±%
PWPI	Dr. Babasaheb Deshmukh	116,256	44.28%	▼1.67
SHS	Adv. Shahajibapu Patil	90,870	34.61%	▼11.70
SS(UBT)	Dipakaaba Bapusaheb Salunkhe	50,962	19.41%	New
NOTA	None of the above	1,106	0.42%	▲0.09
Margin of victory		25,386	9.67%	▲9.31
Turnout		263,679	78.86%	▲5.79
Total valid votes		262,573		
Registered electors		334,379		▲13.39
PWPI gain from SHS		Swing	▼2.03	

=== Assembly Election 2019 ===
2019 Maharashtra Legislative Assembly election : Sangola
Party	Candidate	Votes	%	±%
SS	Adv. Shahajibapu Patil	99,464	46.31%	▲11.28
PWPI	Dr. Aniket Chandrakant Deshmukh	98,696	45.95%	▼1.85
Independent	Rajashritai Dattatraya Nagane - Patil	4,484	2.09%	New
Independent	Rajaram Damu Kalebag	1,928	0.90%	New
Independent	Bapusaheb Chandu Thokale	1,568	0.73%	New
NOTA	None of the above	700	0.33%	▼0.01
Margin of victory		768	0.36%	▼12.42
Turnout		215,486	73.07%	▲0.04
Total valid votes		214,768		
Registered electors		294,895		▲8.67
SS gain from PWPI		Swing	▼1.49	

=== Assembly Election 2014 ===
2014 Maharashtra Legislative Assembly election : Sangola
Party	Candidate	Votes	%	±%
PWPI	Ganpatrao Abasaheb Deshmukh	94,374	47.80%	▲0.64
SS	Adv. Shahajibapu Patil	69,150	35.03%	▲34.13
BJP	Deshmukh Shrikant Appsaheb	14,074	7.13%	New
Independent	Aldar Sambhaji Ramchandra	7,444	3.77%	New
INC	Jagdish Lalaso Babar	3,457	1.75%	▼40.07
BSP	Bansode Milind Revan	2,323	1.18%	▲0.05
BMP	Kamruddin Aftabshaha Kazi	1,317	0.67%	New
NOTA	None of the above	666	0.34%	New
Margin of victory		25,224	12.78%	▲7.44
Turnout		198,197	73.03%	▲0.15
Total valid votes		197,420		
Registered electors		271,376		▲7.49
PWPI hold		Swing	▲0.64	

=== Assembly Election 2009 ===
2009 Maharashtra Legislative Assembly election : Sangola
Party	Candidate	Votes	%	±%
PWPI	Ganpatrao Abasaheb Deshmukh	86,548	47.16%	▼5.48
INC	Adv. Shahajibapu Patil	76,744	41.82%	▲0.02
JSS	Deshmukh Shrikant Appsaheb	13,997	7.63%	New
Independent	Adv. Machhindra Aappaso Patil	2,506	1.37%	New
BSP	Dethe Navanath Bhagawan	2,078	1.13%	▲0.46
SS	Walake Jalindar Shivaling	1,651	0.90%	New
Margin of victory		9,804	5.34%	▼5.50
Turnout		183,994	72.88%	▼5.40
Total valid votes		183,524		
Registered electors		252,474		▲3.97
PWPI hold		Swing	▼5.48	

=== Assembly Election 2004 ===
2004 Maharashtra Legislative Assembly election : Sangola
Party	Candidate	Votes	%	±%
PWPI	Ganpatrao Abasaheb Deshmukh	100,000	52.64%	▼7.82
INC	Adv. Shahajibapu Patil	79,404	41.80%	▲39.77
BJP	Gaikwad Shivajirao Krishnarao	3,768	1.98%	▼0.69
Independent	Shankarrao Dattuji Linge	3,410	1.79%	New
Independent	Navale Somnath Krishna	2,118	1.11%	New
BSP	Tanaji Sopan Howal	1,277	0.67%	New
Margin of victory		20,596	10.84%	▼15.15
Turnout		190,100	78.28%	▼2.61
Total valid votes		189,977		
Registered electors		242,836		▲21.29
PWPI hold		Swing	▼7.82	

=== Assembly Election 1999 ===
1999 Maharashtra Legislative Assembly election : Sangola
Party	Candidate	Votes	%	±%
PWPI	Ganpatrao Abasaheb Deshmukh	93,819	60.46%	New
Independent	Adv. Shahajibapu Patil	53,485	34.47%	New
BJP	Shankar Dattu Linge	4,145	2.67%	▲0.92
INC	Shende Amar Shivajirao	3,156	2.03%	▼46.23
Margin of victory		40,334	25.99%	▲25.86
Turnout		161,950	80.89%	▼1.67
Total valid votes		155,179		
Registered electors		200,206		▲5.63
PWPI gain from INC		Swing	▲12.20	

=== Assembly Election 1995 ===
1995 Maharashtra Legislative Assembly election : Sangola
Party	Candidate	Votes	%	±%
INC	Adv. Shahajibapu Patil	73,910	48.26%	▲5.36
PWPI	Ganpatrao Abasaheb Deshmukh	73,718	48.13%	▼7.27
BJP	Dr. Ganpatrao Misal	2,675	1.75%	▲0.55
Margin of victory		192	0.13%	▼12.37
Turnout		156,478	82.56%	▲8.34
Total valid votes		153,155		
Registered electors		189,538		▲6.08
INC gain from PWPI		Swing	▼7.14	

=== Assembly Election 1990 ===
1990 Maharashtra Legislative Assembly election : Sangola
Party	Candidate	Votes	%	±%
PWPI	Ganpatrao Abasaheb Deshmukh	72,341	55.40%	▲0.99
INC	Adv. Shahajibapu Patil	56,023	42.90%	▼2.69
BJP	Kolekar Bhanudas Eknath	1,563	1.20%	New
Margin of victory		16,318	12.50%	▲3.67
Turnout		132,608	74.22%	▲4.46
Total valid votes		130,576		
Registered electors		178,667		▲21.53
PWPI hold		Swing	▲0.99	

=== Assembly Election 1985 ===
1985 Maharashtra Legislative Assembly election : Sangola
Party	Candidate	Votes	%	±%
PWPI	Ganpatrao Abasaheb Deshmukh	54,816	54.41%	▼3.04
INC	Bhambyre Pandurang Abasaheb	45,923	45.59%	New
Margin of victory		8,893	8.83%	▼6.08
Turnout		102,557	69.76%	▲2.09
Total valid votes		100,739		
Registered electors		147,009		▲15.67
PWPI hold		Swing	▼3.04	

=== Assembly Election 1980 ===
1980 Maharashtra Legislative Assembly election : Sangola
Party	Candidate	Votes	%	±%
PWPI	Ganpatrao Abasaheb Deshmukh	48,262	57.45%	▼6.24
INC(I)	P. A. Bhambure	35,739	42.55%	▲41.35
Margin of victory		12,523	14.91%	▼13.92
Turnout		86,001	67.67%	▲2.31
Total valid votes		84,001		
Registered electors		127,096		▲8.43
PWPI hold		Swing	▼6.24	

=== Assembly Election 1978 ===
1978 Maharashtra Legislative Assembly election : Sangola
Party	Candidate	Votes	%	±%
PWPI	Ganpatrao Abasaheb Deshmukh	47,625	63.69%	▲15.27
INC	Ghadage Bajirao Dadasaheb	26,067	34.86%	▼16.08
INC(I)	Patil Ishwarrao Balasaheb	898	1.20%	New
Margin of victory		21,558	28.83%	▲26.31
Turnout		76,620	65.36%	▼7.80
Total valid votes		74,779		
Registered electors		117,220		▲27.77
PWPI gain from INC		Swing	▲12.75	

=== Assembly Election 1972 ===
1972 Maharashtra Legislative Assembly election : Sangola
Party	Candidate	Votes	%	±%
INC	S. Bapusaheb Patil	33,448	50.94%	▲1.57
PWPI	Ganpatrao Abasaheb Deshmukh	31,793	48.42%	▼2.21
Independent	Parapsa Khadtare	416	0.63%	New
Margin of victory		1,655	2.52%	▲1.26
Turnout		67,119	73.16%	▲5.09
Total valid votes		65,657		
Registered electors		91,744		▲10.37
INC gain from PWPI		Swing	▲0.31	

=== Assembly Election 1967 ===
1967 Maharashtra Legislative Assembly election : Sangola
Party	Candidate	Votes	%	±%
PWPI	Ganpatrao Abasaheb Deshmukh	26,843	50.63%	▲0.11
INC	B. B. Salunkhe	26,175	49.37%	▲4.69
Margin of victory		668	1.26%	▼4.58
Turnout		56,581	68.07%	▲18.69
Total valid votes		53,018		
Registered electors		83,122		▲9.31
PWPI hold		Swing	▲0.11	

=== Assembly Election 1962 ===
1962 Maharashtra Legislative Assembly election : Sangola
Party	Candidate	Votes	%	±%
PWPI	Ganpatrao Abasaheb Deshmukh	17,800	50.52%	▲34.75
INC	Keshavrao Shripatrao Raut	15,743	44.68%	▼1.44
Independent	Shivaji Tipanna Bansode	1,692	4.80%	New
Margin of victory		2,057	5.84%	▲2.07
Turnout		37,549	49.38%	▼34.69
Total valid votes		35,235		
Registered electors		76,040		▼39.39
PWPI gain from INC		Swing	▲26.08	

=== Assembly Election 1957 ===
1957 Bombay State Legislative Assembly election : Sangola
Party	Candidate	Votes	%	±%
INC	Keshavrao Shripatrao Raut	25,779	24.44%	▼21.72
INC	Kambale Maruti Mahadeo	22,868	21.68%	▼24.48
SCF	Ranashringare Ramchandra Sakharam	21,798	20.67%	▲12.33
PWPI	Pawar Jaysingrao Rangarao	16,630	15.77%	▼22.17
Independent	Honamane Pandurang Mailarling	15,167	14.38%	New
Independent	Pawar Rayaba Jogu	3,237	3.07%	New
Margin of victory		3,981	3.77%	▼4.46
Turnout		105,479	84.07%	▲37.58
Total valid votes		105,479		
Registered electors		125,464		▲154.18
INC hold		Swing	▼21.72	

=== Assembly Election 1952 ===
1952 Bombay State Legislative Assembly election : Sangola
Party	Candidate	Votes	%	±%
INC	Keshavrao Shripatrao Raut	10,593	46.16%	New
PWPI	Patange Sopan Abaji	8,705	37.94%	New
SCF	Magade Govind Pandurang	1,913	8.34%	New
Independent	Kavade Tulshiram Narayan	1,735	7.56%	New
Margin of victory		1,888	8.23%	
Turnout		22,946	46.49%	
Total valid votes		22,946		
Registered electors		49,361		
INC win (new seat)				

== See also ==
- List of constituencies of the Maharashtra Legislative Assembly
- Solapur district
