= Laul =

Village in Solapur (Maharashtra), India

Type
- Type: Gram Panchayat of the 17 Members

Leadership
- Sarpanch: Mr. Pavan Bhong, Darling Gramvikas Aaghadi Nationalist Congress Party
- Deputy Sarpanch: Mrs. Manisha Chandrakant Gawali, Darling Gramvikas Aaghadi Nationalist Congress Party

Structure
- Seats: 10/17
- Political groups: Ruling Party (10): NCP (10); Opposition (6): SS (6); Others (1): Siddheshwar Gramvikas Aghadi (1)

Elections
- Last election: 2021

Laul
- Village
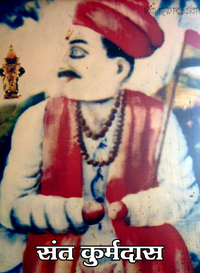
- Sant Shri Kurmadas Maharaj

- Location within Maharashtra Location within India
- Coordinates: 18.036785°N 75.392804°E
- Country: India
- State: Maharashtra
- District: Solapur

Government
  - Type: Panchayati Raj
  - Body: Gram Panchayat

Population (2011)
  - Total: 7,516

Languages
  - Official: Marathi, Hindi, English
- Time zone: UTC+5:30 (IST)
- PIN: 413208
- STD Code: 02183
- Vehicle registration: MH-45 (Akluj Passing)
- Lok Sabha: Madha (Lok Sabha constituency)
- Vidhan Sabha: Madha (Vidhan Sabha constituency)
- Website: www.amhilaulkar.com

Laul, also known as the village of Sant Shri Kurmadas Maharaj, is situated in the Madha Taluka of Solapur District, within the Indian state of Maharashtra. It falls under the jurisdiction of the Pune Division. Laul is located approximately 81 kilometers west of Solapur, the district headquarters, and is about 6 kilometers from the Kurduvadi Junction railway station. The village is approximately 380 kilometers from Mumbai, the state capital.

Several villages are located near Laul, including Kurdu (5 km), Shiral Madha (5 km), Ghatane (6 km), Ujani Madha (6 km), Padsali (7 km), and Ambad (Te) (7 km). Laul is bordered by Paranda Taluka to the north, Mohol and Barshi to the east, and Indapur to the west.
Nearby cities include Pandharpur, Kurduvadi, Solapur, and Osmanabad.

The village operates under the Panchayati Raj system of local governance.

Laul also has a railway station, though it is closed as it was used by relatively few people.

== Sant Shri Kurmadas Maharaj ==
Laul holds a significant place in the spiritual history of Maharashtra, as it is the birthplace of the revered saint, Sant Shri Kurmadas Maharaj. He is a source of inspiration for the entire Varkari Sampradaya, a religious movement in Maharashtra.

Sant Shri Kurmadas Maharaj's devotion to Lord Vitthala is exemplified by his pilgrimage to Pandharpur, despite his physical limitations. His determination to visit Lord Vitthala and Rukmai in Pandharpur, after listening to the kirtan of Bhanudas Maharaj, is a testament to his unwavering faith.

He, along with Sant Tukaram and Sant Dnyaneshwar, were prominent saints who dedicated their lives to the worship of Lord Vitthala. Their teachings and devotion continue to inspire millions of devotees even today.

The annual Yatra of Sant Shri Kurmadas Maharaj, which has been celebrated in Laul for the past 700 to 800 years on Ashadhi Ekadashi, is a major event for the Varkari community. It is believed that the Pandhri Vari, the pilgrimage to Pandharpur, is complete only after visiting the temple of Sant Shri Kurmadas Maharaj in Laul.

The Palkhi procession, which takes place in the month of Ashadh, is a major attraction in Laul. Devotees from far and wide participate in this procession, carrying the palhi of Sant Shri Kurmadas Maharaj.

The temple of Sant Shri Kurmadas Maharaj is located outside Laul, on the Sant Eknath Maharaj Palkhi Marg, which is also known as the Pandharpur Road. This temple serves as a place of pilgrimage and worship for devotees, who seek the blessings of the revered saint.

== Demographics ==
The total geographical area of the village is 4,458 hectares (11,020 acres). Laul has a total population of 7,516 peoples, out of which male population is 3,971 while female population is 3,545.

Literacy rate of laul village is 66.54% out of which 72.80% males and 59.52% females are literate as per 2011 census of India in 2011.

There are about 1,523 houses in laul village. Pincode of laul village locality is 413208. In 2011, the literacy rate of the Laul village was 76.36% compared to 82.34% of Maharashtra.

== Political leaders ==
- Dhairyasheel Mohite-Patil, Member of Parliament, Madha (Lok Sabha constituency), Nationalist Congress Party - Sharadchandra Pawar
- Abhijeet Dhananjay Patil, Member of Legislative Assembly, Madha (Vidhan Sabha constituency), Nationalist Congress Party – Sharadchandra Pawar
- Babanrao Vitthalrao Shinde, Ex-Member of Legislative Assembly, Madha (Vidhan Sabha constituency), Nationalist Congress Party
- Shri Shivaji Kambale, Member, Zilla Parishad: Modnimb Gat, Bharatiya Janta Party
- Sau. Sonali Mali, Member, Taluka Panchayat Samiti: Laul Gan, Bharatiya Janta Party

== Delegates from Laul ==
- Shri Prataprao Shankarrao Nalawade, Nationalist Congress Party, Former Deputy Sabhapati Madha Panchayat Samiti.
- Shri. Pavan Bhong, Sarpanch, Grampanchayat: Laul, Nationalist Congress Party
- Mrs. Manisha Chandrakant Gawali, Dy. Sarpanch, Grampanchayat: Laul, Nationalist Congress Party
- Society Chairman : Maj. Maruti Bhajandas Lokare, Nationalist Congress Party, Former Indian Army, Corps of Military Police (India)
- Shri Parmeshwar Kokate Guruji, Ex. Chairman of Madha Taluka ZP Teacher Society, Madha, Self-Retired Primary Teacher, started Modern Farming by using automation technologies like simcard Motor Starter

== Education ==
The ZP Primary School offers education up to 4th standard and includes six smaller sub-schools (Vasti Shaala)
Shri Kurmadas Vidyamandir, a high school managed by Shri Swami Vivekananda Shikshan Sanstha, Kolhapur, also serves the community.
Collectively, these schools educate approximately 1200 students, with a near-zero dropout rate.

== Water Resources ==
The Laul grampanchayat possesses abundant water resources, facilitated by a state government scheme.
Agricultural irrigation is further supported by the "Sina – Madha Lift Irrigation Scheme", which utilizes a canal pumping from the Bhima River.

== Economy ==
The principal occupations in Laul are agriculture and animal husbandry. The local economy is significantly dependent on the monsoon.
Laul is the leading milk producer in the Madha taluka. The provision of canal water from the Ujani Dam for agricultural purposes has resulted in the tremendous economic growth.
Furthermore, a substantial portion of the village population is engaged in the textile trade business.

The financial needs of people are completed by the public sector banks. The following banks have branches in Laul:

- Bank of India, Nationalized bank. ATM service is available.
- Solapur District Central Co-operative bank, Cooperative bank.
- Also there is State Bank of India Laul Dist Solapur (Mini Branch) for banking purpose
