= Shankarrao Mohite-Patil =

Indian politician

Maharashtra Legislative Assembly
- In office 1952–1972
- Succeeded by: Vijaysinh Mohite

Personal details
- Born: Akluj, Solapur district
- Party: Indian National Congress
- Children: Vijaysinh Mohite–Patil
- Occupation: Politician
- Profession: Politician

Shankarrao Mohite-Patil was an Indian politician and member of the Congress party.

== Career ==
He started his legislative career by representing Akluj in the erstwhile Bombay Legislative Assembly from 1952 to 1960. Later he represented the same seat of Akluj (later Malshiras) in the newly created Maharashtra Legislative Assembly from 1960 to 1972.

== Personal life and family ==
In the 1970s, the expensive wedding of his daughter was heavily criticized.

He was father of former Deputy Chief Minister of Maharashtra Vijaysinh Mohite–Patil and Pratapsinh Mohite-Patil as well as grandfather of Ranjitsinh Mohite-Patil who was the first president of the state unit of Nationalist Youth Congress.

== Legacy ==
- Mohite was given the Epithet Sahakar Maharshi for his pioneering work in the cooperative sector.
- The cooperative sugar factory he established in Akluj initially named Yashwant sahakari sakhar karkhana was renamed in his honour.
- For his influence in the cooperative sugar sector, he was called one of sugar barons.
- He is the founder of a political dynasty that dominates politics of Malshiras taluka and the Solapur district.
