= Akluj =

- town
- Location in Maharashtra, India
- Coordinates: 17°53′N 75°1′E
- INDIA (भारत): India

Government
  - Body: Akluj Municipal council
- Elevation: 487 m (1,598 ft)

Population (2011)
  - Total: 39,919

Languages - Marathi
- Time zone: UTC+5:30 (IST)
- PIN: 413101
- Telephone code: area code +912185
- Vehicle registration: MH-45
- Lok Sabha constituency: Madha
- Vidhan Sabha constituency: Malshiras
- Climate: Mean annual temperature 36 °C, Mean annual rainfall 450 mm

Akluj is a town on the banks of Nira in Solapur district, Maharashtra, India. Akluj was earlier known for its large trade in cotton, which has almost disappeared at present. It is on the bank of River Nira. The town and surrounding area is agriculturally rich. Former deputy chief minister of Maharashtra, Vijaysinh Mohite–Patil was the sarpanch of Akluj.

== Historical background ==
Akluj is one of the biggest and richest grampanchayat in India. The name Akluj is believed to be derived from 'Shri Akalai Devi' which is Gramadevata of Akluj. It was built by Raja Singhan in the 13th century. Evidence shows that, after Yadavas it was ruled by Mughals and Britishers. Aurangjeb's Subhedar for south named Bahadur Khan appointed Shaikh Ali as a chief official of the Akluj fort in 1673 and Ranmastkhan was appointed as a chief Thanedar in 1675. Evidences also shows that in 1679 Diler Khan and Sambhaji stayed in the Akluj Fort for 4 months. Baji Rao II also stayed for three months in this fort, when he was dismissed from Maratha Empire by Britishers in 1802. When Sambhaji was trapped by Mughals in 1689, Mughal Sardar traveled through Akluj. Aurangzeb renamed Akluj as S'adnagar in 1689. It was also known as Asadpur during Mughal period. In 1792 Captain Moor, the author of the Hindu Pantheon, described it as " Akhloos, a large respectable town with a well supplied market and with a fort and several handsome buildings and wells ". In 1803 on his march from Srirangapatna to Pune to reinstate Bajirao II, General Wellesley halted at Akluj from the 13 to 15 April. All these incident shows that from the medieval period, Akluj was important and famous as historical place.

Nowadays Akluj is developed around its peripheral, where many hospitals, small businesses have grown. Farming and business are major source of income in this region. Akluj has good hotels, and parks.

== Location ==
Akluj is in Malshiras tehsil and is 120 km (75 mi) away from Solapur. It is located on the right bank of Nira River. The elevation of Akluj is 551 m (1,808 ft). The latitude 17.9000 and longitude 75.0333. The altitude in feet 1581 Lat (DMS) north 17° 53' 60 N Long (DMS) east 75° 1' 60E altitude (meters) 481.

== Climate ==
The Akluj is a part of Deccan plateau so its area is flat. In general the climate of Akluj is suitable for farming and is characterized by three seasons namely summer, winter and rainy. The special characteristic of climate of the Akluj is dry except during the monsoon season. The mean annual temperature of Akluj is 36 °C (97 °F). Month of May is generally hottest (up to 42 °C (108 °F)) month of the year. September has pleasant weather with average 26 °C (79 °F) temperature. The mean annual rainfall at Akluj is 450 mm (18 in)

== Population ==
As of 2011, the current population is approximately 40,000.

A common development plan is sanctioned for Akluj, Yashwantnagar, Sangramnagar, Malewadi, Chaundeswarwadi, Malinagar, Anandnagar, Bagewadi and Savatgavhan village cluster.

== Nearby airports ==
- Baramati Airport (65 km [40 mi])
- Solapur Airport (119 km [74 mi])
- Pune Airport (165 km [103 mi]

== Nearby railway stations ==
- Pandharpur (44 km [27 mi])
- Kurduwadi Jn (50 km [31 mi])
- Sangola (60 km [37 mi])
- Baramati (65 km [40 mi])
- Phaltan (69 km [43 mi])
- Solapur (119 km [74 mi])
- Miraj Jn (162 km [101 mi])
- Pune Jn (165 km [103 mi])

== Politics ==
Akluj's political atmosphere has always revolved around one prominent family: Mohite-Patil. The late Shri. Shankarao Mohite Patil (Ex. MLA 1952–1972) started with social politics. After him Shri. Vijaysinh Mohite Patil, led politics in Solapur district. Both worked on fundamental infrastructure and worked in transportation, sugar industry and irrigation sectors.

List of MLA's from Malshiras Constituency

- 1952 - Shankarrao Mohite-Patil, INC
- 1957 - Shankarrao Mohite-Patil, INC
- 1962 - Shankarrao Mohite-Patil, INC
- 1967 - Shankarrao Mohite-Patil, INC
- 1972 - Changojirao Deshmukh, INC
- 1978 - Shyamrao Patil, Janata Party
- 1980 - Vijaysinh Mohite–Patil, Independent
- 1985 - Vijaysinh Mohite–Patil, INC
- 1990 - Vijaysinh Mohite–Patil, INC
- 1995 - Vijaysinh Mohite–Patil, INC
- 1999 - Vijaysinh Mohite–Patil, NCP
- 2004 - Vijaysinh Mohite–Patil, NCP
- 2009 - Hanumant Dolas, NCP
- 2014 - Hanumant Dolas, NCP
- 2019 - Ram Satpute, BJP
- 2024 - Uttamrao Jankar, NCP (SP)

== Education ==
Akluj has almost all type of well known educational institutions. Which includes, Engineering, Pharmacy, Education (D.Ed. & BEd), Agri, I.T.I., English medium schools and also colleges of arts, science, Computer, Management, Nursing & commerce educations. Few of them are mentioned below

- Shankarrao Mohite-Patil Mahavidhyalaya, Malevadi
- Sadashivrao Mane Vidyalaya (SMV)
- Green-Fingers English Medium School
- Sahkar Maharshi Shankarrao Mohite-Patil Institute of Technology and Research (Engineering college)
- Vijaysinh Mohite-Patil College of Nursing
- Rajsinh Mohite-Patil Institute of Management Studies
- Green-fingers College of Computer & Technology
- Vijaysinh Mohite-Patil English Medium D.Ted College
- Ratnai college of Agriculture
- Shankarrao Mohite-Patil English Medium School
- Maharshi Shankarrao Mohite-Patil Prashala
- Akluj Night School
- Shrimati Ratnaprabhadevi Mohite-Patil Home Science
- College of Pharmacy (B. Pharmacy & D. Pharmacy)
- Aklai Vidyalaya

== Flora and fauna ==
Common birds seen

- Sunbird - सुर्य पक्षी
- sparrow - चिमणी
- Myna - साळूंखी
- Laughing dove - छोटा तपकिरी होला
- Kite - घार
- Brahminy kite - मोरंगी घार
- Crow - कावळा
- Cuckoo - कोकीळ
- Red-wattled lapwing -टिटवी
- Green bee-eater - वेडा राघू
- Red-vented bulbul - लालबुड्या बुलबुल
- Brahminy Starling - भांगपाडी मैना
- Kingfisher - खंड्या पक्षी / ढिवर
- Parrot - पोपट
- Greater coucal - भारद्वाज पक्षी
- Jungle Babbler - जंगली सातभाई
- Scaly-breasted Munia - ठिपकेवाली मनोली (मुनिया)
- Oriental magpie-robin - दयाळ
- Indian robin - चीरक
- Ashy prinia - राखी वटवट्या
- Common tailorbird - शिंपी
- Common iora - सुभग
- Long-tailed shrike - तांबूस पाठीचा खाटीक
- Grey thornbill - धनेश
- Egret - बगळा
- White wagtail - धोबी

== Site Seeing nearby ==
- Shri Aklai Devi Mandir, Akluj
- Akluj Fort, Akluj
- Shri Mahadeo Mandir, Yashwantnagar
- Laser show at evening, Yashwantnagar
- Anandi Ganesh Mandir, Anandnagar
- Swaymbhu Mahadeo Mandir, Anandnagar
- June Chalukya mandir, Velapur (11.5 km [7.1 mi])
- Ardha Narinateshwar Mandir, Velapur (11.5 km [7.1 mi])
- Shree Lakshmi Narasimha Mandir, Nira Narsingpur
