= Madha, Maharashtra =

Madha
- city
- Location in Maharashtra, India
- Coordinates: 18.0167°N 75.5167°E
- Country: India
- State: Maharashtra
- District: Solapur
- Elevation: 491 m (1,611 ft)

Population (2001)
  - Total: 27,731

Languages
  - Official: Marathi
- Time zone: UTC+5:30 (IST)
- PIN: 413209
- ISO 3166 code: IN-MH
- Website: www.madheshwari.com

Madha is a city in the municipal council of Madha Taluka, in Solapur district in the Indian state of Maharashtra. It belongs to Solapur Division . It is located 70 km towards North-West from district headquarters Solapur. Madha is also known for the Madheshawari temple, situated near Mankarna river. The historic temple of Lord Vitthal is in Madha City. Madha Fort built by Raje Nimbalkar is a big attraction in the city.

== See also ==
- Madha (Lok Sabha constituency)
- Madha Taluka
- Madha (Vidhan Sabha constituency)
