= Satpute =

Satpute may refer to:

- Aamhi Satpute, 2008 Indian film
- Ram Satpute, Indian politician
