= Man Assembly constituency =

Constituency of the Maharashtra legislative assembly in India

Coordinates: 17.70°N 74.54°E

Man
- Constituency No. 258 for the Maharashtra Legislative Assembly

Constituency details
- Country: India
- Region: Western India
- State: Maharashtra
- District: Satara
- Lok Sabha constituency: Madha
- Established: 1962
- Total electors: 362,328
- Reservation: None

Member of Legislative Assembly
- 15th Maharashtra Legislative Assembly
- Incumbent Jaykumar Gore
- Party: BJP
- Alliance: NDA
- Elected year: 2024

Man Assembly constituency of Maharashtra Vidhan Sabha is one of the constituencies located in Satara district.

It is a part of Madha Lok Sabha constituency, along with five other assembly constituencies, namely Phaltan in Satara district and Karmala, Madha, Sangole, Malsiras in Solapur district.

== Members of the Legislative Assembly ==
| Year | Member | Party |
|---|---|---|
| 1962 | Laxman Bhingardeve | Indian National Congress |
| 1967 | P. T. Sonawane | Indian National Congress |
| 1972 | Prabhawati G Shinde | Indian National Congress |
| 1978 | Vishnu Sonavane | Indian National Congress |
| 1980 | Vishnu Sonavane | Indian National Congress (U) |
| 1985 | Vishnu Sonavane | Indian Congress (Socialist) |
| 1990 | Dhondiram Waghmare | Independent |
| 1995 | Dhondiram Waghmare | Independent |
| 1999 | Tukaram Tupe | Nationalist Congress Party |
| 2004 | Sampatrao Awaghade | Nationalist Congress Party |
| 2009 | Jaykumar Gore | Independent |
| 2014 | Jaykumar Gore | Indian National Congress |
| 2019 | Jaykumar Gore | Bharatiya Janata Party |
| 2024 | Jaykumar Gore | Bharatiya Janata Party |

== Election results ==
=== Assembly Election 2024 ===
2024 Maharashtra Legislative Assembly election : Man
| Party | Candidate | Votes | % | ±% |
|---|---|---|---|---|
| BJP | Jaykumar Gore | 150,021 | 57.13% | ▲16.70 |
| NCP-SP | Prabhakar Devba Gharge | 100,346 | 38.21% | New |
| Swarajya Sena (maharashtra) | Engg. Satyawan Vijay Ombase | 2,638 | 1.00% | New |
| NOTA | None of the Above | 574 | 0.22% | ▼0.46 |
| Margin of victory | | 49,675 | 18.92% | ▲17.57 |
| Turnout | | 263,192 | 72.64% | ▲6.32 |
| Total valid votes | | 262,618 | | |
| Registered electors | | 362,328 | | ▲5.96 |
| BJP hold | | Swing | ▲16.70 | |

=== Assembly Election 2019 ===
2019 Maharashtra Legislative Assembly election : Man
| Party | Candidate | Votes | % | ±% |
|---|---|---|---|---|
| BJP | Jaykumar Gore | 91,469 | 40.43% | New |
| Independent | Prabhakar Krushnaji Deshmukh | 88,426 | 39.08% | New |
| SS | Shekhar Bhagwanrao Gore | 37,539 | 16.59% | ▲2.39 |
| BMP | Amrut Popat Suryavanshi | 3,340 | 1.48% | New |
| VBA | Pramod Ramchandra Gawade | 1,927 | 0.85% | New |
| NOTA | None of the Above | 1,525 | 0.67% | ▲0.30 |
| Margin of victory | | 3,043 | 1.34% | ▼9.34 |
| Turnout | | 228,044 | 66.69% | ▼3.91 |
| Total valid votes | | 226,261 | | |
| Registered electors | | 341,964 | | ▲9.70 |
| BJP gain from INC | | Swing | ▲5.77 | |

=== Assembly Election 2014 ===
2014 Maharashtra Legislative Assembly election : Man
| Party | Candidate | Votes | % | ±% |
|---|---|---|---|---|
| INC | Jaykumar Gore | 75,708 | 34.66% | New |
| RSPS | Gore Shekhar Bhagwanrao | 52,357 | 23.97% | ▲13.93 |
| NCP | Sadashiva Aabaji Pol | 35,562 | 16.28% | ▼13.85 |
| SS | Ranjeet Dhairyashil Deshmukh | 31,032 | 14.21% | New |
| Independent | Anil Shivajirao Desai | 18,291 | 8.37% | New |
| MNS | Dhairyashil Shahaji (Patil) Katte | 1,495 | 0.68% | New |
| NOTA | None of the Above | 816 | 0.37% | New |
| Margin of victory | | 23,351 | 10.69% | ▲8.51 |
| Turnout | | 219,336 | 70.36% | ▲3.15 |
| Total valid votes | | 218,446 | | |
| Registered electors | | 311,738 | | ▲11.04 |
| INC gain from Independent | | Swing | ▲2.35 | |

=== Assembly Election 2009 ===
2009 Maharashtra Legislative Assembly election : Man
| Party | Candidate | Votes | % | ±% |
|---|---|---|---|---|
| Independent | Jaykumar Gore | 60,703 | 32.31% | New |
| NCP | Sadashiv Abaji Pol | 56,605 | 30.13% | ▼10.51 |
| BJP | Dr.Yelgaonkar Dilip Murlidhar | 41,585 | 22.13% | New |
| RSPS | Gudage Surendra Mohanrao | 18,870 | 10.04% | ▼6.25 |
| Independent | Suresh Dadu Shinde | 2,461 | 1.31% | New |
| Independent | Sangita Pandurang Shelar | 2,066 | 1.10% | New |
| Margin of victory | | 4,098 | 2.18% | ▼11.25 |
| Turnout | | 188,110 | 67.00% | ▼1.59 |
| Total valid votes | | 187,898 | | |
| Registered electors | | 280,755 | | ▲33.86 |
| Independent gain from NCP | | Swing | ▼8.33 | |

=== Assembly Election 2004 ===
2004 Maharashtra Legislative Assembly election : Man
| Party | Candidate | Votes | % | ±% |
|---|---|---|---|---|
| NCP | Awaghade Sampatrao Ganapat | 58,398 | 40.64% | ▼1.28 |
| SS | Mane Baburao Jotiram | 39,095 | 27.20% | ▲3.60 |
| RSPS | Tupe Dilip Ramchandra | 23,416 | 16.29% | New |
| Independent | Tupe Tukaram Namdeo | 12,021 | 8.36% | New |
| BSP | Shilwant Rhushikesh Dattatraya | 3,149 | 2.19% | New |
| Independent | Shinde Shankarrao Dadu | 2,316 | 1.61% | New |
| Independent | Awale Namdeo Dadu | 2,111 | 1.47% | New |
| Margin of victory | | 19,303 | 13.43% | ▲3.30 |
| Turnout | | 143,766 | 68.54% | ▲4.98 |
| Total valid votes | | 143,713 | | |
| Registered electors | | 209,745 | | ▲21.46 |
| NCP hold | | Swing | ▼1.28 | |

=== Assembly Election 1999 ===
1999 Maharashtra Legislative Assembly election : Man
| Party | Candidate | Votes | % | ±% |
|---|---|---|---|---|
| NCP | Tupe Tukaram Namdeo | 45,993 | 41.92% | New |
| INC | Waghmare Dhondiram Ganapati | 34,876 | 31.79% | ▼2.50 |
| SS | Tupe Dilip Ramchandra | 25,902 | 23.61% | ▲18.65 |
| ABS | Bapurao Nabaji Kambale | 1,054 | 0.96% | New |
| Independent | Shivaji Punaji Tupe | 905 | 0.82% | New |
| Margin of victory | | 11,117 | 10.13% | ▼9.01 |
| Turnout | | 116,452 | 67.44% | ▼8.61 |
| Total valid votes | | 109,717 | | |
| Registered electors | | 172,683 | | ▼0.28 |
| NCP gain from Independent | | Swing | ▼11.52 | |

=== Assembly Election 1995 ===
1995 Maharashtra Legislative Assembly election : Man
| Party | Candidate | Votes | % | ±% |
|---|---|---|---|---|
| Independent | Waghmare Dhondiram Ganapati | 66,765 | 53.44% | New |
| INC | Sonavane Vishnu Tatoba | 42,844 | 34.29% | New |
| SS | Khade J. G. | 6,189 | 4.95% | ▼4.58 |
| BSP | Sawant N. B. | 3,566 | 2.85% | New |
| Independent | Adhav C. B. | 1,656 | 1.33% | New |
| Independent | Kengar P. C. | 896 | 0.72% | New |
| Margin of victory | | 23,921 | 19.15% | ▲16.66 |
| Turnout | | 128,140 | 74.00% | ▲13.13 |
| Total valid votes | | 124,938 | | |
| Registered electors | | 173,173 | | ▲3.43 |
| Independent hold | | Swing | ▲14.48 | |

=== Assembly Election 1990 ===
1990 Maharashtra Legislative Assembly election : Man
| Party | Candidate | Votes | % | ±% |
|---|---|---|---|---|
| Independent | Waghmare Dhondiram Ganapati | 38,490 | 38.95% | New |
| Independent | Sonavane Vishnu Tatoba | 36,036 | 36.47% | New |
| SS | Sonawane Haridas Krishna | 9,424 | 9.54% | New |
| JD | Tupe Dilip Ramchandra | 7,405 | 7.49% | New |
| Independent | Mane Ajitkumar Anandrao | 3,455 | 3.50% | New |
| Independent | Mhaske Kamal Tukaram | 1,533 | 1.55% | New |
| Independent | Saratapa Mahadeo Sopan | 1,054 | 1.07% | New |
| Margin of victory | | 2,454 | 2.48% | ▼8.83 |
| Turnout | | 100,940 | 60.29% | ▲1.90 |
| Total valid votes | | 98,809 | | |
| Registered electors | | 167,434 | | ▲26.06 |
| Independent gain from IC(S) | | Swing | ▼15.22 | |

=== Assembly Election 1985 ===
1985 Maharashtra Legislative Assembly election : Man
| Party | Candidate | Votes | % | ±% |
|---|---|---|---|---|
| IC(S) | Sonavane Vishnu Tatoba | 41,092 | 54.17% | New |
| INC | Mane Gundopant Balaji | 32,513 | 42.86% | New |
| Independent | Mane Popatrao Gulabrao | 1,248 | 1.65% | New |
| Margin of victory | | 8,579 | 11.31% | ▲4.85 |
| Turnout | | 77,486 | 58.34% | ▲2.40 |
| Total valid votes | | 75,858 | | |
| Registered electors | | 132,825 | | ▲11.57 |
| IC(S) gain from INC(U) | | Swing | ▲4.57 | |

=== Assembly Election 1980 ===
1980 Maharashtra Legislative Assembly election : Man
| Party | Candidate | Votes | % | ±% |
|---|---|---|---|---|
| INC(U) | Sonavane Vishnu Tatoba | 32,307 | 49.60% | New |
| INC(I) | Mane Gundopant Balaji | 28,101 | 43.14% | ▲33.81 |
| JP | Lawangare Nitin Jagnnath | 1,096 | 1.68% | ▼29.82 |
| BJP | Bhosale Bapurao Shivaram | 956 | 1.47% | New |
| Independent | Gaikwad Nivaruti Balvant | 850 | 1.30% | New |
| RPI | Jawale Balasaheb Tatyaba | 801 | 1.23% | New |
| Independent | Dupate Raghunath Balvant | 484 | 0.74% | New |
| Margin of victory | | 4,206 | 6.46% | ▼12.68 |
| Turnout | | 67,107 | 56.37% | ▼1.29 |
| Total valid votes | | 65,137 | | |
| Registered electors | | 119,050 | | ▲7.02 |
| INC(U) gain from INC | | Swing | ▼1.03 | |

=== Assembly Election 1978 ===
1978 Maharashtra Legislative Assembly election : Man
| Party | Candidate | Votes | % | ±% |
|---|---|---|---|---|
| INC | Sonavane Vishnu Tatoba | 31,541 | 50.63% | ▼21.23 |
| JP | Lavangare Nitin Jagannath | 19,622 | 31.50% | New |
| INC(I) | Bhingerdeve Jijaba Tukaram | 5,811 | 9.33% | New |
| Independent | Bhosale Bapurao Shivram | 3,096 | 4.97% | New |
| Independent | Dupate Raghunathrao Balavant | 1,197 | 1.92% | New |
| Independent | Shinde Shankarrao Dadu | 1,028 | 1.65% | New |
| Margin of victory | | 11,919 | 19.13% | ▼39.60 |
| Turnout | | 64,566 | 58.04% | ▲17.22 |
| Total valid votes | | 62,295 | | |
| Registered electors | | 111,236 | | ▲2.40 |
| INC hold | | Swing | ▼21.23 | |

=== Assembly Election 1972 ===
1972 Maharashtra Legislative Assembly election : Man
| Party | Candidate | Votes | % | ±% |
|---|---|---|---|---|
| INC | Prabhawati G Shinde | 30,271 | 71.86% | ▲15.92 |
| Independent | Bhosale Bapurao Shiwaram | 5,528 | 13.12% | New |
| RPI | Kharat Dinkar Tatya | 3,397 | 8.06% | ▼20.89 |
| ABJS | Pol Sarjerao Nanasaheb | 1,597 | 3.79% | New |
| RPI(K) | Ganpatrao M. Ahiwale | 952 | 2.26% | New |
| Independent | Shankuntala J. Ingale | 381 | 0.90% | New |
| Margin of victory | | 24,743 | 58.74% | ▲31.74 |
| Turnout | | 43,512 | 40.06% | ▼14.53 |
| Total valid votes | | 42,126 | | |
| Registered electors | | 108,629 | | ▲22.00 |
| INC hold | | Swing | ▲15.92 | |

=== Assembly Election 1967 ===
1967 Maharashtra Legislative Assembly election : Man
| Party | Candidate | Votes | % | ±% |
|---|---|---|---|---|
| INC | P. T. Sonawane | 26,554 | 55.94% | ▼22.18 |
| RPI | G. B. Mane | 13,741 | 28.95% | ▲16.06 |
| Independent | V. H. Shinde | 3,934 | 8.29% | New |
| Independent | N. B. Mane | 3,237 | 6.82% | New |
| Margin of victory | | 12,813 | 26.99% | ▼38.25 |
| Turnout | | 52,129 | 58.54% | ▲7.29 |
| Total valid votes | | 47,466 | | |
| Registered electors | | 89,043 | | ▲30.02 |
| INC hold | | Swing | ▼22.18 | |

=== Assembly Election 1962 ===
1962 Maharashtra Legislative Assembly election : Man
| Party | Candidate | Votes | % | ±% |
|---|---|---|---|---|
| INC | Laxman Babaji Bhingardeve | 24,624 | 78.13% | New |
| RPI | Khanderao Sakharam Savant | 4,061 | 12.88% | New |
| Independent | Gundopant Balaji Mane | 1,891 | 6.00% | New |
| Independent | Koyana Krishna Khade | 942 | 2.99% | New |
| Margin of victory | | 20,563 | 65.24% | |
| Turnout | | 33,721 | 49.24% | |
| Total valid votes | | 31,518 | | |
| Registered electors | | 68,485 | | |
| INC win (new seat) | | | | |

== See also ==
- List of constituencies of Maharashtra Legislative Assembly
- Man
