= Karmala Assembly constituency =

Constituency of the Maharashtra legislative assembly in India

Coordinates: 18.407°N 75.194°E

Karmala
- Constituency No. 244 for the Maharashtra Legislative Assembly

Constituency details
- Country: India
- Region: Western India
- State: Maharashtra
- District: Solapur
- Lok Sabha constituency: Madha
- Established: 1951
- Total electors: 329,461
- Reservation: None

Member of Legislative Assembly
- 15th Maharashtra Legislative Assembly
- Incumbent Narayan Patil
- Party: NCP-SP
- Alliance: MVA
- Elected year: 2024

Karmala Assembly constituency is one of the 288 Vidhan Sabha (legislative assembly) constituencies of Maharashtra state in western India.

== Overview ==
Karmala (constituency number 244) is one of the eleven Vidhan Sabha constituencies located in the Solapur district. It covers the entire Karmala tehsil and part of the Madha tehsil of this district. The number of electors in 2009 was 250,527 (male 132,006, female 118,521).

Karmala is part of the Madha Lok Sabha constituency along with five other Vidhan Sabha segments, namely Madha, Sangola and Malshiras in the Solapur district and Phaltan and Man in the Satara district.

== Members of the Legislative Assembly ==
Election	Member	Party
1952	Namdeo Mahadeo Jagtap	Indian National Congress
1962	Pandurang Mahadeo Jagtap	Independent politician
1967	K. G. Kamble	Indian National Congress
1972	Tayappa Hari Sonawane	Indian National Congress
1978	Namdeo Mahadeo Jagtap	Indian National Congress
1980	Namdeo Mahadeo Jagtap	Indian National Congress
1985	Patil Raosaheb Bhagwanrao	Independent politician
1990	Jaywantrao Namdeorao Jagtap	Independent politician
1995	Bagal Digambar Murlidhar	Independent politician
1999	Begal Digambarrao Murlidhar	Independent politician
2004	Jaywantrao Namdeorao Jagtap	Shiv Sena
2009	Bagal Shamal Digambar	Nationalist Congress Party
2014	Narayan Govindrao Patil	Shiv Sena
2019	Sanjaymama Vitthalrao Shinde	Independent politician
2024	Narayan Govindrao Patil	Nationalist Congress Party – Sharadchandra Pawar

== Election results ==
=== Assembly Election 2024 ===
2024 Maharashtra Legislative Assembly election : Karmala
Party	Candidate	Votes	%	±%
NCP-SP	Narayan Govindrao Patil	96,091	41.72%	New
Independent	Sanjaymama Vitthalrao Shinde	80,006	34.74%	New
SS	Digvijay Digambarrao Bagal	40,834	17.73%	▼7.24
Independent	Ramdas Madhukar Zol	4,791	2.08%	New
New Rashtriya Samaj Party	Ashok Dnyanadev Waghmode	3,962	1.72%	New
BSP	Sanjay Vaman Shinde	1,525	0.66%	▲0.27
NOTA	None of the above	995	0.43%	▼0.32
Margin of victory		16,085	6.98%	▲4.41
Turnout		231,310	70.21%	▼0.84
Total valid votes		230,315		
Registered electors		329,461		▲8.80
NCP-SP gain from Independent		Swing	▲4.80	

=== Assembly Election 2019 ===
2019 Maharashtra Legislative Assembly election : Karmala
Party	Candidate	Votes	%	±%
Independent	Sanjaymama Vitthalrao Shinde	78,822	36.92%	New
Independent	Narayan Govindrao Patil	73,328	34.35%	New
SS	Bagal Rashmi Digambar	53,295	24.97%	▼5.08
VBA	Atul (Bhau) Bhairavnath Khupase	4,468	2.09%	New
NOTA	None of the above	1,597	0.75%	▲0.39
NCP	Patil Sanjay Krishnarao	1,391	0.65%	▼29.27
Margin of victory		5,494	2.57%	▲2.44
Turnout		215,158	71.05%	▼1.68
Total valid votes		213,474		
Registered electors		302,816		▲8.24
Independent gain from SS		Swing	▲6.87	

=== Assembly Election 2014 ===
2014 Maharashtra Legislative Assembly election : Karmala
Party	Candidate	Votes	%	±%
SS	Narayan Govindrao Patil	60,674	30.05%	▲21.75
NCP	Bagal Rashmee Digambar	60,417	29.92%	▼12.73
SWP	Sanjaymama Vitthalrao Shinde	58,377	28.91%	New
INC	Jaywantrao Namdevrao Jagtap	14,348	7.11%	New
Independent	Shinde Sanjay Mahadev	2,000	0.99%	New
NOTA	None of the above	734	0.36%	New
Margin of victory		257	0.13%	▼16.59
Turnout		203,462	72.73%	▲6.16
Total valid votes		201,940		
Registered electors		279,760		▲11.67
SS gain from NCP		Swing	▼12.60	

=== Assembly Election 2009 ===
2009 Maharashtra Legislative Assembly election : Karmala
Party	Candidate	Votes	%	±%
NCP	Bagal Shamal Digambar	70,943	42.65%	▼3.72
JSS	Narayan (Aaba) Patil	43,126	25.92%	New
SP	Jaywantrao Namdeorao Jagtap	25,491	15.32%	▲13.53
SS	Patil Suryakant Ramkrushna	13,815	8.30%	▼40.93
Independent	Lalasaheb Ajinath Mastud	2,578	1.55%	New
Independent	Ha. Bha. Pa. Khatmode Kalyan Chandrasen	2,525	1.52%	New
MNS	Jagtap Chintamani (Dada) Namdeorao	2,088	1.26%	New
BSP	Kadam Rajabhau Bhimrao	1,734	1.04%	▼0.23
Margin of victory		27,817	16.72%	▲13.86
Turnout		166,767	66.57%	▼13.20
Total valid votes		166,356		
Registered electors		250,527		▲56.87
NCP gain from SS		Swing	▼6.58	

=== Assembly Election 2004 ===
2004 Maharashtra Legislative Assembly election : Karmala
Party	Candidate	Votes	%	±%
SS	Jaywantrao Namdeorao Jagtap	62,692	49.23%	New
NCP	Bagal Digambar Murlidhar	59,052	46.37%	▲33.79
SP	Shinde Adv. Savita Balkrishna	2,279	1.79%	New
Rashtriya Samajik Nayak Paksha	Shinde Ajinath Raghunath	1,713	1.35%	New
BSP	Kadam Rajendra Bhima	1,615	1.27%	New
Margin of victory		3,640	2.86%	▲2.17
Turnout		127,395	79.77%	▲2.73
Total valid votes		127,351		
Registered electors		159,704		▲17.82
SS gain from Independent		Swing	▲5.18	

=== Assembly Election 1999 ===
1999 Maharashtra Legislative Assembly election : Karmala
Party	Candidate	Votes	%	±%
Independent	Begal Digambarrao Murlidhar	43,787	44.05%	New
INC	Jaywantrao Namdeorao Jagtap	43,106	43.37%	▲3.50
NCP	Narayan Govindrao Patil	12,507	12.58%	New
Margin of victory		681	0.69%	▼3.09
Turnout		104,428	77.04%	▼6.15
Total valid votes		99,400		
Registered electors		135,548		▲5.94
Independent hold		Swing	▲0.40	

=== Assembly Election 1995 ===
1995 Maharashtra Legislative Assembly election : Karmala
Party	Candidate	Votes	%	±%
Independent	Bagal Digambar Murlidhar	45,423	43.65%	New
INC	Jaywantrao Namdeorao Jagtap	41,485	39.87%	▲14.41
SS	Mangale Shivaji Eknath	15,826	15.21%	▼2.35
Hindustan Janta Party	Bhosale Baburao Ganapat	733	0.70%	New
Margin of victory		3,938	3.78%	▼14.81
Turnout		106,435	83.19%	▲17.95
Total valid votes		104,056		
Registered electors		127,947		▲0.69
Independent hold		Swing	▼0.41	

=== Assembly Election 1990 ===
1990 Maharashtra Legislative Assembly election : Karmala
Party	Candidate	Votes	%	±%
Independent	Jaywantrao Namdeorao Jagtap	35,762	44.06%	New
INC	Patil Raosaheb Bhagwanrao	20,670	25.46%	▼12.06
SS	Zanpure Padmakar Vishwanath	14,251	17.56%	New
JD	Patil Ramrao Sahebrao	9,803	12.08%	New
Margin of victory		15,092	18.59%	▲2.06
Turnout		82,905	65.24%	▲0.81
Total valid votes		81,171		
Registered electors		127,076		▲25.26
Independent hold		Swing	▼10.00	

=== Assembly Election 1985 ===
1985 Maharashtra Legislative Assembly election : Karmala
Party	Candidate	Votes	%	±%
Independent	Patil Raosaheb Bhagwanrao	34,511	54.06%	New
INC	Namadeorao Mahadeorao Jagtap	23,956	37.52%	New
JP	Kumar Saptarshi	3,027	4.74%	New
Independent	Ajinath Shrikrishan Kalekar	2,203	3.45%	New
Margin of victory		10,555	16.53%	▲6.29
Turnout		65,362	64.43%	▲0.06
Total valid votes		63,844		
Registered electors		101,450		▲10.86
Independent gain from INC(U)		Swing	▲19.03	

=== Assembly Election 1980 ===
1980 Maharashtra Legislative Assembly election : Karmala
Party	Candidate	Votes	%	±%
INC(U)	Namdeo Mahadeo Jagtap	20,006	35.03%	New
Independent	Zanpure Padmakar Vishwanath	14,157	24.79%	New
Independent	Devi Girdhadas Vithaldas	12,952	22.68%	New
INC(I)	Doshi. R. B	9,340	16.35%	▲15.60
Independent	Shinde. D. D	654	1.15%	New
Margin of victory		5,849	10.24%	▲2.86
Turnout		58,909	64.37%	▼9.74
Total valid votes		57,109		
Registered electors		91,510		▲7.85
INC(U) gain from INC		Swing	▼16.91	

=== Assembly Election 1978 ===
1978 Maharashtra Legislative Assembly election : Karmala
Party	Candidate	Votes	%	±%
INC	Namdeo Mahadeo Jagtap	31,589	51.94%	▼19.30
JP	Devi Girdhadas Vithaldas	27,101	44.56%	New
PWPI	Randive Dadasaheb Shridhar	1,563	2.57%	New
INC(I)	Raut Udhavrao Abaji	458	0.75%	New
Margin of victory		4,488	7.38%	▼39.22
Turnout		62,882	74.11%	▲30.61
Total valid votes		60,821		
Registered electors		84,847		▲12.68
INC hold		Swing	▼19.30	

=== Assembly Election 1972 ===
1972 Maharashtra Legislative Assembly election : Karmala
Party	Candidate	Votes	%	±%
INC	Tayappa Hari Sonawane	22,454	71.24%	▲13.20
RPI(K)	Kamble Ramchandra Maruti	7,767	24.64%	New
Independent	Kamble Basu Bhikaji	683	2.17%	New
Independent	Jadhav Keru Ramachandra	613	1.94%	New
Margin of victory		14,687	46.60%	▲26.02
Turnout		32,756	43.50%	▼12.48
Total valid votes		31,517		
Registered electors		75,302		▲12.05
INC hold		Swing	▲13.20	

=== Assembly Election 1967 ===
1967 Maharashtra Legislative Assembly election : Karmala
Party	Candidate	Votes	%	±%
INC	K. G. Kamble	20,542	58.04%	▲24.12
RPI	R. S. Ranshrungare	13,259	37.46%	New
Independent	P. G. Chinde	665	1.88%	New
SWA	K. B. Randive	663	1.87%	New
Independent	S. T. Bagade	266	0.75%	New
Margin of victory		7,283	20.58%	▲17.63
Turnout		37,620	55.98%	▼3.64
Total valid votes		35,395		
Registered electors		67,201		▼11.41
INC gain from Independent		Swing	▲21.18	

=== Assembly Election 1962 ===
1962 Maharashtra Legislative Assembly election : Karmala
Party	Candidate	Votes	%	±%
Independent	Pandurang Mahadeo Jagtap	15,543	36.86%	New
INC	Namdeo Mahadeo Jagtap	14,300	33.92%	▼16.98
PWPI	Sampatrao Maruti Patil	11,296	26.79%	▼2.66
Independent	Ambadas Anant Wajale	1,023	2.43%	New
Margin of victory		1,243	2.95%	▼18.50
Turnout		45,226	59.62%	▲14.23
Total valid votes		42,162		
Registered electors		75,855		▲91.65
Independent gain from INC		Swing	▼14.04	

=== Assembly Election 1952 ===
1952 Bombay State Legislative Assembly election : Karmala
Party	Candidate	Votes	%	±%
INC	Namdeo Mahadeo Jagtap	9,143	50.90%	New
PWPI	Patil Ganpat Eknath	5,290	29.45%	New
Socialist	Chiwate Manohar Ganpat	2,701	15.04%	New
Independent	Kavadi Bhikaji Laxman	830	4.62%	New
Margin of victory		3,853	21.45%	
Turnout		17,964	45.39%	
Total valid votes		17,964		
Registered electors		39,579		
INC win (new seat)				

== See also ==
- Karmala
- List of constituencies of Maharashtra Vidhan Sabha
