= Malshiras =

- Town, Taluka
- Location in Maharashtra, India
- Coordinates: 17.92°N 74.95°E
- Country: India
- State: Maharashtra
- District: Solapur

Languages
  - Official: Marathi
- Time zone: UTC+5:30 (IST)
- Telephone code: 02185
- Vehicle registration: MH-45
- Coastline: 0 kilometres (0 mi)
- Nearest city: Akluj
- Climate: Dry and hot (Köppen)
- Avg. summer temperature: 45 °C (113 °F)
- Avg. winter temperature: 12 °C (54 °F)

Malshiras is a town and the headquarters of Malshiras taluka in Solapur district of Maharashtra state in western India. Its governing body was promoted to Nagar Panchayat from a Gram Panchayat in 2017. There are many popular towns in Malshiras taluka such as Akluj, Natepute, Mahalung (for famous Yamai Devi temple), Malinagar, Velapur (for famous Ardhnari Nateshwar temple) and popular Villages like Rajapur (Islampur) Goradwadi, Bhamburdi, Medad and Palasmandal. Rajapur (Islampur) is adjacent to Malshiras which has good literacy rate and having historic samadhi mandir of Santaji Ghorpade.

This taluka headquarters has a post and telegraph office, Gram-panchayat and panchayat samiti, Primary health center monitored by Zilla-parishad, Solapur. Generally, wells are the main source of water-supply. Primary schools conducted by the Zilla Parishad and one high school known as the Gopalrao Dev Prashala and Jr. College cater to the educational needs of the town populace.

A weekly open market is held on every Thursday. There is one movie theatre near canal no. 58.

The Hanumaan temple (town god) near the natural canal is especially famous one.

The current representative of Malshiras Assembly constituency in the Maharashtra Legislative Assembly is Uttamrao Jankar

== Transportation ==
Malshiras is on the road connecting Mahad-Pandharpur and Pune- Pandharpur(Palkhi Mahamarg). Malshiras is well-connected by MSRTC buses to all the major cities in Maharashtra. The nearest train station is Pandharpur.

It is situated near the border of Pune, Satara and Solapur districts. The nearby places to visit are Pandharpur, Akluj, Baramati. Malshiras is one of the stops for Sant Dnyaneshwar Maharaj Palakhi which travels annually from Alandi to Pandharpur. Other towns in Malshiras taluka which are the stops for the Palakhi are Natepute and Velapur.

Highest Peak in Solapur district is Sukhi AAI Temple which is located in Goradwadi village near border of Garvad in Malshiras taluka.

== Economy ==
Malshiras' economy is driven by agriculture. Most of the population is living on agriculture. Daily transport of their products such as vegetables, grains, and flowers, along with other products, are nowadays done by private vehicles that run the trips to the city of Pune and get earnings for the farmers. Many of the farmers are now approaching modern technology, be it dripping or equipped with the latest tools and techniques to get the maximum use of the resources. Many are staying outstations to earn incomes for their families and rest of the family members are cultivating fields.

Majority of the people rely on water which is available in the wells and canals and their sub-canals. It has five Sugar factories located nearby town named Sadashivnagar, Yashwant Nagar in Akluj, chandapuri sugar factory Pandurang sugar factory in Mahalung-shreepur and last one in Malinagar.

== Mandave Village ==
Mandave is a village positioned in Malshiras Block of Solapur district in Maharashtra. Located in rural region of Solapur district of Maharashtra, it is one of the 114 villages of Malshiras Block of Solapur district. According to the administration records, the village number of Mandave is 562427. The village has 1519 homes.

Population of Mandave village According to Census 2011, Mandave's population is 7883. Out of this, 4122 are males while the females count 3761 here. This village has 971 kids in the age group of 0–6 years. Out of this 527 are boys and 444 are girls.

Literacy rate of Mandave village Literacy rate in Mandave village is 64%. 5101 out of total 7883 population is literate here. In males the literacy rate is 71% as 2939 males out of total 4122 are literate while female literacy rate is 57% as 2162 out of total 3761 females are literate in this Village.
