= Akluj Fort =

Fort in Solapur, Maharashtra, India

- अकलूज किल्ला
- Solapur district, Maharashtra

Site information
- Type: Hill fort
- Owner: Government of India
- Controlled by: India (1947-)
- Open to the public: Yes
- Condition: Good

Location
- Shown within Maharashtra Akluj Fort (India)
- Coordinates: 17°53′39.1″N 75°01′21.7″E
- Height: 1,598 ft (487 m)

Site history
- Materials: Stone

This fort was built by Yadav king Raja Singhan in the 13th century. In that period, this fort was completely destroyed in the war. The history of this fort is not very long and its middle history almost vanished in that period. In history that mentioned (In Moghal period it was also known as Asadnagar) Sambhaji along with 26 others was captured by Mukarrab Khan from Sangameshwar and brought to this fort

The fort was ruled by Bahmani Kingdom, Sultanate of Bijapur, Mughal Empire, and Maratha Empire. During mughal period, fort Bahadurgarh and this fort are used to rule by Aurangzeb's subhedar Bahadur Khan of Deccan. Later it is mentioned that Ranmastkhan become the killedar. In 1679, Diler Khan and Sambhaji Maharaj lived for 4 months. Aurangzeb stayed in this fort from 14 December 1688 to 15 February 1689. In that period, Maharashtra Gazetteer that changed to asadpur for celebrating happiness when he came to know that were Chatrapati Sambhaji maharaj was captured by Mukkarrabkhan at Sangmeshwar. History also mentions that Baji Rao II were lived for three month's after British overthrew the peshava. Apart from this, it is also recorded that, the British governor Lord Dalhousie also stayed here for some time.

Akluj Fort ( Marathi: अकलूज किल्ला ) is a fort located 115km from Solapur, in Solapur district, of Maharashtra. This fort is an important fort in Solapur district. The fort restoration is done by the Shree Dinkarrao Thopte and Avinash Thopte with the help of local people. The fort is now also called Shiv shrushti.

== History ==
The history is mentioned under the Akluj Town. Sambhaji Maharaj along with 26 others was captured by Mukarrab Khan from Sangameshwar and brought to this fort

== How to reach ==
The nearest town is Solapur. The Fort is open to the public from 10 am to 6 pm. It is located on the banks of the river Nira. Nearest Airport is Pune at 170 km (approx).

== Places to see ==
Inside the fort are various idols made from fibre depicting life of Shivaji Maharaj. It takes about an hour to visit all places on the fort. This is one of the well maintained fort in Maharashtra.

== See also ==
- List of forts in Maharashtra
- List of forts in India
- Sambhaji Maharaj
- Marathi People
- List of Maratha dynasties and states
- Maratha War of Independence
- Maratha Army
- Maratha titles
- Military history of India
- Akluj
