= Vijaysinh Mohite–Patil =

Indian politician (born 1944)

Vijaysinh Shankarao Mohite-Patil
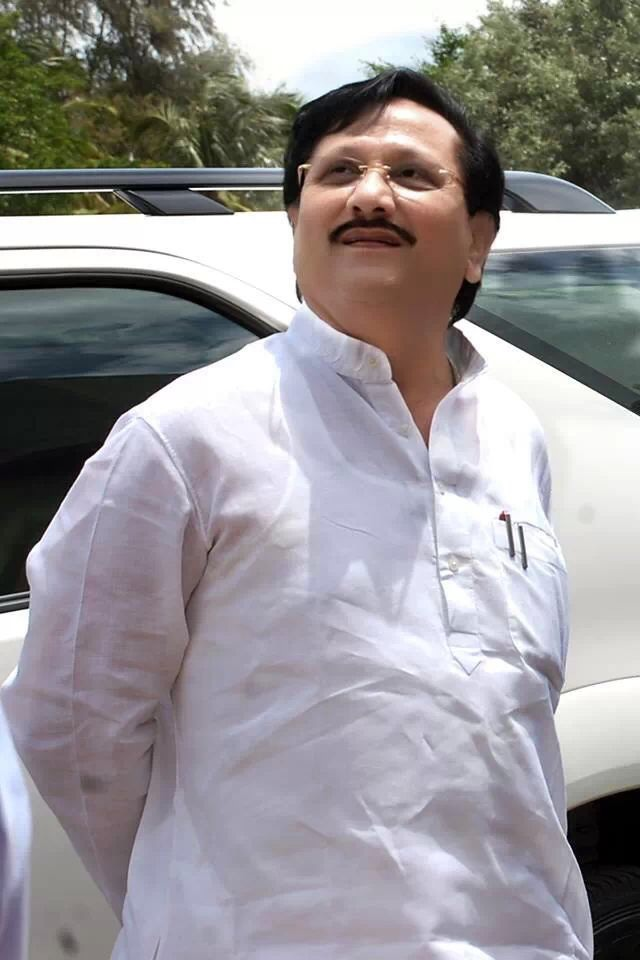

Member of Parliament, Lok Sabha
- In office 16 May 2014 – 19 May 2019
- Preceded by: Sharad Pawar
- Succeeded by: Ranjit Naik-Nimbalkar
- Constituency: Madha

6th Deputy Chief Minister of Maharashtra
- In office 27 December 2003 – 19 October 2004
- Governor: Mohammed Fazal
- Chief Minister: Sushilkumar Shinde
- Preceded by: Chhagan Bhujbal
- Succeeded by: R R Patil

Cabinet Minister Government of Maharashtra
- In office 9 November 2004 – 1 December 2008
- Minister: Rural Development; Tourism
- Governor: Mohammed Fazal; S. M. Krishna; S. C. Jamir
- Chief Minister: Vilasrao Deshmukh
- Preceded by: -
- Succeeded by: -
- In office 19 October 1999 – 16 January 2003
- Minister: Public Works Department
- Governor: P. C. Alexander; Mohammed Fazal
- Chief Minister: Vilasrao Deshmukh
- Preceded by: Nitin Gadkari
- Succeeded by: Chhagan Bhujbal

Member of Legislative Council Maharashtra
- In office 4 May 2012 – 16 May 2014
- Constituency: Nominated by Governor

Member of Legislative Assembly Maharashtra
- In office (1980-1985), (1985-1990), (1990-1995), (1995-1999), (1999-2004), (2004 – 2009)
- Preceded by: Shamrao Bhimrao patil
- Succeeded by: Hanumant Dolas
- Constituency: Malshiras

Personal details
- Born: 12 June 1944 (age 82)
- Party: Nationalist Congress Party (Sharadchandra Pawar)
- Relatives: Rajsinh Mohite Patil, Jaysinh Mohite Patil, Madansinh Mohite Patil, Pratapsinh Mohite Patil, Udaysinh Mohite Patil
- Occupation: Politician

Vijaysinh Shankarao Mohite-Patil (born 12 June 1944) is a politician from the Nationalist Congress Party and Member of Parliament (MP) for Madha in Maharashtra since the 2014 general election till the 2019 general election. He is member of Nationalist Congress Party.

Prior to that he served as the Deputy Chief Minister of Maharashtra. He was also a Minister for Public Works Department (PWD) and Tourism and Rural Development for over 25 years.

== Political career ==
Mohite-Patil started his career as Sarpanch of Akluj in Solapur district. He served as President of Solapur Zila Parishad from 1971 to 1979, and was MLA representing Malshiras from 1980 to 2009. In that time he established sugar factories, milk dairies and processing industries, poultry farms, schools, nursing, engineering and D.Ed College in Malshiras. On 25 December 2003 he was sworn in as the Deputy Chief Minister of Maharashtra. He has served as a cabinet Minister of PWD, Tourism and Rural Development Ministry.

In the 2009 Maharashtra assembly elections, his constituency Malshiras became a Reserved Seat, forcing him to shift to the neighbouring Pandharpur seat. He was defeated in the elections that followed by Bharat Bhalke. NCP president Sharad Pawar eventually named him president of the Maharashtra State Co-operative Sugar Factories Federation. In the 2014 Lok Sabha election, he was elected as Member of Parliament from Madha constituency.

== Positions held ==
- Akluj Gram Panchayat- Member, Sarpanch
- Solapur Zilla Parishad- Member, President (From 1971 to 1979)
- Minister of PWD
- Minister of Tourism
- Minister of Rural Development
- Chairman- Ethanol Manufacturers association of India.
- Chairman- Maharashtra Rajya Sakhar Sangh (State Sugar Cooperatives Federation)
- 1980-1985 - MLA, Independent (Malshiras)
- 1985-1990 - MLA, INC (Malshiras)
- 1990-1995 - MLA, INC (Malshiras)
- 1995-1999 - MLA, INC (Malshiras)
- 1999-2004 - MLA, NCP (Malshiras) DCM. (27 Dec 2003 – 19 Oct 2004)
- 2004-2009 - MLA, NCP (Malshiras)
- 2012-2014 - MLC, Nominated by Governor (4 May 2012 – 16 May 2014)
- 2014-2019 - MP – NCP (Madha) (2014 – 2019)
- 2024 - Director - National Federation of Cooperative Sugar Factories Limited

== Family ==
He and his wife Nandinidevi have a son Ranjitsinh Mohite-Patil and a daughter Renuka Mohite Patil-Karnik.

Vijaysinh's wedding in 1971 attracted a lot of controversy and criticism due to having Laksh Bhoj during a period of severe drought in Maharashtra.

== See also ==
- Sundarrao Solanke-Patil
- Vilasrao Deshmukh
- Sharad Pawar
- Bharat Bhalke
- Hanumant Dolas

Preceded by Chhagan Bhujbal	Deputy Chief Minister of Maharashtra; 25 December 2003 – 1 November 2004	Succeeded by R. R. Patil
Preceded by R. R. Patil	Rural Development Minister; 1 November 2004 – 9 October 2009	Succeeded by Jayant Patil
