= Babasaheb Deshmukh =

Indian politician

Member of the Maharashtra Legislative Assembly
- Incumbent
- Assumed office 2024
- Preceded by: Shahajibapu Patil
- Constituency: Sangola

Personal details
- Born: 3 January 1987 (age 39) Penur, Mohol, Solapur District
- Party: Peasants and Workers Party of India
- Relatives: Ganpathrao Deshmukh (Grandfather)

Babasaheb Annasaheb Deshmukh (born 3 Jan 1987), is an Indian politician from Maharashtra. He is a member of the Maharashtra Legislative Assembly from Sangole Assembly constituency in Solapur district. He won the 2024 Maharashtra Legislative Assembly election representing the Peasants and Workers Party of India.

== Early life and education ==
Deshmukh is from Sangola, Solapur district, Maharashtra. He is the grandson of Ganpathrao Deshmukh, a former 11 time MLA from Sangola and son of Annasaheb. He completed his M.B.B.S. in 2011 at M.U.H.S., Nashik Government Medical College, Aurangabad and later did his M.D. in general medicine in 2017 at Dr. D. Y. Patil Medical College, Hospital & Research Centre, Kolhapur. He is a practicing cardiologist. After winning the seat, he promised to plant 25,000 trees in the constituency.

== Career ==
Deshmukh won from Sangola Assembly constituency representing Peasants and Workers Party in the 2024 Maharashtra Legislative Assembly election. He polled 116,256 votes and defeated his nearest rival, Shahajibapu Rajaram Patil of the Shiva Sena, by a margin of 25,386 votes.
