= Phaltan Assembly constituency =

Constituency of the Maharashtra legislative assembly in India

Coordinates: 17.99°N 74.43°E

Phaltan
- Constituency No. 255 for the Maharashtra Legislative Assembly

Constituency details
- Country: India
- Region: Western India
- State: Maharashtra
- District: Satara
- Lok Sabha constituency: Madha
- Established: 1955
- Total electors: 340,608
- Reservation: SC

Member of Legislative Assembly
- 15th Maharashtra Legislative Assembly
- Incumbent Sachin Patil
- Party: NCP
- Alliance: NDA
- Elected year: 2024

Phaltan Assembly constituency of Maharashtra Vidhan Sabha is one of the constituencies located in Satara district. This constituency presently, after the delimitation of Legislative Assembly constituencies in 2008, is reserved for the candidates belonging to the SC.

It is a part of Madha Lok Sabha constituency, along with five other assembly constituencies, namely Man in Satara district and Karmala, Madha, Sangole, Malsiras in Solapur district.

== Members of the Legislative Assembly ==
Year	Member	Party
1957	Haribhau Nimbalkar	Communist Party of India
1957	Sadashivrao Bandisode	Scheduled Castes Federation
1962	Malojiraje Naik Nimbalkar	Indian National Congress
1967	Krishnachandra Bhoite	Indian National Congress
1972	Krishnachandra Bhoite	Indian National Congress
1978	Vijaysinhraje Naik Nimbalkar	Janata Party
1980	Suryajirao Kadam	Indian National Congress (U)
1985	Suryajirao Kadam	Independent
1990	Suryajirao Kadam	Indian National Congress
1995	Ramraje Naik Nimbalkar	Independent
1999	Ramraje Naik Nimbalkar	Nationalist Congress Party
2004	Ramraje Naik Nimbalkar	Nationalist Congress Party
2009	Dipak Chavan	Nationalist Congress Party
2014	Dipak Chavan	Nationalist Congress Party
2019	Dipak Chavan	Nationalist Congress Party
2024	Sachin Patil	Nationalist Congress Party

== Election results ==
=== Assembly Election 2024 ===
2024 Maharashtra Legislative Assembly election: Phaltan
Party	Candidate	Votes	%	±%
NCP	Sachin Patil	119,287	49.08%	New
NCP-SP	Dipak Pralhad Chavan	1,02,241	42.06%	New
RSPS	Digamber Rohidas Agawane	13,828	5.69%	New
Sanay Chatrapati Shasan	Deepak Chavan	2,157	0.89%	New
SWP	Prof. Adhav Ramesh Tukaram	1,933	0.80%	New
NOTA	None of the Above	1,502	0.62%	▼0.18
Margin of victory		17,046	7.01%	▼7.47
Turnout		2,44,571	71.80%	▲7.07
Total valid votes		2,43,069		
Registered electors		3,40,608		▲2.39
NCP gain from NCP		Swing	▼5.91	

=== Assembly Election 2019 ===
2019 Maharashtra Legislative Assembly election : Phaltan
Party	Candidate	Votes	%	±%
NCP	Dipak Pralhad Chavan	117,617	54.99%	▲8.30
BJP	Digambar Rohidas Agawane	86,636	40.51%	New
VBA	Arvind Baburao Aadhav	5,460	2.55%	New
NOTA	None of the Above	1,717	0.80%	▼0.03
Margin of victory		30,981	14.48%	▼2.38
Turnout		2,15,987	64.92%	▼0.70
Total valid votes		2,13,887		
Registered electors		3,32,673		▲8.64
NCP hold		Swing	▲8.30	

=== Assembly Election 2014 ===
2014 Maharashtra Legislative Assembly election : Phaltan
Party	Candidate	Votes	%	±%
NCP	Dipak Pralhad Chavan	92,910	46.69%	▼0.27
INC	Digambar Rohidas Agawane	59,342	29.82%	New
SWP	Popatrao Maruti Kakade	24,529	12.33%	New
SS	Dr. Nandkumar Yadavrao Tasgaonkar	15,704	7.89%	▼12.85
NOTA	None of the Above	1,656	0.83%	New
BSP	Prof. Dadasaheb Appaji Gaikwad	1,610	0.81%	New
Margin of victory		33,568	16.87%	▼9.34
Turnout		2,00,659	65.53%	▲9.55
Total valid votes		1,99,001		
Registered electors		3,06,204		▲11.47
NCP hold		Swing	▼0.27	

=== Assembly Election 2009 ===
2009 Maharashtra Legislative Assembly election : Phaltan
Party	Candidate	Votes	%	±%
NCP	Dipak Pralhad Chavan	71,506	46.95%	▼14.73
SS	Baburao Jyotiram Mane	31,592	20.75%	▼10.51
Independent	Kakade Popatrao Maruti	24,672	16.20%	New
RSPS	Aadhav Chandrakant Babanrao	7,695	5.05%	▲1.34
RPI(A)	Amol Gulab Aavale	2,281	1.50%	New
Independent	Laxman Bapu Mane	1,718	1.13%	New
Independent	Namdev Bhiva Khude	1,465	0.96%	New
Margin of victory		39,914	26.21%	▼4.22
Turnout		1,52,367	55.47%	▼12.22
Total valid votes		1,52,287		
Registered electors		2,74,690		▲38.13
NCP hold		Swing	▼14.73	

=== Assembly Election 2004 ===
2004 Maharashtra Legislative Assembly election : Phaltan
Party	Candidate	Votes	%	±%
NCP	Ramraje Naik Nimbalkar	82,996	61.69%	▲8.18
SS	Ranjit Naik-Nimbalkar	42,051	31.25%	▲11.68
RSPS	Dr. Shende Uttamrao Rajaram	4,994	3.71%	New
Lok Rajya Party	Arvind Sambhaji Sul	2,315	1.72%	New
Independent	Shinde Sachin Hanumantrao	2,191	1.63%	New
Margin of victory		40,945	30.43%	▲3.85
Turnout		1,34,565	67.67%	▼3.35
Total valid votes		1,34,547		
Registered electors		1,98,869		▲18.12
NCP hold		Swing	▲8.18	

=== Assembly Election 1999 ===
1999 Maharashtra Legislative Assembly election : Phaltan
Party	Candidate	Votes	%	±%
NCP	Ramraje Naik Nimbalkar	63,960	53.51%	New
INC	Suryajirao Shankarrao alias Chimanrao Kadam	32,180	26.92%	▼5.01
SS	Anandrao Shankarrao Shelke Patil	23,395	19.57%	New
Margin of victory		31,780	26.59%	▼5.41
Turnout		1,25,729	74.68%	▼7.69
Total valid votes		1,19,535		
Registered electors		1,68,356		▼0.14
NCP gain from Independent		Swing	▼10.43	

=== Assembly Election 1995 ===
1995 Maharashtra Legislative Assembly election : Phaltan
Party	Candidate	Votes	%	±%
Independent	Ramraje Naik Nimbalkar	84,816	63.93%	New
INC	Suryajirao Shankarrao alias Chimanrao Kadam	42,367	31.94%	▼16.92
BJP	Vishnu Ramchandra Tripute	3,352	2.53%	▼19.40
CPI	Jagatap Bajirao Appsaheb	1,345	1.01%	New
Margin of victory		42,449	32.00%	▲5.43
Turnout		1,35,257	80.23%	▲8.45
Total valid votes		1,32,665		
Registered electors		1,68,588		▲5.92
Independent gain from INC		Swing	▲15.08	

=== Assembly Election 1990 ===
1990 Maharashtra Legislative Assembly election : Phaltan
Party	Candidate	Votes	%	±%
INC	Suryajirao Shankarrao alias Chimanrao Kadam	54,620	48.85%	▲41.52
Independent	Subhashrao Tukaram Shinde	24,915	22.28%	New
BJP	Vijayrao Kondiram Borawake	24,518	21.93%	New
JD	Subhashchandra Kolape	4,470	4.00%	New
Independent	Metkari Dastagir Kadarbhai	2,401	2.15%	New
Margin of victory		29,705	26.57%	▲14.60
Turnout		1,13,618	71.38%	▼1.64
Total valid votes		1,11,807		
Registered electors		1,59,171		▲27.14
INC gain from Independent		Swing	▼3.11	

=== Assembly Election 1985 ===
1985 Maharashtra Legislative Assembly election : Phaltan
Party	Candidate	Votes	%	±%
Independent	Suryajirao Shankarrao alias Chimanrao Kadam	46,763	51.96%	New
IC(S)	Rajaram Sakharam Bhonsale alias Raja Bhonsale	35,992	39.99%	New
INC	Babasaheb Raghunath More	6,595	7.33%	New
Independent	Kazi Haji Ahmed Salim	558	0.62%	New
Margin of victory		10,771	11.97%	▼20.55
Turnout		91,338	72.96%	▲6.64
Total valid votes		89,993		
Registered electors		1,25,189		▲13.98
Independent gain from INC(U)		Swing	▼12.51	

=== Assembly Election 1980 ===
1980 Maharashtra Legislative Assembly election : Phaltan
Party	Candidate	Votes	%	±%
INC(U)	Suryajirao Shankarrao alias Chimanrao Kadam	46,210	64.48%	New
INC(I)	Hindurao Naik Nimbalkar	22,908	31.96%	▲22.40
BJP	Sarak Rakhamaji Anna	2,550	3.56%	New
Margin of victory		23,302	32.51%	▲30.52
Turnout		73,226	66.67%	▼8.02
Total valid votes		71,668		
Registered electors		1,09,835		▲9.26
INC(U) gain from JP		Swing	▲21.02	

=== Assembly Election 1978 ===
1978 Maharashtra Legislative Assembly election : Phaltan
Party	Candidate	Votes	%	±%
JP	Vijaysinh Alias Shivajiraje Malojirao Naik Nimbalkar	32,011	43.46%	New
INC	Suryajirao Shankarrao Alias Chimanrao Kadam	30,539	41.46%	▼31.44
INC(I)	Madhavrao Bhikaji Dayagude	7,041	9.56%	New
CPI	Pailwan Jagtap Bajirao Bhikaji	2,533	3.44%	▼10.70
Independent	Babar Sambhaji Atmaram	1,530	2.08%	New
Margin of victory		1,472	2.00%	▼56.76
Turnout		76,173	75.77%	▲16.49
Total valid votes		73,654		
Registered electors		1,00,530		▲12.98
JP gain from INC		Swing	▼29.44	

=== Assembly Election 1972 ===
1972 Maharashtra Legislative Assembly election : Phaltan
Party	Candidate	Votes	%	±%
INC	Krishnachandra Bhoite	36,827	72.90%	▲25.7
CPI	Jagtap Bajirao Appaji	7,144	14.14%	▲10.6
ABJS	V. Ramchandra Sonawale	5,500	10.89%	New
CPI(M)	Kirve Vishwanath Nana	1,046	2.07%	New
Margin of victory		29,683	58.76%	▲55.38
Turnout		52,256	58.73%	▼14.37
Total valid votes		50,517		
Registered electors		88,983		▲20.73
INC hold		Swing	▲25.70	

=== Assembly Election 1967 ===
1967 Maharashtra Legislative Assembly election : Phaltan
Party	Candidate	Votes	%	±%
INC	Krishnachandra Bhoite	24,749	47.20%	▼26.89
Independent	V. M. Naiknimbalkar	22,979	43.82%	New
CPI	B. A. Jagtap	1,856	3.54%	▼16.68
Independent	B. A. Kharat	1,136	2.17%	New
Independent	W. V. Pawar	943	1.80%	New
Independent	R. G. Chavan	775	1.48%	New
Margin of victory		1,770	3.38%	▼50.49
Turnout		55,728	75.61%	▲7.11
Total valid votes		52,438		
Registered electors		73,707		▲3.63
INC hold		Swing	▼26.89	

=== Assembly Election 1962 ===
1962 Maharashtra Legislative Assembly election : Phaltan
Party	Candidate	Votes	%	±%
INC	Naik Nimbalkar Malojirao Alias Nanasaheb	33,741	74.08%	▲51.09
CPI	Haribhau Vithal Nimbalkar	9,209	20.22%	▼11.13
SWA	Vishnu Sayaji Kundalkar	2,594	5.70%	New
Margin of victory		24,532	53.86%	▲49.47
Turnout		48,043	67.55%	▼50.87
Total valid votes		45,544		
Registered electors		71,122		▼40.84
INC gain from CPI		Swing	▲42.73	

=== Assembly Election 1957 ===
1957 Bombay State Legislative Assembly election : Phaltan
Party	Candidate	Votes	%	±%
CPI	Nimbalkar Haribhau Vithalrao	43,307	31.35%	New
SCF	Bandisode Sadashivrao Marutirao (Sc)	37,237	26.96%	New
INC	Naik Nimbalkar Malojirao Alias Nanasaheb	31,764	23.00%	New
INC	Ganpatrao Devji Tapase	25,822	18.69%	New
Margin of victory		6,070	4.39%	
Turnout		1,38,130	114.90%	
Total valid votes		1,38,130		
Registered electors		1,20,213		
CPI gain from INC		Swing		

== See also ==
- List of constituencies of Maharashtra Legislative Assembly
- Phaltan
