= Sanjaymama Shinde =

Indian politician

Member of Maharashtra Legislative Assembly
- In office 2019–2024
- Preceded by: Narayan Patil
- Succeeded by: Narayan Patil
- Constituency: Karmala

Personal details
- Party: Independent
- Occupation: Politician

Sanjaymama Vittalrao Shinde is a member of the Maharashtra Legislative Assembly elected from Karmala Assembly constituency in Solapur city. He is an independent.

== Positions held ==
- 2019: Elected to Maharashtra Legislative Assembly.
