= Shahajibapu Patil =

Maharashtra, India politician

Adv. Shahajibapu Patil

Member of Maharashtra Legislative Assembly
- In office 2019–2024
- Preceded by: Ganpatrao Deshmukh
- Succeeded by: Babasaheb Deshmukh
- Constituency: Sangola
- In office 1995–1999
- Preceded by: Ganpatrao Deshmukh
- Succeeded by: Ganpatrao Deshmukh
- Constituency: Sangola

Personal details
- Born: Shahajibapu Rajaram Patil; 25 October 1955 (age 70) Sangola, Solapur District, Maharashtra
- Party: Shiv Sena (2014-Present)
- Other political affiliations: Indian National Congress (Before 2014)

Shahajibapu Rajaram Patil is an Indian politician serving as Member of the Maharashtra Legislative Assembly from Sangola Vidhan Sabha constituency as a member of Shiv Sena. He has a degree in law. He was a member of the Indian National Congress and became MLA for the first time in 1995 after defeating a strong candidate, Ganpatrao Deshmukh of Peasants and Workers Party of India.

He deserted the Shiv Sena during the 2022 Maharashtra political crisis and joined rebel party politician Eknath Shinde. He along with more than 40 MLAs camped in Guwahati. During this time a phone conversation with his follower went viral on social media in which he described the beauty of Radisson Blu Hotel and the scenery of mountains from there.

== Positions held ==
- 1995 : Elected to Maharashtra Legislative Assembly
- 2019: Elected to Maharashtra Legislative Assembly
