= Hanumant Dolas =

Indian politician (1962–2019)

Member of Maharashtra Legislative Assembly
- In office (2009-2014), (2014 – 2019)
- Preceded by: Vijaysinh Mohite–Patil
- Succeeded by: Ram Satpute
- Constituency: Malsiras

Personal details
- Born: 1 June 1962 Akluj, Solapur District
- Died: 30 April 2019 (aged 56) Mumbai, Maharashtra
- Party: Nationalist Congress Party
- Spouse: Kanchantai Hanumantrao Dolas
- Children: Sankalp Hanumantrao Dolas- General Secretary Nationalist Youth Congress & Siddhi Hanumantrao Dolas
- Occupation: Politician

Hanumantrao Jagannath Dolas (1 June 1962 – 30 April 2019) was an Indian politician from Nationalist Congress Party and 2 times Member of Maharashtra Legislative Assembly From Malshiras. He was the chairman of state-run Sant Rohidas Leather Industries and Charmakar Development Corporation Limited. Later, he was also appointed as the director of Maharashtra Housing and Area Development Authority.
