= Dipak Pralhad Chavan =

Indian politician

Member of Maharashtra Legislative Assembly
- In office (2009-2014), (2014-2019), (2019 – 2024)
- Preceded by: Ramraje Naik Nimbalkar
- Succeeded by: Sachin Patil
- Constituency: Phaltan

Personal details
- Party: Shiv Sena (2025-Present)
- Other political affiliations: Nationalist Congress Party (before 2025)
- Occupation: Politician

Dipak Pralhad Chavan is a leader of Nationalist Congress Party and a member of the Maharashtra Legislative Assembly elected from Phaltan Assembly constituency in Satara city.

== Positions held ==
- 2019: Elected to Maharashtra Legislative Assembly.
