= Madha Taluka =

- Tehsil
- Interactive map of Madha Taluka
- Country: India
- State: Maharashtra
- District: Solapur District
- Headquarters: Madha

Area
  - Total: 1,544.9 km^{2} (596.5 sq mi)

Population (2001 census)
  - Total: 292,611
  - Density: 189.40/km^{2} (490.56/sq mi)
  - Sex ratio: 922
- ISO 3166 code: IN-MH
- Villages: 117
- Revenue circles: 7
- Average rainfall: 519 mm

Madha Taluka is one of the 11 tehsils of Solapur District in the Indian state of Maharashtra.

As of 2001, the tehsil population was 292,611.

== City and villages ==
The city of Madha is the seat of the tehsil. In addition, Madha Taluka comprises more than 100 villages, among which

- Barloni
- Laul

== See also ==
- Sahyadri Tiger Reserve
- Ujjani dam
