= Barloni =

Village in Maharashtra

- Village
- Location in Maharashtra, India Barloni (India)
- Coordinates: 18.030°N 75.509°E
- Country: India
- State: Maharashtra
- District: Solapur

Languages
  - Official: Marathi
- Time zone: UTC+5:30 (IST)
- PIN: 413252

Barloni is a village in Madha Taluka tehsil of Solapur district in Maharashtra state of India.
