= Jaykumar Gore =

Indian Politician

Government of Maharashtra Minister of Rural Development & Panchayat Raj
- Incumbent
- Assumed office 15 December 2024
- Chief Minister: Devendra Fadnavis
- Guardian minister: Solapur district
- Preceded by: Girish Mahajan

Member of Maharashtra Legislative Assembly
- Incumbent
- Assumed office 2009
- Preceded by: Sampatrao Awaghade
- Constituency: Man

Personal details
- Born: 15 October 1975 (age 50) Boratwadi, Maan, Satara district
- Party: Bharatiya Janata Party (from 2019)
- Other political affiliations: Indian National Congress (2014-19); Independent (till 2014)
- Occupation: Politician
- Website: www.jaykumargore.com

Jaykumar Bhagwanrao Gore is an Indian politician and Bharatiya Janata Party leader from the Satara district. He is a three-term member of Maharashtra Legislative Assembly from Man Assembly Constituency.

== Political career ==
Jaykumar Gore is a member of the Rashtriya Swayamsevak Sangh (RSS), a right Hindu nationalist paramilitary volunteer organisation.
