= Dhairyasheel Patil =

Indian politicians

Dhairyasheel mohite patil

Member of Parliament, Lok Sabha
- Incumbent
- Assumed office 4 June 2024
- Preceded by: Ranjit Naik-Nimbalkar
- Constituency: Madha

Personal details
- Party: NCP (Sharadchandra Pawar)
- Occupation: Politician

Dhairyasheel Rajsinh Mohite-Patil is an Indian politician currently serving as the Member of Parliament, Lok Sabha from Madha Lok Sabha constituency. He affiliated with the Nationalist Congress Party (Sharadchandra Pawar).

== See also ==
- 18th Lok Sabha
- Madha Lok Sabha constituency
- Nationalist Congress Party (Sharadchandra Pawar)
