= Ranjit Naik-Nimbalkar =

Member of the 17th Lok Sabha

Member of Parliament, Lok Sabha
- In office 2019–2024
- Preceded by: Vijaysinh Mohite-Patil
- Succeeded by: Dhairyasheel Patil
- Constituency: Madha

Personal details
- Born: 19 February 1977 (age 49) Phaltan, Satara
- Party: Bharatiya Janata Party
- Other political affiliations: Shiv Sena
- Spouse: Sau Jijamala Naik Nimbalkar
- Parent(s): Hindurao Naik Nimbalkar & Mandakini Naik Nimbalkar
- Occupation: Businessman

Ranjit Naik-Nimbalkar, is an Indian politician and member of the 17th Lok Sabha, representing Madha constituency, Maharashtra. He is a member of the Bharatiya Janata Party.
