= Ranjitsinh Mohite-Patil =

Indian politician

Member of Maharashtra Legislative Council
- In office 14 May 2020 – 13 May 2026
- Constituency: elected by MLA's
- In office 02 January 2004 – 13 August 2009
- Constituency: Solapur Local Authorities

Member of Parliament, Rajya Sabha
- In office 4 August 2009 – 2 April 2012
- Preceded by: Supriya Sule
- Constituency: Maharashtra

Personal details
- Born: 5 May 1972 (age 54) Kolhapur, Maharashtra
- Party: Bharatiya Janata Party (2019-present)
- Other political affiliations: Nationalist Congress Party (Before 2019)
- Spouse: Satyaprabhadevi Mohite-Patil (m. 1995)
- Children: 1 son
- Parents: Vijaysinh Mohite–Patil (father); Nandinidevi (mother)
- Education: B.A. (English)

Ranjitsinh Mohite-Patil is an Indian politician from Bharatiya Janata Party and a Member of Legislative Council From Maharasthra.

== Political career ==
He is a Member of the Parliament of India representing Maharashtra in the Rajya Sabha, the upper house of the Indian Parliament during 2009-2012. He was elected in by-election after the resignation of sitting member from Nationalist Congress Party Supriya Sule, being elected in May 2009 to 15th Lok Sabha.

He is son of Vijaysingh Mohite-Patil, former deputy chief minister of Maharashtra and is President of Indian Bodybuilding and Fitness Federation. He was the first president of the state unit of Nationalist Youth Congress, youth wing of Nationalist Congress Party. He was also the Chairman of Solapur District Central Co-operative Bank.

He is a Member of Maharashtra Legislative Council from 14 May 2020, Solapur-Local Authorities constituency.

He was BJP Candidate for Maharasthra MLC Elections held unopposed in May 2020.

== Positions held ==
- Member of parliament ( 2009 to 2012)
- Member of legislative council of Maharashtra (2020 to till date)
