= Ganpatrao Deshmukh =

Indian politician (1927–2021)

Abasaheb Deshmukh

Member of Maharashtra Legislative Assembly
- In office 1999–2019
- Preceded by: Shahajibapu Patil
- Succeeded by: Shahajibapu Patil
- Constituency: Sangola
- In office 1974–1995
- Preceded by: S. Bapusaheb Patil
- Succeeded by: Shahajibapu Patil
- Constituency: Sangola
- In office 1962–1972
- Preceded by: Maruti Kamble
- Succeeded by: S. Bapusaheb Patil
- Constituency: Sangola

Personal details
- Born: 10 August 1927 Mouje. Penur, Tq. Mohol, Dist. Solapur District, British Raj
- Died: 30 July 2021 (aged 93) Solapur, Maharashtra
- Party: Peasants and Workers Party of India
- Spouse: Ratanbai Deshmukh
- Children: 3
- Profession: Politician

Bhai Ganpatrao Annasaheb Deshmukh (10 August 1927 – 30 July 2021) was an Indian politician. He remained a member of the Maharashtra Legislative Assembly for 54 years.

He was affectionately called "Abasaheb" by the people and He was also called "Bhai" by Peasants and workers.

== Biography ==
He was the leader of Peasants and Workers Party of India (PWP). He belongs to Hindu - Dhangar (shepherd) caste. He is the longest serving member of the Maharashtra Legislative Assembly having been elected 11 times, during the last 54 years, from Sangola in Solapur district. Deshmukh also briefly served as a minister in the First Sharad Pawar ministry in 1978, and later in 1999, when PWP supported the Congress-NCP alliance.

Deshmukh was first elected to the State Assembly in the 1962 elections, and since then won every election, except for the 1972 and 1995 elections. In 2012, the government and the Assembly congratulated him upon his completing 50 years as a member.

In the 2014 Maharashtra Legislative Assembly election at the age of eighty-eight, he won the Sangola constituency for a record 11th time with 94,374 votes.
