= Babanrao Vitthalrao Shinde =

Indian politician

Member of Maharashtra Legislative Assembly
- In office 1995–2024
- Preceded by: Pandurang Patil
- Succeeded by: Abhijeet Dhananjay Patil
- Constituency: Madha

Personal details
- Born: 1 September 1951 (age 75) Madha, Solapur District
- Party: Nationalist Congress Party
- Occupation: Politician

Babanrao Vitthalrao Shinde (born 1950) is an Indian politician from Maharashtra. He is a six time MLA from Madha Assembly constituency in Solapur District. He won the 2019 Maharashtra Legislative Assembly election representing the Nationalist Congress Party.

== Early life and education ==
Shinde is from Madha, Solapur District, Maharashtra. He is the son of Vitthalrao Maruti Shinde Patil. He passed Class 10, but discontinued his studies while studying Class 11 at Lokmanya Vidyalay, Pandharpur, in 1968.

== Career ==
Shinde won from Madha Assembly constituency representing Nationalist Congress Party in the 2019 Maharashtra Legislative Assembly election. He polled 1,42,573 votes and defeated his nearest rival, Sanjay Kokate of Shiva Sena, by a huge margin of 68,245 votes. He first became an MLA as an independent candidate winning from Madha Assembly constituency in the 1995 Maharashtra Legislative Assembly election and continued his winning streak till 2019. He won on Nationalist Congress Party ticket in the next five elections in 1999, 2004, 2009, 2014 and 2019.
