= Sachin Patil =

Indian politician

Sachin Sudhakar Kambale Patil (born 1970), is an Indian politician from Maharashtra. He is a member of the Maharashtra Legislative Assembly from Phaltan Assembly constituency, which is reserved for Scheduled Caste community, in Satara district. He won the 2024 Maharashtra Legislative Assembly election representing the Nationalist Congress Party.

== Early life and education ==
Patil is from Phaltan, Satara district, Maharashtra. He is the son of Sudhakar Gajanan Kambale. He passed Class 9 at Mudhoji High School and Junior College, Phaltan in 1985.

== Career ==
Patil is a first time MLA representing Nationalist Congress Party. He won the 2024 Maharashtra Legislative Assembly election from Phaltan Assembly constituency, a stronghold of NCP. He polled 119,287 votes and defeated his nearest rival and three time MLA, Deepak Prahlad Chavan of the Nationalist Congress Party (SP), by a margin of 17,046 votes.
