= Uttamrao Jankar =

Indian politician

Member of the Maharashtra Legislative Assembly
- Incumbent
- Assumed office 23 November 2024
- Preceded by: Ram Satpute
- Constituency: Malshiras

Whip of NCP(SP)
- Incumbent
- Assumed office 2 December 2024

Personal details
- Party: NCP(SP)
- Spouse: Not Known
- Occupation: Politician

Uttamrao Shivdas Jankar (born 1966) is an Indian politician from Maharashtra. He is an MLA from Malshiras Assembly constituency, which is reserved for Scheduled Caste community, in Solapur district. He won the 2024 Maharashtra Legislative Assembly election representing the Nationalist Congress Party - Sharadchandra Pawar.

== Early life and education ==
He is the son of Shri. Shivdas Shankarrao Jankar.

- Jankar is from Malshiras, Solapur district, Maharashtra.

He completed his B.A. in 1988 at Shankarrao Mohite Patil College, Malewadi Akluj, which is affiliated with Shivaji University, Kolhapur.

== Career ==
Jankar won from Malshiras Assembly constituency representing Nationalist Congress Party (SP) in the 2024 Maharashtra Legislative Assembly election. He polled 121,713 votes and defeated his nearest rival, Ram Vitthal Satpute of the Bharatiya Janata Party, by a margin of 13,147 votes.
