= Madha Assembly constituency =

Constituency of the Maharashtra legislative assembly in India

Coordinates: 18.03°N 75.52°E

Madha
- Constituency No. 245 for the Maharashtra Legislative Assembly

Constituency details
- Country: India
- Region: Western India
- State: Maharashtra
- District: Solapur
- Lok Sabha constituency: Madha
- Established: 1955
- Total electors: 353,046
- Reservation: None

Member of Legislative Assembly
- 15th Maharashtra Legislative Assembly
- Incumbent Abhijeet Dhananjay Patil
- Party: NCP-SP
- Alliance: MVA
- Elected year: 2024

Madha Assembly constituency is one of the 288 Vidhan Sabha (legislative assembly) constituencies of Maharashtra state in Southern India.

== Overview ==
Madha (constituency number 245) is one of the eleven Vidhan Sabha constituencies located in the Solapur District. It comprises parts of Madha, Pandharpur and Malshiras tehsils of this district. The number of electors in 2009 were 266,348 (Male 140,115, Female 126,233).

Madha is part of the Madha Lok Sabha constituency along with five other Vidhan Sabha segments, namely- Karmala, Sangole and Malshiras in the Solapur district and Phaltan and Maan in the Satara District.

== Members of the Legislative Assembly ==
Year	Member	Party
1957	Namdeo Mahadeo Jagtap; Ganpat Laxman Sonawane (Sc)	Indian National Congress
1962	Kashinath Babu Asware	Indian National Congress
1967	Sampatrao Maruti Patil	Peasants and Workers Party of India
1972	Vitthalrao Shinde	Indian National Congress
1978	Krishnarao Kondiba Parbat	Independent politician
1980	Dhanaji Ganapatrao Sathe	Indian National Congress (I)
1985	Pandurang Ganapat Patil	Independent politician
1990	Pandurang Ganapat Patil	Indian National Congress
1995	Babanrao Vitthalrao Shinde	Independent politician
1999	Babanrao Vitthalrao Shinde	Nationalist Congress Party
2004	Babanrao Vitthalrao Shinde	Nationalist Congress Party
2009	Babanrao Vitthalrao Shinde	Nationalist Congress Party
2014	Babanrao Vitthalrao Shinde	Nationalist Congress Party
2019	Babanrao Vitthalrao Shinde	Nationalist Congress Party
2024	Abhijeet Dhananjay Patil	Nationalist Congress Party – Sharadchandra Pawar

== Election results ==
=== Assembly Election 2024 ===
2024 Maharashtra Legislative Assembly election : Madha
Party	Candidate	Votes	%	±%
NCP-SP	Abhijeet Dhananjay Patil	136,559	50.90%	New
Independent	Ranjit Babanrao Shinde	105,938	39.49%	New
NCP	Adv. Minaltai Dadasaheb Sathe	13,381	4.99%	New
Independent	Rajesh Tanaji Khare	4,741	1.77%	New
VBA	Rahul Gautam Chavan	2,231	0.83%	New
NOTA	None of the Above	924	0.34%	▼0.38
Margin of victory		30,621	11.41%	▼18.85
Turnout		269,194	76.25%	▲6.94
Total valid votes		268,270		
Registered electors		353,046		▲8.12
NCP-SP gain from NCP		Swing	▼12.33	

=== Assembly Election 2019 ===
2019 Maharashtra Legislative Assembly election : Madha
Party	Candidate	Votes	%	±%
NCP	Babanrao Vitthalrao Shinde	142,573	63.23%	▲19.13
SS	Kokate Sanjay Shivlal	74,328	32.96%	▲14.65
BSP	Ashok Joti Takatode	3,000	1.33%	▲0.35
NOTA	None of the Above	1,628	0.72%	▲0.06
Sambhaji Brigade Party	Jagadale Dinesh Gopinath	1,449	0.64%	New
Independent	Anand Shamrao Londhe	1,412	0.63%	New
Margin of victory		68,245	30.27%	▲14.13
Turnout		227,276	69.60%	▼5.66
Total valid votes		225,480		
Registered electors		326,537		▲10.01
NCP hold		Swing	▲19.13	

=== Assembly Election 2014 ===
2014 Maharashtra Legislative Assembly election : Madha
Party	Candidate	Votes	%	±%
NCP	Babanrao Vitthalrao Shinde	97,803	44.10%	▼17.15
INC	Kale Kalyan Vasantrao	62,025	27.97%	New
SS	Sawant Shivaji Jaywant	40,616	18.32%	▲11.11
Independent	Sathe Ganpatrao Dhanajirao	14,149	6.38%	New
BSP	Prakshale Shrikrishana Dnyandev	2,169	0.98%	▼0.64
Independent	Hakepatil Sanjay Vasant	1,520	0.69%	New
NOTA	None of the Above	1,459	0.66%	New
Margin of victory		35,778	16.13%	▼18.97
Turnout		224,326	75.58%	▲7.16
Total valid votes		221,758		
Registered electors		296,816		▲11.44
NCP hold		Swing	▼17.15	

=== Assembly Election 2009 ===
2009 Maharashtra Legislative Assembly election : Madha
Party	Candidate	Votes	%	±%
NCP	Babanrao Vitthalrao Shinde	110,224	61.26%	▲0.12
Independent	Sawant Shivaji Jaywant	47,055	26.15%	New
SS	Patil Anil Sampatrao	12,962	7.20%	▼25.79
Independent	Shahajan Paigambar Shaikh	3,147	1.75%	New
BSP	Udaysingh Yuvraj Deshmukh	2,908	1.62%	▲0.50
RSPS	Keche Baban Gahininath	2,777	1.54%	▼0.14
Margin of victory		63,169	35.11%	▲6.96
Turnout		180,026	67.59%	▼8.73
Total valid votes		179,934		
Registered electors		266,348		▲33.78
NCP hold		Swing	▲0.12	

=== Assembly Election 2004 ===
2004 Maharashtra Legislative Assembly election : Madha
Party	Candidate	Votes	%	±%
NCP	Babanrao Vitthalrao Shinde	92,851	61.13%	▲6.76
SS	Sawant Shivaji Jaywant	50,106	32.99%	▲10.87
PWPI	Patil Shivaji Balbhim	3,296	2.17%	New
RSPS	Gore Prakash Ramchandra	2,561	1.69%	New
BSP	Devkate Deepak Bhanudas	1,697	1.12%	New
Independent	Mulani Shahajahan Paigambar	1,370	0.90%	New
Margin of victory		42,745	28.14%	▼4.11
Turnout		151,960	76.32%	▲13.10
Total valid votes		151,881		
Registered electors		199,096		▲13.99
NCP hold		Swing	▲6.76	

=== Assembly Election 1999 ===
1999 Maharashtra Legislative Assembly election : Madha
Party	Candidate	Votes	%	±%
NCP	Babanrao Vitthalrao Shinde	59,997	54.37%	New
SS	Dikole Dhananjay Mahadeo	24,408	22.12%	▲8.23
INC	Sathe Dhanaji Ganpatrao	21,542	19.52%	▼2.39
ABS	Bhagat Suryakant Ramchandra	3,577	3.24%	New
Independent	Sou. Shinde Meera Sudam	827	0.75%	New
Margin of victory		35,589	32.25%	▲16.69
Turnout		118,305	67.73%	▼16.85
Total valid votes		110,351		
Registered electors		174,660		▲7.12
NCP gain from Independent		Swing	▲16.90	

=== Assembly Election 1995 ===
1995 Maharashtra Legislative Assembly election : Madha
Party	Candidate	Votes	%	±%
Independent	Babanrao Vitthalrao Shinde	48,896	37.47%	New
INC	Pandurang Ganapat Patil	28,586	21.91%	▼11.08
Independent	Sathe Dhanaji Ganpatrao	18,792	14.40%	New
SS	Gore Prakash Ramchandra	18,125	13.89%	▼2.43
PWPI	S. M. Patil	7,925	6.07%	▼10.36
BSP	Maske Prakash Tukaram	5,808	4.45%	▲3.96
Independent	Keche Baban Gahininath	2,161	1.66%	New
Margin of victory		20,310	15.57%	▲4.75
Turnout		133,163	81.67%	▲14.90
Total valid votes		130,481		
Registered electors		163,048		▲4.54
Independent gain from INC		Swing	▲4.48	

=== Assembly Election 1990 ===
1990 Maharashtra Legislative Assembly election : Madha
Party	Candidate	Votes	%	±%
INC	Pandurang Ganapat Patil	33,510	32.99%	▼2.31
Independent	Sathe Dhanaji Ganapatrao	22,525	22.18%	New
PWPI	Bhai S. M. Patil	16,692	16.43%	▼2.11
SS	Gore Prakash Ramchandra	16,574	16.32%	New
JD	Kuntal Shah	10,954	10.78%	New
Margin of victory		10,985	10.81%	▲0.34
Turnout		103,569	66.40%	▼0.14
Total valid votes		101,578		
Registered electors		155,969		▲20.24
INC gain from Independent		Swing	▼12.79	

=== Assembly Election 1985 ===
1985 Maharashtra Legislative Assembly election : Madha
Party	Candidate	Votes	%	±%
Independent	Pandurang Ganapat Patil	38,760	45.78%	New
INC	Maske Prakash Tukaram	29,890	35.30%	New
PWPI	Patil Sampatrao Maruti	15,704	18.55%	▼8.32
Margin of victory		8,870	10.48%	▼5.80
Turnout		86,232	66.48%	▲5.92
Total valid votes		84,670		
Registered electors		129,719		▲14.04
Independent gain from INC(I)		Swing	▲1.79	

=== Assembly Election 1980 ===
1980 Maharashtra Legislative Assembly election : Madha
Party	Candidate	Votes	%	±%
INC(I)	Sathe Dhanaji Ganapatrao	29,698	43.99%	New
Independent	Shaha Kuntal Motichandra	18,707	27.71%	New
PWPI	Patil Sampatrao Maruti	18,139	26.87%	▼6.24
INC(U)	Parabat Krishnarao Kondiba	967	1.43%	New
Margin of victory		10,991	16.28%	▲12.17
Turnout		69,367	60.98%	▼4.08
Total valid votes		67,511		
Registered electors		113,751		▲7.08
INC(I) gain from Independent		Swing	▲6.78	

=== Assembly Election 1978 ===
1978 Maharashtra Legislative Assembly election : Madha
Party	Candidate	Votes	%	±%
Independent	Parbat Krishnarao Kondiba	25,076	37.21%	New
PWPI	Sampatrao Maruti Patil	22,308	33.11%	▲6.16
INC	Patil Pandurang Vithalrao	17,987	26.69%	▼21.24
Independent	Kamble Bhima Gujarappa	996	1.48%	New
Independent	Pawar Dattatraya Adilappa	697	1.03%	New
Margin of victory		2,768	4.11%	▼16.88
Turnout		69,579	65.50%	▼1.79
Total valid votes		67,382		
Registered electors		106,232		▲13.60
Independent gain from INC		Swing	▼10.72	

=== Assembly Election 1972 ===
1972 Maharashtra Legislative Assembly election : Madha
Party	Candidate	Votes	%	±%
INC	Vithalrao Shinde	29,233	47.94%	▲6.51
PWPI	Sampatrao Maruti Patil	16,434	26.95%	▼26.03
Independent	Sathe Dhanaji Ganapatrao	12,049	19.76%	New
ABJS	Kulkarni Vishnu Damodar	1,907	3.13%	▼2.47
RPI	Lankeshwar Apaji	833	1.37%	New
Independent	Shaha Anil Premchand	528	0.87%	New
Margin of victory		12,799	20.99%	▲9.43
Turnout		63,136	67.52%	▲0.45
Total valid votes		60,984		
Registered electors		93,511		▲10.83
INC gain from PWPI		Swing	▼5.04	

=== Assembly Election 1967 ===
1967 Maharashtra Legislative Assembly election : Madha
Party	Candidate	Votes	%	±%
PWPI	Sampatrao Maruti Patil	28,948	52.98%	New
INC	K. K. Parabat	22,634	41.42%	▼23.8
ABJS	V. D. Kulkarni	3,058	5.60%	New
Margin of victory		6,314	11.56%	▼22.04
Turnout		59,044	69.98%	▲29.63
Total valid votes		54,640		
Registered electors		84,370		▲16.03
PWPI gain from INC		Swing	▼12.24	

=== Assembly Election 1962 ===
1962 Maharashtra Legislative Assembly election : Madha
Party	Candidate	Votes	%	±%
INC	Kashinath Babu Asware	16,659	65.22%	▲43.04
RPI	Keru Appa Lankeshwar	8,078	31.63%	New
Independent	Digambar Appa Gaikwad	806	3.16%	New
Margin of victory		8,581	33.59%	▲31.94
Turnout		26,643	36.64%	▼44.24
Total valid votes		25,543		
Registered electors		72,715		▼41.93
INC hold		Swing	▲43.04	

=== Assembly Election 1957 ===
1957 Bombay State Legislative Assembly election : Madha
Party	Candidate	Votes	%	±%
INC	Jagatap Namdeo Mahadeo	22,039	22.17%	New
INC	Sonawane Ganpat Laxman (Sc)	20,394	20.52%	New
Independent	Patil Ganpatrao Ekanath	18,470	18.58%	New
SCF	Kambale Nivritti Satwaji (Sc)	15,929	16.03%	New
PWPI	Patil Sampatrao Maruti	15,397	15.49%	New
Independent	Asware Kashinath Babu	4,183	4.21%	New
Independent	Kharat Jangalu Tatya (Sc)	2,976	2.99%	New
Margin of victory		1,645	1.66%	New
Turnout		99,388	79.37%	New
Total valid votes		99,388		
Registered electors		125,223		New
INC gain from PWPI		Swing	{{{swing}}}	

== See also ==
- List of constituencies of Maharashtra Vidhan Sabha
- Madha
