= Pratapsinh Mohite-Patil =

Indian politician (1955–2015)

Pratapsinh Mohite-Patil (1955–2015) was an Indian politician and member of the Bharatiya Janata Party. Mohite-Patil was a member of the Maharashtra Legislative Assembly. He won Solapur (Lok Sabha constituency) in Solapur district. He was brother of former Deputy Chief Minister of Maharashtra Vijaysinh Mohite-patil. He was the Minister for Cooperation in the Shiv Sena-led state government in the late-90s under Narayan Rane as well as member of 13th Lok Sabha.
