= Ram Satpute =

Indian politician

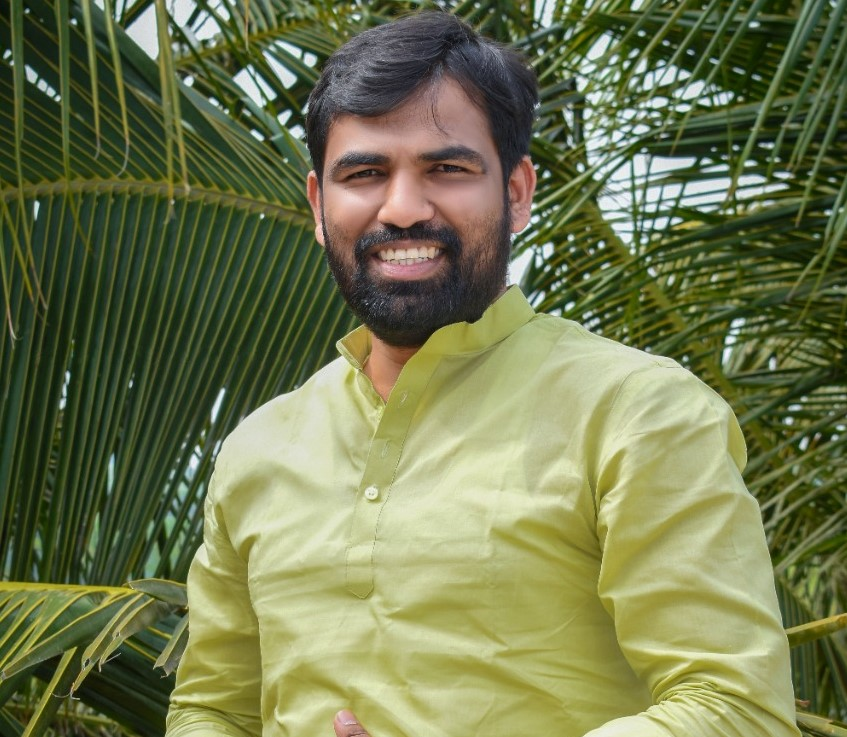

Former Member of Maharashtra Legislative Assembly
- In office 2019–2024
- Preceded by: Hanumant Dolas
- Succeeded by: Uttamrao Jankar
- Constituency: Malsiras

Personal details
- Born: 12 March 1988 (age 38) Ashti, Beed, India
- Party: Bharatiya Janata Party
- Education: Pune Vidhyarthi Griha's College of Engineering and Technology
- Profession: Politician, Social Worker, Engineer

Ram Vitthal Satpute is National Vice President of BJYM and a Former Member of Maharashtra Legislative Assembly (Vidhan Sabha) elected from Malshiras (Vidhan Sabha constituency).

== Early life and education ==
Ram Satpute was born on 12 March 1988 to a Marathi Hindu family of cane harvesters in Doithan Village, Ashti Taluka, district Beed, Maharashtra state. Ram's family belongs to the Scheduled Caste (SC) community.

Ram's father Vitthal Satpute worked as a cobbler at bus-stop of his village. As a child, Ram helped his parents in cane harvesting while they were working in a sugar factory. He was introduced to Rashtriya Swayamsevak Sangh in his school days. Ram completed his school education from Beed district. With guidance from local officials of Rashtriya Swayamsevak Sangh, he moved to Pune City for higher education.

He completed his Diploma in Printing Technology from PVG's Maharashtra Institute of Printing Technology. In 2015, Ram received a Bachelor of Engineering degree in Printing Technology from Pune Vidhyarthi Griha's College of Engineering and Technology affiliated with Savitraibai Phule Pune University.

== Student activism ==
Ram entered student activism during his college days through Akhil Bharatiya Vidyarthi Parishad. He led protest marches for student rights and against commercialization of education. While working for the organization for nearly a decade, Ram was elected as the State Secretary of Maharashtra State in 2016. He has also led protests against corruption in education department by government officers. In 2017, Ram led a protest rally to raise the issue of improper health infrastructure for students in Savitribai Phule Pune University.

== Anti-Naxal movement ==
Right from his initial days in student activism, Ram has spearheaded Anti-Naxal movement across Maharashtra. In 2011, Ram led Akhil Bharatiya Vidyarthi Parishad activists to protest against Binayak Sen, who is accused of having links with Naxal organizations. He has also exposed and thwarted attempts by Naxal front organizations like Kabir Kala Manch to create base among college students in Maharashtra.

== Political career ==
Ram entered Bharatiya Janata Party as the Vice President of Bharatiya Janata Yuva Morcha. He started helping the deprived people through various welfare schemes of State Government of Maharashtra. He was nominated as candidate from Malshiras (Vidhan Sabha constituency) for Maharashtra Legislative Assembly elections 2019. He won the contest by defeating heavyweight politician Uttam Jankar contesting from Nationalist Congress Party. Ram has been selected by the Central Election Committee of Bharatiya Janata Party to contest Solapur Loksabha Constituency in 2024 General Elections, in which he lost to Congress candidate Praniti Shinde by a margin of 74,000 votes.

== People's welfare activities ==
From the beginning of Ram's political career, he has practiced a work-culture of using all resources to help the weaker sections of society. He had risen to fame when he helped a senior citizen to get government-sanctioned ration after 20 years by directly talking to concerned government officers. Ram also has raised the issue of equal distribution of irrigation water, especially to drought-ridden regions.
