= Abhijeet Dhananjay Patil =

Indian politician

Abhijeet (Aaba) Patil

Member of Maharashtra Legislative Assembly
- Incumbent
- Assumed office (2024-Present)
- Preceded by: Babanrao Vitthalrao Shinde
- Constituency: Madha

Personal details
- Born: 1 August 1983 (age 42) Madha, Solapur district
- Party: Nationalist Congress Party (Sharadchandra Pawar)
- Occupation: Politician

Abhijeet Dhananjay Patil (born 1983) is an Indian politician from Maharashtra. He is an MLA from Madha Assembly constituency in Solapur district. He won the 2024 Maharashtra Legislative Assembly election representing the Nationalist Congress Party (SP).

== Early life and education ==
Patil is from Madha, Solapur district, Maharashtra. He is the son of Dhananjay Vitthalrao Patil. He studied Class 10 at Dhyanodyog Secondary and Higher Secondary School, Yermala and passed the examinations in 2008.

== Career ==
Patil won from Madha Assembly constituency representing Nationalist Congress Party (SP) in the 2024 Maharashtra Legislative Assembly election. He polled 136,559 votes and defeated his nearest rival and son of sitting MLA Vitthalrao Sinde, Ranjit Babanrao Shinde, an independent politician, by a margin of 30,621 votes, thus ending the six term reign on the constituency by NCP leader, Babanrao Vitthalrao Shinde. Minaltai Dadasaheb Sathe, his Nationalist Congress Party rival, finished only third, with 13,381 votes.
