= Narayan Patil =

Indian politician

Member of the Maharashtra Legislative Assembly
- In office 2014–2019
- Constituency: Karmala

Personal details
- Party: Nationalist Congress Party - Sharadchandra Pawar
- Occupation: Politician

Narayan Govindrao Patil is Shiv Sena politician from Solapur district, Maharashtra. He is a member of the 13th Maharashtra Legislative Assembly representing the Karmala Assembly Constituency. He is known as Aaba in Karmala constituency.

== Positions held ==
- 2014: Elected to Maharashtra Legislative Assembly
