= Malshiras Assembly constituency =

Constituency of the Maharashtra legislative assembly in India

Coordinates: 17.863°N 74.906°E

Malshiras
- Constituency No. 254 for the Maharashtra Legislative Assembly

Constituency details
- Country: India
- Region: Western India
- State: Maharashtra
- District: Solapur
- Lok Sabha constituency: Madha
- Established: 1951
- Total electors: 349,968
- Reservation: SC

Member of Legislative Assembly
- 15th Maharashtra Legislative Assembly
- Incumbent Uttamrao Jankar
- Party: NCP-SP
- Alliance: MVA
- Elected year: 2024

Malshiras Assembly constituency is one of the 288 Vidhan Sabha (legislative assembly) constituencies of Maharashtra state in western India. It is reserved for Scheduled Castes from 2008.

== Overview ==
Malshiras (constituency number 254) is one of the eleven Vidhan Sabha constituencies located in the Solapur district. It covers the entire Malshiras tehsil of this district. The number of electors in 2009 was 271422 (male 140224, female 131198).

Malshiras is part of Madha Lok Sabha constituency along with five other Vidhan Sabha segments, namely Madha, Sangole and Malshiras in Solapur district and Phaltan and Maan in Satara district.

== Members of the Legislative Assembly ==
Election	Member	Party
1952	Shankarrao Mohite-Patil	Independent politician
1957	Shankarrao Mohite-Patil	Independent politician
1962	Shankarrao Mohite-Patil	Indian National Congress
1967	Shankarrao Mohite-Patil	Indian National Congress
1972	Deshmukh C. Abasaheb	Indian National Congress
1978	Pati Shamrao Bhimrao	Janata Party
1980	Vijaysinh Mohite–Patil	Independent politician
1985	Vijaysinh Mohite–Patil	Indian National Congress
1990	Vijaysinh Mohite–Patil	Indian National Congress
1995	Vijaysinh Mohite–Patil	Indian National Congress
1999	Vijaysinh Mohite–Patil	Nationalist Congress Party
2004	Vijaysinh Mohite–Patil	Nationalist Congress Party
2009	Hanumant Dolas	Nationalist Congress Party
2014	Hanumant Dolas	Nationalist Congress Party
2019	Ram Vitthal Satpute	Bharatiya Janata Party
2024	Uttamrao Shivdas Jankar	Nationalist Congress Party – Sharadchandra Pawar

== Election results ==
=== Assembly Election 2024 ===
2024 Maharashtra Legislative Assembly election : Malshiras
Party	Candidate	Votes	%	±%
NCP-SP	Uttamrao Shivdas Jankar	121,713	50.51	New
BJP	Ram Vitthal Satpute	108,566	45.05	▼3.47
Independent	Namdas Ramesh Ankush	3,045	1.26	New
VBA	Raj Yashwant Kumar	2,268	0.94	▼1.66
NOTA	None of the above	1,878	0.78	▼0.11
Independent	Tribhuvan Vinayak Dhainje	1,701	0.71	New
Margin of victory		13,147	5.46	▲4.25
Turnout		242,850	69.39	▲2.24
Total valid votes		240,972		
Registered electors		349,968		▲9.14
NCP-SP gain from BJP		Swing	▲1.99	

=== Assembly Election 2019 ===
2019 Maharashtra Legislative Assembly election : Malshiras
Party	Candidate	Votes	%	±%
BJP	Ram Vitthal Satpute	103,507	48.52	New
NCP	Uttamrao Shivdas Jankar	100,917	47.30	▲9.14
VBA	Raj Yashwant Kumar	5,538	2.60	New
NOTA	None of the above	1,899	0.89	▲0.23
Margin of victory		2,590	1.21	▼1.88
Turnout		215,313	67.15	▼0.74
Total valid votes		213,344		
Registered electors		320,662		▲6.87
BJP gain from NCP		Swing	▲10.36	

=== Assembly Election 2014 ===
2014 Maharashtra Legislative Assembly election : Malshiras
Party	Candidate	Votes	%	±%
NCP	Hanumant Dolas	77,179	38.16	▼9.27
Independent	Khandagale Anant Jaykumar	70,934	35.07	New
SS	Sarwade Laxman Vitthal	23,537	11.64	New
Independent	Dhainje Tribhuvan Alias Balasaheb Vinayak	7,636	3.78	New
INC	Pro. Martand Ramchandra Sathe	5,061	2.50	New
BBM	Ajit Govind Naiknaware	2,634	1.30	▲0.09
MNS	Sathe Kiran Tanaji	2,175	1.08	New
BSP	Pro. Gaikwad Bharat Krushna	2,087	1.03	▼0.63
NOTA	None of the above	1,327	0.66	New
Margin of victory		6,245	3.09	▼6.25
Turnout		203,714	67.89	▲3.71
Total valid votes		202,249		
Registered electors		300,061		▲10.55
NCP hold		Swing	▼9.27	

=== Assembly Election 2009 ===
2009 Maharashtra Legislative Assembly election : Malshiras
Party	Candidate	Votes	%	±%
NCP	Hanumant Dolas	82,360	47.43	▼22.49
Independent	Jankar Uttamrao Shivadas	66,134	38.09	New
Independent	Prof. Martand Ramchandra Sathe	6,443	3.71	New
BJP	Kambale Dilip Dnyandeo	5,875	3.38	▼9.29
Independent	Baburao Tayappa More	3,249	1.87	New
Independent	Sudhir Arjun Pol	3,029	1.74	New
BSP	Gaikwad Pandurang Sadashiv	2,882	1.66	▼13.02
BBM	Kamble Dnyandeo Ganpat	2,103	1.21	New
Margin of victory		16,226	9.34	▼45.90
Turnout		174,207	64.18	▼14.09
Total valid votes		173,640		
Registered electors		271,422		▲12.06
NCP hold		Swing	▼22.49	

=== Assembly Election 2004 ===
2004 Maharashtra Legislative Assembly election : Malshiras
Party	Candidate	Votes	%	±%
NCP	Vijaysinh Mohite–Patil	132,543	69.92	▲15.77
BSP	Deshmukh Ramdas Abasaheb	27,831	14.68	New
BJP	Mote Ajitkumar (Kaka) Shivaji	24,013	12.67	▼27.42
RSPS	Rupnavar Annasaheb Balwant	5,165	2.72	New
Margin of victory		104,712	55.24	▲41.18
Turnout		189,575	78.27	▼0.18
Total valid votes		189,552		
Registered electors		242,216		▲23.38
NCP hold		Swing	▲15.77	

=== Assembly Election 1999 ===
1999 Maharashtra Legislative Assembly election : Malshiras
Party	Candidate	Votes	%	±%
NCP	Vijaysinh Mohite–Patil	76,576	54.15	New
BJP	Adv. Patil Subhash Balasaheb	56,692	40.09	▼2.20
INC	Patil Prakash Shamrao	5,064	3.58	▼51.32
Independent	Vastad Bhusare Nivruti Bhagwat	3,082	2.18	New
Margin of victory		19,884	14.06	▲1.45
Turnout		154,013	78.45	▼6.37
Total valid votes		141,414		
Registered electors		196,318		▲4.97
NCP gain from INC		Swing	▼0.75	

=== Assembly Election 1995 ===
1995 Maharashtra Legislative Assembly election : Malshiras
Party	Candidate	Votes	%	±%
INC	Vijaysinh Mohite–Patil	84,709	54.90	▼9.83
BJP	Patil Subhash Balasaheb	65,247	42.29	▲8.35
Independent	Patil Shamrao Bhimrao	2,768	1.79	New
Doordarshi Party	Patil Ravindra Gambhir	1,037	0.67	▼0.16
Margin of victory		19,462	12.61	▼18.17
Turnout		158,638	84.82	▲9.47
Total valid votes		154,302		
Registered electors		187,030		▲5.40
INC hold		Swing	▼9.83	

=== Assembly Election 1990 ===
1990 Maharashtra Legislative Assembly election : Malshiras
Party	Candidate	Votes	%	±%
INC	Vijaysinh Mohite–Patil	84,747	64.73	▼18.62
BJP	Patil Subhash Balasaheb	44,445	33.94	New
Doordarshi Party	Patil Pitambar Tanaku	1,086	0.83	New
Margin of victory		40,302	30.78	▼37.06
Turnout		133,701	75.35	▲0.24
Total valid votes		130,933		
Registered electors		177,440		▲21.58
INC hold		Swing	▼18.62	

=== Assembly Election 1985 ===
1985 Maharashtra Legislative Assembly election : Malshiras
Party	Candidate	Votes	%	±%
INC	Vijaysinh Mohite–Patil	89,397	83.35	New
IC(S)	Tate Subhash Mahadeo	16,635	15.51	New
Margin of victory		72,762	67.84	▲25.47
Turnout		109,624	75.11	▲1.54
Total valid votes		107,256		
Registered electors		145,948		▲14.87
INC gain from Independent		Swing	▲12.70	

=== Assembly Election 1980 ===
1980 Maharashtra Legislative Assembly election : Malshiras
Party	Candidate	Votes	%	±%
Independent	Vijaysinh Mohite–Patil	64,086	70.65	New
JP	Patil Shivajirao Bhavanrao	25,655	28.28	New
Margin of victory		38,431	42.37	▲29.13
Turnout		93,476	73.57	▼7.23
Total valid votes		90,704		
Registered electors		127,050		▲14.60
Independent gain from JP		Swing	▲14.60	

=== Assembly Election 1978 ===
1978 Maharashtra Legislative Assembly election : Malshiras
Party	Candidate	Votes	%	±%
JP	Pati Shamrao Bhimrao	48,473	56.05	New
INC	Shankarrao Mohite-Patil	37,025	42.81	New
Margin of victory		11,448	13.24	
Turnout		89,578	80.80	
Total valid votes		86,483		
Registered electors		110,860		
JP gain from INC		Swing		

=== Assembly Election 1972 ===
1972 Maharashtra Legislative Assembly election : Malshiras
Party	Candidate	Votes	%	±%
INC	Deshmukh C. Abasaheb	Unopposed		
Registered electors		99,178		▲20.97
INC hold		Swing		

=== Assembly Election 1967 ===
1967 Maharashtra Legislative Assembly election : Malshiras
Party	Candidate	Votes	%	±%
INC	Shankarrao Mohite-Patil	34,145	60.99	▲1.09
PWPI	J. N. Jadhav	21,019	37.54	New
Independent	S. C. Salave	821	1.47	New
Margin of victory		13,126	23.45	▲1.61
Turnout		59,706	72.83	▼0.82
Total valid votes		55,985		
Registered electors		81,985		▲4.85
INC hold		Swing	▲1.09	

=== Assembly Election 1962 ===
1962 Maharashtra Legislative Assembly election : Malshiras
Party	Candidate	Votes	%	±%
INC	Shankarrao Mohite-Patil	32,685	59.90	▲27.13
Independent	Shivajirao Bhawanrao Patil	20,767	38.06	New
Independent	Appa Sambhaji Londhe	1,115	2.04	New
Margin of victory		11,918	21.84	▼6.72
Turnout		57,590	73.65	▲16.34
Total valid votes		54,567		
Registered electors		78,196		▲27.89
INC gain from Independent		Swing	▼1.44	

=== Assembly Election 1957 ===
1957 Bombay State Legislative Assembly election : Malshiras
Party	Candidate	Votes	%	±%
Independent	Shankarrao Mohite-Patil	21,492	61.34	New
INC	Patil Hanamantrao Shankarrao	11,484	32.77	▲8.97
Independent	Jadhav Tukaram Ganapatrao	2,063	5.89	New
Margin of victory		10,008	28.56	▲0.85
Turnout		35,039	57.31	▲1.47
Total valid votes		35,039		
Registered electors		61,141		▲16.66
Independent hold		Swing	▲9.83	

=== Assembly Election 1952 ===
1952 Bombay State Legislative Assembly election : Malshiras
Party	Candidate	Votes	%	±%
Independent	Shankarrao Mohite-Patil	15,076	51.51	New
INC	Girme Jagannath Haribhau	6,967	23.80	New
Independent	Waghmode Sitaram Laxman	4,841	16.54	New
PWPI	Jadha Tukaram Ganpat	1,657	5.66	New
Independent	Bhagwat Sonappa Ballappa	726	2.48	New
Margin of victory		8,109	27.71	
Turnout		29,267	55.84	
Total valid votes		29,267		
Registered electors		52,408		
Independent win (new seat)				

== See also ==
- Karmala
- Politics of Maharashtra
- Politics in India
