= Peasants and Workers Party of India =

- General Secretary: Jayant Patil
- Founded: 1948 (78 years ago)
- Headquarters: Govt. Kutir, Opp. Mantralaya, VV Road, Nariman Point, Mumbai (Maharashtra)
- Youth wing: Purogami Yuvak Sanghatna
- Labour wing: All India Workers Trade Union
- Ideology: Communism; Marxism-Leninism
- Political position: Left-wing
- ECI status: Registered Party
- Alliance: Maha Vikas Aghadi (2019–present) (Maharashtra); INDIA (2023–present) (National Level); Maha Agadhi (2018–2019) (Maharashtra); UPA (2018–2023) (National Level)
- Seats in Maharashtra Legislative Assembly: 1 / 288
- Seats in Maharashtra Legislative Council: 0 / 78

Election symbol

The Peasants and Workers Party of India (PWP) is a Marxist-Leninist political party in Maharashtra, India. The party was founded in 1948, having its roots from the pre-Independence period and has around 10,000 members. The influence of the party is largely limited to three districts. The party was founded in Maharashtra by Keshavrao Jedhe of Pune, Shankarrao More, Bhausaheb Raut of Mumbai, Nana Patil of Satara, Tulshidas Jadhav of Solapur, Dajiba Desai of Belgaum, Madhavrao Bagal of Kolhapur, P K Bhapkar and Datta Deshmukh of Ahmednagar, Vithalrao Hande and others.

A former member of the Legislative Council of Maharashtra, Jayant Prabhakar Patil is the general secretary of the party. The party has 1 MLA and no MLC. The party has a strong hold on Raigad District as well as party has Zilla Parishad members in 6 districts of Maharashtra, namely Raigad, Solapur, Nashik, Nagpur, Nanded and Parabhani.

The student organization of the party is called Purogami Yuvak Sanghatna.

The trade union of the party is called All India Workers Trade Union, All India Insurance Workers Union and its Trade Union Federation is Progressive Workers and Peasants of India. Comrade Janardan Singh is General Secretary of these trade unions and trade union federation. The party has played a very important role in Samyukta Maharashtra Movement under the leadership of Bhausaheb Raut, Uddhavrao Patil, Dajiba Desai. Most important meetings of this movement and coordination took place at the Mumbai-Koliwadi, Girgaum bungalow of Shri Bhausaheb Raut.

In the 2014 Maharashtra Legislative Assembly election at age 88, Ganpatrao Deshmukh of the party won the Sangole constituency for record 11th time with 94,374 votes, defeating Shahajibapu Patil of Shiv Sena by 25,224 votes, while the NCP did not field a candidate against him.

== Electoral performance ==
=== Lok Sabha ===
| Year | Seats won | ± |
|---|---|---|
| 1952 | 2 / 48 | new |
| 1957 | 4 / 48 | ▲2 |
| 1962 | 0 / 48 | ▼4 |
| 1967 | 2 / 48 | ▲2 |
| 1971 | 0 / 48 | ▼2 |
| 1977 | 5 / 48 | ▲5 |
| 1980 | 0 / 48 | ▼5 |
| 1984 | 1 / 48 | ▲1 |
| 1989 | 1 / 48 | Steady |
| 1991 | 0 / 48 | ▼1 |
| 1996 | 0 / 48 | Steady |
| 1998 | 1 / 48 | ▲1 |
| 1999 | 1 / 48 | Steady |
| 2004 | 0 / 48 | ▼1 |
| 2009 | 0 / 48 | Steady |
| 2014 | 0 / 48 | Steady |
| 2019 | 0 / 48 | Steady |
| 2024 | 0 / 48 | Steady |

=== Vidhan Sabha ===
| Year | Seats won | Seats contested | ± | Voteshare (%) | ± (%) |
|---|---|---|---|---|---|
| 1952 | 14 / 315 | 87 | new | 6.45% | new |
| 1957 | 31 / 396 | 55 | ▲17 | 6.66% | ▲0.21% |
| 1962 | 15 / 264 | 79 | ▼16 | 7.47% | ▲0.81% |
| 1967 | 19 / 270 | 58 | ▲4 | 7.8% | ▲0.33% |
| 1972 | 7 / 270 | 58 | ▼12 | 5.66% | ▼2.14% |
| 1978 | 13 / 288 | 88 | ▲6 | 5.54% | ▼0.12% |
| 1980 | 9 / 288 | 41 | ▼4 | 4.14% | ▼1.4% |
| 1985 | 13 / 288 | 29 | ▲4 | 3.77% | ▼0.37% |
| 1990 | 8 / 288 | 40 | ▼5 | 2.42% | ▼1.35% |
| 1995 | 6 / 288 | 42 | ▼2 | 2.05% | ▼0.37% |
| 1999 | 5 / 288 | 22 | ▼1 | 1.49% | ▼0.56% |
| 2004 | 2 / 288 | 43 | ▼3 | 1.31% | ▼0.18% |
| 2009 | 4 / 288 | 17 | ▲2 | 1.11% | ▼0.2% |
| 2014 | 3 / 288 | 51 | ▼1 | 1.01% | ▼0.1% |
| 2019 | 1 / 288 | 24 | ▼2 | 0.97% | ▼0.04% |
| 2024 | 1 / 288 | 5 | Steady | 0.76% | ▼0.21% |

== Leadership ==
- Dajiba Desai
- Prof. N.D. Patil
- Loknete D. B. Patil
- Adv. Datta Patil
- Bhai Ganpatrao Deshmukh
- Udhavrao Patil
- Dr. Keshvrao Dhondge
- Babasaheb Deshmukh
- Bhai Kishanrao Deshmukh
- Sheshrao Deshmukh
- Vivek Patil
- Krishnarao Dhulap
- B. N. Deshmukh

== Strength in Maharashtra Legislative Assembly ==
For the 15th Maharashtra Legislative Assembly 2024, the party fielded 5 candidates out of which won the Sangola Assembly constituency seat by a margin of 25,386 votes. This makes Babasaheb Deshmukh the only Member of Maharashtra Legislative Assembly (MLA) from PWP.
