= Walwa, Sangli =

Waḷwa वाळवा
- Taluka
- Location in Maharashtra, India
- Coordinates: 17°02′N 074°22′E
- Country: India
- State: Maharashtra
- District: Sangli

Area
  - Total: 776.07 km^{2} (299.64 sq mi)

Population (2011)
  - Total: 455,138
  - Density: 586.47/km^{2} (1,518.9/sq mi)

Languages
  - Official: Marathi
- Time zone: UTC+5:30 (IST)
- PIN: 416313
- Vehicle registration: MH-10 (Sangli)

Walwa is a taluka in Sangli district in the Indian state of Maharashtra. It is also known as Walwa-Islampur Taluka. There are ninety-five panchayat villages in Walwa Taluka.

It is 205 km from Pune and 351 km from Mumbai. Before independence, Walwa was known for its Prati Sarkar movement, particularly for Kranti singh Nana Patil, Vinayakrao Thorat, 'Rajarambapu Patil' Hutatma Kisan Ahir, 'Lalasaheb Patil' and Nagnath Nayakwadi.

The Krishna River passes through the taluka. The major crops produced in the taluka are sugarcane and grapes. The major occupations are Agriculture and Animal Husbandry.

== Demographics ==
In the 2001 India census, Walwa Taluka had 427,377 inhabitants, 220,542 (51.6%) were males and 206,835 (48.4%) were females, for a gender ratio of 938 females per thousand males. The taluka was 78.6% rural in 2001.

Religions in Walwa taluk (2011)
Religion	Percent
Hinduism	88.65%
Islam	7.22%
Jainism	2.40%
Buddhism	1.33%
Other or not stated	0.40%

In the 2011 census the population had increased to 455,138 inhabitants and a gender ratio of 939 females per thousand males. The taluka was 77.0% rural in 2011. The literacy rate in 2011 was 86.03% overall in Walwa Taluka, with a rate of 92.83% for males and 78.92% for females. In 2011 in Walwa Taluka, 9.66% of the population was 0 to 6 years of age. Scheduled Castes and Scheduled Tribes make up 11.83% and 0.61% of the population respectively.

Languages of Walwa taluk (2011)
1. Marathi (92.1%)
2. Hindi (3.37%)
3. Urdu (2.34%)
4. Kannada (0.97%)
5. Others (1.21%)

At the time of the 2011 census, 92.11% of the population spoke Marathi, 3.37% Hindi, 2.34% Urdu and 0.97% Kannada as their first language.

== List of towns and villages ==
There are two towns in Walwa Taluka, Ashta and Uran Islampur both with municipal councils. There are more than ninety-five villages.

- Ashta
- Ahirwadi
- Aitavade Bk
- Aitavade Kh
- Bagani
- Bahadurwadi
- Bahe
- Banewadi
- Bavchi
- Beradmachi
- Bhadkimbe
- Bharatwadi
- Bhatwadi
- Bhavaninagar
- Bichud
- Borgaon
- Chikurde
- Devarde
- Dhagewadi
- Dhavali
- Dhotrewadi
- Dongarwadi
- Dudhari
- Farnewadi (Borgaon)
- Gatadwadi
- Gaundwadi
- Ghabakwadi
- Gotkhindi
- Hubalwadi
- Itkare
- Jakraiwadi
- Jambhulwadi
- June Khed
- Kakachiwadi
- Kalamwadi
- Kameri
- Kanegaon
- Kapuskhed
- Karandwadi
- Karanjvade
- Karve
- Kasegaon
- Kedarwadi
- Kharatwadi
- Kille Machhindra Gad
- Kole
- Koregaon
- Krishnanagar
- Kundalwadi
- Kurlap
- Ladegaon
- Lavanmachi
- Mahadevwadi
- Malewadi
- Manikwadi
- Maralnathpur
- Mardawadi
- Masuchiwadi
- Mirajwadi
- Nagaon
- Narsihapur
- Nave Khed
- Naykalwadi
- Nerle
- Ozarde
- Padavalwadi [15]
- Peth
- Phalkewadi & Chandachiwadi
- Pharnewadi(shigaon)
- Pokharni
- Rethare Harnaksha
- Rethare Dharan
- Rozawadi
- Sakharale
- Satapewadi
- Shekharwadi
- Shene
- Shigaon
- Shirate
- Shirala
- Shirgav
- Shirgaon
- Shivpuri
- Surul
- Takari
- Tambave
- Tandulwadi
- Thanapude
- Tujarpur
- Vashi
- Vitthalwadi
- Waghwadi
- Walwa
- Wategaon
- Yede Machchhindra
- Yede Nipani
- Yelur
- Yewalewadi
- Urun-Islampur

== See also ==
- Jayant Rajaram Patil
