= Walva Assembly constituency =

Former constituency of the Maharashtra legislative assembly in India

Coordinates: 19.85°N 73.19°E

Walva
- Former constituency for the Maharashtra Legislative Assembly

Constituency details
- Country: India
- Region: Western India
- State: Maharashtra
- Established: 1957
- Abolished: 2008

Walva (वाळवा) Vidhan Sabha seat was one of the constituencies of Maharashtra Legislative Assembly, in India. Walva seat existed until the 2004 elections after which most of the area under it was included in a new constituency named Islampur.

== Members of Vidhan Sabha ==
Year	Member	Party
1957	Nagnath Naikwadi	Peasants and Workers Party
1962	Rajarambapu Patil	Indian National Congress
1967	Rajarambapu Patil	Indian National Congress
1972	Rajarambapu Patil	Indian National Congress
1978	Vilasrao Shinde	Indian National Congress
1980	Vishwasrao Patil	Janata Party
1985	Nagnath Naikwadi	Independent
1990	Jayant Patil	Indian National Congress
1995	Jayant Patil	Indian National Congress
1999	Jayant Patil	Nationalist Congress Party
2004	Jayant Patil	Nationalist Congress Party
2008 onwards : See Islampur

== Election results ==
=== Assembly Election 2004 ===
2004 Maharashtra Legislative Assembly election : Walva
Party	Candidate	Votes	%	±%
NCP	Jayant Rajaram Patil	120,830	74.43%	▲13.17
SBP	Raghunath Ramchandra Patil	35,740	22.02%	New
BSP	Kamble Sharad Shivaji	2,919	1.80%	New
Independent	Waydande Ashok Narayan	1,675	1.03%	New
Independent	Jaypal Shankar Choudhari (Aba)	1,172	0.72%	New
Margin of victory		85,090	52.42%	▲12.65
Turnout		163,167	75.15%	▲1.30
Total valid votes		162,336		
Registered electors		217,121		▲13.01
NCP hold		Swing	▲13.17	

=== Assembly Election 1999 ===
1999 Maharashtra Legislative Assembly election : Walva
Party	Candidate	Votes	%	±%
NCP	Jayant Rajaram Patil	83,112	61.26%	New
BJP	C. B. Patil	29,162	21.50%	▼0.22
INC	S. Y. Patil	22,757	16.77%	▼48.68
Margin of victory		53,950	39.77%	▼3.96
Turnout		141,886	73.85%	▼4.38
Total valid votes		135,667		
Registered electors		192,130		▲3.98
NCP gain from INC		Swing	▼4.19	

=== Assembly Election 1995 ===
1995 Maharashtra Legislative Assembly election : Walva
Party	Candidate	Votes	%	±%
INC	Jayant Rajaram Patil	94,605	65.45%	▲5.33
BJP	Patil Ashok Shamarao	31,394	21.72%	▲20.59
PWPI	Pracharya Sayanakar Vishwas Baburao	11,459	7.93%	New
Independent	Raghunath Ramchandra Patil	3,788	2.62%	New
Margin of victory		63,211	43.73%	▲19.57
Turnout		147,514	79.84%	▼1.05
Total valid votes		144,545		
Registered electors		184,768		▲8.71
INC hold		Swing	▲5.33	

=== Assembly Election 1990 ===
1990 Maharashtra Legislative Assembly election : Walva
Party	Candidate	Votes	%	±%
INC	Jayant Rajaram Patil	81,018	60.12%	▲18.80
Independent	Shinde Vilasrao Bhauso	48,459	35.96%	New
JD	Patil Raghunath Ramchandra	2,308	1.71%	New
BJP	Suryawanshi Babaso Vishnu	1,522	1.13%	New
Margin of victory		32,559	24.16%	▲16.68
Turnout		136,139	80.10%	▲7.08
Total valid votes		134,754		
Registered electors		169,964		▲24.86
INC gain from Independent		Swing	▲11.31	

=== Assembly Election 1985 ===
1985 Maharashtra Legislative Assembly election : Walva
Party	Candidate	Votes	%	±%
Independent	Nagnath Naikwadi	47,970	48.81%	New
INC	Shinde Vilasrao Bhauso	40,616	41.33%	New
PWPI	Bhai Shivajirao Mane	8,768	8.92%	New
Margin of victory		7,354	7.48%	▼1.83
Turnout		99,673	73.22%	▲2.79
Total valid votes		98,282		
Registered electors		136,125		▲11.02
Independent gain from JP		Swing	▲0.89	

=== Assembly Election 1980 ===
1980 Maharashtra Legislative Assembly election : Walva
Party	Candidate	Votes	%	±%
JP	Vishwasrao Atmaram Patil	40,779	47.92%	▲16.69
INC(I)	Gulabrao Raghunathrao Patil	32,856	38.61%	▲38.00
INC(U)	Manikrao Mohanrao Patil	5,646	6.63%	New
Independent	Chandrakant Bhimrao Patil	3,535	4.15%	New
BJP	Patil Ashok Ramchandra	1,123	1.32%	New
Independent	Kamble Krishnarao Bhau	544	0.64%	New
Margin of victory		7,923	9.31%	▼1.39
Turnout		86,492	70.54%	▼11.84
Total valid votes		85,103		
Registered electors		122,618		▲8.62
JP gain from INC		Swing	▲5.99	

=== Assembly Election 1978 ===
1978 Maharashtra Legislative Assembly election : Walva
Party	Candidate	Votes	%	±%
INC	Shinde Vilasrao Bhauso	38,449	41.92%	▼46.27
JP	Rajarambapu Patil	28,637	31.23%	New
PWPI	N. D. Patil alias Narayan Dnyandev Patil	22,464	24.49%	▲16.48
Independent	Vethare Janendra Devappa	1,026	1.12%	New
INC(I)	Patil Madhav Hindurao	555	0.61%	New
Margin of victory		9,812	10.70%	▼69.48
Turnout		93,047	82.43%	▲2.92
Total valid votes		91,710		
Registered electors		112,883		▲18.86
INC hold		Swing	▼46.27	

=== Assembly Election 1972 ===
1972 Maharashtra Legislative Assembly election : Walva
Party	Candidate	Votes	%	±%
INC	Rajarambapu Patil	65,607	88.20%	▲24.41
PWPI	Shinde Vasant Shankar	5,963	8.02%	▼27.44
ABJS	Joshi Rajaram Ganapati	2,815	3.78%	New
Margin of victory		59,644	80.18%	▲51.85
Turnout		75,785	79.80%	▼1.95
Total valid votes		74,385		
Registered electors		94,971		▲18.05
INC hold		Swing	▲24.41	

=== Assembly Election 1967 ===
1967 Maharashtra Legislative Assembly election : Walva
Party	Candidate	Votes	%	±%
INC	Rajarambapu Patil	41,202	63.79%	▼10.20
PWPI	N. D. Patil alias Narayan Dnyandev Patil	22,903	35.46%	▲9.45
Independent	V. M. Bhandare	481	0.74%	New
Margin of victory		18,299	28.33%	▼19.65
Turnout		66,343	82.46%	▲0.00
Total valid votes		64,586		
Registered electors		80,453		▲7.76
INC hold		Swing	▼10.20	

=== Assembly Election 1962 ===
1962 Maharashtra Legislative Assembly election : Walva
Party	Candidate	Votes	%	±%
INC	Rajarambapu Patil	44,345	73.99%	▲34.21
PWPI	N. D. Patil alias Narayan Dnyandev Patil	15,589	26.01%	▼34.21
Margin of victory		28,756	47.98%	▲27.54
Turnout		61,635	82.55%	▲6.37
Total valid votes		59,934		
Registered electors		74,662		▲17.18
INC gain from PWPI		Swing	▲13.77	

=== Assembly Election 1957 ===
1957 Bombay State Legislative Assembly election : Walva
Party	Candidate	Votes	%	±%
PWPI	Nagnath Naikwadi	28,356	60.22%	New
INC	Patil Sadashivrao Daji	18,733	39.78%	New
Margin of victory		9,623	20.44%	
Turnout		47,089	73.91%	
Total valid votes		47,089		
Registered electors		63,714		
PWPI win (new seat)				

== See also ==
- Islampur Assembly constituency
- List of constituencies of Maharashtra Legislative Assembly
