= Ministry of Rural Development (Maharashtra) =

Government department of Maharashtra, India

Ministry of Rural Development and Panchayat Raj Government of Maharashtra
- मंत्रालय ग्रामविकास व पंचायत राज विभाग महाराष्ट्र शासन
- Seal of the state of Maharashtra

- Building of Administrative Headquarters of Mumbai

Agency overview
- Formed: 1960; 66 years ago
- Preceding agency: Department of Rural and Panchayat Raj Development
- Jurisdiction: Chief Minister of Maharashtra
- Headquarters: Mantralaya, Mumbai
- Annual budget: State budget of Government of Maharashtra
- Minister responsible: Jaykumar Gore, Cabinet Minister
- Deputy Minister responsible: Yogesh Kadam, Minister of State
- Agency executives: -, Principal Secretary; -, Joint Secretary; -, Deputy Secretary

The Ministry of Rural Development and Panchayat Raj Department Maharashtra is a ministry of the Government of Maharashtra.

It is currently headed by Girish Mahajan, a Cabinet Minister.

== Head office ==
Minister of Rural Development and Panchayat Raj मंत्री ग्रामविकास व पंचायत राज विभाग
- Emblem of India

- Flag of India
- Incumbent; Jaykumar Gore since 21 December 2024
- Ministry of Rural Development and Panchayat Raj (Maharashtra)
- Style: The Honourable
- Abbreviation: Cabinet Minister
- Member of: State Cabinet
- Reports to: Chief Minister, Maharashtra Legislature
- Seat: Mantralaya, Mumbai
- Appointer: Governor on the advice of the Chief Minister
- Term length: 5 years
- Precursor: Devendra Fadnavis; (2024- 2024)
- Inaugural holder: Gopalrao Bajirao Khedkar; (1960-1962)
- Formation: 1 May 1960
- Deputy: Yogesh Kadam

== Cabinet Ministers ==
No.	Portrait	Minister (constituency)	Term of office			Political party	Ministry	Chief Minister
No.	Portrait	Minister (constituency)	From	To	Period	Political party	Ministry	Chief Minister
Minister of Rural Development
01		Shankarrao Chavan (MLA for Bhokar Constituency No. 85- Nanded District) (Legislative Assembly)	01 May 1960	07 March 1962	1 year, 310 days	Indian National Congress	Yashwantrao I	Yashwantrao Chavan
02		Gopalrao Bajirao Khedkar (MLA for Akot Constituency No. 28- Akola District) (Legislative Assembly)	08 March 1962	19 November 1962	256 days	Indian National Congress	Yashwantrao II	Yashwantrao Chavan
03		Gopalrao Bajirao Khedkar (MLA for Akot Constituency No. 28- Akola District) (Legislative Assembly)	20 November 1962	24 November 1963	1 year, 4 days	Indian National Congress	Kannamwar l	Marotrao Kannamwar
04		Parashuram Krishnaji Sawant (MLA for Chiplun Constituency No. 265- Ratnagiri District) (Legislative Assembly) (Interim Chief Minister)	25 November 1962	04 December 1963	9 days	Indian National Congress	Sawant	Parashuram Krishnaji Sawant
05		Gopalrao Bajirao Khedkar (MLA for Akot Constituency No. 28- Akola District) (Legislative Assembly)	05 December 1963	01 March 1967	3 years, 86 days	Indian National Congress	Vasantrao I	Vasantrao Naik
06		Sheshrao Krishnarao Wankhede (MLA for Sawargoan Constituency No. 49- Nagpur District) (Legislative Assembly)	01 March 1967	27 October 1969	2 years, 240 days	Indian National Congress	Vasantrao II	Vasantrao Naik
07		Balasaheb Desai (MLA for Patan Constituency No. 261- Satara District) (Legislative Assembly)	27 October 1969	13 March 1972	2 years, 138 days	Indian National Congress	Vasantrao II	Vasantrao Naik
08		Abdul Rahman Antulay (MLA for Shrivardhan Constituency No. 193- Raigad District) (Legislative Assembly)	13 March 1972	04 April 1973	1 year, 32 days	Indian National Congress	Vasantrao III	Vasantrao Naik
09		Vasantrao Naik (MLA for Pusad Constituency No. 81- Yavatmal District) (Legislative Assembly) (Chief Minister)	04 April 1973	17 Match; 1974	347 days	Indian National Congress	Vasantrao III	Vasantrao Naik
10		Pratibha Patil (MLA for Jalgaon City Constituency No. 13- Jalgaon District) (Legislative Assembly)	17 Match; 1974	21 February 1975	341 days	Indian National Congress	Vasantrao III	Vasantrao Naik
Minister of Rural Development and Minister of New Townships
11		Sundarrao Solanke (Minister of Rural Development) (MLA for Majalgaon Constituency No. 229- Beed District) (Legislative Assembly)	21 February 1975	16 April 1977	2 years, 54 days	Indian National Congress	Shankarrao I	Shankarrao Chavan
12		Rafiq Zakaria (Minister of New Townships) (MLC for Elected by MLAs Constituency No. 16 - Mumbai Suburban District) (Legislative Council)	21 February 1975	16 April 1977	2 years, 54 days	Indian National Congress	Shankarrao I	Shankarrao Chavan
13		K. M. Patil (Minister of Rural Development) (MLA for Amalner Constituency No. 15- Jalgaon District) (Legislative Assembly)	17 April 1977	07 March 1978	1 year, 324 days	Indian National Congress	Vasantdada I	Vasantdada Patil
14		Narendra Mahipati Tidke (Minister of New Townships) (MLA for Savner Constituency No. 49- Nagpur District) (Legislative Assembly)	17 April 1977	07 March 1978	1 year, 324 days	Indian National Congress	Vasantdada I	Vasantdada Patil
15		Baburao Kale (Minister of Rural Development) (MLA for Ghansavangi Jalna Constituency No. 190- Jalna District) (Legislative Assembly)	07 March 1978	18 July 1978	133 days	Indian National Congress	Vasantdada II	Vasantdada Patil
16		Prabha Rau (Minister of New Townships) (MLA for Pulgaon Constituency No. 41- Wardha District) (Legislative Assembly)	07 March 1978	18 July 1978	133 days	Indian National Congress (Indira)	Vasantdada II	Vasantdada Patil
Minister of Rural Development
17		Nihal Ahmed Maulavi Mohammed Usman (MLA for Malegaon Central Constituency No. 114- Nashik District) (Legislative Assembly)	18 July 1978	18 February 1980	1 year, 215 days	Janata Party	Pawar I	Sharad Pawar
18		Baburao Kale (MLA for Ghansavangi Jalna Constituency No. 190- Jalna District) (Legislative Assembly)	09 June 1980	21 January 1982	1 year, 226 days	Indian National Congress	Antulay	Abdul Rahman Antulay
19		Sharadchandrika Suresh Patil (MLA for Chopda Constituency No. 10- Jalgaon District) (Legislative Assembly)	21 January 1982	02 February 1983	1 year, 12 days	Indian National Congress	Bhosale	Babasaheb Bhosale
Minister of Rural Development and Minister of Panchayat Raj
20		Prataprao Baburao Bhosale (Minister of Rural Development) (MLA for Wai Constituency No. 256- Satara District) (Legislative Assembly)	07 February 1983	05 March 1985	2 years, 26 days	Indian National Congress	Vasantdada III	Vasantdada Patil
21		Nanabhau Yambadwar (Minister of Panchayat Raj) (MLC for Bhandara - Gondia Local Authorities Constituency No. 14 - Gondia District) (Legislative Council)	07 February 1983	05 March 1985	2 years, 26 days	Indian National Congress	Vasantdada III	Vasantdada Patil
22		Balachandra Bhai Sawant (Minister of Rural Development) (MLC for Elected by MLAs Constituency No. 09 - Ratnagiri District) (Legislative Council)	12 March 1985	03 June 1985	83 days	Indian National Congress	Vasantdada IV	Vasantdada Patil
23		Jawaharlal Darda (Minister of Panchayat Raj) (MLC for Elected by MLAs Constituency No. 19 - Yavatmal District) (Legislative Council)	12 March 1985	03 June 1985	83 days	Indian National Congress	Vasantdada IV	Vasantdada Patil
24		Balachandra Bhai Sawant (Minister of Rural Development) (MLC for Elected by MLAs Constituency No. 09 - Ratnagiri District) (Legislative Council)	03 June 1985	12 March 1986	282 days	Indian National Congress	Nilangekar	Shivajirao Patil Nilangekar
25		Sushilkumar Shinde (Minister of Panchayat Raj) (MLA for Solapur City Central Constituency No. 249- Solapur District) (Legislative Assembly)	03 June 1985	12 March 1986	282 days	Indian National Congress	Nilangekar	Shivajirao Patil Nilangekar
26		Balachandra Bhai Sawant (Minister of Rural Development) (MLC for Elected by MLAs Constituency No. 09 - Ratnagiri District) (Legislative Council)	12 March 1986	26 June 1988	2 years, 106 days	Indian National Congress	Shankarrao II	Shankarrao Chavan
27		Ram Meghe (Minister of Panchayat Raj) (MLA for Daryapur Constituency No. 40- Amravati District) (Legislative Assembly)	12 March 1986	26 June 1988	2 years, 106 days	Indian National Congress	Shankarrao II	Shankarrao Chavan
28		Sudhakarrao Naik (Minister of Rural Development) (MLA for Pusad Constituency No. 81- Yavatmal District) (Legislative Assembly)	26 June 1988	03 March 1990	1 year, 250 days	Indian National Congress	Pawar II	Sharad Pawar
29		Kamalkishor Kadam (Minister of Panchayat Raj) (MLA for Nanded Constituency No. 66- Nanded District (Legislative Assembly)	26 June 1988	03 March 1990	1 year, 250 days	Indian National Congress	Pawar II	Sharad Pawar
30		Shivajirao Deshmukh (Minister of Rural Development) (MLC for Elected by MLAs Constituency No. 18 - Sangli District) (Legislative Council)	03 March 1990	25 January 1991	328 days	Indian National Congress	Pawar III	Sharad Pawar
31		Padamsinh Bajirao Patil (Minister of Panchayat Raj) (MLA for Osmanabad Constituency No. 242- Osmanabad District (Legislative Assembly)	03 March 1990	25 January 1991	328 days	Indian National Congress	Pawar III	Sharad Pawar
32		Datta Meghe (Minister of Rural Development) (MLC for Elected by MLAs Constituency No. 15 - Wardha District) (Legislative Council)	25 January 1991	25 June 1991	151 days	Indian National Congress	Pawar III	Sharad Pawar
33		Abhaysinh Raje Bhosale (Minister of Panchayat Raj) (MLA for Satara Constituency No. 262- Satara District (Legislative Assembly)	25 January 1991	25 June 1991	151 days	Indian National Congress	Pawar III	Sharad Pawar
34		Vilasrao Deshmukh (Minister of Rural Development) (MLA for Latur City Constituency No. 235- Latur District) (Legislative Assembly)	25 June 1991	22 February 1993	1 year, 242 days	Indian National Congress	Sudhakarrao	Sudhakarrao Naik
35		Ramrao Adik (Minister of Panchayat Raj) (MLC for Elected by MLAs Constituency No. 05 - Ahmednagar District) (Legislative Council)	25 June 1991	22 February 1993	1 year, 242 days	Indian National Congress	Sudhakarrao	Sudhakarrao Naik
Minister of Rural Development and Panchayat Raj
36		Ranjeet Deshmukh (MLA for Savner Constituency No. 49- Nagpur District) (Legislative Assembly)	06 March 1993	18 November 1994	1 year, 257 days	Indian National Congress	Pawar IV	Sharad Pawar
37		Anna Dange (MLC for Elected by MLAs Constituency No. 05 - Sangli District) (Legislative Council)	14 March 1995	01 February 1999	3 years, 324 days	Bharatiya Janata Party	Joshi	Manohar Joshi
38		Sudhir Joshi (MLC for Elected by MLAs Constituency No. 21 - Mumbai City District) (Legislative Council)	01 February 1999	11 May 1999	99 days	Shiv Sena	Rane	Narayan Rane
39		Gopinath Munde (MLA for Renapur Constituency No. 236 - Latur District) (Legislative Assembly) (Deputy Chief Minister)	11 May 1999	17 October 1999	159 days	Bharatiya Janata Party	Rane	Narayan Rane
40		Chhagan Bhujbal (MLC for Elected by MLAs Constituency No. 09 - Mumbai City District) (Legislative Council) (Deputy Chief Minister)	19 October 1999	27 October 1999	8 days	Nationalist Congress Party	Deshmukh I	Vilasrao Deshmukh
41		R. R. Patil (MLA for Tasgaon-Kavathe Mahankal Constituency No. 287- Sangli District) (Legislative Assembly)	27 October 1999	16 January 2003	3 years, 81 days	Nationalist Congress Party	Deshmukh I	Vilasrao Deshmukh
42		Ranjeet Deshmukh (MLC for Elected by MLAs Constituency No. 16 - Nagpur District) (Legislative Council)	18 January 2003	05 May 2003	114 days	Indian National Congress	Sushilkumar	Sushilkumar Shinde
43		Ajit Pawar (MLA for Baramati Constituency No. 201- Pune District (Legislative Assembly)	05 May 2003	01 November 2004	1 year, 180 days	Nationalist Congress Party	Sushilkumar	Sushilkumar Shinde
44		R. R. Patil (MLA for Tasgaon-Kavathe Mahankal Constituency No. 287- Sangli District) (Legislative Assembly) (Deputy Chief Minister)	01 November 2004	09 November 2004	8 days	Nationalist Congress Party	Deshmukh II	Vilasrao Deshmukh
45		Vijaysinh Mohite-Patil (MLA for Malshiras Constituency No. 254- Solapur District) (Legislative Assembly)	09 November 2004	01 December 2008	4 years, 22 days	Nationalist Congress Party	Deshmukh II	Vilasrao Deshmukh
46		R. R. Patil (MLA for Tasgaon-Kavathe Mahankal Constituency No. 287- Sangli District) (Legislative Assembly)	08 December 2008	06 November 2009	333 days	Indian National Congress	Ashok I	Ashok Chavan
47		Jayant Patil (MLA for Islampur Constituency No. 283- Sangli District) (Legislative Assembly)	07 November 2009	10 November 2010	1 year, 3 days	Nationalist Congress Party	Ashok II	Ashok Chavan
48		Jayant Patil (MLA for Islampur Constituency No. 283- Sangli District) (Legislative Assembly)	11 November 2010	26 September 2014	3 years, 319 days	Nationalist Congress Party	Prithviraj	Prithviraj Chavan
49		Pankaja Munde (MLA for Parli Constituency No. 233- Beed District) (Legislative Assembly)	31 October 2014	12 November 2019	5 years, 12 days	Bharatiya Janata Party	Fadnavis I	Devendra Fadnavis
50		Devendra Fadnavis (MLA for Nagpur South West Constituency No. 52- Nagpur District) (Legislative Assembly) (Chief_Minister); In Charge	23 November 2019	28 November 2019	5 days	Bharatiya Janata Party	Fadnavis II	Devendra Fadnavis
51		Chhagan Bhujbal (MLA for Yevla Constituency No. 119- Nashik District) (Legislative Assembly)	28 November 2019	30 December 2019	32 days	Nationalist Congress Party	Thackeray	Uddhav Thackeray
52		Hasan Mushrif (MLA for Kagal Constituency No. 273- Kolhapur District) (Legislative Assembly)	30 December 2019	29 June 2022	2 years, 181 days	Nationalist Congress Party	Thackeray	Uddhav Thackeray
53		Eknath Shinde (MLA for Kopri-Pachpakhadi Constituency No. 147- Thane District) (Legislative Assembly) (Chief Minister); In Charge	30 June 2022	14 August 2022	45 days	Shiv Sena (2022–present)	Eknath	Eknath Shinde
54		Girish Mahajan (MLA for Jamner Constituency No. 19- Jalgaon District) (Legislative Assembly)	14 August 2022	26 November 2024	2 years, 135 days	Bharatiya Janata Party	Eknath	Eknath Shinde
55		Devendra Fadnavis (MLA for Nagpur South West Constituency No. 52- Nagpur District) (Legislative Assembly) (Chief_Minister); In Charge	05 December 2024	21 December 2024	16 days	Bharatiya Janata Party	Fadnavis III	Devendra Fadnavis
56		Jaykumar Gore (MLA for Man Constituency No. 258- Satara District (Legislative Assembly)	21 December 2024	Incumbent	1 year, 281 days	Bharatiya Janata Party	Fadnavis III	Devendra Fadnavis

== Ministers of State ==
No.	Portrait	Deputy Minister (constituency)	Term of office			Political party	Ministry	Minister	Chief Minister
No.	Portrait	Deputy Minister (constituency)	From	To	Period	Political party	Ministry	Minister	Chief Minister
Deputy Minister of Rural Development and Panchayat Raj
Vacant			23 November 2019	28 November 2019	5 days	NA	Fadnavis II	Devendra Fadnavis	Devendra Fadnavis
01		Abdul Sattar Abdul Nabi (MLA for Sillod Constituency No. 104- Chhatrapati Sambhaji Nagar District Also Previously Known Aurangabad District (Legislative Assembly)	30 December 2019	27 June 2022	2 years, 179 days	Shiv Sena	Thackeray	Hasan Mushrif	Uddhav Thackeray
02		Satej Patil (MLC for Elected by Kolhapur Local Authorities Constituency No. 06 - Kolhapur District) (Legislative Council); Additional_Charge	27 June 2022	29 June 2022	2 days	Indian National Congress	Thackeray	Hasan Mushrif	Uddhav Thackeray
Vacant			30 June 2022	26 November 2024	2 years, 149 days	NA	Eknath	Eknath Shinde (2022 - 2022); Girish Mahajan (2022 - 2024)	Eknath Shinde
03		Yogesh Kadam (MLA for Dapoli Constituency No. 263- Ratnagiri District) (Legislative Assembly)	21 December 2024	Incumbent	1 year, 281 days	Shiv Sena (Shinde Group)	Fadnavis III	Jaykumar Gore (2024–Present)	Devendra Fadnavis
