= Tasgaon Assembly constituency =

Former constituency of the Maharashtra legislative assembly in India

Tasgaon
- Former constituency for the Maharashtra Legislative Assembly

Constituency details
- Country: India
- Region: Western India
- State: Maharashtra
- Lok Sabha constituency: Sangli
- Established: 1955
- Abolished: 2008

Tasgaon Vidhan Sabha seat was one of the constituencies of Maharashtra Vidhan Sabha, in India. It was a segment of Sangli Lok Sabha constituency. Tasgaon seat existed until the 2004 elections after which it was succeeded by Tasgaon-Kavathe Mahankal Assembly constituency seat in 2008.

== Members of Legislative Assembly ==
Year	Member	Party
1957	Ganpati Dada Lad	Peasants and Workers Party of India
1962	Dhondiram Yeshwant Patil	Indian National Congress
1967	Babasaheb Gopalrao Patil	Indian National Congress
1972	Babasaheb Gopalrao Patil	Indian National Congress
1978	Dinkarrao (Aba) Krishnaji Patil	Indian National Congress
1980	Dinkarrao (Aba) Krishnaji Patil	Independent politician
1985	Dinkarrao (Aba) Krishnaji Patil	Indian National Congress
1990	R. R. Patil	Indian National Congress
1995	R. R. Patil	Indian National Congress
1999	R. R. Patil	Nationalist Congress Party
2004	R. R. Patil	Nationalist Congress Party
2009 onwards : See Tasgaon-Kavathe Mahankal

== Election results ==
=== Assembly Election 2004 ===
2004 Maharashtra Legislative Assembly election : Tasgaon
Party	Candidate	Votes	%	±%
NCP	Raosaheb Ramrao Patil	70,483	50.36%	▲1.69
Independent	Sanjay Ramchandra Patil	64,179	45.86%	New
SS	Dr. Prataprao (Nana) Pandharinath Patil	2,211	1.58%	▼2.05
PWPI	Sankapal Popat Narayan	976	0.70%	New
Margin of victory		6,304	4.50%	▲1.42
Turnout		140,097	79.98%	▲0.82
Total valid votes		139,954		
Registered electors		175,174		▲18.98
NCP hold		Swing	▲1.69	

=== Assembly Election 1999 ===
1999 Maharashtra Legislative Assembly election : Tasgaon
Party	Candidate	Votes	%	±%
NCP	Raosaheb Ramrao Patil	55,166	48.67%	New
INC	Sanjay Ramchandra Patil	51,669	45.59%	▼20.66
SS	Sanjay Dattu Patil	4,119	3.63%	▲0.82
Independent	Balasaheb Alias Arun Yashwant Kulkarni	2,157	1.90%	New
Margin of victory		3,497	3.09%	▼38.45
Turnout		116,543	79.16%	▼4.17
Total valid votes		113,338		
Registered electors		147,229		▲2.23
NCP gain from INC		Swing	▼17.58	

=== Assembly Election 1995 ===
1995 Maharashtra Legislative Assembly election : Tasgaon
Party	Candidate	Votes	%	±%
INC	Raosaheb Ramrao Patil	79,505	66.25%	▲8.32
Independent	Dinkarrao (Aba) Krishnaji Patil	29,660	24.72%	New
SS	Tanaji Gulabrao Jadhav	3,374	2.81%	▼4.80
BBM	Dattatraya Pandurang Pandhare	3,102	2.58%	New
PWPI	Mallikarjun Shivling Kheradkar	3,066	2.55%	▼4.60
Independent	Balasaheb Narhari Eadake	848	0.71%	New
Margin of victory		49,845	41.54%	▲8.01
Turnout		122,020	84.72%	▲12.00
Total valid votes		120,006		
Registered electors		144,019		▲5.79
INC hold		Swing	▲8.32	

=== Assembly Election 1990 ===
1990 Maharashtra Legislative Assembly election : Tasgaon
Party	Candidate	Votes	%	±%
INC	Raosaheb Ramrao Patil	56,254	57.93%	▼23.50
Independent	Dasharath Maruti Alias D.M. Patil	23,699	24.40%	New
SS	Balasaheb Alias Arun Yashwant Kulkarni	7,389	7.61%	New
PWPI	Shivajirao Vinayak Shinde	6,952	7.16%	New
Independent	Vishvanath Sakharam Mahajan	2,236	2.30%	New
Margin of victory		32,555	33.52%	▼29.33
Turnout		98,811	72.58%	▲20.19
Total valid votes		97,108		
Registered electors		136,139		▲18.80
INC hold		Swing	▼23.50	

=== Assembly Election 1985 ===
1985 Maharashtra Legislative Assembly election : Tasgaon
Party	Candidate	Votes	%	±%
INC	Dinkarrao (Aba) Krishnaji Patil	47,722	81.43%	New
Independent	Amrutsagar Ganpati Abaji	10,885	18.57%	New
Margin of victory		36,837	62.85%	▲60.66
Turnout		59,746	52.14%	▼14.11
Total valid votes		58,607		
Registered electors		114,594		▲7.14
INC gain from Independent		Swing	▲45.31	

=== Assembly Election 1980 ===
1980 Maharashtra Legislative Assembly election : Tasgaon
Party	Candidate	Votes	%	±%
Independent	Dinkarrao (Aba) Krishnaji Patil	25,206	36.12%	New
INC(I)	Ganapatrao Nayaku Koli	23,678	33.93%	▲31.73
PWPI	Jaysingrao Madhavrao Mane Deshmukh	9,656	13.84%	▼1.82
INC(U)	Bhimrao Parwata Patil	8,926	12.79%	New
Independent	Shivajirao Pandurang Patil	2,324	3.33%	New
Margin of victory		1,528	2.19%	▼40.10
Turnout		71,528	66.87%	▼7.56
Total valid votes		69,790		
Registered electors		106,959		▲7.24
Independent gain from INC		Swing	▼26.10	

=== Assembly Election 1978 ===
1978 Maharashtra Legislative Assembly election : Tasgaon
Party	Candidate	Votes	%	±%
INC	Dinkarrao (Aba) Krishnaji Patil	45,178	62.22%	▼8.65
JP	Vasudev Daji Jadhav	14,471	19.93%	New
PWPI	Dattatraya Ganapati Pawar	11,370	15.66%	▼7.90
INC(I)	Shikru Babaji Khade	1,595	2.20%	New
Margin of victory		30,707	42.29%	▼5.03
Turnout		74,343	74.54%	▲2.36
Total valid votes		72,614		
Registered electors		99,737		▼5.56
INC hold		Swing	▼8.65	

=== Assembly Election 1972 ===
1972 Maharashtra Legislative Assembly election : Tasgaon
Party	Candidate	Votes	%	±%
INC	Babasaheb Gopalrao Patil	52,725	70.87%	▲15.48
PWPI	Jaysingrao Madhavrao Mane Deshmukh	17,524	23.56%	▼18.32
Independent	Patil Vasant Hindurao Patil	4,147	5.57%	New
Margin of victory		35,201	47.32%	▲33.80
Turnout		76,530	72.47%	▼6.81
Total valid votes		74,396		
Registered electors		105,609		▲17.10
INC hold		Swing	▲15.48	

=== Assembly Election 1967 ===
1967 Maharashtra Legislative Assembly election : Tasgaon
Party	Candidate	Votes	%	±%
INC	Babasaheb Gopalrao Patil	38,595	55.39%	▼6.61
PWPI	Ganpati Dada Lad	29,177	41.88%	▲6.40
ABJS	H. N. Patil	1,104	1.58%	▲0.94
Independent	M. A. Shinde	713	1.02%	New
Margin of victory		9,418	13.52%	▼13.01
Turnout		71,854	79.67%	▲0.52
Total valid votes		69,674		
Registered electors		90,189		▲29.70
INC hold		Swing	▼6.61	

=== Assembly Election 1962 ===
1962 Maharashtra Legislative Assembly election : Tasgaon
Party	Candidate	Votes	%	±%
INC	Dhondiram Yeshwant Patil	33,089	62.01%	▲18.14
PWPI	Ganpati Dada Lad	18,932	35.48%	▼20.65
PSP	Ganapati Nayaku Koli	999	1.87%	New
ABJS	Shankar Pandurang Sankpal	342	0.64%	New
Margin of victory		14,157	26.53%	▲14.27
Turnout		55,646	80.02%	▲0.26
Total valid votes		53,362		
Registered electors		69,538		▲20.68
INC gain from PWPI		Swing	▲5.88	

=== Assembly Election 1957 ===
1957 Bombay State Legislative Assembly election : Tasgaon
Party	Candidate	Votes	%	±%
PWPI	Ganpati Dada Lad	24,736	56.13%	New
INC	Dattajirao Bhaurao Suryawanshi	19,332	43.87%	New
Margin of victory		5,404	12.26%	
Turnout		44,068	76.48%	
Total valid votes		44,068		
Registered electors		57,620		
PWPI win (new seat)				

== See also ==
- List of constituencies of Maharashtra Legislative Assembly
