= Dhavali =

Village in Maharashtra

- village
- Location in Maharashtra, India Dhavali (India)
- Coordinates: 16°54′23.1″N 074°21′01.6″E
- Country: India
- State: Maharashtra
- District: Sangli
- Taluka: Walwa

Population (2011)
  - Total: 2,258

Languages
  - Official: Marathi
- Time zone: UTC+5:30 (IST)
- PIN: 416302

Dhavali is a panchayat village in the state of Maharashtra, India. Administratively, Dhavali is in Walwa Taluka, in the Sangli District of Maharashtra. Dhavali is the only village in its gram panchayat. The village of Dhavali is 23 km by road south of the city of Uran Islampur and 9 km by road west of the city of Ashta. In 2011, the population was 2258 persons, consisting of 1176 males and 1082 females in 477 families. The literacy rate is 88.15%
