= Islampur, Maharashtra Assembly constituency =

Constituency of the Maharashtra legislative assembly in India

Coordinates: 17.05°N 74.26°E

Ishwarpur
- Constituency No. 283 for the Maharashtra Legislative Assembly

Constituency details
- Country: India
- Region: Western India
- State: Maharashtra
- Division: Pune
- District: Sangli
- Lok Sabha constituency: Hatkanangle
- Established: 2008
- Total electors: 281,378
- Reservation: None

Member of Legislative Assembly
- 15th Maharashtra Legislative Assembly
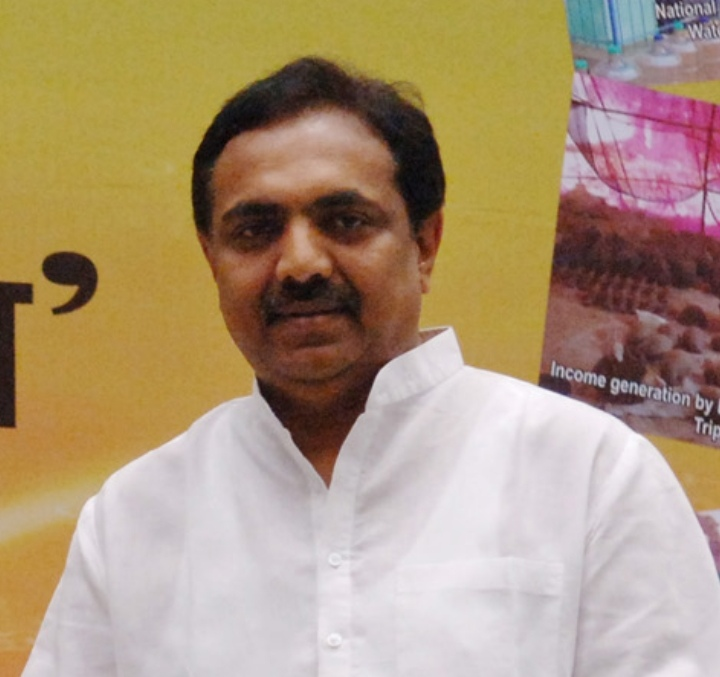
- Incumbent Jayant Rajaram Patil
- Party: NCP-SP
- Alliance: MVA
- Elected year: 2024
- Preceded by: Established in 2008

Islampur Assembly constituency is one of the 288 constituencies of Maharashtra Legislative Assembly, in India. It came into existence when assembly seat boundaries were redrawn in 2008, and it includes much of the area which was under a seat named Walva. It is a segment of Hatkanangle (Lok Sabha constituency). There is a vidhan sabha segment named Islampur in West Bengal as well.

== Members of the Legislative Assembly ==
Year	Member	Party
1952	Patil Sadashiv Dajee	Indian National Congress
1957–2008 onwards : See Walva
1957	Nagnath Naikwadi	Peasants and Workers Party
1962	Rajarambapu Patil	Indian National Congress
1967	Rajarambapu Patil	Indian National Congress
1972	Rajarambapu Patil	Indian National Congress
1978	Vilasrao Shinde	Indian National Congress
1980	Vishwasrao Patil	Janata Party
1985	Nagnath Naikwadi	Independent
1990	Jayant Patil	Indian National Congress
1995	Jayant Patil	Indian National Congress
1999	Jayant Patil	Nationalist Congress Party
2004	Jayant Patil	Nationalist Congress Party
2009	Jayant Patil	Nationalist Congress Party
2014	Jayant Patil	Nationalist Congress Party
2019	Jayant Patil	Nationalist Congress Party
2024	Jayant Patil	NCP-SP

== Election results ==
=== Assembly Election 2024 ===
2024 Maharashtra Legislative Assembly election : Islampur
Party	Candidate	Votes	%	±%
NCP-SP	Jayant Rajaram Patil	109,879	51.98	New
NCP	Nishikant Bhosale – Patil	96,852	45.82	New
NOTA	None of the above	1,042	0.49	▼0.11
Margin of victory		13,027	6.16	▼30.14
Turnout		212,438	75.50	▲1.70
Total valid votes		211,396		
Registered electors		281,378		▲3.72
NCP-SP gain from NCP		Swing	▼6.14	

=== Assembly Election 2019 ===
2019 Maharashtra Legislative Assembly election : Islampur
Party	Candidate	Votes	%	±%
NCP	Jayant Rajaram Patil	115,563	58.12	▼4.74
Independent	Nishikant Bhosale – Patil	43,394	21.83	New
SS	Gaurav Kiran Nayakawadi	35,668	17.94	New
VBA	Shakir Isalal Tamboli	2,295	1.15	New
NOTA	None of the above	1,196	0.60	▼0.01
Margin of victory		72,169	36.30	▼5.51
Turnout		200,210	73.80	▲1.16
Total valid votes		198,819		
Registered electors		271,278		▲8.48
NCP hold		Swing	▼4.74	

=== Assembly Election 2014 ===
2014 Maharashtra Legislative Assembly election : Islampur
Party	Candidate	Votes	%	±%
NCP	Jayant Rajaram Patil	113,045	62.86	▼1.75
Independent	Abhijit Shivajirao Patil	37,859	21.05	New
INC	Jitendra Laxman Patil	18,187	10.11	New
Independent	B. G. Patil	5,830	3.24	New
MNS	Udaysingh Pandarinath Patil	1,234	0.69	New
NOTA	None of the above	1,105	0.61	New
Margin of victory		75,186	41.81	▲9.99
Turnout		181,639	72.64	▼2.96
Total valid votes		179,835		
Registered electors		250,066		▲10.35
NCP hold		Swing	▼1.75	

=== Assembly Election 2009 ===
2009 Maharashtra Legislative Assembly election : Islampur
Party	Candidate	Votes	%	±%
NCP	Jayant Rajaram Patil	110,673	64.61	New
Independent	Vaibhav Nagnath Naikwadi	56,165	32.79	New
SBP	Sanjay Kole	2,537	1.48	New
BSP	Gautam Gulab Laute	1,931	1.13	New
Margin of victory		54,508	31.82	▲12.19
Turnout		171,312	75.60	▲11.68
Total valid votes		171,306		
Registered electors		226,614		▲324.12
NCP gain from INC		Swing	▲17.45	

=== Assembly Election 1952 ===
1952 Bombay State Legislative Assembly election : Islampur
Party	Candidate	Votes	%	±%
INC	Patil Sadashiv Dajee	16,108	47.16	New
Kamgar Kisan Paksha	Naikwadi Nagnath Ramu	9,403	27.53	New
Independent	Patil Anna Appaji	5,078	14.87	New
Independent	Shelke Chandrasen Bhujang	2,835	8.30	New
Independent	Shinde Atmaram Ganpati	729	2.13	New
Margin of victory		6,705	19.63	
Turnout		34,153	63.92	
Total valid votes		34,153		
Registered electors		53,431		
INC win (new seat)				

== See also ==
- Walva Assembly constituency
- List of constituencies of Maharashtra Legislative Assembly
