= Wategaon =

- town
- Location in Maharashtra, India
- Coordinates: 17°6′8.00″N 74°9′40.00″E
- Country: India
- State: Maharashtra
- District: Sangli

Government
  - Type: Gram Panchyat
- Elevation: 570 m (1,870 ft)

Languages
  - Official: Marathi
- Time zone: UTC+5:30 (IST)
- PIN: 415410
- Telephone code: 02342
- Vehicle registration: MH10
- Nearest city: Islampur Karad
- Lok Sabha constituency: Hatkanangle
- Vidhan Sabha constituency: Shirala

Wategaon is a town in Sangli district, Maharashtra, India. Wategaon (pop. 4,255) is a village in walva taluka 16 kilometres (9.9 mi) (ten miles) west of Islampur and about 10 kilometres (6.2 mi) northwest of Peth.

== Notable residents ==
- Annabhau Sathe, social reformer and writer was born there in 1920.
