= Walwa =

Walwa may refer to:

- Walwa, Victoria, Australia
- Walwa, Sangli, Maharashtra, India
