= Rohit Patil =

Indian politician

Member of the Maharashtra Legislative Assembly
- Incumbent
- Assumed office 23 November 2024
- Preceded by: Suman Patil
- Constituency: Tasgaon-Kavathe Mahankal

Chief Whip of NCP(SP)
- In office 2 December 2024 – Incumbent

Personal details
- Party: NCP(SP)
- Spouse: Unmarried
- Occupation: Politician

Rohit Raosaheb Patil (born 4 July 1999) is an Indian politician from Maharashtra. He is a first time member of the Maharashtra Legislative Assembly from Tasgaon-Kavathe Mahankal Assembly constituency in Sangli district representing Nationalist Congress Party (Sharadchandra Pawar) after winning the 2024 Maharashtra Legislative Assembly election. He became the youngest member of the legislative assembly.

== Early life and education ==
Patil is from Tasgaon, Sangli district, Maharashtra. He was born to R. R. Patil, former deputy chief minister, and Suman Patil. He completed his BBA at NMIMS, Mumbai.

== Career ==
Patil made his electoral debut winning the 2024 Maharashtra Legislative Assembly election representing Nationalist Congress Party (SP) from Tasgaon-Kavathe Mahankal Assembly constituency. He polled 128,403 votes and defeated his nearest rival and former MP of Sangli, Sanjaykaka Patil of Nationalist Congress Party, by a margin of 27,644 votes. Sanjaykaka is an old foe of his father.
