= Balu Ananda Chopade =

Indian academic

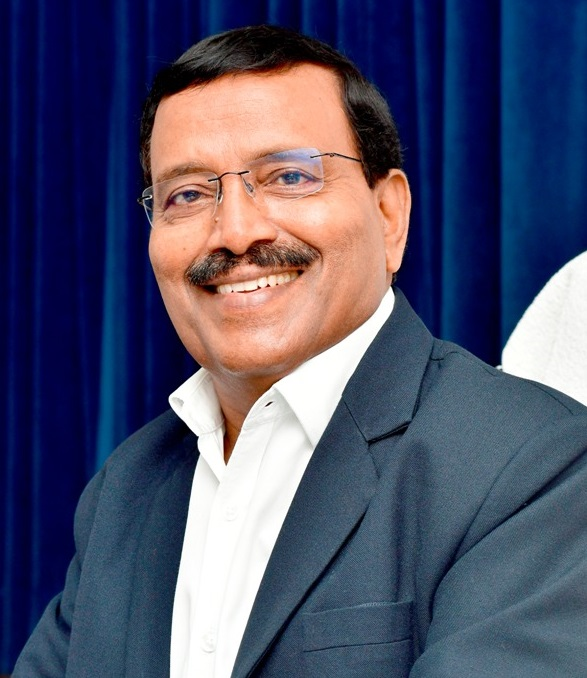
- B. A. Chopade in 2025

AKS University, Satna
- Incumbent
- Assumed office 2023

Dr. Babasaheb Ambedkar Marathwada University, Sambhaji Nagar, Maharashtra, India.
- In office 2014–2019

Personal details
- Education: Shivaji University,Savitribai Phule Pune University, University of Nottingham, England; University of Illinois, Chicago
- Occupation: Academician
- Profession: Scientist

Balu Ananda Chopade is an academician, microbiologist, and scientist who is currently serving as Vice-Chancellor of AKS University, Satna, Madhya Pradesh. Previously, he served as the Vice-Chancellor of Dr. Babasaheb Ambedkar Marathwada University, Sambhaji Nagar, Maharashtra for the term 2014-2019. He also served as the Director of Institute of Bioinformatics and Biotechnology (IBB), head, Department of Microbiology, over one decade at Savitribai Phule Pune University.

== Life and career ==
He was born on 1 July 1956 in Karad, Maharashtra, India. He completed his bachelor's degree (B.Sc.) in Microbiology from Shivaji University, Kolhapur, master's degree (microbiology) from Savitribai Phule Pune University, Pune, and a PhD in Microbiology from the Department of Microbiology, Queens Medical Center, University of Nottingham, England. Government of USA awarded him the most prestigious Fogarty International research award (1994-1996) of National Institute of Health (NIH) for research on genetic engineering at University of Illinois, Chicago and subsequently returned to India and rejoined S.P Pune University and became Director of Institute of Biotechnology and Bioinformatics (IBB). His contributions are centered on the Acinetobacter group of microorganisms in the field of Plasmid DNA transfer, agriculture, medicine and nanotechnology. He is known for his contributions in demonstrating the Pra gene homolog of the Ras oncogene in Pseudomonas aeruginosa. His research supported new methods of gene transfer through the outer membrane vesicle of Acinetobacter baylyi. Research by him also helped establish Acinetobacter as plant growth-promoting rhizobacteria (PGPR) and a model system for nanotechnology among microorganisms.

== Patents ==
- Chopade, B. A; Huddedar, S.B; Shete, A.M; Tilekar, J. N; Gore, S. D. and Dhavale, D.D; (2008). Plasmid encoding IAA and method thereof. United States Patent 7341868.
- Chopade Balu Ananda, Suchitra Vishal Mokashi, Karishma Pardesi (2013) Process for the preparation of syrup from Neera, a sweet sap obtained from palm tree particularly Phoenix sylvestris. Indian Patent No. 417597.

== Books ==
- Chopade B. A (2017) Bharat Ratna Dr. B.R. Ambedkar: Unique Thinker of 20th Century. Published by Dr. B.A.M. University, Aurangabad and Bhaishya Prakashan, Mumbai, India. ISBN No.:978-93-83206-02-5
- Ghosh. S and Chopade B. A (2017) Dioscorea bulbifera: A Model System in Nano Biotechnology and Medicine. Lambert Academic Publishing, Germany. ISBN No.: 9783-330-05529-2
- Chopade B. A (2016) Chief Editor, Navyugnirmate, Bharat Ratna Dr. Babasaheb Ambedkar and Kailash Publications Aurangabad, Maharashtra, India. ISBN No. 978-93-844451-84-4
- Chopade B. A (2009) Editor, Wealth of India, Volume on Biodiversity, Published by NISCAIR, CSIR, Govt of India, New Delhi, India. ISBN No. 81-85038-00-7

== Recognition ==
- Most Outstanding Vice-Chancellor in India (2016) by World Education Congress in Mumbai
- Bronze Medal conferred by International Genetically Engineered Machines (iGEM) (2009), Massachusetts Institute of Technology (MIT).
- Lifetime Achievement Award, awarded by National Institute of Cleanliness Education and Research (NICER), (2009)
