= Vashi, Sangli =

Village in Maharashtra

Vashi Washi
- village
- Location in Maharashtra, India Vashi (India)
- Coordinates: 16°57′21″N 074°13′48″E
- Country: India
- State: Maharashtra
- District: Sangli
- Taluka: Walwa

Government
  - Type: Grampanchayat
  - Body: Vashi Grampanchayat

Population (2011)
  - Total: 3,489

Languages
  - Official: Marathi
- Time zone: UTC+5:30 (IST)
- PIN: 415409

Vashi is a Village in the state of Maharashtra, India. Administratively, Vashi is under Walwa Taluka of Sangli District in Maharashtra. Vashi is the only village in its gram panchayat. The village of Vashi is 21 km by road south of the city of Uran Islampur and 33 km by road west of the city of Ashta.

== Demographics ==
In the 2001 India census, the village of Vashi had 3,332 inhabitants. 1,681 (50.5%) were males and 1,651 (49.5%) were females, for a gender ratio of 982 females per thousand males.

In the 2011 census, the village of Vashi had 3,489 inhabitants. 1008 Digambar Jain Temple is very famous pilgrim centre for Jain samaj.
