= Detective Dhananjay: Rahasyajaal =

2025 series by Shrirang Godbole

- Genre: Crime; Thriller
- Written by: Girish Joshi
- Directed by: Shrirang Godbole
- Starring: Adinath Kothare; Pushkaraj Chirputkar
- Music by: Shubham Bhat
- Country of origin: India
- Original language: Marathi
- No. of seasons: 1
- No. of episodes: 7

Production
- Executive producers: Hemant Patil; Abhijeet Shinde
- Cinematography: Arjun Sorte
- Editor: Mayuresh Bavare
- Camera setup: Multi-camera
- Running time: 22–33 minutes
- Production companies: Indian Magic Eye; Storyteller's Nook

Original release
- Network: Zee5
- Release: 1 May 2026

Detective Dhananjay: Rahasyajaal is a 2026 Indian Marathi-language crime thriller web series directed by Shrirang Godbole and written by Girish Joshi. Based on the detective novel ''Rahasyajaal'' by Baburao Arnalkar, the series stars Adinath Kothare in the titular role of Detective Dhananjay, with Pushkaraj Chirputkar portraying his assistant, Chotu. The series is produced by Indian Magic Eye and Storyteller's Nook and premiered on ZEE5 on 1 May 2026.

== Premise ==
Set in the fictional town of Shirgaon, the series follows Dhananjay, a sharp-witted private detective who becomes involved in a complex murder investigation. As he races against time to prove the innocence of a man wrongfully accused of the crime, Dhananjay uncovers a web of secrets, deception and hidden motives. The series explores not only the identity of the perpetrator but also the motives and circumstances surrounding the murder.

== Cast ==
- Adinath Kothare as Detective Dhananjay
- Pushkaraj Chirputkar as Chotu
- Rajendra Shisatkar as Inspector Ghatpande
- Payal Jadhav as Meenakshi
- Umesh Jagtap as Deshmukh
- Shubhankar Ekbote as Sadanand
- Deepak Karanjikar as Inamdar
- Aparna Chothe as Swati
- Chitra Khare as Adv. Kadam
- Nitin Dixit as Krushnaji Rao
- Gauri Kadu as Dr. Aruna
- Jayesh Sanghvi as Inspector Raje
- Anthony Uchenna Uzomma as Pamelo
- Prashant Gite as Constable Surve
- Shirang Godbole as Mr. Mehta
- Girish Joshi as Mehandale
- Rucha Kelkar as Revati

== Episodes ==
No.	Title	Original release date	Length
1	"Blood Stained Question"	1 May 2026	24 minutes
A murder case begins to unfold as Dhananjay is asked to step in and investigate.
2	"Guilty or Not"	1 May 2026	29 minutes
The accused man's innocence is questioned as new evidence complicates the case.
3	"Beneath the Surface"	1 May 2026	26 minutes
Dhananjay uncovers hidden connections that point towards a larger conspiracy.
4	"The Serpent Temple"	1 May 2026	24 minutes
The clues lead to a mysterious location that reveals deeper secrets behind the crimes.
5	"Mind Games"	1 May 2026	22 minutes
Ghatpande unlocks a hidden basement and discovers Meenakshi’s debts and link to Krishnaji Rao’s death.
6	"The Mastermind"	1 May 2026	26 minutes
A hidden diamond facility is discovered, revealing Krishnaji’s heart attack was murder, while the mastermind remains at large.
7	"The End Is the Beginning"	1 May 2026	33 minutes
Dark-web clues reveal the servant’s role in the blood-diamond ring, as Dhananjay forces the real killer to surrender.

== Production ==
=== Background ===
The series is based on Dhananjay, a fictional detective created by Marathi writer Baburao Arnalkar (born Chandrakant Sakharam Chavan), who wrote hundreds of mystery novels. Hema V. R., Chief Channel Officer of Zee Marathi and business head of Marathi ZEE5, said that the series was developed as a contemporary adaptation of Arnalkar's literary character.

In October 2025, Adinath Kothare announced that he would portray Dhananjay, marking his first role as a detective, and would also serve as a producer on the series. The project was announced as a ZEE5 Marathi Original, co-produced by Shrirang Godbole's Indian Magic Eye and Kothare's Storytellers Nook.

=== Cast and characterization ===
Kothare described Dhananjay as a character who observes and listens before taking action, while Chotu, his associate in the original books, is portrayed with expertise in technology and cybercrime. Kothare and Pushkaraj Chirputkar described the relationship between Dhananjay and Chotu as contrasting in temperament, with Chotu being more emotional while Dhananjay is more practical and intuitive.

=== Filming ===
Principal photography commenced with a mahurat ceremony in Mumbai in November 2025. The series was filmed in Bhor, Maharashtra, where a fictional village named Shirgaon was built for the production.

== Release and reception ==
ZEE5 announced the series on 21 April 2026, with the premiere scheduled for 1 May 2026. The official trailer was released on 22 April 2026. All seven episodes were released simultaneously on the platform on 1 May 2026, with English subtitles.

=== Critical response ===
Divesh Chavan of Navarashtra observed, "While watching this series, one thing is noticeable that the pace of the plot slows down a bit, but actor Adinath Kothare's restrained acting and effective use of technology keep the audience engaged."
