= Kumathe =

Village in Maharashtra

- City
- Location in Maharashtra, India Kumathe (India)
- Coordinates: 16.960°N 74.651°E
- Country: India
- State: Maharashtra
- District: Sangli

Population (2008)
  - Total: 10,000

Languages
  - Official: Marathi
- Time zone: UTC+5:30 (IST)
- PIN: 416306
- Telephone code: 02346
- Vehicle registration: MH-10
- Nearest city: Tasgaon, Sangli
- Lok Sabha constituency: Sangli
- Vidhan Sabha constituency: Tasgaon
- Climate: Dry and Arid (Köppen)
- Website: maharashtra.gov.in

Kumathe is a village in the tehsil Tasgaon of Sangli district, Maharashtra, India, about 18 kilometres north of Sangli. Its situated along the Sangli-Tasgaon state highway.

== Geography and Environment ==
Kumathe is situated on the bank of water stream. It the main-old village is dense populated area which is situated alongside stream. While the newer expanding area of village is towards north side along matkunki road, area which has more height than old base village. Rainfall is average in the village and there is no critical water scarcity in the village. There is the more-than-800-year-old Narsingha Temple.

== Farming ==
Farmers majorly took grape production. Known for its quality grapes exporting to Europe and Arab countries. Average per capita income is more than state average income. There is biggest production of grapes and dry grapes.

== Education ==
Literacy rate is around 90%. Village is known for its high intelligent quotient. Has primary schools, a high school and vocational education facilities.
