= Suman Patil =

Indian politician

Maharashtra Legislative Assembly
- In office 2015–2024
- Preceded by: R. R. Patil
- Constituency: Tasgaon-Kavathe Mahankal

Personal details
- Party: NCP(SP)
- Spouse: R. R. Patil
- Children: 3 including Rohit Patil
- Occupation: Politician

Suman Patil is an Indian politician and sits as a member of the Maharashtra Legislative Assembly. She was elected in place of her late husband, RR Patil and won by a record number of votes.

== Personal life ==
Suman Patil married R. R. Patil, an Indian politician from the state of Maharashtra. He died on 16 February 2015, aged 57. Together, they had three children Smita, Supriya and Rohit Patil.

== Positions held ==
- Member of the Maharashtra Legislative Assembly
- She was elected as MLA from Tasgaon in 2014 and 2019
