= Rajarambapu Patil =

Indian politician (1920–1984)

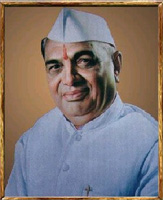

Member of the Maharashtra Legislative Assembly
- In office (1962-1967), (1967-1972), (1972 – 1978)
- Preceded by: Nagnath Naikwadi
- Succeeded by: Vilasrao Shinde
- Constituency: Walva Assembly constituency

Member of the Maharashtra Legislative Council
- In office (1978–1984)

Personal details
- Born: 1 August 1920
- Died: 17 January 1984 (aged 63)
- Spouse: Kusumtai Patil
- Children: Jayant Patil Usha Tanpure
- Education: L.L.B .
- Occupation: Politician

Rajarambapu Patil (1 August 1920 – 17 January 1984) was an Indian politician from Walwa, Sangli, Maharashtra.

== Personal life ==
Rajaram (Bapu) Anant Patil was born on 1 August 1920 at Kasegaon in Walwa, Sangli Taluka of Sangli District. His education is LL. B. was up to He worked underground in the freedom movement of 1942. Rajarambapu Patil founded the Kasegaon Education Institute in 1945 and started secondary schools and colleges. Taking the idea that the life of the common man in the village should stand on the foundation of knowledge, Bapu set up a network of educational institutions in Valwa taluka.

== Political career ==
He established engineering and technical colleges, he tried to change the economic condition of the farmers by starting a co-operative sugar factory on the desolate plantation of Sakharle.He established the Walwa Dairy Union at Islampur to get the milk of the farmers at a fair price market. Considering the farmer as the center, he set the ideal of cooperation by setting up various institutions like sugar factories, cooperative banks, milk unions, consumer stores, yarn mills, water supply institutions

Rajarambapu Patil was the Secretary of Sangli District Committee in 1957 and President of Congress Maharashtra Pradesh Congress in 1959–60. He was the President of South Satara District Local Board from 1952 to 1962. Patil was elected to the Maharashtra Legislative Assembly from Walwa constituency in Sangli district in 1962, 1967 and 1972 and to the Maharashtra Legislative Council from 1978 to 1984. Between 1962 and 1980, he served as Minister of Revenue, Energy, Industry, Rural Development, Law and Justice and Information and Public Relations.
