= Nana Patil =

Indian independence activist

Krantisinh Nana Patil
- Born: 3 August 1900 Sangli, British India
- Died: 6 December 1976 Walwa, India (aged 76)
- Other name: Krantisinh
- Occupations: Freedom fighter, revolutionary, parliamentarian
- Organization(s): • Hindustan Socialist Republican Association • Prarthana Samaj
- Political party: Communist Party of India
- Other political affiliations: • Indian National Congress • Peasants and Workers Party of India
- Movement: • Indian Independence Movement • Samyukta Maharashtra Movement

Member of Parliament, Lok Sabha
- In office 1957-1962
- Preceded by: Venkantrao Pawar
- Succeeded by: Kisan Mahadeo Veer
- Constituency: Satara
- In office 1967-1971
- Preceded by: Dwarkadasji Mantri
- Succeeded by: Sayajirao Pandit
- Constituency: Beed

Nana Patil (Nana Ramchandra Pisal Patil) (3 August 1900 - 6 December 1976) popularly known as Krantisinh ( lit. 'revolutionary lion'), was an Indian independence activist, freedom fighter and Member of Parliament for the Communist Party of India representing Beed district of Marathwada region. He was a source of inspiration for the people. Earlier, he had been a founder of the revolutionary Prati-Sarkar formed in Yedemachindra Sangli district of west Maharashtra. Krantisinh Nana Patil established a parallel government in Satara district. He died on 6 December 1976.

== British Raj period ==
Nana Patil was born on 3 August 1900 at Yedemachindra, Maharashtra. His full name was Nana Ramchandra Pisal and he was a founding member of the Hindustan Republican Association who went underground between 1929 and 1932. Patil was imprisoned eight or nine times during the struggle with the British Raj from 1932 to 1942. He went underground for a second time for 44 months during the Quit India Movement in 1942. He was active mainly in Tasgaon, Khanapur, Walva and south Karad talukas in Sangli district. For a few months he stayed in the village of Dhankawadi, Purandhar, and received help from the then-Patil (village headman), Shamrao Takawale. Patil's method was direct attack on the colonial government and was widely accepted in the district.

== Connections with Prarthana Samaj ==
In 1919, Patil began his social work with Prarthana Samaj for the development of depressed classes and creating awareness against blind faith and harmful traditions. He spent ten years working for the Prarthana Samaj and the associated Satyashodhak Samaj. During this period he started welfare initiatives such as 'samaj-vivah' (low budget marriage) and bhaiyya education. He was against the casteism and throughout his life he fought for the right of the poor and farmers. He taught them to avoid extra expenses incurred in traditional marriage ceremonies and festivals; he also advised them to avoid taking loans and also emphasized the importance of education for social development.

== Political career ==
Patil started his public life in the Indian National Congress but in 1948 joined the Peasants and Workers Party of India with Shankarrao More, Keshavrao Jedhe, Bhausaheb Raut, Madhavrao Bagal. He got a ticket from Communist Party of India in 1957 to contest the Lok Sabha elections in the Satara constituency and in 1967 from Beed constituency. He was successful in 1957 and 1967.

Patil also fought along with Aacharya Atre for the creation of the state of Maharashtra.
