= Upalavi =

Village in Maharashtra

- City
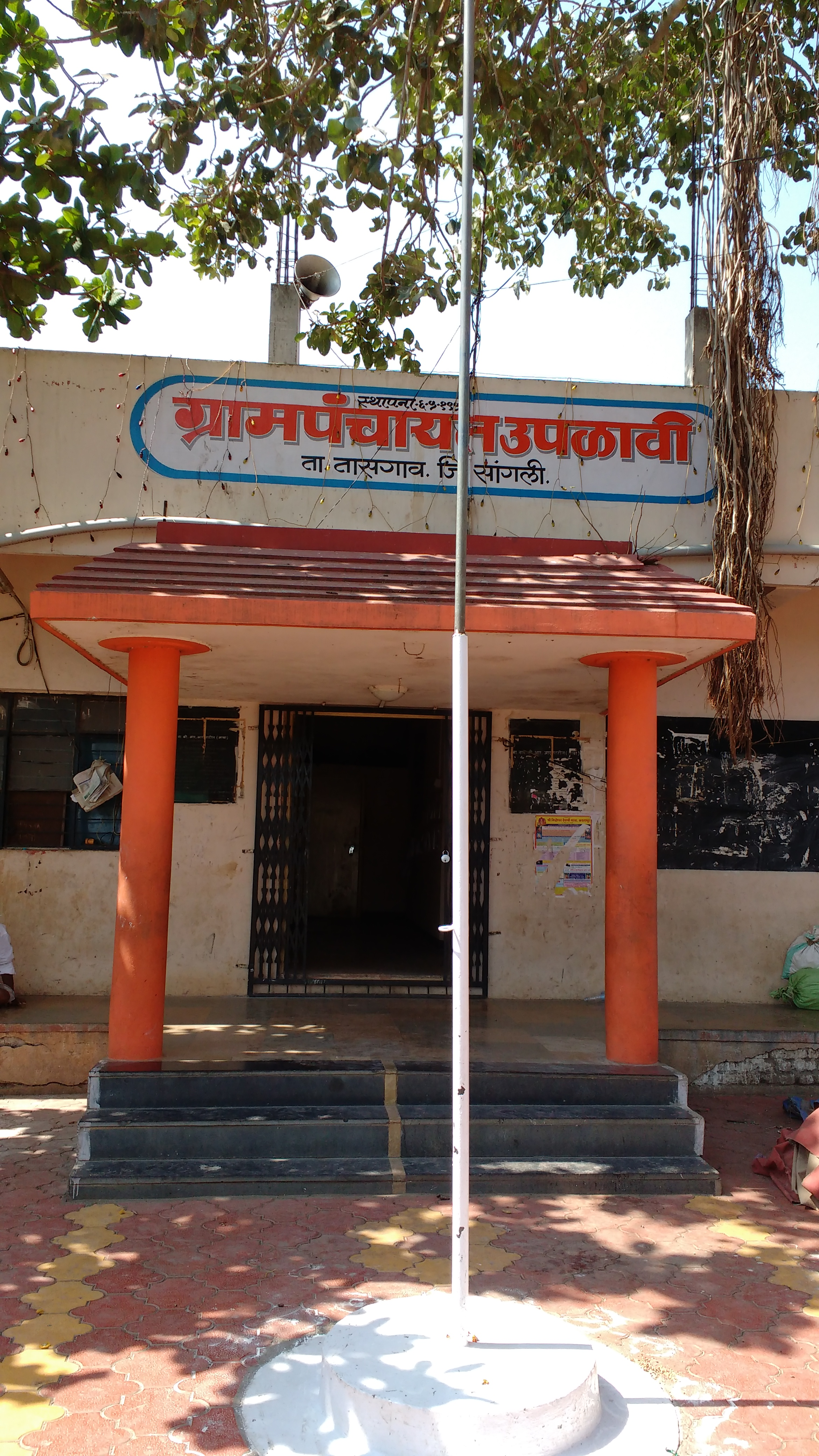
- Upalavi Grampanchyat

- Location in Maharashtra, India
- Coordinates: 16.982838°N 74.675703°E
- Country: India
- State: Maharashtra
- District: Sangli

Government
  - Type: Grampanchyat
  - Body: Grampanchyat
  - Sarpanch: Asharani kadam

Area
  - Total: 118.18 km^{2} (45.63 sq mi)
- Elevation: 549 m (1,801 ft)

Population (2008)
  - Total: 6,000
  - Rank: 91
  - Density: 51/km^{2} (130/sq mi)
- Demonym: Upalavikar

Languages
  - Official: Marathi
  - Second Language: Hindi (हिंदी)
  - Third Language: English
- Time zone: UTC+5:30 (IST)
- PIN: 416306
- Telephone code: 02346
- Vehicle registration: MH-10
- Nearest city: Tasgaon, Sangli
- Lok Sabha constituency: Sangli
- Vidhan Sabha constituency: Tasgaon and Kavathemahankal
- Climate: Dry and Arid (Köppen)
- Distance from Sangli: 19 km (12 mi)
- Distance from Tasgaon: 10 km (6.2 mi)

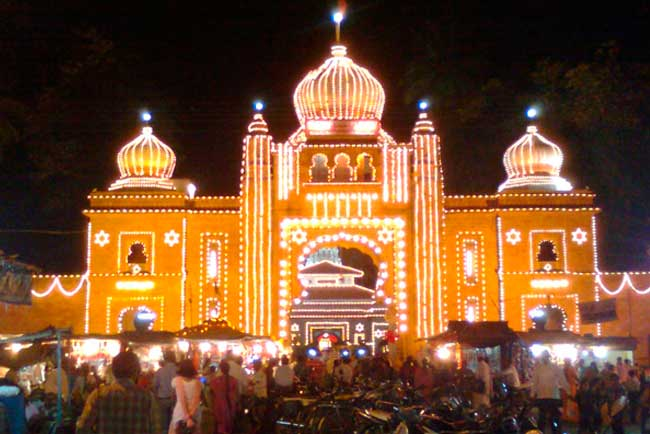
Ganpati Temple, Heart of Sangli City

Upalavi (Village ID 568674) is a village in the Tehsil tasgaon of Sangli district, Maharashtra, India, about 18 kilometres north of Sangli. It is situated along the Sangli-Tasgaon state highway.

According to the 2011 census it has a population of 1669 living in 1720 households.

== Geography and Environment ==
Upalavi is situated on the bank of water stream. It the main-old village is dense populated area which is situated alongside stream. While the newer expanding area of village is towards north side along matkunki road, area which has more height than old base village. Rainfall is average in the village and there is no critical water scarcity in the village. There is the 250+-year-old Sidheshwara Temple and Hanuman Temple.

== Location ==
It belongs to Desh or Paschim Maharashtra region. It belongs to Pune Division. It is located 20 km towards North from District headquarters Sangli. It is 12 km from Tasgaon. 348 km from State capital Mumbai Upalavi Pin code is 416306 and postal head office is Kavalapur Soni (3 km), Kumthe (4 km), Nagaon Kavate (4 km), Matkunki (4 km), Bhose (6 km) are nearby villages. Upalavi is surrounded by Miraj Taluka towards the south, Sangli Taluka towards the south, Kavathemahankal Taluka towards the east, and Palus Taluka towards the west. Tasgaon, Miraj, Sangli, and Vita are nearby cities.

== Farming ==
The majority of the farmers are involved in the production of grapes and raisins, which are exported to Europe and Arab countries. The average per capita income is more than state average income.

== Education ==
Literacy rate is around 90%. The village has primary schools, a high school, and vocational education facilities.

- New English School Upalavi & Junior College
- Zilha Parishad Shala Upalavi
