= D N Dhanagare =

Indian sociologis (1936-2017)

D. N. Dhanagare
- Born: 11 June 1936; Washim, Maharashtra, India
- Died: 7 March 2017 (aged 80); Pune, Maharashtra, India
- Education: Nagpur University, India, University of Massachusetts US, University of Sussex (U.K),

Professor D. N. Dhanagare (11 June 1936 – 7 March 2017) was an Indian sociologist who specialised in farmers' movements and rural sociology.

Dhanagare died of heart failure on 7 March 2017. He was survived by two sons.

== Education ==
Dhanagare received his master's degree from Nagpur University and a D.Phil at the University of Sussex, UK.

== Career ==
He was Vice-Chancellor of Shivaji University in Kohlapur. Besides teaching in Agra University, Indian Institute of Technology Kanpur, Pune University, Dhanagare has been the President of the Indian Sociological Society, He was a Life Member of the Indian Institute of Public Administration, Marathi Samajshastra Parishad, People's Union of Civil Liberties, Indian Association of Social Sciences and a Member of International Sociological Association. He was a Member Secretary of Indian Council of Social Science Research, New Delhi.

During 2012–2014, Dhanagare was a National Fellow at Indian Institute of Advanced Study, Rashtrapati Nivas, Shimla.

== Recognition ==
Dhanagare received the 2011 Indian Sociological Society Life Time Achievement Award. He was awarded a Commonwealth Scholarship and an I.C.H.R Fellowship. He was Visiting Asian Scholar at the Scandinavian Institute of Asian Studies in Copenhagen (1983), UGC National Lecturer, Visiting Research Professor, Tokyo University of Foreign Studies and received a Shastri Indo-Canadian Institute's Visiting Fellowship in Canada.

== Publications ==
- 1975. Agrarian movements and Gandhian politics. Institute of Social Sciences, Agra University
- 1983. Peasant Movements in India: 1920-1950. New Delhi: Oxford University Press.
- 1998. Themes And Perspectives in Indian Sociology. New Delhi: Rawat Publications.
- 2014* The Writings of D. N. Dhanagare"', Orient Blackswan
- 2016* "'Populism and Power':Farmers' movement in western India'" 1980–2014, Routledge : India
