= Jayant Patil =

Indian politician (born February 1962)

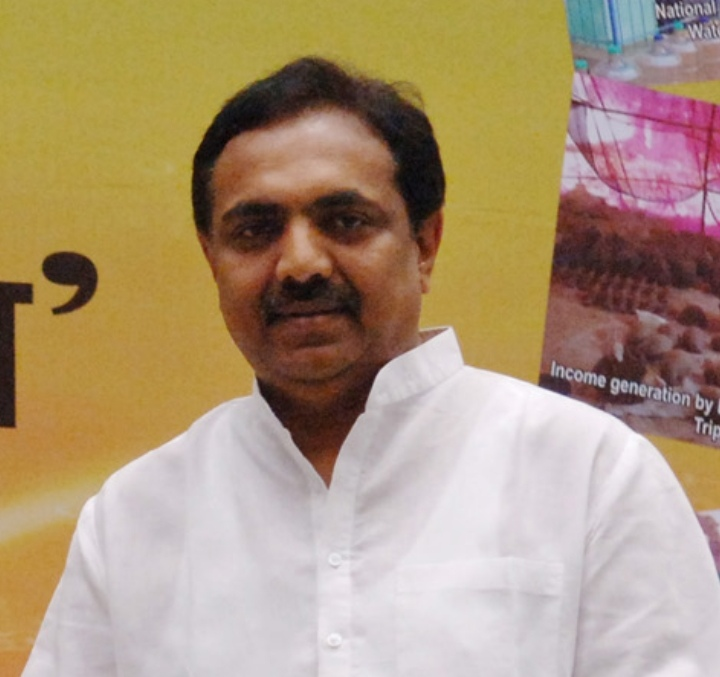
- Patil in 2013

Deputy Leader of the Opposition Maharashtra Legislative Assembly
- In office 23 December 2014 – 20 April 2018
- Governor: C. Vidyasagar Rao; Bhagat Singh Koshyari
- Chief Minister: Devendra Fadnavis
- Leader of the Opposition: Radhakrishna Vikhe-Patil
- Speaker of the House: Haribhau Bagade
- Succeeded by: Shashikant Shinde

Cabinet Minister Government of Maharashtra
- In office 30 December 2019 – 29 June 2022
- Minister: Water Resources; Command Area Development
- Governor: Bhagat Singh Koshyari
- Cabinet: Thackeray ministry
- Chief Minister: Uddhav Thackeray
- Deputy CM: Ajit Pawar
- Guardian Minister: Sangli District
- In office 28 November 2019 – 30 December 2019
- Minister: Finance; Planning; Housing; Public Health and Family Welfare; Co-operation; Marketing; Labour; Food, Civil Supplies and Consumer Protection; Minority Development and Aukaf
- Governor: Bhagat Singh Koshyari
- Cabinet: Thackeray ministry
- Chief Minister: Uddhav Thackeray
- In office 11 November 2010 – 26 September 2014
- Minister: Rural Development; Labour; Ports Development
- Governor: K. Sankaranarayanan; Om Prakash Kohli (additional charge); C. Vidyasagar Rao
- Cabinet: Prithviraj Chavan ministry
- Chief Minister: Prithviraj Chavan
- Deputy CM: Ajit Pawar
- Guardian Minister: Sangli District; Akola District
- In office 7 November 2009 – 9 November 2010
- Minister: Rural Development; Environment and Climate Change; State Border Defence
- Governor: S. C. Jamir; K. Sankaranarayanan
- Cabinet: Second Ashok Chavan ministry
- Chief Minister: Ashok Chavan
- Deputy CM: Chhagan Bhujbal
- In office 8 December 2008 – 6 November 2009
- Minister: Home Affairs
- Governor: S. C. Jamir
- Cabinet: First Ashok Chavan ministry
- Chief Minister: Ashok Chavan
- Deputy CM: Chhagan Bhujbal
- In office 1 November 2004 – 4 December 2008
- Minister: Finance; Special Assistance; Special Backward Classes Welfare
- Governor: Mohammed Fazal; S. M. Krishna; S. C. Jamir
- Cabinet: Second Deshmukh ministry
- Chief Minister: Vilasrao Deshmukh
- Deputy CM: R. R. Patil
- In office 18 January 2003 – 4 November 2004
- Minister: Finance
- Governor: Mohammed Fazal
- Cabinet: Sushilkumar Shinde ministry
- Chief Minister: Sushilkumar Shinde
- Deputy CM: Chhagan Bhujbal (2003); Vijaysingh Mohite-Patil (2003–04)
- In office 18 October 1999 – 16 January 2003
- Minister: Finance; Planning
- Governor: P. C. Alexander; Mohammed Fazal
- Cabinet: First Deshmukh ministry
- Chief Minister: Vilasrao Deshmukh
- Deputy CM: Chhagan Bhujbal

Member of the Maharashtra Legislative Assembly
- Incumbent
- Assumed office 1 March 1990
- Preceded by: Nagnath Naikwadi
- Parliamentary group: Nationalist Congress Party – Sharadchandra Pawar
- Constituency: Islampur-Walva (Ishwarpur)

Personal details
- Born: Jayant Rajaram Patil; 16 February 1962 (age 64)
- Party: NCP (SP) (2024–present)
Party Political Offices
Leader of NCP (SP) Maharashtra Legislative Assembly
In office 24 November 2019 – 1 December 2024
National President	Sharad Pawar
Preceded by	Ajit Pawar
Succeeded by	Jitendra Awhad
State President of NCP (SP) in the Maharashtra
In office 8 February 2024 – 15 July 2025
National President	Sharad Pawar
Preceded by	Sunil Tatkare
Succeeded by	Shashikant Shinde
Parliamentary group	NCP (SP)
- Other political affiliations: Nationalist Congress Party (1999–2024); Indian National Congress (Before 1999)
- Spouse: Shailaja Patil
- Children: (2 Sons) Prateek Patil; Rajvardhan Patil
- Parent: Rajarambapu Patil (father)
- Education: Balmohan Vidyamandir Veermata Jijabai Technological Institute (B.Tech)
- Occupation: Politician
- Website: https://www.jayantpatil.com/

Jayant Rajarambapu Patil (born 16 February 1962) is an Indian politician from the state of Maharashtra. He has been representing Islampur (Vidhan Sabha constituency) in the Maharashtra Legislative Assembly for more than three decades. He was the Cabinet minister of the Water Resources Department in Uddhav Thackeray ministry. Earlier, he served as the Rural Development Minister (2009 to 2014), the Finance Minister (1999 to 2008) and the Home Minister (2008 to 2009) of Maharashtra.

== Early life and education ==
Patil is the younger son of former Maharashtra cabinet minister and veteran Congress leader, Rajarambapu Patil. After his victory in the 1962 Maharashtra Legislative Assembly election his father named him as Jayant, which means victory. He completed his bachelor in civil engineering from the Veermata Jijabai Technological Institute and later did his masters at the New Jersey Institute of Technology, US. He returned to India after the death of his father in 1984. He served as the President of the Kasegaon Education Society and the chairman of the Walwa Sugar Cooperation.

== Entry into politics ==
Patil became an MLA for the first time winning the 1990 Maharashtra Legislative Assembly election representing the Indian National Congress from Walwa in the Sangli District. Since then, he has represented Islampur-Walwa constituency seven times. After the split from Congress in 1999, the Patil Troika joined Sharad Pawar.

Formation of Nationalist Congress Party

In 1999, after the 12th Lok Sabha was dissolved and elections to the 13th Lok Sabha were called, Sharad Pawar, P. A. Sangma, and Tariq Anwar demanded that the party needed to propose someone native-born as the prime ministerial candidate and not the Italian-born Sonia Gandhi, who had entered party politics and replaced Sitaram Kesri as Congress president. In response, the Congress Working Committee (CWC) expelled the trio for six years from the party.

In response Pawar and Sangma founded the Nationalist Congress Party in June 1999. Despite the falling out, the new party aligned with the Congress party to form a coalition government in Maharashtra after the 1999 Maharashtra Legislative Assembly election to prevent the Shiv Sena-BJP combine from returning to power. Sharad Pawar, however, did not return to state politics and Vilasrao Deshmukh of Congress was chosen as Chief Minister, with Chagan Bhujbal representing the NCP as the Deputy Chief Minister along with Home Affairs and Jayant Patil as the Finance Minister.

== In government ==
Jayant Patil became the youngest finance minister of Maharashtra, presenting his first budget at the age of 39. He went on to present the Maharashtra budget ten times consecutively. In 2001, Jayant Patil met with a severe accident near Bangalore and had to undergo multiple operations on his fractured legs and used a wheelchair for several months. He presented the finance budget of 2001 while still recovering.

In the aftermath of the November 2008 Mumbai attacks, Patil held the Home portfolio for a brief while in the First Ashok Chavan ministry.

In 2009, Jayant Patil was sworn in as the Rural Development Minister in the Second Ashok Chavan ministry and continued with the same in the Prithviraj Chavan ministry. In his tenure he implemented e-panchayats. The scheme improved the tax collection and plantation of over 1 crore trees was also planned.

== Present political career ==
He retained his seat in the 2014 Maharashtra Legislative Assembly election, when NCP was reduced to just 41 seats. In 2018 he was unanimously elected as the State President of NCP replacing Sunil Tatkare. In August 2019, he launched and spearheaded the Shiv Swarajya Yatra from Shivneri, the birthplace of Chharapati Shivaji, at Junnar, Pune.

In the 2019 Maharashtra Legislative Assembly election, BJP won 105 seats, SHS won 56, NCP won 54 seats and INC won 42 seats. The President's rule was later revoked and the Bharatiya Janata Party, led by former Chief Minister Devendra Fadnavis, formed a government with the help of a small fraction of the Nationalist Congress Party, led by Ajit Pawar. After three days, Fadnavis and Ajit Pawar resigned. A new government was formed by the Maha Vikas Aghadi, a new alliance of Shiv Sena, the Indian National Congress, and the Nationalist Congress Party with Uddhav Thackeray as the Chief Minister. Jayant Patil was one of the first 6 to be sworn-in in the MVA Government. He became a Cabinet Minister for the 4th time with the portfolio of Water Resources & Command Area Development.

Additionally, he was elected as the leader of the NCP Legislative Party in the Vidhan Sabha in place of Ajit Pawar on 24 November 2019. He is also the Guardian Minister of Sangli.

In June 2020, in celebration of 21 years of NCP, Jayant Patil under the guidance of Sharad Pawar, launched the Rashtravadi Paksh Abhipray, an internal party digital feedback campaign.

In April 2018, appointed State president of Nationalist Congress Party (Sharadchandra Pawar) and re-appointed National president of Nationalist Congress Party (Sharadchandra Pawar) (2024–present).

In the 2024 Maharashtra Legislative Assembly election, BJP won 132 seats and NCP(SP) won just 10 seats.

== Personal life ==
Jayant Patil is married to Shailaja Patil. They have two sons, Prateek Patil and Rajvardhan Patil. He lives in Mumbai and Uran Islampur.
