= Shirgaon, Sangli =

Village in Maharashtra

Shirgaon, Sangli Shirgaon
- village
- Location in Maharashtra, India Shirgaon, Sangli (India)
- Coordinates: 17.028°N 74.386°E
- Country: India
- State: Maharashtra
- District(s): Sangli
- Subdivision: Walwa
- Nearest city: Uran Islampur
- Parliamentary constituency: Ichalkaranji
- Assembly constituency: Walwa

Population (2011)
  - Total: 1,950

Languages
  - Official: Marathi
- Time zone: UTC+5:30 (IST)

Shirgaon ("Shirgaav" in the Marathi language) is a small village in the Walwa subdivision of the Sangli District, Maharashtra state, India.

It is located 32 km west of Sangli and 320 km from Mumbai.

Agriculture is one of the main sources of income, with the main cultivated crop being sugar cane, followed by peanuts and soya beans. Most of the land is irrigated.

== Population ==
As of the 2011 Indian census, Shirgaon has a population of 1,950 inhabitants. Males make up 52% of the population and females 48%.

The traditional business of the Ambis is to drive small boats ("hodi", or "naav" in Marathi) on the river.

== The town ==
The village is surrounded by the Krishna River on three sides. During floods, the only way into the village is from the north.

The village has very few schools in the area with the primary/secondary schools K. Laxmibai Naikwadi Vidhyalay and the Shirgaon Z.P. School.

There is an ancient temple of Shiva on the banks of the river. Every year there are Mahashivratri celebrations in the temple, attended by a large number of devotees.

== Pragati Wachanalaya Shirgaon Library ==
The public library in Shirgaon is the Pragati Wachanalaya Shirgaon Library, started in 2002 by the Pragati Group Shirgaon. The library contains about 6000 books useful for children in their preparation of competitive examinations. This library celebrated its 13th anniversary on 14 November 2015 . Competitions held at this occasion for the students included a Rangoli competition, drawing, painting, handwriting and essay writing. The library has recently been given a computer to store the book inventory. In addition to children's study books, it holds Marathi daily newspapers such as Sakal, Pudhari, Lokmat and Loksatta, and monthly magazines.

Website - www.pragatilibrary.page4.me
