= Shivaji University =

State University in Kolhapur, Maharashtra

Coordinates: 16°40′41″N 74°15′19″E

- Motto: (ज्ञानमेवामृतम्)
- Motto in English: Knowledge is the elixir of life
- Type: Public
- Established: 18 November 1962 (63 years ago)
- Affiliations: UGC, NAAC, AIU
- Chancellor: Governor of Maharashtra
- Vice-Chancellor: Dr. Rajanish Kamat
- Students: 300,000 (2020)
- Location: Kolhapur, Maharashtra, India, India
- Campus: Urban
- Website: www.unishivaji.ac.in

Shivaji University, established in 1962, is a state university located at Kolhapur, Maharashtra, India. The university, with a campus spread over 853 acres (345 ha), is named in honour of Chatrapati Shivaji. It was inaugurated on 18 November 1962 by Dr. Radhakrishnan, the then president of India. Yashwantrao Chavan and Balasaheb Desai took the lead in establishing this university.

== Affiliations ==
Shiv-Sandesh monthly bulletin is published online by Shivaji University, which throws light on various activities and programmes organised in the university. Madhyamvidya and Media Spectrum are private distribution newspapers published by M.A. Mass Communication Department students.

The Arts College in Savlaj, which was at the time temporarily affiliated to Shivaji University, was founded in June 1991 to fulfill the needs of rural students, and its growth was largely due to Maharashtra politician R. R. Patil. In 2003, its affiliation to Shivaji University became permanent. In February 2009, the Arts College was renamed Shri Raosaheb Ramrao Patil Mahavidyalaya. The Shri Raosaheb Ramrao Patil Mahavidyalaya was last accredited by the National Assessment and Accreditation Council of India in 2012, which gave the school a B grade.

== Barrister Balasaheb Khardekar Library ==
The Barr. B. Khardekar Library at Shivaji University is one of the leading university libraries in southern Maharashtra. It caters to the academic needs of students, faculty and other users from the university as well as visitors from other universities and institutes. The library has over 310,000 printed documents, and it subscribes to over 298 national and international journals. The library is a member of the UGC/INFONET Digital Library consortium of INFLIBNET Centre, under which it has access to over 6000+ electronic journals and a few electronic databases. It has established contacts with universities, national and international organizations libraries for inter-library loans.

The library was named after the late Barr. Balasaheb Khardekar on 24 October 1981.

== Vice chancellors ==
Past and current vice chancellors

- A. G. Pawar (1962–1975)
- P. G. Patil (1975–1978)
- B. S. Bhanage (1978–1980)
- R. K. Kanbarkar (1980–1983)
- K. Bhogishayana (1983–1986)
- K. B. Powar (1986–1992)
- A. T. Varute (1992–1995)
- D. N. Dhanagare (1995–2000)
- M. G. Takwale (2000–2004)
- M. M. Salunkhe (2004–2009)
- N. J. Pawar (2010–2015)
- D. B. Shinde (2015–2020)
- D. T. Shirke (2020–2026)
- Dr. R. Kamat (2026–present)
