= Savlaj =

- Village
- Location in Maharashtra, India
- Coordinates: 17.10°N 74.78°E
- Country: India
- State: Maharashtra
- District: Sangli
- Elevation: 689 m (2,260 ft)

Population (2011)
  - Total: 10,600

Languages
  - Official: Marathi
- Time zone: UTC+5:30 (IST)
- PIN: 416311

Savlaj (also Savalaj) is a village in Tasgaon tehsil in Sangli district in the Indian state of Maharashtra. It is named after the village god Lord Savalsiddh or Savalsiddha.

Savlaj has a grampanchayat with 17 members and is a major village within Sangli zilla parishad and constituency.

== Geography ==
Savlaj is located 18 km from Tasgoan and 48 km from Sangli. It has an average elevation of 689 metres (2263 feet).

The village is near the River Aagrani.

== Economy ==
It is one of the growing villages of the tehsil. It is a big market for things such as clothes, agricultural materials, fruit and vegetables, and gold and silver for 12 nearby villages. Every Saturday is bazaar day. Along with Tasgaon tehsil, this village is famous for its grapes, which are exported mainly to Asian countries such as UAE, Singapore, Hong Kong, Sri Lanka, Bangladesh.

== People ==
The late R. R. Patil, former Home Minister of Maharashtra, studied at Savlaj and his political career started there, when he was elected Sangli zillah parishad member representing Savlaj.

== Religion ==
There are many religious sites: Siddheshwar Temple (also known as the Savalsiddh Temple), Mahadev Mandir, Jotiba Mandir, Kandoba Mandir, Mayyakka Mandir, Ramling Mandir, Datt Mandir and Choudeshwari Devi Mandir, also a mosque and a church.

== Schools ==
Savlaj has Mahatma Gandhi Vidyalay, Junior College of Arts, Science and MCVC, S K Unune English School, Zillah Parishad Primary Schools and R. R. Patil Senior College.
