= Gopalrao Bajirao Khedkar =

Indian politician

Abasaheb Khedkar

1st Minister of Rural Development (Maharashtra)
- In office 1 May 1960 – 19 November 1962
- Preceded by: position established
- Succeeded by: S. K. Wankhede

1st President of Maharashtra Pradesh Congress Committee
- Preceded by: position established
- Succeeded by: Vinayakrao Patil

Member of Parliament, Lok Sabha
- In office (1951-1957), (1957 – 1960)
- Preceded by: position established
- Succeeded by: T. S. Patil
- Constituency: Akola Lok Sabha constituency Buldhana Lok Sabha constituency

Member of Maharashtra Legislative Assembly
- In office (1962-1967), (1967 – 1972)
- Preceded by: position established
- Succeeded by: Manohar Bhikaji Tayade
- Constituency: Akot

Personal details
- Born: 14 January 1901 Khed Tal. Morshi, Amravati district, Maharashtra, India
- Died: 25 May 1969 (aged 68) Amravati, India
- Party: Indian National Congress
- Profession: Politician

Gopalrao Bajirao Deshmukh (14 January 1901 – 25 May 1969), also known as Abasaheb Khedkar, was a social activist and a farmers' leader in India. He was the Minister of Rural Development in the first cabinet ministry of Maharashtra and the first President of Maharashtra Pradesh Congress Committee.

== Biography ==
He was born at Khed in Amravati district of Vidarbha, Maharashtra on 14 January 1901. In 1917, after his matriculation, Abasaheb studied Homeopathy in Kolkata. In 1920, when he was studying at Amravati Victoria Technical School he came across Mahatma Gandhi non co-operation movement. He established Shivaji Boarding in 1923 which later became Shivaji Education Society.

== Political career ==
Abasaheb Khedkar was a protagonist of Samyukta Maharashtra and opposed to formation of separate Vidarbha. He wanted all Marathi speaking areas of India to be united under one state of Maharashtra, in the larger interest of Marathi people. He was one of the signatories of the informal agreement reached in 1953 by Marathi speaking politicians from different regions of Marathi speaking areas on the composition, and organization of the future Maharashtra state. The agreement is popularly known as the Nagpur Pact. He was the first president of Maharashtra Pradesh Congress Committee. He refused to take the position of Chief Minister of Maharashtra and preferred to take up the Rural Development portfolio. He was instrumental in implementing Panchayat raj in Maharashtra in the form of Zilla parishads (Equivalent to County or District Councils) in 1962.

== Akola Loksabha ==
Khedkar was elected as Member of Parliament From Akola Lok Sabha constituency twice and served in the Lok sabha from 1951 to 1960. He resigned from the Lok sabha in 1960 to enter into government of the newly formed state of Maharashtra.

== Akot Vidhansabha ==
Khedkar was elected from Akot constituency in 1962 to the first legislative assembly of the newly formed state of Maharashtra. He was re-elected from the same constituency in the 1967 elections.

== Death and legacy ==
- Dr. Abasaheb Khedkar died in 1969 at Amravati.
- Shri Shivaji Arts and Commerce Mahavidyalaya at Telhara district Akola was renamed in his memory to Dr Gopalrao Khedkar Mahavidyalaya Gadegaon (Telhara).
- A Special cover of the Indian Postal Stamp was issued by the then President Of India, Mrs Pratibha Patil in 2013 at Amravati. Early in Mrs. Patil's career, Abasaheb had been her political mentor. His son was Late Vasantrao Gopalrao Khedkar Retd. IAS and daughter Late Nalini Vasant Deshmukh.
