= Tasgaon-Kavathe Mahankal Assembly constituency =

Constituency of the Maharashtra legislative assembly in India

Coordinates: 17°01′56.18″N 74°35′14.19″E

Tasgaon Kavathe Mahankal
- Constituency No. 287 for the Maharashtra Legislative Assembly

Constituency details
- Country: India
- Region: Western India
- State: Maharashtra
- District: Sangli
- Lok Sabha constituency: Sangli
- Established: 2008
- Total electors: 314,856
- Reservation: None

Member of Legislative Assembly
- 15th Maharashtra Legislative Assembly
- Incumbent Rohit Patil
- Party: NCP-SP
- Alliance: MVA
- Elected year: 2024

Tasgaon-Kavathe Mahankal Assembly constituency is one of the 288 Vidhan Sabha (legislative assembly) constituencies of Maharashtra state in western India. Tasgaon-Kavathe Mahankal constituency is one of the eight Vidhan Sabha constituencies located in Sangli district. It comprises part of Tasgaon tehsil and the entire Kavathe Mahankal tehsil of the district.

It is also a part of Sangli Lok Sabha constituency along with five other Vidhan Sabha constituencies in this district, namely Miraj, Sangli, Palus-Kadegaon, Khanapur and Jat.

== Members of Legislative Assembly ==
Year	Member	Party
Till 2009 : See Tasgaon & Kavathe Mahankal
2009	R. R. Patil	Nationalist Congress Party
2014	R. R. Patil	Nationalist Congress Party
2015^	Suman Patil	Nationalist Congress Party
2019	Suman Patil	Nationalist Congress Party
2024	Rohit Patil	Nationalist Congress Party (SP)

== Election results ==
=== Assembly Election 2024 ===
2024 Maharashtra Legislative Assembly election : Tasgaon-Kavathe Mahankal
Party	Candidate	Votes	%	±%
NCP-SP	Rohit Patil	128,403	54.21	New
NCP	Sanjaykaka Patil	100,759	42.54	New
NOTA	None of the Above	528	0.22	▼0.65
Margin of victory		27,644	11.67	▼19.67
Turnout		237,382	75.39	▲7.15
Total valid votes		236,854		
Registered electors		314,856		▲6.70
NCP-SP gain from NCP		Swing	▼10.13	

=== Assembly Election 2019 ===
2019 Maharashtra Legislative Assembly election : Tasgaon-Kavathe Mahankal
Party	Candidate	Votes	%	±%
NCP	Suman Patil	128,371	64.34	▼21.19
SS	Ajitrao Shankarrao Ghorpade	65,839	33.00	New
BSP	Shankar (Dada) Mane	2,320	1.16	New
NOTA	None of the Above	1,744	0.87	▼0.10
Margin of victory		62,532	31.34	▼42.27
Turnout		201,386	68.25	▲11.27
Total valid votes		199,528		
Registered electors		295,083		▲9.57
NCP hold		Swing	▼21.19	

=== Assembly By-election 2015 ===
2015 Maharashtra Legislative Assembly by-election : Tasgaon-Kavathe Mahankal
Party	Candidate	Votes	%	±%
NCP	Suman Patil	131,236	85.52	▲32.53
Independent	Adv. Swapnil Diliprao Patil	18,273	11.91	New
NOTA	None of the Above	1,495	0.97	▲0.41
Independent	Prashant Dnyaneshwar Gangavane	1,062	0.69	New
Margin of victory		112,963	73.61	▲62.65
Turnout		154,938	57.53	▼18.36
Total valid votes		153,452		
Registered electors		269,304		▼0.73
NCP hold		Swing	▲32.53	

=== Assembly Election 2014 ===
2014 Maharashtra Legislative Assembly election : Tasgaon-Kavathe Mahankal
Party	Candidate	Votes	%	±%
NCP	Raosaheb Ramrao Patil	108,310	52.99	▼9.52
BJP	Ajitrao Shankarrao Ghorpade	85,900	42.03	New
INC	Suresh Shendage	3,473	1.70	New
SS	Mahesh (Bhau) Yashawant Kharade	1,967	0.96	▼20.44
BSP	Shankar Martand Mane	1,272	0.62	▼0.86
NOTA	None of the Above	1,153	0.56	New
Margin of victory		22,410	10.96	▼30.14
Turnout		205,730	75.84	▲11.90
Total valid votes		204,380		
Registered electors		271,273		▲8.55
NCP hold		Swing	▼9.52	

=== Assembly Election 2009 ===
2009 Maharashtra Legislative Assembly election : Tasgaon-Kavathe Mahankal
Party	Candidate	Votes	%	±%
NCP	Raosaheb Ramrao Patil	99,109	62.51	New
SS	Dinkar Balasaheb Patil	33,936	21.40	New
Independent	Colonel Bhagatsing Deshmukh (Rtd)	9,736	6.14	New
Independent	Swapnil Dilip Patil	5,310	3.35	New
Independent	Sachin Shirishkumar Patil	3,615	2.28	New
BSP	Ulhas Namdev Bhandare	2,351	1.48	New
Independent	Patil Rajendra Uttamrao	1,251	0.79	New
Margin of victory		65,173	41.11	
Turnout		158,608	63.47	
Total valid votes		158,544		
Registered electors		249,906		
NCP win (new seat)				

== See also ==
- Tasgaon
- Kavathe-Mahankal
- List of constituencies of Maharashtra Vidhan Sabha
