= Annabhau Sathe =

Indian Social Reformer, Author, Poet, and Activist

Tukaram Bhaurao Sathe
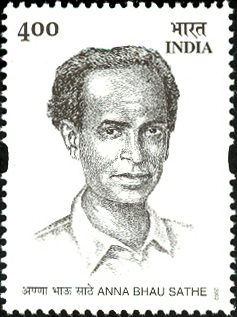
- Sathe on a 2002 stamp of India
- Born: Tukaram Bhaurao Sathe; 1 August 1920; Wategaon, Bombay Presidency, British India
- Died: 18 July 1969 (aged 48); Bombay, Maharashtra, India
- Other names: Sahitya-Samrat, Lokshahir, Annabhau, Sahityaratn, Jahadvikhyat, Sanyukt Maharashtra Janak, Samyukta Maharashtra Shilpkar, Shildear, Agrni, Dinjanancha Sfurtidata
- Occupation: Social Reformer
- Known for: Novel Writer, Poet, Film Screenwriter
- Notable work: Samyukta Maharashtra Movement
- Political party: Communist Party of India

Tukaram Bhaurao Sathe (1 August 1920 – 18 July 1969), popularly known as Anna Bhau Sathe (Marathi pronunciation: [əɳːaːbʱaːu saːʈʰe]), was a social reformer, folk poet, and writer from Maharashtra, India. Sathe was a Dalit born into the untouchable community, and his upbringing and identity were central to his writing and political activism. Sathe was a Marxist-Ambedkarite, initially influenced by the communists but he later became an Ambedkarite. He is credited as a founding father of Dalit literature and played a vital role in the Samyukta Maharashtra Movement.

== Early life ==
He was born on 1 August 1920, in Wategaon village, part of present-day Maharashtra's Sangli district, to a family that belonged to the untouchable Matang caste. Members of the caste used to play traditional folk instruments in Tamasha performances.

Annabhau Sathe did not study beyond class four. He migrated from Satara to Bombay, present-day Mumbai, in 1931, on foot, over a period of six months, following a drought in the countryside. In Bombay, Sathe undertook a range of odd jobs.

== Writings ==
Sathe wrote 35 novels in the Marathi language. They include Fakira (1959), which is in its 19th edition and received a state government award in 1961. It is a novel which tells the story of the protagonist; a stout young guy, named Fakira, his feat, his crusading for the rights of people of his community in the British Raj and his enmity towards the evil forces in the village. However, the cause from where the story progresses is the religious practice or ritual called 'Jogin' which gives a way to further actions. There are 15 collections of Sathe's short stories, of which a large number have been translated into many Indian and as many as 27 non-Indian languages. Besides novels and short stories, Sathe wrote a play, a travelogue on Russia, 12 screenplays, and 10 ballads in the Marathi powada style.

Sathe's use of folkloric narrative styles like powada and lavani helped popularise and make his work accessible to many communities. In Fakira, Sathe portrays Fakira, the protagonist, revolting against the rural orthodox system and British Raj to save his community from utter starvation. The protagonist and his community are subsequently arrested and tortured by British officers, and Fakira is eventually killed by hanging.

The urban environment of Bombay significantly influenced his writings, which depict it as a dystopian milieu. Aarti Wani describes two of his songs – "Mumbai Chi Lavani" (Song of Bombay) and "Mumbai cha Girni Kamgar" (Bombay's Mill-hand) – as depicting a city that is "rapacious, exploitative, unequal and unjust".

== Politics ==
Sathe was initially influenced by communist ideology. Together with writers such as D. N. Gavankar and Amar Shaikh, he was a member of Lal Bawta Kalapathak (Red Flag Cultural Squad), the cultural wing of the Communist Party of India, and a Tamasha theatrical troupe that challenged government thinking. It had been active in the 1940s and, according to Tevia Abrams, was "the most exciting theatrical phenomenon of the 1950s" before communism in India generally fragmented in the aftermath of independence. He was a significant figure also in the Indian People's Theatre Association, which was a cultural wing of the Communist Party of India, and in the Samyukta Maharashtra Movement, which sought the creation of a separate Marathi-speaking state through a linguistic division of the extant Bombay State.

Sathe shifted toward Dalit activism, following the teachings of B. R. Ambedkar, and used his stories to amplify the life experiences of Dalits and workers. In his inaugural speech at the first Dalit Sahitya Sammelan, a literary conference that he founded in Bombay in 1958, he said that, "the earth is not balanced on the snake's head but on the strength of Dalit and working-class people," emphasising the importance of Dalit and working-class people in global structures. Unlike most Dalit writers of the period, Sathe's work was influenced by Marxism rather than Buddhism.

He said that "Dalit writers are entailed with the responsibility of liberating and shielding Dalits from the existing worldly and Hindu tortures as the long standing conventional beliefs cannot be destroyed instantly."

== Legacy ==
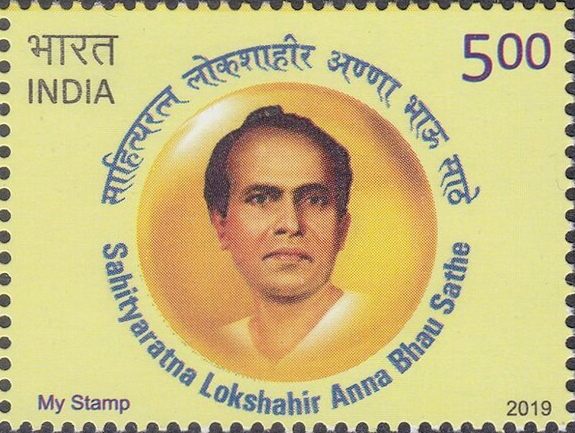
Anna Bhau Sathe 2019 stamp of India

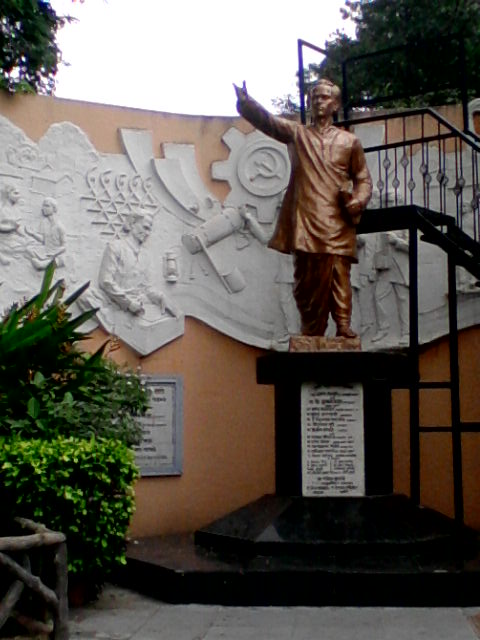
Annabhau Sathe statue in Maharashtra

Sathe has become an icon to Dalits, and especially the Mang caste. The Lokshahir Annabhau Sathe Development Corporation was established in 1985 to further the cause of the Mang people, and women in local branches of the Manavi Hakk Abhiyan (Human Rights Campaign, a Mang-Ambedkarite body) organise jayanti (processions) in his name and those of Babasaheb Ambedkar and Savitribai Phule. Political parties, such as the Indian National Congress and the Bharatiya Janata Party-Shiv Sena alliance, have attempted to appropriate his image as a means of drawing electoral support from the Mangs.

Sathe was commemorated with the issue of a special ₹4 postage stamp by India Post on 1 August 2002. Buildings have also been named after him, including the Lokshahir Annabhau Sathe Smarak in Pune and a flyover in Kurla.

In 2022 a statue of Sathe was installed at the Margarita Rudomino All-Russia State Library for International Literature in Moscow.
