= Kavathe Mahankal Assembly constituency =

Former constituency of the Maharashtra legislative assembly in India

Coordinates: 19.020°N 72.843°E

Kavathe Mahankal
- Former constituency for the Maharashtra Legislative Assembly

Constituency details
- Country: India
- Region: Western India
- State: Maharashtra
- Lok Sabha constituency: Sangli
- Established: 1978
- Abolished: 2008

Kavathe Mahankal Vidhan Sabha seat was one of the constituencies of Maharashtra Vidhan Sabha, in India. It was a segment of Sangli Lok Sabha constituency. Kavathe Mahankal seat existed until the 2004 elections after which it was succeeded by Tasgaon-Kavathe Mahankal Assembly constituency seat in 2008.

== Members of Legislative Assembly ==
Year	Member	Party
1967 - 1972 Atpadi Kawathe Mahankal
1967	B. S. Kore	Indian National Congress
1972	Annasaheb Udhav lengare	Indian National Congress
1978 onwards Kawathe Mahankal
1978	Vitthal Shripati Patil	Indian National Congress
1980	Vitthal Shripati Patil	Indian National Congress
1985	Vitthal Shripati Patil	Indian National Congress
1990	Shivajirao Krishnaji Shendge	Indian National Congress
1995	Ajitrao Shankarrao Ghorpade	Independent politician
1999	Ajitrao Shankarrao Ghorpade	Independent politician
2004	Ajitrao Shankarrao Ghorpade	Indian National Congress
2009 onwards : See Tasgaon-Kavathe Mahankal

== Election results ==
=== Assembly Election 2004 ===
2004 Maharashtra Legislative Assembly election : Kavathe Mahankal
Party	Candidate	Votes	%	±%
INC	Ajitrao Shankarrao Ghorpade	72,597	50.57%	▲36.76
Independent	Jaysingrao(Tatya) Dhondiram Shendage	58,501	40.75%	New
SS	Appasaheb Bhupal Hulle	9,072	6.32%	▲4.71
BSP	Bhandare Prakash Tukaram	1,450	1.01%	New
Independent	Uttamrao Pandurangrao Shinde (Sarkar)	927	0.65%	New
Margin of victory		14,096	9.82%	▲0.87
Turnout		143,556	73.21%	▼2.80
Registered electors		195,845		▲18.29
INC gain from Independent		Swing	▲10.83	

=== Assembly Election 1999 ===
1999 Maharashtra Legislative Assembly election : Kavathe Mahankal
Party	Candidate	Votes	%	±%
Independent	Ajitrao Shankarrao Ghorpade	50,075	39.74%	New
NCP	Shivajirao Krishnaji Shendge	38,797	30.79%	New
INC	Ramdas Vitthal Patil	17,401	13.81%	▼29.82
Independent	Appasaheb Bhupal Hulle	9,479	7.52%	New
SS	Dinkar Balasaheb Patil	2,026	1.61%	▲1.25
Independent	Shamrao Piraji Kadam	938	0.74%	New
Margin of victory		11,278	8.95%	▲0.41
Turnout		126,001	71.70%	▼10.55
Registered electors		165,568		▲3.07
Independent hold		Swing	▼12.43	

=== Assembly Election 1995 ===
1995 Maharashtra Legislative Assembly election : Kavathe Mahankal
Party	Candidate	Votes	%	±%
Independent	Ajitrao Shankarrao Ghorpade	72,619	52.17%	New
INC	Shivajirao Krishnaji Shendge	60,729	43.63%	▼1.59
JD	Kisanrao Dadu Shinde	2,159	1.55%	▼7.75
Margin of victory		11,890	8.54%	▲5.32
Turnout		139,202	85.35%	▲13.49
Registered electors		160,640		▲8.53
Independent gain from INC		Swing	▲6.95	

=== Assembly Election 1990 ===
1990 Maharashtra Legislative Assembly election : Kavathe Mahankal
Party	Candidate	Votes	%	±%
INC	Shivajirao Krishnaji Shendge	48,962	45.21%	▼2.50
Independent	Ajitrao Shankarrao Ghorpade	45,474	41.99%	New
JD	Balasaheb Vishwasrao Patil	10,076	9.30%	New
SS	Govindrao N. Salunke	1,179	1.09%	New
Margin of victory		3,488	3.22%	▼5.54
Turnout		108,290	72.05%	▲6.15
Registered electors		148,015		▲22.94
INC hold		Swing	▼2.50	

=== Assembly Election 1985 ===
1985 Maharashtra Legislative Assembly election : Kavathe Mahankal
Party	Candidate	Votes	%	±%
INC	Vitthal Shripati Patil	38,497	47.71%	New
JP	Ajitrao Shankarrao Ghorpade	31,427	38.95%	New
Independent	Ravindra Gundaji Patil	8,411	10.42%	New
Margin of victory		7,070	8.76%	▼46.78
Turnout		80,684	65.63%	▲16.59
Registered electors		120,400		▲7.11
INC gain from INC(I)		Swing	▼22.91	

=== Assembly Election 1980 ===
1980 Maharashtra Legislative Assembly election : Kavathe Mahankal
Party	Candidate	Votes	%	±%
INC(I)	Vitthal Shripati Patil	40,030	70.63%	New
Independent	Pandit Narayan Jadhav	8,550	15.08%	New
INC(U)	Vilas Jaysingrao Bhosale	5,701	10.06%	New
Independent	Shidu Kashinath Patil	965	1.70%	New
Margin of victory		31,480	55.54%	▲28.61
Turnout		56,679	49.15%	▼22.15
Registered electors		112,411		▲8.90
INC(I) gain from INC		Swing	▲10.19	

=== Assembly Election 1978 ===
1978 Maharashtra Legislative Assembly election : Kavathe Mahankal
Party	Candidate	Votes	%	±%
INC	Vitthal Shripati Patil	45,278	60.44%	New
JP	Appasaheb Gannapati Sagare	25,103	33.51%	New
PWPI	Anandrao Bapusaheb Shinde	2,586	3.45%	New
Margin of victory		20,175	26.93%	
Turnout		74,915	70.69%	
Registered electors		103,227		
INC win (new seat)				

=== Assembly Election 1972 ===
1972 Maharashtra Legislative Assembly election : Atpadi Kawathe Mahankal
Party	Candidate	Votes	%	±%
INC	Annasaheb Udhav Engare	51,891	87.75%	▲25.38
SSP	Haribhau Nana Khujat	5,704	9.65%	New
Margin of victory		46,187	78.11%	▲26.71
Turnout		59,133	54.98%	▼5.19
Registered electors		104,759		▲20.57
INC hold		Swing	▲25.38	

=== Assembly Election 1967 ===
1967 Maharashtra Legislative Assembly election : Atpadi Kawathe Mahankal
Party	Candidate	Votes	%	±%
INC	B. S. Kore	33,404	62.37%	New
Independent	R. R. Deshmukh	5,875	10.97%	New
SSP	S. G. Patil	5,471	10.22%	New
Independent	T. K. Shendge	3,831	7.15%	New
ABJS	V. D. Patil	1,873	3.50%	New
Margin of victory		27,529	51.40%	
Turnout		53,558	58.07%	
Registered electors		86,889		
INC win (new seat)				

== See also ==
- List of constituencies of Maharashtra Legislative Assembly
