= Shirgav =

Village in Maharashtra

Shirgav ( English: Shirgaon) at Walwa in Sangli district, in Maharashtra, India, is a tiny village situated on the banks of river Krishna.

The village comes under Walwa Tahsil. There is primary school in village founded in 1913.
