= Dhankawadi =

Dhankawadi धनकवडी
- borough
- Location within Maharashtra
- Coordinates: 18°28′20″N 73°51′14″E
- Country: India
- State: Maharashtra
- Division: Pune Division
- District: Pune district
- Taluka: Pune City
- Elevation: 560 m (1,840 ft)
- Time zone: UTC+5:30 (IST)
- ZIP code(s): 411 043
- Area code: +91-20
- Official language: Marathi

Dhankawadi was an outlying borough of the city of Pune in the state of Maharashtra. It lies on the southern edge of the city along old Route 4 just north of where the Route 4 bypass leaves old Route 4, about 6.5 kilometres (4.0 mi) south of the Pune city Centre. Dhankawadi has become a pilgrimage centre due to the influence of Sant Sadguru Shri Shankar Maharaj.

Dhankawadi was a small village that was subsumed into Pune in 1995 and now counted into pune city. The area has been ongoing rapid building development since 2000. Part of Dhankawadi has been reserved for a bio-diversity park; however, the park remains in the proposal stage.

Dhankawadi is also a home to many of the top colleges in Pune, including Pune Institute of Computer Technology (PICT), Bharti Vidyapeeth Deemed University(BVPDU).

It also includes many local attractions like Katraj Lake which has an island with a large statue of warrior king Shivaji and a huge Rajiv Gandhi Zoological Park with a snake park and animal rescue center.
