= Yedemachindra =

Village in Maharashtra

Coordinates: 17.149915°N 74.284753°E

Yedemachindra is a village in Walwa taluka in Sangli district of Maharashtra

This village is the birth village of Kranti Singh Nana Patil and there is a memorial in the village. The village has a statue of Kranti Singh and has a high school named after him.
