= Itkare =

Village in Maharashtra

- village
- Interactive map of Itkare
- Coordinates: 16.9618735°N 74.2588663°E
- Country: India
- State: Maharashtra
- District: Sangli

Population
  - Total: 7,000

Languages
  - Official: Marathi
- Time zone: UTC+5:30 (IST)
- PIN: 415403
- Vehicle registration: MH-10
- Coastline: 0 kilometres (0 mi)
- Nearest city: Islampur, Sangli
- Lok Sabha constituency: Hatkanagale

Itkare is a village located in the Sangli district in the state of Maharashtra, India. The village is located at about 400 km from the state capital, Mumbai and 200 km from Pune. The village has undergone transformation under the panchayat. There has been use of advanced technology in education. Efforts have been made for empowerment of women and increasing the security in the village. The village has around 90% erigated land.

== People ==
The main business of the villagers of Itkare is farming, mainly producing sugarcane. In addition to sugarcane, rice and wheat are also being produced by the farmers.
