= Shirate =

Village in Maharashtra

Shirate शिरटे
- village
- Interactive map of Shirate
- Coordinates: 17°07′37″N 74°17′13″E
- Country: India
- State: Maharashtra
- District: Sangli
- Named for: Goddess Sita

Government
  - Type: Panchyati Raj
  - Body: Grampanchayat Shirate

Languages
  - Official: Marathi
- Time zone: UTC+5:30 (IST)
- PIN: 415409
- Nearest city: Islampur, Sangli

Shirate is a village located in Walwa Taluka of the Sangli district of Maharashtra, India. Shirate Grampanchayat was established on 20th June 1956.Grampanchayat has been awarded with various awards like Nirmalgram Grampanchayat, Mahatma Gandhi Tantamukti Grampanchayat, Bimagram Grampanchayat. There are 614 families residing in the village, with a population of population of 2943, according to the 2011 Census.
