= Yedenipani =

Village in Maharashtra

- Location in Maharashtra, India Yedenipani (India)
- Coordinates: 16.9726°N 74.2866°E
- Country: India
- State: Maharashtra
- District: Sangli
- Subdistrict: Valva-islampur

Government
  - Municipal Commissioner: mansing Naik
- Time zone: UTC+5:30 (IST)
- Pincode: 416 4xx

Yedenipani is a village in the Indian state of Maharashtra.It is located at 35 km away from Kolhapur. Mallikarjun Temple is a historical temple in west Maharashtra. The temple is of "Lord Shiva". This temple situated on the mountain with much greenery. The temple build in black rocks with many pillars with one main gate, and other small caves around it. There are many steps and a gravel road to reach to temple from the bottom of temple.

The village is also known for its bravery nature, as Mr. Pandurang master had actively participated in the 'Prati sarkar' part of chodo bharat andolan. It was says that during that days meetings of Prati sarkar were held at Mallikarjun fort.
