= R. R. Patil =

Indian politician (1956–2015)

Aaba R. R. Patil
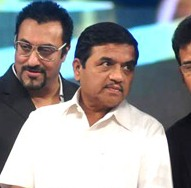

7th Deputy Chief Minister of Maharashtra
- In office 1 November 2004 – 4 December 2008
- Minister: Home Affairs
- Governor: Mohammed Fazal; S. M. Krishna; S. C. Jamir
- Cabinet: Second Deshmukh ministry
- Chief Minister: Vilasrao Deshmukh
- Guardian Minister: Gadchiroli District; Sangli District
- Preceded by: Vijaysingh Mohite-Patil (Deputy Chief Minister); Himself (Home Affairs Ministry)
- Succeeded by: Chhagan Bhujbal (Deputy Chief Minister); Jayant Patil (Home Affairs Ministry)

Cabinet Minister Government of Maharashtra
- In office 11 November 2010 – 26 September 2014
- Minister: Home Affairs; Ex. Servicemen Welfare
- Governor: Kateekal Sankaranarayanan; Om Prakash Kohli (additional charge); C. Vidyasagar Rao
- Cabinet: Prithviraj Chavan ministry
- Chief Minister: Prithviraj Chavan
- Deputy CM: Ajit Pawar
- Guardian Minister: Beed District; Gadchiroli District; Mumbai City District
- Preceded by: Himself (Home Affairs Ministry); Mohammed Arif Naseem Khan (Ex. Servicemen Welfare Ministry)
- Succeeded by: Devendra Fadnavis CM (Home Affairs Ministry); Sambhaji Patil Nilangekar (Ex. Servicemen Welfare Ministry)

Leader of The House Maharashtra Legislative Council
- In office 29 September 2012 – 26 September 2014
- Chief Minister: Prithviraj Chavan
- Chairman of the House: Shivajirao Deshmukh
- Deputy Leader: Suresh Shetty
- Preceded by: Ajit Pawar
- Succeeded by: Eknath Khadse
- In office 1 November 2004 – 4 December 2008
- Chief Minister: Vilasrao Deshmukh
- Chairman of the House: Shivajirao Deshmukh
- Deputy Leader: Anees Ahmed
- Preceded by: Vijaysingh Mohite-Patil
- Succeeded by: Patangrao Kadam

Deputy Leader of The House Maharashtra Legislative Assembly
- In office 1 November 2004 – 4 December 2008
- Chief Minister: Vilasrao Deshmukh
- Speaker of the House: Babasaheb Kupekar
- Leader of the House: Vilasrao Deshmukh
- Preceded by: Vijaysingh Mohite-Patil
- Succeeded by: Chhagan Bhujbal

Cabinet Minister Government of Maharashtra
- In office 7 November 2009 – 11 November 2010
- Minister: Home Affairs
- Governor: S. C. Jamir; K. Sankaranarayanan
- Cabinet: Second Ashok Chavan ministry
- Chief Minister: Ashok Chavan
- Deputy CM: Chhagan Bhujbal
- Guardian Minister: Gadchiroli District
- Preceded by: Himself
- Succeeded by: Himself

Cabinet Minister Government of Maharashtra
- In office 8 December 2008 – 6 November 2009
- Minister: Rural Development; Skill Development and Entrepreneurship; Majority Welfare Development
- Governor: S. C. Jamir
- First Ashok Chavan ministry
- Chief Minister: Ashok Chavan
- Deputy CM: Chhagan Bhujbal
- Guardian Minister: Gadchiroli District; Yavatmal District
- Preceded by: Vijaysinh Mohite-Patil (Rural Development Ministry); Patangrao Kadam (Skill Development and Entrepreneurship Ministry); Vilasrao Deshmukh CM (Majority Welfare Development Ministry)
- Succeeded by: Jayant Patil (Rural Development Ministry); Mohammed Arif Naseem Khan (Skill Development and Entrepreneurship Ministry); Patangrao Kadam (Majority Welfare Development Ministry)

Cabinet Minister Government of Maharashtra
- In office 27 January 2003 – 19 October 2004
- Minister: Home Affairs
- Governor: Mohammed Fazal
- Cabinet: Sushilkumar Shinde ministry
- Chief Minister: Sushilkumar Shinde
- Deputy CM: Chhagan Bhujbal; Vijaysinh Mohite–Patil
- Guardian Minister: Gadchiroli District
- Preceded by: Chhagan Bhujbal DCM
- Succeeded by: Himself DCM

Cabinet Minister Government of Maharashtra
- In office 18 October 1999 – 16 January 2003
- Minister: Rural Development; Water Supply; Sanitation
- Governor: P. C. Alexander; Mohammed Fazal
- Cabinet: First Deshmukh ministry
- Chief Minister: Vilasrao Deshmukh
- Deputy CM: Chhagan Bhujbal
- Guardian Minister: Sangli District; Gadchiroli District
- Preceded by: Sabir Shaikh (Rural Development Ministry); Radhakrishna Vikhe Patil (Water Supply Ministry); Radhakrishna Vikhe Patil (Sanitation Ministry)
- Succeeded by: Ranjeet Deshmukh (Rural Development Ministry); Ashok Chavan (Water Supply Ministry); Ashok Chavan (Sanitation Ministry)

Member of Maharashtra Legislative Assembly
- In office 27 February 1990 – 16 February 2015
- Governor: Chidambaram Subramaniam; P.C. Alexander; Mohammed Fazal; S.M. Krishna; S. C. Jamir; K. Sankaranarayanan; C. Vidyasagar Rao
- Speaker of the House: Madhukarrao Chaudhari; Dattaji Nalawade; Arun Gujarathi; Babasaheb Kupekar; Dilip Walse-Patil; Haribhau Bagade
- Preceded by: Kalyanrao Jayvantrao Patil
- Succeeded by: Suman Patil
- Parliamentary group: Indian National Congress (1990 - 1999); Nationalist Congress Party (1999 - 2015)
- Constituency: Tasgaon-Kavathe Mahankal

Personal details
- Born: 16 August 1956 Tasgaon, Bombay State, India
- Died: 16 February 2015 (aged 58) Mumbai, Maharashtra, India
- Citizenship: Indian
- Party: Nationalist Congress Party Indian National Congress
- Spouse: Suman Patil
- Children: 3 including Rohit Patil
- Education: B.A, L.L.B.
- Occupation: Politician

Raosaheb Ramrao Patil, better known as R. R. Patil (16 August 1956 – 16 February 2015), was an Indian politician from the state of Maharashtra. He was an MLA for Tasgaon vidhan sabha constituency from 1991 to 2015. He was an important leader of modern Maharashtra. He was a member of the Nationalist Congress Party. He became Home Minister of Maharashtra for the second time after the 2009 Maharashtra assembly election victory of the Congress-NCP alliance. He was also the former Deputy Chief Minister of Maharashtra.

== Early life ==
R. R. Patil, popularly known as "Aaba", (Marathi: आबा) was born on 16 August 1957 in the village of Anjani, in the Tasgaon taluka, Sangli district in the State of Maharashtra. Despite his father being the village head, their financial condition was not good. He completed most of his education under the government scheme of "Earn & Learn". He obtained a B.A. and an LL.B. from Shantiniketan college in Sangli.

== Career ==
Patil was a member of Sangli Zillah Parishad from 1979 to 1990 from Savlaj constituency, then was elected to the Maharashtra Legislative Assembly in 1990, 1995, 1999, 2004, 2009 and 2014 representing Tasgaon, in Sangli district. He became the Chief Whip of the Congress Party in the assembly as well as the chairman of the public accounts committee of the assembly in 1996–97 and 1998–99.

After 1999 Maharashtra Legislative Assembly election, he became the Rural Development Minister of Maharashtra in the Congress-NCP coalition government in October 1999. He became the Home Minister of Maharashtra on 25 December 2003. After taking charge of Home Ministry, he also sought guardianship of naxal activity affected district Gadchiroli. Since then, in spite of many naxal attacks, he encouraged natives to support elected government through some developmental work for them. On 1 November 2004, he was sworn in as the Deputy Chief Minister of Maharashtra. He was also the chief of the Nationalist Congress Party's Maharashtra unit and NCP legislative party in Maharashtra.

He was a politician in Maharashtra, also christened as 'Mr Clean' in political circles due to his clean image in the erstwhile tainted political party and also due to cleanliness awareness initiatives like "Gadage Baba Swachata Abhiyan" and "Tantamukt Gaon".

== Controversy ==
His comments in the aftermath of the November 2008 Mumbai attacks have drawn severe criticism for downplaying the gravity of the situation. He was quoted as saying, "They (the terrorists) came to kill 5,000 people but we ensured minimal damage". Sources close to him have argued that his comments are being taken out of context and that he did not intend to downplay the grievous attack.

He resigned on 1 December 2008 after further remarks on the attacks. When asked at a press conference whether the terror strike was an intelligence failure Patil said, "It is not like that. In big cities like this, incidents like this do happen. It's [sic] is not a total failure." Patil's words drew flak from many quarters. Mumbai residents who saw him say this on television or were told about it by reporters pointed out the irony of politicians making such statements after being provided high security.

== Death ==
Patil died at Lilavati Hospital and Research Centre after a long fight with oral cancer. Patil showed signs of improvement after his initial treatment and was taken off life support in January 2015, but he succumbed to the disease on 16 February 2015. The last rites were performed in Anjani village in Tasgaon area of Sangli district, Maharashtra on 17 February 2015. Patil's funeral was held with state honours, including a 21-gun salute by the Maharashtra government and was attended by the Maharashtra Chief Minister Devendra Fadnavis, Anna Hazare, Sharad Pawar and other political leaders from various parties.

Preceded by Vijaysingh Mohite-Patil	Deputy Chief Minister of Maharashtra; 1 November 2004 – 1 December 2008	Succeeded by Chhagan Bhujbal
Preceded by Chhagan Bhujbal	Home Minister; 25 December 2003 – 1 December 2008	Succeeded by Jayant Patil
Preceded by Jayant Patil	Home Minister; 9 October 2009 – 26 September 2014	Succeeded by Devendra Fadnavis
