= Nagnath Naikwadi =

Indian politician (1922–2012)

- Born: 15 July 1922; Walwa, Sangli district, Maharashtra, India
- Died: 22 March 2012 (aged 89); Mumbai, Maharashtra, India
- Occupations: Social worker Indian independence activist Educationist
- Years active: 1939–2012
- Known for: Prati Sarkar
- Spouse: Kusum
- Children: Three sons and two daughters
- Parent(s): Ramchandra Ganapati Nayakawadi; Laxmibai
- Awards: Padma Bhushan

Nagnath Naikwadi (1922–2012), popularly known as Krantiveer Nagnath anna, was an Indian independence activist, social worker, politician and educationist, known for his revolutionary activism during the Indian independence struggle. He was an associate of Nana Patil during the Quit India movement and together they established Prati Sarkar, a parallel government, in Satara-Sangli region of Maharashtra and indulged in armed struggle against the British. After the Indian independence, he was involved in electoral politics and was a member of the Maharashtra Legislative Assembly, representing Sangli. The Government of India awarded him the third highest civilian honour of the Padma Bhushan, in 2009, for his contributions to Indian society.

== Early life ==
Naikwadi was born on 15 July 1922 in a farmer's family in Walwa, a village in Sangli district near Pune in the western Indian state of Maharashtra to Ramchandra Ganapati Nayakawadi and Laxmibai, After early schooling at local schools in Walwa and Ashta, he joined Rajaram High School, Kolhapur and completed matriculate studies in 1948, though there was a break in studies due to his involvement in the Indian independence struggle. Later he joined Rajaram College for higher studies. During this period, he got involved in the Quit India movement and joined Rashtra Seva Dal, a forum of freedom activists which gave him an opportunity to become an associate of Nana Patil.

== Independence activist ==
During the early 1940s, Naikwadi and his colleagues resorted to armed conflict against the British colonial authorities. In order to raise funds for the movement, his group robbed a government treasury in Dhule and supported the insurgency against the Nizam of Hyderabad. During one of his skirmishes with the British police, he was caught after being injured by a bullet. While in custody at Satara jail, he staged a jailbreak with his fellow activists. The British colonial government announced a reward on his head but Naikwadi managed to stay underground for four years. In 1943, along with Nana Patil, Kisanrao Ahir and a few others, he declared a parallel government, Prati Sarkar, which operated in around 150 villages in the western Maharashtra region which included Satara and Sangli.

== Social work after Indian independence ==
After the Indian independence in 1947, Naikwadi shifted his focus to social work. He founded a number of educational institutions such as Kisan Shikshan Sanstha which runs a college of education and an upper primary school, Hutatma Kisan Ahir Vidyalaya, a junior college and Hutatma Nanaksing Hostel. In 1950, after his marriage to Kusum, he worked alongside Shetamajur Kashtkari Shetakari Sanghatana reformers and was involved in the Sanyukta Maharashtra movement. Entering electoral politics in 1957, he successfully contested the Assembly elections and served as a Member of Legislative Assembly till 1962. Once the tenure as an MLA was over, he returned to his social work and founded Jijamata Vidyalaya and Savitribai Phule Girls' Hostel. The next two decades of his life was associated with the cooperative movement and sugarcane farming, starting with the implementation of Kisan Lift Irrigation Scheme in 1972 and culminating in the establishment of Hutatma Kisan Ahir Sahakari Sakhar Karkhana in 1984. In between, he contested another Assembly election which he lost; he would lose again in the 2004 Lok Sabha elections later. He was also involved in the Latur earthquake relief activities and in the establishment of a Pani Parishad for the drought affected areas.

== Awards and honors ==
Shivaji University honored Naikwadi with the degree of DLitt (honoris causa) in 2008 and the Government of India awarded him the civilian honour of the Padma Bhushan in 2009. He was also a recipient of several other awards and honors. He died on 22 March 2012, at the age of 89, succumbing to age-related illnesses at Lilavati Hospital in Bandra, Mumbai, survived by his wife, Kusum, two sons, Vaibhav and Kiran and two daughters, Vishakha and Pragati. The sugar factory founded by Naikwadi in Walwa, Hutatma Kisan Ahir Sahakari Sakhar Kharkhana, has since been renamed as Padambhushan Krantiveer Dr. Nagnathanna Naikwadi Hutatma Kisan Ahir S. S. K. Limited in his honor. The Government of Maharashtra has constructed a memorial for him at his native place, at a cost of ₹150 million and with a constructed area of 18,000 sq.ft which houses a hall and a museum.

== See also ==
- Baburao Kokate
- Dhulappa Bhaurao Navale
- Nana Patil

Vaibhav Nayakawadi
