= Uran Islampur =

City in Sangli district, Maharashtra, India

- City in Maharashtra
- Ishwarpur
- Location in Maharashtra, India
- Coordinates: 17.050°N 74.267°E
- Country: India
- State: Maharashtra
- District: Sangli

Government
  - Type: Mayor - City President - Municipal Council
  - Body: Uran-Islampur Municipal Council

Area
  - Total: 40.42 km^{2} (15.61 sq mi)

Population (2011)
  - Total: 67,391
  - Density: 1,667/km^{2} (4,318/sq mi)

Language
  - Official: Marathi
- Time zone: UTC+5:30 (IST)
- PIN: 415409
- Vehicle registration: MH 10

Uran Islampur, officially Ishwarpur, is a city and a municipal council in Sangli district in the Indian state of Maharashtra.

The 2011 Census of India recorded a total of 67,391 residents in the town, predominantly Hindu and Muslim. Uran Islampur's geographical area is 40.42 square kilometres (15.61 sq mi). The town has "poor roads, lack of clean water and inadequate public facilities".

The oldest part of Islampur is known as Uran, and contains the Uranai Devi temple.

== History ==
Uran Islampur was probably established in the 16th or early 17th century when the area was ruled by the Sultanate of Bijapur.

There has been agitation to rename the town since the 1970s. Bal Thackeray (founder of Shiv Sena) made a public statement in 1986 that Islampur should be renamed Ishwarpur. More recently, Sambhaji Bhide's Shiv Pratisthan Hindustan organisation has agitated for this change. In 2020, Islampur Municipal Council (Islampur Nagar Parishad) rejected a proposal to change the name. But by 2025, the municipal council was no longer in place. Shiv Pratisthan Hindustan organised a petition to change the name and gathered about 10,000 signatures; this was presented to the district collector. After the proposal was approved by the Maharashtra state cabinet, the change was announced on 18 July 2025 by Chhagan Bhujbal (the Food and Civil Supplies Minister) in the Maharashtra Legislative Assembly. Supporters of the BJP-led state government, said that Ishwarpur reflected the town's historic identity; local historian Sachin Garud said that the real reason for the change was "a desire to erase traces of Islamic history." Jayant Patil, who represented the Islampur assembly constituency, opposed the change, saying that it did not reflect the preferences of the majority of residents.

The Survey of India accepted the proposal on 14 October 2025. Then the Department of Posts and Indian Railways were ordered to change the name on their systems. On 4 November 2025, the state development department issued an official notification (gazette) of the change, and renamed the municipal council Urun-Ishwarpur Nagar Parishad (Urun-Ishwarpur Municipal Council).

== Demographics ==
Historical population
| Year | Pop. | ±% |
|---|---|---|
| 1901 | 11,553 | — |
| 1911 | 8,574 | −25.8% |
| 1921 | 7,916 | −7.7% |
| 1931 | 10,737 | +35.6% |
| 1941 | 12,359 | +15.1% |
| 1951 | 16,113 | +30.4% |
| 1961 | 20,817 | +29.2% |
| 1971 | 27,160 | +30.5% |
| 1981 | 33,016 | +21.6% |
| 1991 | 42,459 | +28.6% |
| 2001 | 58,330 | +37.4% |
| 2011 | 67,391 | +15.5% |

== Government and politics ==
=== Municipal council elections ===
There were elections for the municipal council in December 2025. The Nationalist Congress Party (NCP-SP) won the post of post of council president, and 23 seats on the council. There are 30 wards.

== Education ==
=== Prakash Institute of Medical Sciences and Research ===
The Prakash Institute of Medical Sciences and Research is a private medical school and hospital that opened in Islampur in 2016. As of 2020, the hospital had 650 beds. There were 200 members of the faculty. The institute has a biometric attendance system using thumbprints linked to the faculty member's Aadhaar number. In January 2020, students alleged that staff were using thumb moulds to trick the system into recording people as present when they were absent. Students also alleged that many of the hospital's in- and out-patients existed only on paper. The Directorate of Medical Education and Research (DMER) responded to the complaints by visiting the hospital on 20 January 2020 and found that the wards were almost empty, and were unable to find senior doctors who were registered as present on the biometric attendance system. The hospital authorities prevented further inspection by the DMER.

In 2024, the DMER ordered an inquiry into nine medical colleges, including the Prakash Institute of Medical Sciences and Research. This was a result of complaints that these colleges had illegally collected excessive fees from students.
