= Tasgaon =

City in Maharashtra, India

- City
- Nickname: City of Grapes
- Location in Maharashtra, India
- Coordinates: 17.03°N 74.6°E
- Country: India
- State: Maharashtra
- District: Sangli

Government
  - Type: Municipal Council
  - Body: Tasgaon Municipal Council
- Elevation: 560 m (1,840 ft)

Population (2011)
  - Total: 37,945
- Demonym: Tasgaonkar

Languages
  - Official: Marathi
- Time zone: UTC+5:30 (IST)
- PIN: 416312
- Telephone code: 02346
- Vehicle registration: MH-10

Tasgaon (Marathi: tāsagāva, pronounced [ˈt̪aːsɡaːʋ] ) is a city and municipal council in Sangli district, Maharashtra, India. Known as the "City of Grapes," Tasgaon is a major centre for grape cultivation, raisin production, and agro-based industries. The city is also noted for its historic Ganpati Temple, Siddheshwar Temple, and notable cultural festivals. Tasgaon serves as the administrative headquarters of Tasgaon Taluka.

== History ==
Tasgaon's historical significance is documented in ancient inscriptions like the Tasgaon Tamrapat from the Yadava period (12th-13th century), linked to king Yadav Krishnadeva(Krishna) indicating its importance as a settlement in southern Maharashtra. In 1758, French philosopher Anquetil du Perron described Tasgaon as a fortified town with strong walls, towers, and a moat.

During the Maratha Empire, Tasgaon was granted as a Jagir (feudal estate) to Parshuram Bhau Patwardhan by Narayanrao Peshwa in 1774, establishing the Tasgaon Sansthan under the Patwardhan Dynasty. The sansthan was formalized in 1808. The Ganpati Temple, a symbol of the city's heritage, was initiated by Parshuram Bhau in 1779 and completed by his son, Appa Patwardhan, in 1799.

The Tasgaon Sansthan was annexed by the British in 1848 under the Doctrine of Lapse during the rule of Ganpatrao Patwardhan. After India's independence in 1947, Tasgaon became part of the South Satara district in 1949, renamed Sangli district in 1960. Today, Tasgaon is a growing urban centre with a strong agricultural economy.

== Geography ==
Tasgaon is located at 17.03°N 74.6°E, with an average elevation of 560 metres (1,837 feet). The city's fertile soil and irrigation systems, including local lakes and tankers, support extensive viticulture.

=== Climate ===
Tasgaon has a semi-arid climate with hot summers and mild winters. The table below summarizes average weather conditions:

Average Weather in Tasgaon
Month	Avg. High (°C)	Avg. Low (°C)	Rainfall (mm)
January	30	18	3
May	40	25	20
July	31	23	200
Annual	25.7 (avg. temp)	–	673

The monsoon (June–September) brings most of the annual rainfall.

== Demographics ==
According to the 2011 Census of India, Tasgaon city had a population of 37,945, with 52% males (19,732) and 48% females (18,213). The literacy rate was 88.02%, higher than the national average of 74.04%: male literacy was 92.98%, and female literacy was 82.87%. About 10.47% of the population was under 6 years of age.

The primary language spoken in Tasgaon is Marathi, reflecting its status as the official language of Maharashtra.

Gender distribution in Tasgaon (2011 Census)
1. Male (52.0%)
2. Female (48.0%)

== Government and politics ==
Tasgaon is governed by the Tasgaon Municipal Council, established in 1865 as a Class 'C' municipality with 19 wards. Elections occur every five years.

The city is part of the Tasgaon-Kavathe Mahankal assembly constituency and the Sangli Lok Sabha constituency. In the 2024 state elections, Rohit R.R. Patil of the Nationalist Congress Party (Sharadchandra Pawar) won the assembly seat.

== Economy ==
Tasgaon is a leading grape-producing region, with 9,236 hectares under cultivation in 2020–21, the highest in Sangli district. Varieties like Tas-A-Ganesh and Thompson Seedless are exported to the UK, UAE, Singapore, and Bangladesh. Tasgaon is a significant raisin market in India. Sugarcane processing at the Tasgaon Sugar Factory in nearby Turchi also contributes to the economy.

== Notable people ==
- R. R. Patil, former Deputy Chief Minister of Maharashtra (born in nearby Anjani)
