= Solapur Lok Sabha constituency =

Lok Sabha constituency in Maharashtra

Coordinates: 17.66°N 75.92°E

Solapur
- Lok Sabha constituency
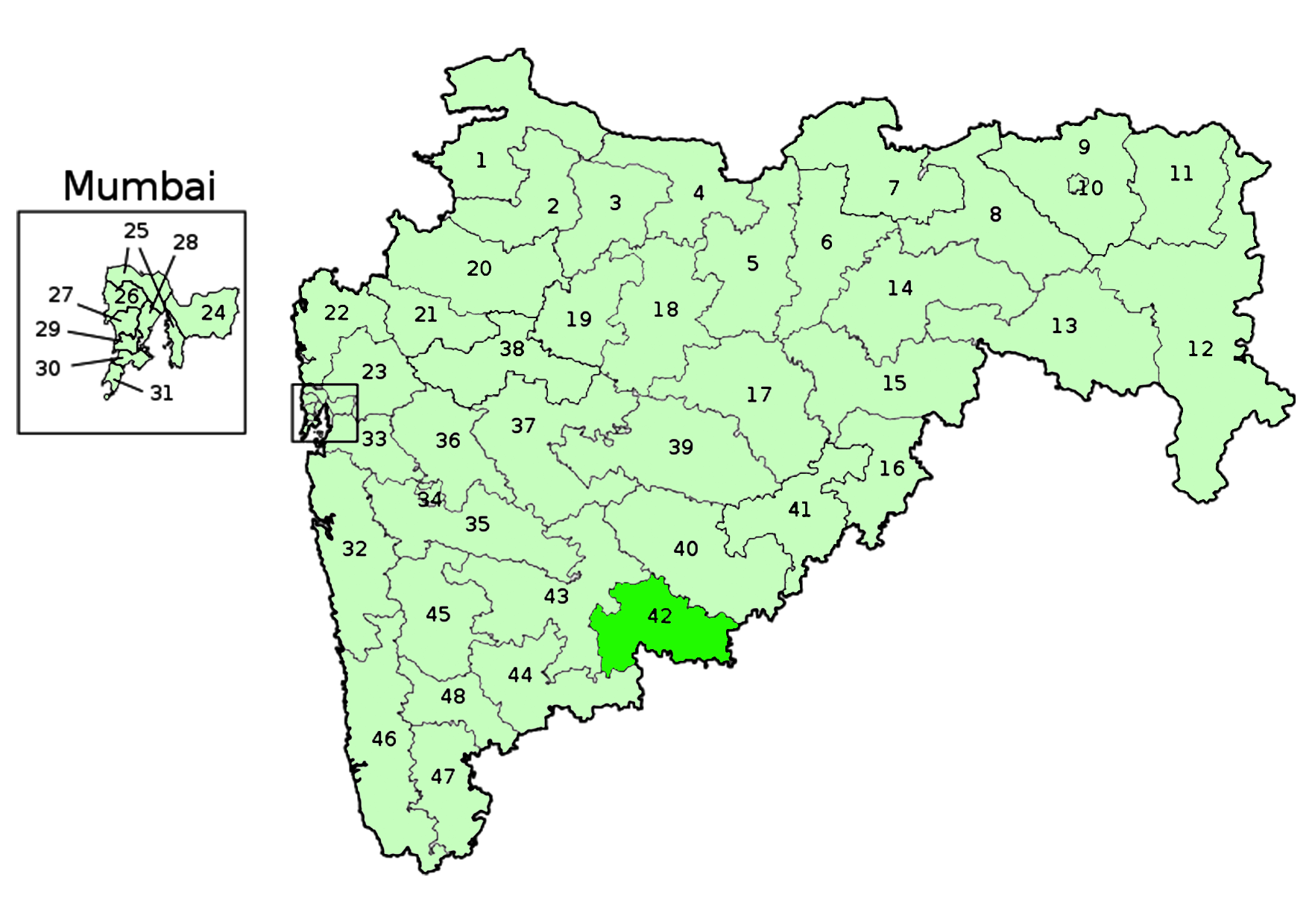
- Solapur Lok Sabha Constituency map

Constituency details
- Country: India
- Region: Western India
- State: Maharashtra
- District: Solapur
- Assembly constituencies: Mohol; Solapur City North; Solapur City Central; Akkalkot; Solapur South; Pandharpur
- Established: 1952
- Reservation: SC

Member of Parliament
- 18th Lok Sabha
- Incumbent Praniti Shinde
- Party: Indian National Congress
- Elected year: 2024

Solapur Lok Sabha constituency (42) is one of the 48 Lok Sabha (parliamentary) constituencies in Maharashtra state in western India.

== Overview ==
Solapur Lok Sabha constituency covers the district of Solapur. It is known for its significant political and cultural heritage in Maharashtra.

== Assembly segments ==
Solapur Lok Sabha constituency comprises the following legislative assembly segments:

- Mohol
- Solapur City North
- Solapur City Central
- Akkalkot
- Solapur South
- Pandharpur

== Vidhan Sabha segments ==
Presently, after delimitation, Solapur Lok Sabha constituency comprises the following six Vidhan Sabha (legislative assembly) segments:

| # | Name | District | Member | Party | Leading (in 2024) |
|---|---|---|---|---|---|
| 247 | Mohol (SC) | Solapur | Raju Khare | NCP-SP | INC |
| 248 | Solapur City North | Solapur | Vijay Deshmukh | BJP | BJP |
| 249 | Solapur City Central | Solapur | Devendra Kothe | BJP | INC |
| 250 | Akkalkot | Solapur | Sachin Kalyanshetti | BJP | BJP |
| 251 | Solapur South | Solapur | Subhash Deshmukh | BJP | INC |
| 252 | Pandharpur | Solapur | Samadhan Autade | BJP | INC |

== Members of Parliament ==
| Year | Member | Party |
|---|---|---|
| 1951 | Shankar More | Peasants and Workers Party of India |
| 1951 | P. N. Rajbhoj | Scheduled Castes Federation |
| 1957 | Jayawant More | Samyukta Maharashtra Samiti |
| 1957 | T. H. Sonawane | Indian National Congress |
| 1962 | Madeppa Kadadi | Indian National Congress |
| 1967 | Surajratan Damani | Indian National Congress |
| 1971 | Surajratan Damani | Indian National Congress |
| 1977 | Surajratan Damani | Indian National Congress |
| 1980 | Gangadharpant Kuchan | Indian National Congress (I) |
| 1984 | Gangadharpant Kuchan | Indian National Congress |
| 1989 | Dharmanna Sadul | Indian National Congress |
| 1991 | Dharmanna Sadul | Indian National Congress |
| 1996 | Lingaraj Valyal | Bharatiya Janata Party |
| 1998 | Sushilkumar Shinde | Indian National Congress |
| 1999 | Sushilkumar Shinde | Indian National Congress |
| 2003^ | Pratapsinh Mohite-Patil | Bharatiya Janata Party |
| 2004 | Subhash Deshmukh | Bharatiya Janata Party |
| 2009 | Sushilkumar Shinde | Indian National Congress |
| 2014 | Sharad Bansode | Bharatiya Janata Party |
| 2019 | Jaisidhesvar Swami | Bharatiya Janata Party |
| 2024 | Praniti Shinde | Indian National Congress |

^ by-poll

== Election results ==
=== 2024 ===
2024 Indian general elections: Solapur
| Party | Candidate | Votes | % | ±% |
|---|---|---|---|---|
| INC | Praniti Sushilkumar Shinde | 620,225 | 51.49 | ▲17.71 |
| BJP | Ram Satpute | 5,46,028 | 45.35 | ▼2.98 |
| Independent | Aatish Mohan Bansode | 10,507 | 0.87 | N/A |
| BSP | Bablu Sidram Gaikwad | 5,268 | 0.44 | N/A |
| NOTA | None of the Above | 2,725 | 0.23 | ▼0.34 |
| Majority | | 74,197 | 6.16 | ▼8.47 |
| Turnout | | 12,05,023 | 59.30 | ▲0.73 |
| INC gain from BJP | | Swing | | |

=== 2019 ===
2019 Indian general elections: Solapur
| Party | Candidate | Votes | % | ±% |
|---|---|---|---|---|
| BJP | Jaisidhesvar Swami | 524,985 | 48.33 | −6.10 |
| INC | Sushilkumar Shinde | 3,66,377 | 33.78 | −4.92 |
| VBA | Prakash Ambedkar | 1,70,007 | 15.68 | |
| NOTA | None of the Above | 6,191 | 0.57 | −0.88 |
| BMP | Prof. Dr. Arjun Gena Ohal | 3,880 | 0.36 | |
| Majority | | 1,58,608 | 14.63 | |
| Turnout | | 10,84,514 | 58.57 | |
| BJP hold | | Swing | | |

=== General elections 2014 ===
2014 Indian general elections: Solapur
| Party | Candidate | Votes | % | ±% |
|---|---|---|---|---|
| BJP | Sharad Bansode | 517,879 | 54.43 | +15.69 |
| INC | Sushilkumar Shinde | 368,205 | 38.70 | −13.45 |
| BSP | Adv Sanjeev Sidram Sadafule | 19,041 | 2.00 | −2.10 |
| NOTA | None of the Above | 13,778 | 1.45 | +1.45 |
| AAP | Lalit Babar | 9,261 | 0.97 | +0.97 |
| Majority | | 1,49,674 | 15.73 | |
| Turnout | | 9,51,510 | 55.88 | |
| BJP gain from INC | | Swing | | |

=== General Elections 2009 ===
2009 Indian general elections: Solapur
| Party | Candidate | Votes | % | ±% |
|---|---|---|---|---|
| INC | Sushilkumar Shinde | 387,591 | 52.15 | |
| BJP | Sharad Bansode | 287,959 | 38.74 | |
| BSP | Gaikwad Pramod Ramchandra | 30,457 | 4.10 | |
| IND | Bansode Uttam Bhimsha | 8,134 | 1.09 | |
| IND | Vijaykumar Bhagwanrao Ughade | 7,416 | 1.00 | |
| Majority | | 99,632 | 13.41 | |
| Turnout | | 7,43,222 | 46.62 | |
| INC gain from BJP | | Swing | | |

=== General Elections 2004 ===
2004 Indian general elections: Solapur
| Party | Candidate | Votes | % | ±% |
|---|---|---|---|---|
| BJP | Deshmukh Subhash Sureshchandra | 316,188 | 48.1 | |
| INC | Ujwalatai Sushilkumar Shinde | 3,10,390 | 47.2 | |
| BSP | Rahul Vitthalrao Sarvade | 12,067 | 1.84 | |
| Independent | Kisan Jakkan Nagmani | 8,503 | 1.29 | |
| RSPS | Prabhakar Sidram Salgar | 6,396 | 0.97 | |
| Majority | | 5,798 | 0.9 | |
| Turnout | | 6,57,089 | 55.4 | |
| BJP gain from INC | | Swing | | |

== See also ==
- Madha Lok Sabha constituency
- Pandharpur Lok Sabha constituency
- Solapur district
- List of constituencies of the Lok Sabha
