= Solapur City Central Assembly constituency =

Constituency of the Maharashtra legislative assembly in India

Coordinates: 17.663°N 75.916°E

Solapur City Central
- Constituency No. 249 for the Maharashtra Legislative Assembly
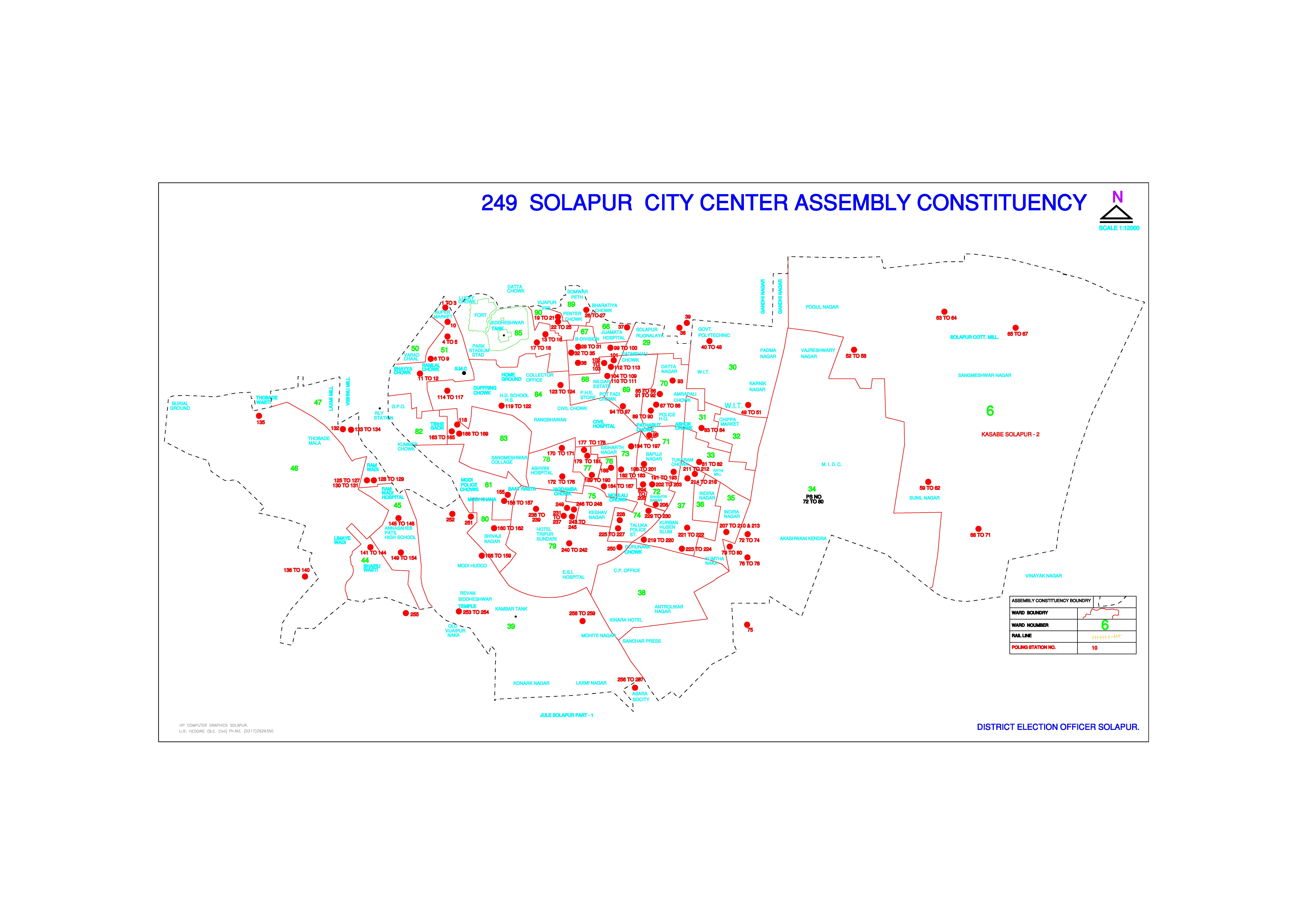
- Solapur City Central Assembly

Constituency details
- Country: India
- Region: Western India
- State: Maharashtra
- Division: Pune division
- District: Solapur
- Lok Sabha constituency: Solapur (SC)
- Established: 2008
- Total electors: 3,46,677 (2024)
- Reservation: None

Member of Legislative Assembly
- 15th Maharashtra Legislative Assembly
- Incumbent Devendra Rajesh Kothe
- Party: Bharatiya Janata Party
- Alliance: Maha Yuti
- Elected year: 2024
- Preceded by: Praniti Shinde

Solapur City Central Assembly constituency is one of the 288 Vidhan Sabha (legislative assembly) constituencies of Maharashtra state, western India. This constituency is located in Solapur district, of which Solapur city is the district headquarters, and is part of Solapur Lok Sabha constituency.

== Geographical scope ==
The constituency comprises ward nos.6, 29 to 39, 44 to 47, 50, 51, 66 to 85, 89 & 90 belong to Solapur Municipal Corporation lying in Solapur North taluka. Polling booth stations areas & addresses under constituency

Polling booth areas under constituency

Polling Booth Areas
Murarji Peth Faujdar Chavadi,

Tukaram Chowk Gengatyal Takij Javal, Shastri Nagar, Kidvai Chowk, Ashok Chowk New Pachchha Peth, New Pachchha Peth Dat Nagar Karnik Nagar, Kasabe Solapur Akalakot Road M. I D. C, Kidvai Chowk, Prabhat Talkies Saraswati Chowk, Kidvai Chowk, Ramlal Chowk, Rimandahom, Reba Nagar, Asvini Rugnalay Javal, Siddheshwar Peth, Juna Employment Chowk, Juna Employment Chowk Wadiya Haspital Javal, Abdulpur Kar Mangal Karyalay, Asvini Rugnalay Javal, Kasabe Solapur Akalakot Road M. I D. C, Begum Peth Police Chowki, Sunil Nagar, Siddheshwar Peth, Murarji Peth Faujdar Chavadi, Ashwini Rugnalay Javal, Bapuji Nagar, Majarevadi, Ramavadi Limayevadi, Police Mukhyalay, Begum Peth, Daji Peth Post Office, District & Sessions Court, Dufferin Chowk, Garibi Hatao Jhopadpatti, Gandhi Nagar, Gentyal Chowk, Government Remand Home, Gurunanak Chowk, Guruwar Peth, Haribhai Devkaran High School, Hotgi Road, Hudco Colony, Jail Road, Jodbasavanna Chowk, Karnik Nagar, Lashkar, Laxmi Vishnu Chawl, Saibaba Chowk, Modi Khana, Muslim Pachha Peth, Patharut Chowk, Police Headquarters, Ramwadi, Rote Complex, Sainath Nagar, Saat Rasta, Settlement Area, Shanti Chowk, Shivganga Nagar, South Sadar Bazar, Thobde Vasti - Hanuman Temple, Telangi Pachha Peth

== Members of Legislative Assembly ==
Year	Member	Party
Before 2008 : See Solapur City North and Solapur South
2009	Praniti Shinde	Indian National Congress
2014	Praniti Shinde	Indian National Congress
2019	Praniti Shinde	Indian National Congress
2024	Devendra Kothe	Bharatiya Janata Party

== Election results ==
=== Assembly Election 2024 ===
2024 Maharashtra Legislative Assembly election : Solapur City Central
Party	Candidate	Votes	%	±%
BJP	Devendra Rajesh Kothe	110,278	54.86	New
AIMIM	Haji Farooq Maqbool Shabdi	61,428	30.56	▲7.43
INC	Chetan Pandit Narote	16,385	8.15	▼22.57
CPI(M)	Adam Narsayya Narayan	6,816	3.39	▼2.88
VBA	Shriniwas Rangappa Sangepag	1,563	0.78	▼0.88
NOTA	None of the Above	557	0.28	▼0.20
Margin of victory		48,850	24.30	▲16.71
Turnout		201,557	58.13	▲2.57
Total valid votes		201,000		
Registered electors		346,722		
BJP gain from INC		Swing	▲24.14	

=== Assembly Election 2019 ===
2019 Maharashtra Legislative Assembly election : Solapur City Central
Party	Candidate	Votes	%	±%
INC	Praniti Sushilkumar Shinde	51,440	30.73	▲1.74
AIMIM	Haji Farooq Maqbool Shabdi	38,721	23.13	▲0.18
Independent	Kothe Mahesh Vishnupant	30,081	17.97	New
SS	Dilip Mane	29,247	17.47	▼3.13
CPI(M)	Adam Narsayya Narayan	10,505	6.27	▼2.32
VBA	Imtiyaj Abdulmannan Peerjade	2,767	1.65	New
NOTA	None of the Above	807	0.48	▲0.18
Margin of victory		12,719	7.60	▲1.56
Turnout		168,334		▼2.77
Total valid votes		167,414		
Registered electors		302,160		
INC hold		Swing	▲1.74	

=== Assembly Election 2014 ===
2014 Maharashtra Legislative Assembly election : Solapur City Central
Party	Candidate	Votes	%	±%
INC	Praniti Sushilkumar Shinde	46,907	28.98	▼20.73
AIMIM	Shekh Taufik Is Mail	37,138	22.95	New
SS	Kothe Mahesh Vishnupant	33,334	20.60	▲1.19
BJP	Patki Mohini Vijay	23,319	14.41	New
CPI(M)	Adam Narsayya Narayan	13,904	8.59	▼16.74
BSP	Shailendra Sudam Waghmare	1,410	0.87	▼1.45
NOTA	None of the Above	483	0.30	New
Margin of victory		9,769	6.04	▼18.34
Turnout		163,043		▲10.17
Total valid votes		161,836		
Registered electors		278,177		
INC hold		Swing	▼20.73	

=== Assembly Election 2009 ===
2009 Maharashtra Legislative Assembly election : Solapur City Central
Party	Candidate	Votes	%	±%
INC	Praniti Sushilkumar Shinde	68,028	49.71	New
CPI(M)	Adam Narsayya Narayan	34,664	25.33	New
SS	Barde Purushottam Dattatray	26,562	19.41	New
BSP	Shaikh A Rajak Nabilal	3,174	2.32	New
Independent	Vikram Uttam Kasbe	1,293	0.94	New
MNS	Chavan Yashwant Limbaji	1,080	0.79	New
Margin of victory		33,364	24.38	
Turnout		136,855	48.01	
Total valid votes		136,851		
Registered electors		285,075		
INC win (new seat)				
