= Adam Narsayya Narayan =

Indian politician

Member of Maharashtra Legislative Assembly
- In office 2004–2009
- Constituency: Solapur City South
- In office 1995–1999
- Constituency: Solapur City South
- In office 1978–1980
- Constituency: Solapur City North

Personal details
- Party: Communist Party of India (Marxist)

Adam Narsayya Narayan, popularly known as Adam Master is an Indian politician from the Communist Party of India (Marxist) and a leader of the Centre for Indian Trade Unions (CITU). He has served as member of the Maharashtra Legislative Assembly between 2004–2009 and 1995–1999 elected from Solapur City South, and between 1978 and 1980 elected from Solapur City North. Adam Master is known for leading a movement to ensure affordable housing through cooperatives and government funding, for impoverished workers living in slums in Solapur, under a CITU housing project and in association with the Democratic Youth Federation of India (DYFI). It led to the construction of 15,000 houses between 2001 and 2018, and the eventual release of funding for 30,000 more afterwards. Prior to joining politics, he was a teacher of Mathematics due to which he became popularly known as "Master".

Adam Narsayya had extended support to Praniti Shinde who contested and won from Solapur in the 2024 general election and was promised support for his candidacy from Solapur City Central in the upcoming state election from the Indian National Congress. The party rescinded on its promise and has led to a contest between INC and him from the CPI(M) in Solapur City Central with him contesting his last election due to age.
