= Yashwant Mane =

Indian politician

Member of Maharashtra Legislative Assembly
- In office 2019 – 23 November 2024
- Preceded by: Ramesh Kadam
- Succeeded by: Raju Khare
- Constituency: Mohol

Personal details
- Party: Bharatiya Janata Party
- Other political affiliations: Nationalist Congress Party
- Occupation: Politician

Yashwant Mane is a leader of Bharatiya Janata Party who served as member of the Maharashtra Legislative Assembly elected from Mohol Assembly constituency.
