= Subhash Deshmukh =

Indian politician

Subhash Sureshchandra Deshmukh
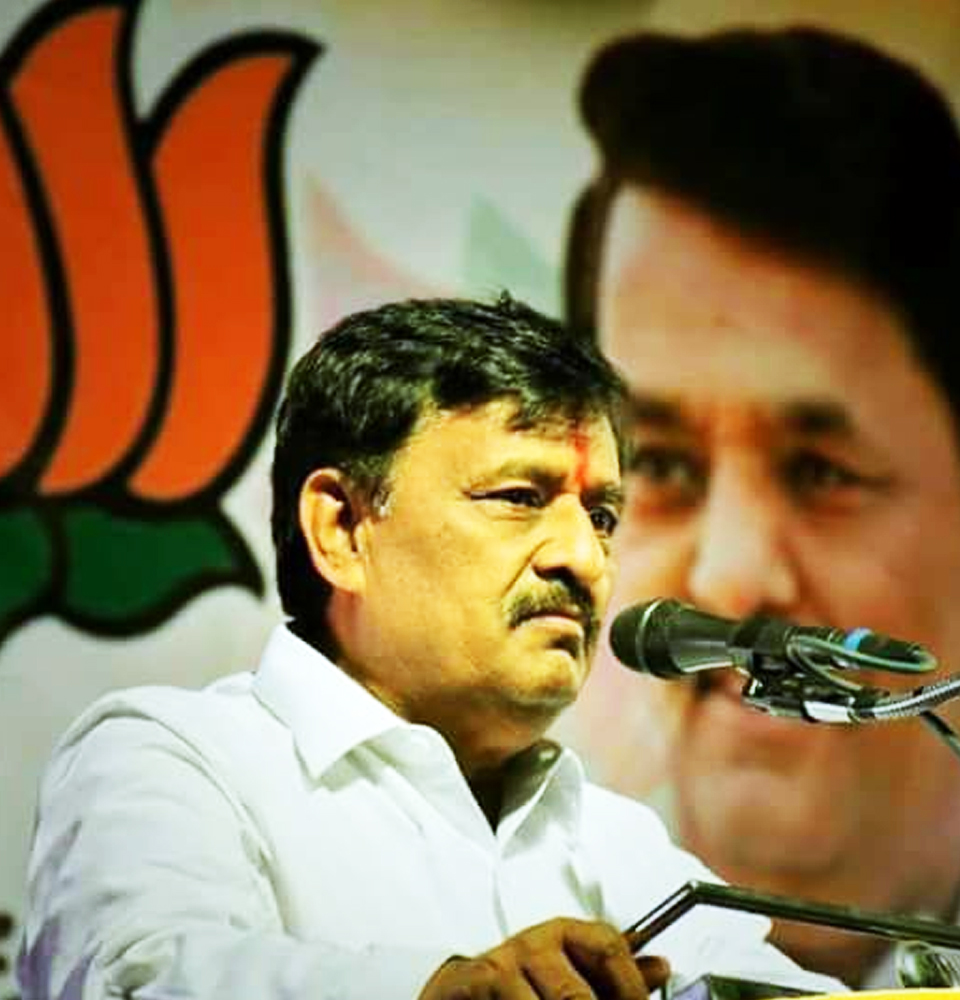

Minister of Co-operation Government of Maharashtra
- In office 8 July 2016 – 12 November 2019
- Chief Minister: Devendra Fadnavis
- Preceded by: Chandrakant Patil
- Succeeded by: Shamrao Pandurang Patil

Minister of Textiles Government of Maharashtra
- In office 8 July 2016 – 16 June 2019
- Chief Minister: Devendra Fadnavis
- Preceded by: Chandrakant Patil
- Succeeded by: Ram Shinde

Member of the Maharashtra Legislative Assembly
- Incumbent
- Assumed office 2014
- Preceded by: Dilip Mane
- Constituency: Solapur South

Member of Parliament, Lok Sabha
- In office 2004–2009
- Preceded by: Pratapsinh Mohite-Patil
- Succeeded by: Sushilkumar Shinde
- Constituency: Solapur

Member of the Maharashtra Legislative Council
- In office 1998–2004
- Constituency: Solapur Local Authorities

Personal details
- Born: 12 March 1957 (age 69) Solapur, Bombay State, India
- Party: Bharatiya Janata Party
- Spouse: Smita Deshmukh (m. 1980)
- Children: 2 sons, 1 daughter

Subhash Sureshchandra Deshmukh (born 12 March 1957) is an Indian politician and a member of the Bharatiya Janata Party (BJP). Deshmukh represents the Solapur South constituency in the Maharashtra Legislative Assembly. He served as the Cabinet Minister of Co-Operation, Relief and Rehabilitation in the Government of Maharashtra.

== Positions held ==
=== Lokmangal Group ===
Deshmukh is the founder of Lokmangal Group.

Deshmukh is the founder of Solapur Social Foundation.

=== Within BJP ===
- Vice President, BJP Maharashtra (2010-2013)

=== Legislative ===
- Member, Solapur - 2004-2009
- Member, Maharashtra Legislative Assembly - 2014
- Cabinet Minister for Co-Operation, Marketing & Textiles, Maharashtra State, 2016-2019
- Cabinet Minister for Co-Operation, Relief and Rehabilitation, Maharashtra State, 2019–Present

== Early life ==
Subhash Sureshchandra Deshmukh was born on 12 March 1957 in Wadala (North Solapur). He belongs to the family who believes in discipline, education, social commitment and religious accountability. Being primary school teachers, his parents were known for their disciplined personalities. While handling farming, they served for education. Having Wari tradition in the home, he was raised in the devotional atmosphere. He was raised with values such as hard work, discipline, patriotism and social work.

== Political career ==
He took oath as Maharashtra Cabinet Minister on 7 July 2016. He was allotted Ministry of Co-Operation, Relief and Rehabilitation.

He is known for his organizational and communication skills. He connected the ones who wanted to work for the progress of Solapur.

January 1998 : Won the Legislative Council election as MLA, Solapur

2000 : BJP District President, Tarun Bharat President, Solapur

2004 : Maharashtra Sahakar Aghadi: State President, Maharashtra State, Won Lok Sabha Election from Solapur Lok Sabha Constituency and was elected as MP

2009 : Madha Lok Sabha Election, Osmanabad-Tuljapur Legislative Assembly (Vidhan Sabha) Election

2014 : BJP State Vice President, Maharashtra State, Won Legislative Assembly (Vidhan Sabha) Election

2016 : He took oath as a Maharashtra Cabinet Minister on 7 July 2016. He was allotted the Ministry of Co-operation, Marketing and Textiles.

== See also ==
- Devendra Fadnavis ministry (2014–)
- Politics of Maharashtra
- Government of Maharashtra
- Narendra Modi
