= Mohol Assembly constituency =

Constituency of the Maharashtra legislative assembly in India

Coordinates: 17.80°N 75.64°E

Mohol
- Constituency No. 247 for the Maharashtra Legislative Assembly

Constituency details
- Country: India
- Region: Western India
- State: Maharashtra
- District: Solapur
- Lok Sabha constituency: Solapur
- Established: 1951
- Total electors: 331,882
- Reservation: SC

Member of Legislative Assembly
- 15th Maharashtra Legislative Assembly
- Incumbent Raju Khare
- Party: NCP-SP
- Alliance: MVA
- Elected year: 2024

Mohol Assembly constituency is one of the 288 Vidhan Sabha constituencies of Maharashtra state in western India and located in Solapur district. It is reserved for an SC Candidate.

It is a part of Solapur Lok Sabha constituency.

== Members of the Legislative Assembly ==
Year	Member	Party
1952 Election see: Madha Mohol
1967	G. B. Buragute	Indian National Congress
1972	Shahajirao Shankarrao Patil	Indian National Congress
1978	Shahajirao Shankarrao Patil	Indian National Congress (I)
1980	Chandrakant Dattaji Nimbalkar	Peasants and Workers Party of India
1985	Shahajirao Shankarrao Patil	Indian National Congress
1990	Chandrakant Dattaji Nimbalkar	Peasants and Workers Party of India
1995	Rajan Baburao Patil	Indian National Congress
1999	Rajan Baburao Patil	Nationalist Congress Party
2004	Rajan Baburao Patil	Nationalist Congress Party
2009	Laxman Kondiba Dhobale	Nationalist Congress Party
2014	Ramesh Kadam	Nationalist Congress Party
2019	Yashwant Mane	Nationalist Congress Party
2024	Raju Khare	Nationalist Congress Party – Sharadchandra Pawar

== Election results ==
=== Assembly Election 2024 ===
2024 Maharashtra Legislative Assembly election : Mohol
Party	Candidate	Votes	%	±%
NCP-SP	Raju Khare	125,838	54.54%	New
NCP	Yashwant Vitthal Mane	95,636	41.45%	New
Independent	Aakhade Anil Narsinh	4,251	1.84%	New
NOTA	None of the Above	2,047	0.89%	▲0.42
Margin of victory		30,202	13.09%	▲2.29
Turnout		232,784	70.14%	▲3.86
Total valid votes		230,737		
Registered electors		331,882		▲8.49
NCP-SP gain from NCP		Swing	▲9.47	

=== Assembly Election 2019 ===
2019 Maharashtra Legislative Assembly election : Mohol
Party	Candidate	Votes	%	±%
NCP	Yashwant Vitthal Mane	90,532	45.07%	▲12.51
SS	Kshirsagar Nagnath Dattatray	68,833	34.27%	▲12.00
Independent	Ramesh Nagnath Kadam	23,649	11.77%	New
VBA	Gautam Kisan Vadave	6,429	3.20%	New
Independent	Shejwal Manoj Bhaskarrao	3,822	1.90%	New
Independent	Rajendra Shivaji Shinde	1,765	0.88%	New
MNS	Dr. Hanumant Bhagwan Bhosale	1,471	0.73%	▼0.59
NOTA	None of the Above	940	0.47%	▲0.01
Margin of victory		21,699	10.80%	▲6.42
Turnout		201,808	65.97%	▼0.83
Total valid votes		200,868		
Registered electors		305,901		▲6.63
NCP hold		Swing	▲12.51	

=== Assembly Election 2014 ===
2014 Maharashtra Legislative Assembly election : Mohol
Party	Candidate	Votes	%	±%
NCP	Ramesh Kadam	62,120	32.56%	▼20.14
BJP	Kshirsagar Sanjay Dattatraya	53,753	28.18%	New
SS	Shejwal Manoj Bhaskar	42,478	22.27%	▲16.03
Independent	Laxman Kondiba Dhoble	12,014	6.30%	New
INC	Kharat Gaurav Gautam	8,297	4.35%	New
MNS	Gavali Deepak Appaso	2,528	1.33%	New
BSP	Samjik Shankar Karande	2,187	1.15%	▼0.39
NOTA	None of the Above	868	0.46%	New
Margin of victory		8,367	4.39%	▼14.45
Turnout		192,077	66.95%	▲7.08
Total valid votes		190,768		
Registered electors		286,894		▲10.05
NCP hold		Swing	▼20.14	

=== Assembly Election 2009 ===
2009 Maharashtra Legislative Assembly election : Mohol
Party	Candidate	Votes	%	±%
NCP	Dhobale Laxman Kondiba	81,631	52.70%	▼7.14
Independent	Kshirsagar Nagnath Dattatray	52,452	33.86%	New
SS	Khandhare Uttamprakash Baburao	9,666	6.24%	▼30.28
RPI	Gautam Kisan Vadave	4,356	2.81%	New
BSP	Suraj Alias Vinod Yuvraj Kambale	2,386	1.54%	▲0.20
Independent	Honkalas Shivaji Mahadev	1,420	0.92%	New
Margin of victory		29,179	18.84%	▼4.48
Turnout		155,285	59.57%	▼16.92
Total valid votes		154,886		
Registered electors		260,690		▲48.62
NCP hold		Swing	▼7.14	

=== Assembly Election 2004 ===
2004 Maharashtra Legislative Assembly election : Mohol
Party	Candidate	Votes	%	±%
NCP	Patil Rajan Baburao	80,128	59.84%	▲5.11
SS	Nimbalkar Chandrakant Dattaji	48,903	36.52%	▼1.12
BSP	Imam (Imamkhan) Husen Mujawar	1,798	1.34%	▲0.83
RSPS	Devidas Chandrabhan Chendage	1,598	1.19%	New
Independent	Gaikwad Raghunath Eknath	1,475	1.10%	New
Margin of victory		31,225	23.32%	▲6.24
Turnout		134,015	76.40%	▲6.16
Total valid votes		133,902		
Registered electors		175,407		▲17.91
NCP hold		Swing	▲5.11	

=== Assembly Election 1999 ===
1999 Maharashtra Legislative Assembly election : Mohol
Party	Candidate	Votes	%	±%
NCP	Rajan Baburao Patil	57,135	54.73%	New
SS	Nimbalkar Chandrakant Dattaji	39,300	37.64%	▲21.61
INC	Gund Devanand Raosaheb	7,436	7.12%	▼41.01
Margin of victory		17,835	17.08%	▲2.98
Turnout		111,923	75.24%	▼10.87
Total valid votes		104,402		
Registered electors		148,760		▲6.84
NCP gain from INC		Swing	▲6.60	

=== Assembly Election 1995 ===
1995 Maharashtra Legislative Assembly election : Mohol
Party	Candidate	Votes	%	±%
INC	Patil Rajan Baburao	54,320	48.13%	▲5.65
PWPI	Nimbalkar Chandrakant Dattaji	38,398	34.02%	▼17.14
SS	Gaikwad Dipak Chandrakant	18,097	16.04%	▲10.01
Independent	Parsunde Naganath Maruti	1,182	1.05%	New
Margin of victory		15,922	14.11%	▲5.42
Turnout		115,807	83.17%	▲11.14
Total valid votes		112,859		
Registered electors		139,241		▲0.61
INC gain from PWPI		Swing	▼3.04	

=== Assembly Election 1990 ===
1990 Maharashtra Legislative Assembly election : Mohol
Party	Candidate	Votes	%	±%
PWPI	Nimbalkar Chandrakant Dattaji	49,505	51.17%	▲1.26
INC	Shahjiroa Shankarrao Patil	41,098	42.48%	▼7.62
SS	Mote Mahadeo Maruti	5,829	6.02%	New
Margin of victory		8,407	8.69%	▲8.49
Turnout		98,384	71.09%	▼3.89
Total valid votes		96,753		
Registered electors		138,390		▲19.22
PWPI gain from INC		Swing	▲1.07	

=== Assembly Election 1985 ===
1985 Maharashtra Legislative Assembly election : Mohol
Party	Candidate	Votes	%	±%
INC	Shahjiroa Shankarrao Patil	42,919	50.10%	New
PWPI	Patil Baburao Bajirao	42,752	49.90%	▼0.32
Margin of victory		167	0.19%	▼0.25
Turnout		87,113	75.05%	▲0.28
Total valid votes		85,671		
Registered electors		116,076		▲15.41
INC gain from PWPI		Swing	▼0.13	

=== Assembly Election 1980 ===
1980 Maharashtra Legislative Assembly election : Mohol
Party	Candidate	Votes	%	±%
PWPI	Nimbalkar Chandrakant Dattaji	37,143	50.22%	▲17.70
INC(I)	Shahjiroa Shankarrao Patil	36,812	49.78%	▲9.95
Margin of victory		331	0.45%	▼6.85
Turnout		75,422	74.99%	▼0.43
Total valid votes		73,955		
Registered electors		100,579		▲10.65
PWPI gain from INC(I)		Swing	▲10.40	

=== Assembly Election 1978 ===
1978 Maharashtra Legislative Assembly election : Mohol
Party	Candidate	Votes	%	±%
INC(I)	Shahjiroa Shankarrao Patil	26,771	39.82%	New
PWPI	Nimbalkar Chandrakant Dattaji	21,863	32.52%	▼13.11
INC	Kade Dyanoba Muralidhar	18,150	27.00%	▼27.36
Independent	Dhotre Kaluram Ramaji	439	0.65%	New
Margin of victory		4,908	7.30%	▼1.42
Turnout		69,326	76.27%	▲2.80
Total valid votes		67,223		
Registered electors		90,897		▲1.36
INC(I) gain from INC		Swing	▼14.54	

=== Assembly Election 1972 ===
1972 Maharashtra Legislative Assembly election : Mohol
Party	Candidate	Votes	%	±%
INC	Shahaji Rao Patil	34,688	54.36%	▲15.94
PWPI	Chandrakant Nimbalkar	29,121	45.64%	▲26.09
Margin of victory		5,567	8.72%	▲2.96
Turnout		65,682	73.24%	▲8.83
Total valid votes		63,809		
Registered electors		89,676		▲10.01
INC hold		Swing	▲15.94	

=== Assembly Election 1967 ===
1967 Maharashtra Legislative Assembly election : Mohol
Party	Candidate	Votes	%	±%
INC	G. B. Buragute	19,523	38.42%	New
Independent	D. M. Kade	16,593	32.66%	New
PWPI	C. D. Nimbalkar	9,933	19.55%	New
Independent	H. N. Jadhav	3,706	7.29%	New
Independent	T. G. Barakade	1,055	2.08%	New
Margin of victory		2,930	5.77%	
Turnout		55,490	68.07%	
Total valid votes		50,810		
Registered electors		81,519		
INC win (new seat)				

== See also ==
- Mohol
