= Akkalkot Assembly constituency =

Constituency of the Maharashtra legislative assembly in India

Akkalkot
- Constituency No. 250 for the Maharashtra Legislative Assembly

Constituency details
- Country: India
- Region: Western India
- State: Maharashtra
- District: Solapur
- Lok Sabha constituency: Solapur
- Established: 1957
- Total electors: 383,913
- Reservation: None

Member of Legislative Assembly
- 15th Maharashtra Legislative Assembly
- Incumbent Sachin Kalyanshetti
- Party: Bharatiya Janata Party
- Elected year: 2019

Akkalkot Assembly constituency is one of the 288 Vidhan Sabha (legislative assembly) constituencies of Maharashtra state, western India. This constituency is located in Solapur district. It is a segment of Solapur (Lok Sabha constituency).

== Geographical scope ==
The constituency comprises Akkalkot taluka and Boramani, Musti and Valsang revenue circles of Solapur South taluka.

== Members of the Legislative Assembly ==
| Year | Member | Party |
|---|---|---|
| 1957 | Chhanusing Chandele | Indian National Congress |
| 1962 | Nirmalaraje Bhonsle | Indian National Congress |
| 1967 | Nirmalaraje Bhonsle | Indian National Congress |
| 1972 | Baburao Mane | Indian National Congress |
| 1978 | Inayatalli Imamsaheb Patel | Janata Party |
| 1980 | Parvati Malgonda | Indian National Congress (I) |
| 1985 | Mahadeo Patil | Indian National Congress |
| 1990 | Mahadeo Patil | Indian National Congress |
| 1995 | Babasaheb Tanawade | Bharatiya Janata Party |
| 1999 | Siddharam Mhetre | Indian National Congress |
| 2004 | Siddharam Mhetre | Indian National Congress |
| 2009 | Sidramappa Patil | Bharatiya Janata Party |
| 2014 | Siddharam Mhetre | Indian National Congress |
| 2019 | Sachin Kalyanshetti | Bharatiya Janata Party |
| 2024 | Sachin Kalyanshetti | Bharatiya Janata Party |

== Election results ==
=== Assembly Election 2024 ===
2024 Maharashtra Legislative Assembly election : Akkalkot
| Party | Candidate | Votes | % | ±% |
|---|---|---|---|---|
| BJP | Sachin Kalyanshetti | 148,105 | 57.88 | ▲1.62 |
| INC | Siddharam Satlingappa Mhetre | 98,533 | 38.51 | ▼0.43 |
| VBA | Santoshkumar Khandu Ingale | 3,807 | 1.49 | ▼1.63 |
| NOTA | None of the Above | 1,104 | 0.43 | ▼0.12 |
| Margin of victory | | 49,572 | 19.37 | ▲2.05 |
| Turnout | | 256,999 | 66.94 | ▲5.38 |
| Total valid votes | | 255,895 | | |
| Registered electors | | 383,913 | | ▲10.80 |
| BJP hold | | Swing | ▲1.62 | |

=== Assembly Election 2019 ===
2019 Maharashtra Legislative Assembly election : Akkalkot
| Party | Candidate | Votes | % | ±% |
|---|---|---|---|---|
| BJP | Sachin Kalyanshetti | 119,437 | 56.25 | ▲18.63 |
| INC | Siddharam Satlingappa Mhetre | 82,668 | 38.94 | ▼7.02 |
| VBA | Dharmraj Kashiram Rathod | 6,630 | 3.12 | New |
| NOTA | None of the Above | 1,168 | 0.55 | New |
| Margin of victory | | 36,769 | 17.32 | ▲8.99 |
| Turnout | | 213,570 | 61.64 | ▼2.32 |
| Total valid votes | | 212,322 | | |
| Registered electors | | 346,498 | | ▲4.05 |
| BJP gain from INC | | Swing | ▲10.30 | |

=== Assembly Election 2014 ===
2014 Maharashtra Legislative Assembly election : Akkalkot
| Party | Candidate | Votes | % | ±% |
|---|---|---|---|---|
| INC | Siddharam Satlingappa Mhetre | 97,333 | 45.96 | ▼0.60 |
| BJP | Patil Sidramappa Malakappa | 79,689 | 37.63 | ▼9.63 |
| MNS | Shabdi Faruk Maqbool | 22,651 | 10.69 | New |
| BSP | Chandrakant Kondiba Ingle | 3,891 | 1.84 | ▲0.57 |
| AIMIM | Subhash Anandrao Shinde | 1,642 | 0.78 | New |
| SS | Pawar Manojkumar Somalu | 1,607 | 0.76 | New |
| NCP | Dilip(Bhau) Kerba Siddhe | 1,516 | 0.72 | New |
| NOTA | None of the Above | 1,136 | 0.54 | New |
| Margin of victory | | 17,644 | 8.33 | ▲7.62 |
| Turnout | | 212,944 | 63.95 | ▼1.45 |
| Total valid votes | | 211,793 | | |
| Registered electors | | 333,001 | | ▲10.68 |
| INC gain from BJP | | Swing | ▼1.30 | |

=== Assembly Election 2009 ===
2009 Maharashtra Legislative Assembly election : Akkalkot
| Party | Candidate | Votes | % | ±% |
|---|---|---|---|---|
| BJP | Patil Sidramappa Malakappa | 92,496 | 47.26 | ▲5.46 |
| INC | Siddharam Satlingappa Mhetre | 91,111 | 46.55 | ▼5.65 |
| Independent | Ingale Chandrakant Kondiba | 3,413 | 1.74 | New |
| RSPS | Bandgar Sunil Shivaji | 2,567 | 1.31 | New |
| BSP | Ghatkamble Yallappa Mahadev | 2,477 | 1.27 | ▼0.13 |
| Independent | Mulla Hamid Ibrahim | 1,983 | 1.01 | New |
| Margin of victory | | 1,385 | 0.71 | ▼9.69 |
| Turnout | | 195,970 | 65.13 | ▼3.78 |
| Total valid votes | | 195,717 | | |
| Registered electors | | 300,871 | | ▲72.41 |
| BJP gain from INC | | Swing | ▼4.94 | |

=== Assembly Election 2004 ===
2004 Maharashtra Legislative Assembly election : Akkalkot
| Party | Candidate | Votes | % | ±% |
|---|---|---|---|---|
| INC | Siddharam Satlingappa Mhetre | 62,701 | 52.20 | ▲8.55 |
| BJP | Patil Sidramappa Malakappa | 50,207 | 41.80 | ▲4.34 |
| JSS | Minakshitai Suresh Patil | 1,798 | 1.50 | New |
| BSP | Bhalerao Madhu Sham | 1,671 | 1.39 | New |
| Independent | Wange Shivaningappa Gurusidhappa | 1,538 | 1.28 | New |
| Independent | Peerzade Patil Wahidpasha Moddinpasha | 1,114 | 0.93 | New |
| Margin of victory | | 12,494 | 10.40 | ▲4.22 |
| Turnout | | 120,311 | 68.94 | ▲1.17 |
| Total valid votes | | 120,113 | | |
| Registered electors | | 174,504 | | ▲25.95 |
| INC hold | | Swing | ▲8.55 | |

=== Assembly Election 1999 ===
1999 Maharashtra Legislative Assembly election : Akkalkot
| Party | Candidate | Votes | % | ±% |
|---|---|---|---|---|
| INC | Siddharam Satlingappa Mhetre | 40,917 | 43.65 | ▲13.80 |
| BJP | Patil Suresh Shamrao | 35,118 | 37.46 | ▲3.11 |
| NCP | Tinwala M. Shafi Gulabso | 17,703 | 18.89 | New |
| Margin of victory | | 5,799 | 6.19 | ▲1.69 |
| Turnout | | 96,764 | 69.84 | ▼9.69 |
| Total valid votes | | 93,738 | | |
| Registered electors | | 138,548 | | ▲3.87 |
| INC gain from BJP | | Swing | ▲9.30 | |

=== Assembly Election 1995 ===
1995 Maharashtra Legislative Assembly election : Akkalkot
| Party | Candidate | Votes | % | ±% |
|---|---|---|---|---|
| BJP | Tanawade Babasaheb Sharannappa | 35,442 | 34.35 | ▼11.99 |
| INC | Tinwala M. Shafi Gulabso | 30,802 | 29.85 | ▼18.54 |
| Independent | Patil Sidramappa Malakappa | 19,937 | 19.32 | New |
| Independent | Inagale Chandrakant Kondiba | 13,667 | 13.25 | New |
| Independent | Khalifa Harun Rashid Dawood | 791 | 0.77 | New |
| Margin of victory | | 4,640 | 4.50 | ▲2.44 |
| Turnout | | 105,266 | 78.92 | ▲11.79 |
| Total valid votes | | 103,173 | | |
| Registered electors | | 133,389 | | ▼1.68 |
| BJP gain from INC | | Swing | ▼14.05 | |

=== Assembly Election 1990 ===
1990 Maharashtra Legislative Assembly election : Akkalkot
| Party | Candidate | Votes | % | ±% |
|---|---|---|---|---|
| INC | Patil Mahadeo Kashiraya | 43,045 | 48.40 | ▼13.44 |
| BJP | Tanawade Babasaheb Sharannappa | 41,213 | 46.34 | ▲11.46 |
| JD | Patil Parmoshwar Yashwantaro | 3,574 | 4.02 | New |
| Margin of victory | | 1,832 | 2.06 | ▼24.90 |
| Turnout | | 90,524 | 66.73 | ▲3.49 |
| Total valid votes | | 88,939 | | |
| Registered electors | | 135,664 | | ▲24.52 |
| INC hold | | Swing | ▼13.44 | |

=== Assembly Election 1985 ===
1985 Maharashtra Legislative Assembly election : Akkalkot
| Party | Candidate | Votes | % | ±% |
|---|---|---|---|---|
| INC | Patil Mahadeo Kashiraya | 41,817 | 61.84 | New |
| BJP | Khedagi Chandabasappa Baslingappa | 23,585 | 34.88 | ▲3.50 |
| Independent | Madikhambe Sharanapp Adappa | 1,371 | 2.03 | New |
| Independent | Mulla Raje Ahamed Daudsaheb | 750 | 1.11 | New |
| Margin of victory | | 18,232 | 26.96 | ▲19.30 |
| Turnout | | 68,746 | 63.10 | ▼1.63 |
| Total valid votes | | 67,625 | | |
| Registered electors | | 108,952 | | ▲10.65 |
| INC gain from INC(I) | | Swing | ▲22.80 | |

=== Assembly Election 1980 ===
1980 Maharashtra Legislative Assembly election : Akkalkot
| Party | Candidate | Votes | % | ±% |
|---|---|---|---|---|
| INC(I) | Malgonda Pawarti Gurningappa | 24,480 | 39.03 | ▲22.85 |
| BJP | Tanawade Babasaheb Sharannappa | 19,677 | 31.37 | New |
| JP | Patel Inayatalli Imamsaheb | 17,979 | 28.67 | ▼24.52 |
| Independent | Deshpande Madhavrao Raghunathrao | 582 | 0.93 | New |
| Margin of victory | | 4,803 | 7.66 | ▼15.86 |
| Turnout | | 64,386 | 65.39 | ▼8.26 |
| Total valid votes | | 62,718 | | |
| Registered electors | | 98,463 | | ▲6.74 |
| INC(I) gain from JP | | Swing | ▼14.16 | |

=== Assembly Election 1978 ===
1978 Maharashtra Legislative Assembly election : Akkalkot
| Party | Candidate | Votes | % | ±% |
|---|---|---|---|---|
| JP | Patel Inayatalli Imamsaheb | 35,305 | 53.19 | New |
| INC | Mane Baburao Tulshiram | 19,692 | 29.67 | ▼39.95 |
| INC(I) | Kesur Shivningappa Chandramappa | 10,740 | 16.18 | New |
| Independent | Kulkarni Vyanktesh Narsinh | 641 | 0.97 | New |
| Margin of victory | | 15,613 | 23.52 | ▼16.84 |
| Turnout | | 68,368 | 74.11 | ▲7.21 |
| Total valid votes | | 66,378 | | |
| Registered electors | | 92,246 | | ▲0.75 |
| JP gain from INC | | Swing | ▼16.43 | |

=== Assembly Election 1972 ===
1972 Maharashtra Legislative Assembly election : Akkalkot
| Party | Candidate | Votes | % | ±% |
|---|---|---|---|---|
| INC | Mane Baburao Tulshiram | 41,268 | 69.61 | ▲12.74 |
| RPI | Mulla Rajebhai Dadesaheb | 17,342 | 29.25 | New |
| Independent | Gokhale Keshav Damodhar | 672 | 1.13 | New |
| Margin of victory | | 23,926 | 40.36 | ▲18.06 |
| Turnout | | 61,086 | 66.72 | ▲0.85 |
| Total valid votes | | 59,282 | | |
| Registered electors | | 91,556 | | ▲11.41 |
| INC hold | | Swing | ▲12.74 | |

=== Assembly Election 1967 ===
1967 Maharashtra Legislative Assembly election : Akkalkot
| Party | Candidate | Votes | % | ±% |
|---|---|---|---|---|
| INC | Nirmalaraje Vijayasinh Bhosale | 29,868 | 56.87 | ▼20.94 |
| Independent | R. K. Magonda | 18,158 | 34.58 | New |
| Independent | K. M. Bekar | 2,704 | 5.15 | New |
| SWA | P . M. Shah | 1,077 | 2.05 | New |
| Independent | M. Y. Bansode | 709 | 1.35 | New |
| Margin of victory | | 11,710 | 22.30 | ▼37.54 |
| Turnout | | 55,501 | 67.54 | ▲9.92 |
| Total valid votes | | 52,516 | | |
| Registered electors | | 82,179 | | ▲26.49 |
| INC hold | | Swing | ▼20.94 | |

=== Assembly Election 1962 ===
1962 Maharashtra Legislative Assembly election : Akkalkot
| Party | Candidate | Votes | % | ±% |
|---|---|---|---|---|
| INC | Nirmalaraje Vijayasinh Bhosale | 27,291 | 77.82 | ▲30.47 |
| Independent | Shankareppa Basappa Lodapure | 6,306 | 17.98 | New |
| Independent | Yeshwant Ramchandra Birajdar | 1,473 | 4.20 | New |
| Margin of victory | | 20,985 | 59.84 | ▲48.50 |
| Turnout | | 36,952 | 56.88 | ▲5.17 |
| Total valid votes | | 35,070 | | |
| Registered electors | | 64,967 | | ▲6.82 |
| INC hold | | Swing | ▲30.47 | |

=== Assembly Election 1957 ===
1957 Bombay State Legislative Assembly election : Akkalkot
| Party | Candidate | Votes | % | ±% |
|---|---|---|---|---|
| INC | Chandele Chhanusing Kalyansing | 14,056 | 47.35 | New |
| Independent | Malagonda Ramchandra Kalappa | 10,690 | 36.01 | New |
| PSP | Malagonda Guruningappa Kashirya | 3,812 | 12.84 | New |
| Independent | Jangam Basalingaya Rachaya | 1,127 | 3.80 | New |
| Margin of victory | | 3,366 | 11.34 | |
| Turnout | | 29,685 | 48.81 | |
| Total valid votes | | 29,685 | | |
| Registered electors | | 60,818 | | |
| INC win (new seat) | | | | |
