= Sharad Bansode =

Indian politician

Member of Parliament, Lok Sabha
- In office 2014–2019
- Preceded by: Sushilkumar Shinde
- Succeeded by: Jaisidhesvar Swami
- Constituency: Solapur

Personal details
- Born: 14 April 1967 (age 58) Mangrul Akkalkot, Solapur district
- Political party: Bharatiya Janata Party
- Spouse: Varsha Bansode (m. 1996)
- Children: 2
- Parents: Maruti Bansode (father); Shakuntala Bansode (mother)
- Education: Bachelor of Science in Law
- Profession: Advocate; Film artist Politician

Sharad Bansode (b 14 April 1967 Mangrul, Akkalkot, Solapur district, Maharashtra) is an Indian politician from the Solapur district in Maharashtra state of India. He contested the 2009 Lok Sabha elections on the BJP ticket from Solapur.

He won the 2014 Lok sabha elections from Solapur (Lok Sabha constituency) as BJP /NDA candidate by around 1,50,000 votes and defeated sitting MP and Union Home Minister Sushil Kumar Shinde by getting 51,7879 votes against 36,8205.

== Positions held ==
- May, 2014 : Elected to 16th Lok Sabha
- 1 Sep. 2014 onwards : Member, Standing Committee on Personnel, Public Grievances, Law and Justice

Political offices
Preceded by Sushilkumar Shinde	Member of Parliament (Lok Sabha) from Solapur; 2014-2019	Succeeded by Incumbent
