= Pandharpur Assembly constituency =

Legislative assembly of Maharashtra state, India

Coordinates: 19.8382°N 75.2658°E

Pandharpur
- Constituency No. 252 for the Maharashtra Legislative Assembly

Constituency details
- Country: India
- Region: Western India
- State: Maharashtra
- District: Solapur
- Lok Sabha constituency: Solapur
- Established: 1957
- Total electors: 374,225
- Reservation: None

Member of Legislative Assembly
- 15th Maharashtra Legislative Assembly
- Incumbent Samadhan Autade
- Party: Bharatiya Janata Party
- Elected year: 2019

Pandharpur Assembly constituency is one of the 288 Vidhan Sabha (legislative assembly) constituencies of Maharashtra state, western India. This constituency is located in Solapur district. It is a segment of Solapur Lok Sabha constituency.

Two families, Paricharak and Bhalke, have been prominent in local politics since last 3-4 decades. Sudhakar Paricharak was elected five times, from 1985 to 2004. In 2009, NCP fielded Vijaysinh Mohite Patil but he lost to Bharat Bhalke. Then in 2014, Bhalake, by now in Congress, defeated Shailendra Paricharak. In 2019, Bhalke defeated Sudhakar Paricharak who had contested as BJP candidate. In August 2020, Sudhakar Paricharak died during Corona epidemic at the age of 84. In November 2020, sitting MLA Bhalke also died after contracting the novel coronavirus at the age of 60.

== Geographical scope ==
The constituency comprises Mangalvedha taluka, revenue circles Kasegaon and Pandharpur of Pandharpur taluka and Pandharpur Municipal Council.

== Members of the Legislative Assembly ==
Year	Member	Party
1957	Raghunath Namdeo Raul	Praja Socialist Party
1962	Audumbar Kondiba Patil	Indian National Congress
1967	Audumbar Kondiba Patil	Indian National Congress
1972	Audumbar Kondiba Patil	Indian National Congress
1978	Audumbar Kondiba Patil	Indian National Congress
1980	Pandurang Dingare	Indian National Congress (I)
1985	Sudhakar Ramchandra Paricharak	Indian National Congress
1990	Sudhakar Ramchandra Paricharak	Indian National Congress
1995	Sudhakar Ramchandra Paricharak	Indian National Congress
1999	Sudhakar Ramchandra Paricharak	Nationalist Congress Party
2004	Sudhakar Ramchandra Paricharak	Nationalist Congress Party
2009	Bharat Bhalke	Swabhimani Paksha
2014	Bharat Bhalke	Indian National Congress
2019	Bharat Bhalke	Nationalist Congress Party
2021^	Samadhan Autade	Bharatiya Janata Party
2024	Samadhan Autade	Bharatiya Janata Party

== Election results ==
=== Assembly Election 2024 ===
2024 Maharashtra Legislative Assembly election : Pandharpur
Party	Candidate	Votes	%	±%
BJP	Samadhan Mahadev Autade	125,163	47.82%	▼0.46
INC	Bhagirathdada Bharat Bhalke	116,733	44.60%	New
NCP-SP	Anil Subhash Sawant	10,217	3.90%	New
MNS	Dilip Kashinath Dhotre	2,568	0.98%	New
NOTA	None of the Above	638	0.24%	▼0.02
Margin of victory		8,430	3.22%	▲1.57
Turnout		262,362	70.11%	▲3.54
Total valid votes		261,724		
Registered electors		374,225		▲9.60
BJP hold		Swing	▼0.46	

=== Assembly By-election 2021 ===
2021 Maharashtra Legislative Assembly by-election : Pandharpur
Party	Candidate	Votes	%	±%
BJP	Samadhan Mahadev Autade	109,450	48.28%	▲16.29
NCP	Bhagirathdada Bharat Bhalke	105,717	46.63%	▲9.05
Independent	Sidheshwar Baban Autade	2,955	1.30%	New
BVA	Shaila Dhananjay Godase	1,607	0.71%	New
NOTA	None of the Above	599	0.26%	▼0.00
Margin of victory		3,733	1.65%	▼3.95
Turnout		224,090	65.63%	▼5.11
Total valid votes		226,707		
Registered electors		341,435		▲2.19
BJP gain from NCP		Swing	▲10.70	

=== Assembly Election 2019 ===
2019 Maharashtra Legislative Assembly election : Pandharpur
Party	Candidate	Votes	%	±%
NCP	Bharat Tukaram Bhalake	89,787	37.58%	▲36.23
BJP	Paricharak Sudhakar Ramchandra	76,426	31.99%	New
Independent	Samadhan Mahadeo Autade	54,124	22.65%	New
INC	Shivajirao Bajirao Kalunge	7,232	3.03%	▼37.19
Independent	Santosh Mahadev Mane	3,938	1.65%	New
VBA	Dattatraya Tatya Khadatare	1,862	0.78%	New
NOTA	None of the Above	639	0.27%	▼0.09
Margin of victory		13,361	5.59%	▲1.69
Turnout		239,691	71.74%	▼3.89
Total valid votes		238,919		
Registered electors		334,120		▲10.30
NCP gain from INC		Swing	▼2.64	

=== Assembly Election 2014 ===
2014 Maharashtra Legislative Assembly election : Pandharpur
Party	Candidate	Votes	%	±%
INC	Bharat Tukaram Bhalake	91,863	40.22%	New
SWP	Paricharak Shailendra Alias Prashant Prabhakar	82,950	36.32%	▼19.92
SS	Samadhan Mahadeo Autade	40,910	17.91%	▲16.15
NCP	Chandrakant Prabhakar Bagal	3,075	1.35%	▼35.10
NOTA	None of the Above	819	0.36%	New
Margin of victory		8,913	3.90%	▼15.90
Turnout		229,492	75.76%	▲6.65
Total valid votes		228,394		
Registered electors		302,914		▲10.34
INC gain from SWP		Swing	▼16.02	

=== Assembly Election 2009 ===
2009 Maharashtra Legislative Assembly election : Pandharpur
Party	Candidate	Votes	%	±%
SWP	Bharat Tukaram Bhalake	106,141	56.24%	New
NCP	Vijaysinh Shankarrao Mohite-Patil	68,778	36.44%	▼5.66
SS	Yetala Narayan Bhagat	3,330	1.76%	▼19.88
MNS	Dilip Kashinath Dhotre	1,998	1.06%	New
Independent	Patil Somnath Alias Raju Manohar	1,877	0.99%	New
Independent	Abhangrao Hemant Bhagwat	1,873	0.99%	New
JSS	Thengil Suryakant Dnyanoba	1,619	0.86%	New
Margin of victory		37,363	19.80%	▲7.78
Turnout		188,878	68.80%	▼10.95
Total valid votes		188,725		
Registered electors		274,527		▲8.95
SWP gain from NCP		Swing	▲14.14	

=== Assembly Election 2004 ===
2004 Maharashtra Legislative Assembly election : Pandharpur
Party	Candidate	Votes	%	±%
NCP	Sudhakar Ramchandra Paricharak	84,554	42.11%	▼10.85
Independent	Pandurang Yashwantrao Patil	60,415	30.08%	New
SS	Bharat Tukaram Bhalake	43,460	21.64%	New
Independent	Ramchandra Ganpat Shinde	3,228	1.61%	New
BSP	Anil Raosaheb Chavan	2,186	1.09%	New
Independent	Mukund Pandurang Adhatrao	2,043	1.02%	New
Independent	Abdulrauf Jafar Mulani	1,507	0.75%	New
Margin of victory		24,139	12.02%	▲2.28
Turnout		200,904	79.73%	▲4.63
Total valid votes		200,815		
Registered electors		251,981		▲19.89
NCP hold		Swing	▼10.85	

=== Assembly Election 1999 ===
1999 Maharashtra Legislative Assembly election : Pandharpur
Party	Candidate	Votes	%	±%
NCP	Sudhakar Ramchandra Paricharak	83,559	52.96%	New
Independent	Kale Vasantrao Shrimant	68,196	43.22%	New
INC	Bagal Bajrang Sambhaji	6,023	3.82%	▼43.56
Margin of victory		15,363	9.74%	▲6.09
Turnout		167,208	79.56%	▼9.19
Total valid votes		157,778		
Registered electors		210,179		▲4.77
NCP gain from INC		Swing	▲5.58	

=== Assembly Election 1995 ===
1995 Maharashtra Legislative Assembly election : Pandharpur
Party	Candidate	Votes	%	±%
INC	Sudhakar Ramchandra Paricharak	80,084	47.38%	▼29.56
Independent	Patil Rajaram Audumbar	73,914	43.73%	New
SS	Bhosale Dattatraya Baburao	12,893	7.63%	▼0.30
Margin of victory		6,170	3.65%	▼64.91
Turnout		172,229	85.85%	▲20.39
Total valid votes		169,035		
Registered electors		200,618		▲10.02
INC hold		Swing	▼29.56	

=== Assembly Election 1990 ===
1990 Maharashtra Legislative Assembly election : Pandharpur
Party	Candidate	Votes	%	±%
INC	Sudhakar Ramchandra Paricharak	89,597	76.94%	▲21.44
JD	Patil Prakash Bhivaji	9,751	8.37%	New
SS	Mane Jayawant Mohan	9,228	7.92%	New
Independent	Dombe Balasaheb Shivling	6,720	5.77%	New
Margin of victory		79,846	68.56%	▲56.11
Turnout		118,476	64.97%	▼12.02
Total valid votes		116,455		
Registered electors		182,353		▲26.26
INC hold		Swing	▲21.44	

=== Assembly Election 1985 ===
1985 Maharashtra Legislative Assembly election : Pandharpur
Party	Candidate	Votes	%	±%
INC	Sudhakar Ramchandra Paricharak	60,817	55.50%	New
IC(S)	Yeshawantrao Gopalrao Patil	47,173	43.05%	New
Independent	Mulani Mubarak Ibrahim	843	0.77%	New
Margin of victory		13,644	12.45%	▲8.34
Turnout		111,449	77.17%	▲12.15
Total valid votes		109,586		
Registered electors		144,425		▲18.15
INC gain from INC(I)		Swing	▲3.89	

=== Assembly Election 1980 ===
1980 Maharashtra Legislative Assembly election : Pandharpur
Party	Candidate	Votes	%	±%
INC(I)	Dingare Pandurang Bhanudas	40,198	51.60%	▲49.79
INC(U)	Patil Audumbar Kondiba	36,999	47.50%	New
Margin of victory		3,199	4.11%	▼0.52
Turnout		79,641	65.15%	▼10.05
Total valid votes		77,900		
Registered electors		122,242		▲13.90
INC(I) gain from INC		Swing	▲2.08	

=== Assembly Election 1978 ===
1978 Maharashtra Legislative Assembly election : Pandharpur
Party	Candidate	Votes	%	±%
INC	Audumber Kondiba Patil	39,205	49.52%	▼14.46
JP	Paricharak Sudhakar Ramchandra	35,543	44.89%	New
PWPI	Sagar Sarjerao Kondiba	1,536	1.94%	New
INC(I)	Bagal Bajarang Sambhaji	1,434	1.81%	New
Independent	Dombe Bal Shivling	764	0.96%	New
Independent	Bhosale Digamber Maruti	690	0.87%	New
Margin of victory		3,662	4.63%	▼31.62
Turnout		81,344	75.80%	▲17.13
Total valid votes		79,172		
Registered electors		107,320		▲13.02
INC hold		Swing	▼14.46	

=== Assembly Election 1972 ===
1972 Maharashtra Legislative Assembly election : Pandharpur
Party	Candidate	Votes	%	±%
INC	Audumber Kondiba Patil	34,412	63.98%	▲11.58
Independent	Dombe Balu Shivling	14,915	27.73%	New
RPI	Nanvare Mahadeo Keru	2,350	4.37%	New
RPI(K)	S. Sidhanath Nivarti	1,955	3.63%	New
Margin of victory		19,497	36.25%	▲12.88
Turnout		55,610	58.57%	▼1.09
Total valid votes		53,785		
Registered electors		94,953		▲9.07
INC hold		Swing	▲11.58	

=== Assembly Election 1967 ===
1967 Maharashtra Legislative Assembly election : Pandharpur
Party	Candidate	Votes	%	±%
INC	Audumber Kondiba Patil	26,336	52.40%	▼6.94
Independent	J. G. More	14,591	29.03%	New
Independent	R. V. Gurjar	9,329	18.56%	New
Margin of victory		11,745	23.37%	▼8.08
Turnout		55,568	63.83%	▼3.40
Total valid votes		50,256		
Registered electors		87,055		▲11.80
INC hold		Swing	▼6.94	

=== Assembly Election 1962 ===
1962 Maharashtra Legislative Assembly election : Pandharpur
Party	Candidate	Votes	%	±%
INC	Audumber Kondiba Patil	28,246	59.34%	▲18.14
Independent	Jayawant Ghanashyam More	13,275	27.89%	New
ABHM	Vasant Babaji Badeve	2,710	5.69%	New
ABJS	Bhalchandra Dattatraya Nadgauda	2,114	4.44%	New
Independent	Shaikh Imam Mohammed	1,114	2.34%	New
Margin of victory		14,971	31.45%	▲23.40
Turnout		50,580	64.96%	▼0.71
Total valid votes		47,599		
Registered electors		77,867		▲20.05
INC gain from PSP		Swing	▲10.09	

=== Assembly Election 1957 ===
1957 Bombay State Legislative Assembly election : Pandharpur
Party	Candidate	Votes	%	±%
PSP	Raul Raghunath Namdeo	19,755	49.25%	New
INC	Gurjar Raghunath Vishnu	16,526	41.20%	New
Independent	Patil Annarao Ramchandra	3,830	9.55%	New
Margin of victory		3,229	8.05%	New
Turnout		40,111	61.84%	New
Total valid votes		40,111		
Registered electors		64,861		New
PSP gain from Independent		Swing		
