= Solapur City North Assembly constituency =

Constituency of the Maharashtra legislative assembly in India

Coordinates: 17.69°N 75.92°E

Solapur City North
- Constituency No. 248 for the Maharashtra Legislative Assembly

Constituency details
- Country: India
- Region: Western India
- State: Maharashtra
- Division: Pune division
- District: Solapur
- Lok Sabha constituency: Solapur
- Established: 1951
- Total electors: 328,653
- Reservation: None

Member of Legislative Assembly
- 15th Maharashtra Legislative Assembly
- Incumbent Vijay Sidramappa Deshmukh
- Party: Bharatiya Janata Party
- Alliance: Maha Yuti
- Elected year: 2024
- Preceded by: Vishwanath Chakote

Solapur City North Assembly constituency (formerly Sholapur) is one of the 288 Vidhan Sabha (legislative assembly) constituencies of Maharashtra state, western India. This constituency is located in Solapur district.

== Geographical scope ==
The constituency comprises ward nos. 1 to 5, 15 to 28, 48 to 49, 52 to 65, 86 to 88 of Solapur Municipal Corporation and Solapur revenue circle.

Polling booth station areas under constituency

Polling Booth Areas
Bidi Gharkul / Vidi Gharkul
West Mangalavar Peth
Patra Talim
Hande Plot
Damani Nagar
Jodabhavi Peth
Shukravar Peth
Tulajapur Ves
Chaupad
Budhavar Peth Milind Nagar
Balives
Bhavani Peth Hanuman Nagar
Kasabe Solapur Karamba
Bhavani Peth
Shivaji Nagar (keganv )
Kegav
Budhavar Peth
Kondi
Rangraj Nagar
Shelagi
Kondi
Datta chowk area
Ghongade Vasti
Sakhar Peth
Murarji Peth
Shelagi
Bhavani Peth Maddi Patil Vasti
Ravivar Peth
Laxmi Peth Hause Vasti
Rupabhavani
Daji Peth
Sarvodya Nagar
Market Yard
Gandhi Nagar Zopadpatti Nan2
Laxmi Peth
Laxmi Peth Habbuvasti
Laxmi Peth Thobade Vasti
Dhor Gali

== Members of the Legislative Assembly ==
| Election | Member | Party |
|---|---|---|
| 1952 | Shivshakar Mallappa Dhanshetty | Peasants and Workers Party of India |
| 1957 | Keshavlal Veerchand Shah | Indian National Congress |
| 1962 | Yankapa Ramaya Madur | Communist Party of India |
| 1967 | Ramkrishna Pant Bet | Indian National Congress |
| 1972 | Ramkrishna Pant Bet | Indian National Congress |
| 1978 | Adam Narsayya Narayan | Communist Party of India |
| 1980 | Baburao Channappa Chakote | Indian National Congress |
| 1985 | Baburao Channappa Chakote | Indian National Congress |
| 1990 | Lingaraj Valyal | Bharatiya Janata Party |
| 1995 | Lingaraj Valyal | Bharatiya Janata Party |
| 1996 By-election | Narsing Madhavrao Mengaji | Bharatiya Janata Party |
| 1999 | Vishwanath Baburao Chakote | Indian National Congress |
| 2004 | Vijay Siddramappa Deshmukh | Bharatiya Janata Party |
| 2009 | Vijay Siddramappa Deshmukh | Bharatiya Janata Party |
| 2014 | Vijay Siddramappa Deshmukh | Bharatiya Janata Party |
| 2019 | Vijay Siddramappa Deshmukh | Bharatiya Janata Party |
| 2024 | Vijay Siddramappa Deshmukh | Bharatiya Janata Party |

== Election results ==
=== Assembly Election 2024 ===
2024 Maharashtra Legislative Assembly election : Solapur City North
| Party | Candidate | Votes | % | ±% |
|---|---|---|---|---|
| BJP | Vijay Siddramappa Deshmukh | 117,215 | 61.12 | ▼3.44 |
| NCP-SP | Kothe Mahesh Vishnupant | 62,632 | 32.66 | New |
| VBA | Vikrant Shrikant Gaikwad | 2,477 | 1.29 | ▼14.40 |
| BCP | Juber Salim Patel | 1,885 | 0.98 | New |
| Independent | Mosin Gulab Bagwan (Maindargikar) | 1,693 | 0.88 | New |
| BSP | Shilwant Tatyarao Kale | 1,547 | 0.81 | ▲0.06 |
| NOTA | None of the above | 716 | 0.37 | ▼1.07 |
| Margin of victory | | 54,583 | 28.46 | ▼20.41 |
| Turnout | | 192,503 | 58.57 | ▲5.93 |
| Total valid votes | | 191,787 | | |
| Registered electors | | 328,653 | | ▲13.93 |
| BJP hold | | Swing | ▼3.44 | |

=== Assembly Election 2019 ===
2019 Maharashtra Legislative Assembly election : Solapur City North
| Party | Candidate | Votes | % | ±% |
|---|---|---|---|---|
| BJP | Vijay Siddramappa Deshmukh | 96,529 | 64.56 | ▲7.49 |
| VBA | Anand Baburao Chandanshive | 23,461 | 15.69 | New |
| NCP | Manohar Ganpat Sapate | 19,205 | 12.84 | ▲1.02 |
| AIMIM | Bansode Atish Mohan | 5,386 | 3.60 | ▼4.52 |
| NOTA | None of the above | 2,153 | 1.44 | ▲0.83 |
| BSP | Namdeo Tukaram Raste | 1,122 | 0.75 | ▼4.43 |
| SBP | Raut Somnath Vijay | 1,058 | 0.71 | New |
| Margin of victory | | 73,068 | 48.87 | ▲3.62 |
| Turnout | | 151,837 | 52.64 | ▼4.09 |
| Total valid votes | | 149,520 | | |
| Registered electors | | 288,466 | | ▲6.23 |
| BJP hold | | Swing | ▲7.49 | |

=== Assembly Election 2014 ===
2014 Maharashtra Legislative Assembly election : Solapur City North
| Party | Candidate | Votes | % | ±% |
|---|---|---|---|---|
| BJP | Vijay Sidramappa Deshmukh | 86,877 | 57.07 | ▲11.47 |
| NCP | Mahesh Chandrakant Gadekar | 17,999 | 11.82 | New |
| INC | Chakote Vishwanath Baburao | 14,456 | 9.50 | ▼28.72 |
| AIMIM | Vishnupant L. Gavade | 12,358 | 8.12 | New |
| SS | Khandare Uttamprakash Baburao | 9,028 | 5.93 | New |
| BSP | Ashok Pandhari Janrao | 7,881 | 5.18 | ▲1.69 |
| NOTA | None of the above | 928 | 0.61 | New |
| Margin of victory | | 68,878 | 45.25 | ▲37.87 |
| Turnout | | 154,052 | 56.73 | ▲5.51 |
| Total valid votes | | 152,223 | | |
| Registered electors | | 271,536 | | ▲1.65 |
| BJP hold | | Swing | ▲11.47 | |

=== Assembly Election 2009 ===
2009 Maharashtra Legislative Assembly election : Solapur City North
| Party | Candidate | Votes | % | ±% |
|---|---|---|---|---|
| BJP | Vijay Siddramappa Deshmukh | 62,363 | 45.60 | ▼5.51 |
| INC | Kothe Mahesh Vishnupant | 52,273 | 38.22 | ▼1.51 |
| Independent | Sapate Manohar Ganpat | 14,624 | 10.69 | New |
| BSP | Jain Manoj Sumerchand | 4,770 | 3.49 | ▼1.54 |
| Republican Party of India (Democratic) | Ram Vaman Sarvade | 843 | 0.62 | New |
| Margin of victory | | 10,090 | 7.38 | ▼4.00 |
| Turnout | | 136,821 | 51.22 | ▼7.57 |
| Total valid votes | | 136,763 | | |
| Registered electors | | 267,133 | | ▲145.65 |
| BJP hold | | Swing | ▼5.51 | |

=== Assembly Election 2004 ===
2004 Maharashtra Legislative Assembly election : Solapur City North
| Party | Candidate | Votes | % | ±% |
|---|---|---|---|---|
| BJP | Vijay Siddramappa Deshmukh | 32,665 | 51.11 | ▲11.42 |
| INC | Chakote Vishwanath Baburao | 25,392 | 39.73 | ▼4.38 |
| BSP | Mangodekar Tulajarm Shetiba | 3,216 | 5.03 | New |
| Independent | Mengaji Narsing Madhavrao | 1,451 | 2.27 | New |
| Independent | Sayyad Mohammand Sadik Mahiboobso | 480 | 0.75 | New |
| Margin of victory | | 7,273 | 11.38 | ▲6.95 |
| Turnout | | 63,927 | 58.79 | ▼2.13 |
| Total valid votes | | 63,914 | | |
| Registered electors | | 108,747 | | ▼2.63 |
| BJP gain from INC | | Swing | ▲7.00 | |

=== Assembly Election 1999 ===
1999 Maharashtra Legislative Assembly election : Solapur City North
| Party | Candidate | Votes | % | ±% |
|---|---|---|---|---|
| INC | Chakote Vishwanath Baburao | 29,167 | 44.11 | ▲7.43 |
| BJP | Kishor A. Deshpande | 26,240 | 39.69 | ▼14.04 |
| NCP | Sadul Dharmanna Mondayya | 10,577 | 16.00 | New |
| Margin of victory | | 2,927 | 4.43 | ▼12.61 |
| Turnout | | 68,036 | 60.92 | ▼0.08 |
| Total valid votes | | 66,120 | | |
| Registered electors | | 111,682 | | ▲3.40 |
| INC gain from BJP | | Swing | ▼9.62 | |

=== Assembly By-election 1996 ===
1996 Maharashtra Legislative Assembly by-election : Solapur City North
| Party | Candidate | Votes | % | ±% |
|---|---|---|---|---|
| BJP | Mengaji Narsing Madhavrao | 35,126 | 53.73 | ▲7.94 |
| INC | Chakote Vishwanath Baburao | 23,982 | 36.68 | ▲10.17 |
| CPI(M) | Kalshetti Siddhappa Shivbasappa | 5,601 | 8.57 | New |
| BSP | Sagari Moulasab Jamalsab | 533 | 0.82 | ▲0.39 |
| Margin of victory | | 11,144 | 17.04 | ▼2.25 |
| Turnout | | 65,880 | 61.00 | ▼14.08 |
| Total valid votes | | 65,380 | | |
| Registered electors | | 108,006 | | ▲1.30 |
| BJP hold | | Swing | ▲7.94 | |

=== Assembly Election 1995 ===
1995 Maharashtra Legislative Assembly election : Solapur City North
| Party | Candidate | Votes | % | ±% |
|---|---|---|---|---|
| BJP | Lingaraj Valyal | 36,077 | 45.79 | ▼8.44 |
| INC | Abdulpurkar Aralappa Gangappa | 20,883 | 26.51 | ▼14.91 |
| Independent | Chakote Baburao Channappa | 14,772 | 18.75 | New |
| Independent | Marta Prakash Mallayya | 2,452 | 3.11 | New |
| Independent | Kureshi A. Khalif Haji A. Ajij | 842 | 1.07 | New |
| JD | Shetty Saraswati Shankar | 548 | 0.70 | ▼1.87 |
| Margin of victory | | 15,194 | 19.29 | ▲6.49 |
| Turnout | | 80,049 | 75.08 | ▲8.56 |
| Total valid votes | | 78,786 | | |
| Registered electors | | 106,616 | | ▼9.43 |
| BJP hold | | Swing | ▼8.44 | |

=== Assembly Election 1990 ===
1990 Maharashtra Legislative Assembly election : Solapur City North
| Party | Candidate | Votes | % | ±% |
|---|---|---|---|---|
| BJP | Lingaraj Valyal | 42,059 | 54.23 | ▲19.10 |
| INC | Chakote Baburao Channappa | 32,128 | 41.42 | ▼16.43 |
| JD | Kanna Umesh Vishwambar | 1,995 | 2.57 | New |
| Margin of victory | | 9,931 | 12.80 | ▼9.92 |
| Turnout | | 78,297 | 66.52 | ▲1.00 |
| Total valid votes | | 77,563 | | |
| Registered electors | | 117,712 | | ▲15.05 |
| BJP gain from INC | | Swing | ▼3.62 | |

=== Assembly Election 1985 ===
1985 Maharashtra Legislative Assembly election : Solapur City North
| Party | Candidate | Votes | % | ±% |
|---|---|---|---|---|
| INC | Chakote Baburao Channappa | 38,370 | 57.85 | New |
| BJP | Raleraskar Ravindra Ramkrishna | 23,302 | 35.13 | ▲29.01 |
| Independent | Parakipandala Narsayya Lachhamaya | 4,652 | 7.01 | New |
| Margin of victory | | 15,068 | 22.72 | ▲22.56 |
| Turnout | | 67,043 | 65.52 | ▲0.31 |
| Total valid votes | | 66,324 | | |
| Registered electors | | 102,317 | | ▲2.33 |
| INC gain from INC(U) | | Swing | ▲17.62 | |

=== Assembly Election 1980 ===
1980 Maharashtra Legislative Assembly election : Solapur City North
| Party | Candidate | Votes | % | ±% |
|---|---|---|---|---|
| INC(U) | Chakote Baburao Channappa | 25,870 | 40.23 | New |
| INC(I) | Dikonda Vithalrao Sayanna | 25,769 | 40.07 | ▲13.78 |
| BJP | Iqbal Rayalliwala | 3,933 | 6.12 | New |
| Independent | Adam Narsayya Narayan | 3,647 | 5.67 | New |
| CPI | Indapure Chintamani Dattatraya | 2,073 | 3.22 | New |
| JP | Gentyal Narasappa Bhimayya | 1,958 | 3.04 | New |
| Independent | Patil Vishnupanth Ramrao | 916 | 1.42 | New |
| Margin of victory | | 101 | 0.16 | ▼4.83 |
| Turnout | | 65,207 | 65.21 | ▼2.97 |
| Total valid votes | | 64,311 | | |
| Registered electors | | 99,988 | | ▲2.88 |
| INC(U) gain from CPI(M) | | Swing | ▲8.95 | |

=== Assembly Election 1978 ===
1978 Maharashtra Legislative Assembly election : Solapur City North
| Party | Candidate | Votes | % | ±% |
|---|---|---|---|---|
| CPI(M) | Adam Narsayya Narayan | 20,372 | 31.28 | ▲29.09 |
| INC(I) | Dikonda Vithalrao Sayanna | 17,123 | 26.29 | New |
| Independent | Bali Ganesh Rachappa | 14,354 | 22.04 | New |
| INC | Bhogade Vishvanath Sidramappa | 9,281 | 14.25 | ▼33.33 |
| Independent | Rampure Abdal Ajit Nabilal | 2,598 | 3.99 | New |
| ABHM | Patil Vishnupant Ramrao | 874 | 1.34 | New |
| Independent | Ohol Ganpat Bhagwan | 406 | 0.62 | New |
| Margin of victory | | 3,249 | 4.99 | ▼2.63 |
| Turnout | | 66,263 | 68.18 | ▼1.97 |
| Total valid votes | | 65,123 | | |
| Registered electors | | 97,185 | | ▲25.25 |
| CPI(M) gain from INC | | Swing | ▼16.30 | |

=== Assembly Election 1972 ===
1972 Maharashtra Legislative Assembly election : Solapur City North
| Party | Candidate | Votes | % | ±% |
|---|---|---|---|---|
| INC | Ramkrishna Pant Bet | 25,364 | 47.58 | ▲7.09 |
| CPI | Madur Venkappa Ramayya | 21,301 | 39.96 | ▲5.77 |
| ABJS | Revansidha Bhogade | 5,473 | 10.27 | ▲7.60 |
| CPI(M) | Adam Narsayya Narayan | 1,170 | 2.19 | New |
| Margin of victory | | 4,063 | 7.62 | ▲1.32 |
| Turnout | | 54,427 | 70.15 | ▼1.74 |
| Total valid votes | | 53,308 | | |
| Registered electors | | 77,591 | | ▲14.26 |
| INC hold | | Swing | ▲7.09 | |

=== Assembly Election 1967 ===
1967 Maharashtra Legislative Assembly election : Solapur City North
| Party | Candidate | Votes | % | ±% |
|---|---|---|---|---|
| INC | Ramkrishna Pant Bet | 18,722 | 40.49 | ▲1.40 |
| CPI | V. R. Madur | 15,809 | 34.19 | ▼10.14 |
| SWA | C. M. Warad | 8,769 | 18.96 | New |
| Independent | M. R. Bumal | 1,593 | 3.44 | New |
| ABJS | G. B. Hampi | 1,235 | 2.67 | New |
| Margin of victory | | 2,913 | 6.30 | ▲1.05 |
| Turnout | | 48,816 | 71.89 | ▲8.74 |
| Total valid votes | | 46,244 | | |
| Registered electors | | 67,905 | | ▼24.16 |
| INC gain from CPI | | Swing | ▼3.84 | |

=== Assembly Election 1962 ===
1962 Maharashtra Legislative Assembly election : Solapur City North
| Party | Candidate | Votes | % | ±% |
|---|---|---|---|---|
| CPI | Yankapa Ramaya Madur | 23,025 | 44.33 | New |
| INC | Keshavlal Virchand Shah | 20,301 | 39.09 | ▼17.45 |
| ABJS | Hanmantraya Irappa Racheti | 6,822 | 13.14 | New |
| Independent | Sidram Mallayya Kantikar | 1,241 | 2.39 | New |
| Independent | Sidramappa Maruti Fulari | 546 | 1.05 | New |
| Margin of victory | | 2,724 | 5.25 | ▼26.39 |
| Turnout | | 56,541 | 63.15 | ▲2.21 |
| Total valid votes | | 51,935 | | |
| Registered electors | | 89,540 | | ▲25.91 |
| CPI gain from INC | | Swing | ▼12.21 | |

=== Assembly Election 1957 ===
1957 Bombay State Legislative Assembly election : Solapur City North
| Party | Candidate | Votes | % | ±% |
|---|---|---|---|---|
| INC | Shah Keshavlal Veerchand | 24,503 | 56.54 | ▲17.73 |
| Independent | Irabatti Ashanna Lachamaya | 10,791 | 24.90 | New |
| SCF | Abute Laxman Narasu | 8,042 | 18.56 | New |
| Margin of victory | | 13,712 | 31.64 | ▲18.04 |
| Turnout | | 43,336 | 60.94 | ▲13.55 |
| Total valid votes | | 43,336 | | |
| Registered electors | | 71,115 | | ▲49.71 |
| INC gain from PWPI | | Swing | ▲4.13 | |

=== Assembly Election 1952 ===
1952 Bombay State Legislative Assembly election : Solapur City North
| Party | Candidate | Votes | % | ±% |
|---|---|---|---|---|
| PWPI | Dhanshetti Shivshakar Mallappa | 11,799 | 52.41 | New |
| INC | Chanapattan Vyankappa Tippanna | 8,737 | 38.81 | New |
| Independent | Sardar Madiwallappa Shivshankar | 527 | 2.34 | New |
| Independent | Bableshwar Hajisaheb Amirsaheb | 381 | 1.69 | New |
| RRP | Oname Annarao Revanshiddappa | 357 | 1.59 | New |
| Independent | Kankatti Papayya Ushappa | 298 | 1.32 | New |
| Independent | Sheral Narsappa Lachmaya | 221 | 0.98 | New |
| Independent | Bet Ramkrishna Vyankappa | 192 | 0.85 | New |
| Margin of victory | | 3,062 | 13.60 | |
| Turnout | | 22,512 | 47.39 | |
| Total valid votes | | 22,512 | | |
| Registered electors | | 47,501 | | |
| PWPI win (new seat) | | | | |
