= Jaisidhesvar Swami =

Indian politician

Dr Jaisiddeshwar Shivacharya Mahaswamiji

Member of the Parliament for Solapur
- In office 2019–2024
- Preceded by: Sharad Bansode
- Succeeded by: Praniti Shinde
- Constituency: Solapur

Personal details
- Born: 01/06/1960 Valsang
- Party: Bharatiya Janata Party
- Parent(s): Gurubasayya Hiremath & Rudramma Hiremath
- Education: Banaras Hindu University
- Occupation: Social Worker

Dr Jaisiddeshwar Shivacharya Mahaswamiji is an Indian politician and a member of parliament to the 17th Lok Sabha from Solapur Lok Sabha constituency, Maharashtra.He won the 2019 Indian general election being a Bharatiya Janata Party candidate.
