= Lingaraj Valyal =

Indian politician

Member of Parliament, Lok Sabha
- In office 1996–1998
- Preceded by: Dharmanna Sadul
- Succeeded by: Sushil Kumar Shinde
- Constituency: Solapur

Member of Maharashtra Legislative Assembly
- In office 1990–1996
- Preceded by: Baburao Chakote
- Succeeded by: Vishwanath Chakote
- Constituency: Solapur City North

Personal details
- Born: 24 June 1950 (age 74); Nanded, Hyderabad state (now Maharashtra)
- Political party: Bharatiya Janata Party
- Spouse: Lalitha (m. 1970)
- Children: 2 sons, 1 daughter
- Parent: Balairayya Valyal (father)
- Education: Bachelor of Commerce

Lingaraj Valyal is an Indian politician from the Bharatiya Janata Party, Maharashtra who served as Lok Sabha member from Solapur from 1996 to 1998. He had also represented Solapur City North from 1990 to 1996.
