= Bharat Bhalke =

Indian politician (1960–2020)

Member of Maharashtra Legislative Assembly
- In office 13 October 2009 – 28 November 2020
- Preceded by: Vijaysinh Mohite–Patil
- Succeeded by: Samadhan Autade
- Constituency: Pandharpur Assembly constituency

Personal details
- Born: 28 November 1960
- Died: 28 November 2020 (aged 60) Pandharpur
- Party: Nationalist Congress Party
- Children: 4
- Occupation: Politician

Bharat Nana Bhalke (28 November 1960 – 28 November 2020) was an Indian politician and member of the Nationalist Congress Party.

Bhalke served as a MLA from 2009 for Pandharpur, where he defeated Vijaysinh Mohite–Patil, until his death from post-COVID-19 complications in 2020 during the COVID-19 pandemic in India.
