= Shikhar Pahariya =

Indian industrialist, philanthropist and equestrian

- Born: 3 April 1997 (age 29); Mumbai, Maharashtra, India
- Education: Regent's University London
- Occupations: Industrialist; Philanthropist; Polo Player
- Organisations: Basilius International; Veera Foundation; Indiawyn Gaming
- Parents: Sanjay Pahariya (father); Smruti Shinde (mother)
- Relatives: Sushilkumar Shinde (maternal grandfather); Veer Pahariya (brother); Praniti Shinde (maternal aunt)

Shikhar Pahariya (born 3 April 1997) is an Indian industrialist and polo player. He is associated with ventures in gaming and infrastructure. He is the grandson of Sushilkumar Shinde, former Union Home Minister of India, Chief Minister of Maharashtra, and senior leader of the Indian National Congress. He has represented India in international polo tournaments, including matches in the United Kingdom where India secured notable wins.

== Early life and education ==
Pahariya was born in Mumbai in 1997 to Smruti Shinde, a film producer, and Sanjay Pahariya, a businessman. His elder brother, Veer Pahariya, is a Bollywood actor. He attended Bombay Scottish School and Dhirubhai Ambani International School in Mumbai before pursuing a degree in Global Financial Management at Regent's University London.

== Career ==
Pahariya's entrepreneurial journey began at the age of 13 when he, alongside his brother Veer Pahariya, established a consultancy firm to assist first-time pet owners.. After completing his degree, Pahariya worked as an investment analyst in London. In 2018, he co-founded Indiawyn Gaming. The company launched Jeetoh, which was described by Mint as one of the country’s early live-interaction gaming platforms..

Pahariya later established Basilius International, an infrastructure development company with operations spanning energy and aviation. The firm has undertaken projects in Maharashtra, Gujarat, Goa, Uttar Pradesh and internationally in the United Arab Emirates, Oman and the United Kingdom. Its portfolio includes large-scale community infrastructure and commercial projects.

== Social work and philanthropy ==
Pahariya is actively engaged in philanthropic activities, with a focus on women’s empowerment and youth development. He has collaborated with NGOs on environmental programs and sports-related initiatives.. He is the founder of the Veera Foundation, a non-profit initiative that has been noted by Feminism in India for its work with men and boys on gender issues. According to the organisation’s website, the foundation focuses on workshops and dialogue programmes around positive masculinity and male allyship.

In Solapur, Maharashtra, during the COVID-19 pandemic, Pahariya arranged ration kits for several thousand families over a six-month period. He has organized water tankers during severe droughts in the region, and in 2024 convened a job fair that drew over 3,000 participants, connecting local youth to employment opportunities. He also donates amenities to educational facilities and books to village library initiatives across Western Maharashtra.

== Polo ==
A trained polo player, Pahariya has competed in polo and show-jumping events in India and abroad. He has represented India at the Royal County of Berkshire Polo Club in London, where the team recorded victories against international sides. In 2013, he was part of the Jaipur Polo Team that won the 7th Asia Polo Cup in Windsor, defeating the English team 5–4 to secure the trophy for the first time.

== Personal life ==
Pahariya has received media coverage for his family background and for his association with actress Janhvi Kapoor. He lives in Mumbai.

== Controversies ==
In March 2025, Pahariya drew attention for publicly responding to a caste-based remark directed at him on social media, criticising the troll’s "small, backward mindset" and emphasising India's strength in diversity and inclusivity.

In May 2025, Pahariya faced backlash on social media after posting in support of the Indian Armed Forces following Operation Sindoor. Some users criticised him as “heartless” for not addressing civilian concerns, while others trolled him for his remarks. Pahariya defended his stance by calling the Pahalgam attack a "hate-fueled massacre" and stressing the need for respect for armed forces and national solidarity.

In July 2025, Pahariya commented on Maharashtra’s Marathi–Hindi language row surrounding the Three Language Policy, where he argued that cultural pride should "uplift, not divide," and that fear alone cannot sustain a language. He supported the Marathi asmita, but stressed that it should not come at the expense of others. The remarks sparked widespread media coverage and drew strong criticism from local Marathi outfits.
