= Solapur South Assembly constituency =

Constituency of the Maharashtra legislative assembly in India

Coordinates: 17.63°N 75.91°E

Solapur South
- Constituency No. 251 for the Maharashtra Legislative Assembly
- Subhash Deshmukh, present MLA of Solapur south

Constituency details
- Country: India
- Region: Western India
- State: Maharashtra
- Division: Pune division
- District: Solapur
- Lok Sabha constituency: Solapur
- Established: 1955
- Total electors: 382,994
- Reservation: None

Member of Legislative Assembly
- 15th Maharashtra Legislative Assembly
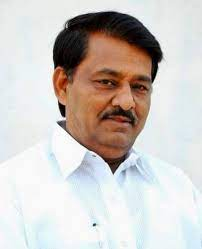
- Incumbent Subhash Sureshchandra Deshmukh
- Party: BJP
- Alliance: Maha Yuti
- Elected year: 2024
- Preceded by: Dilip Mane

Solapur South Assembly constituency (formerly South Solapur) is one of the 288 Vidhan Sabha (legislative assembly) constituencies of Maharashtra state, western India. This constituency is located in Solapur district.

== Geographical scope ==
The constituency comprises Tirhe, Shelga revenue circles in Solapur North taluka, ward nos 7 to 14 and 40 - 43 of Solapur Municipal Corporation and Hotgi, Mandrup and Vinchur revenue circles of Solapur South taluka.

Polling booth station areas under constituency

Polling Booth Areas
Ambedkar Nagar
Utkarsh Nagar
Shanti Nagar Majarevadi
Soreganv Gaonthan
Jule Solapur
Vadakabal
Hattur
Nai Jindagi Majarevadi
Degav Gaonthan
Kumathe Gaonthan
Majarevadi Gaonthan Hotgi Road
Hatture Vasti Hotagi Road
Sundaram Nagar
Swagat Nagar
Mandrup
Aheravadi
Dongaon
Barur
Pakani
Neelam Nagar Juna Kumbhari Road
Kandalaganv
Vijapur Road
Utkarsh Nagar
Majarevadi
Adarsh Nagar
Nehru Nagar
S. R. P Camp
Vijapur Road
Kandalagaon
Kusur
Mangoli
Jule Solapur
Ambedkar Nagar Hotgi Road
Pratap Nagar Gaonthan
Soreganv Gaonthan
Majarevadi Gaonthan Hotgi Road
Nehru Nagar
Honmurgi
Shivashahi Javal Kumathe
Bharat Mata Nagar, Hotgi Road
Mandrup
Malakavathe
Mandrup
Shanti Nagar Majarevadi
Bhandarakavathe
Pakani
Aherwadi
Akole Mandrup
Antroli
Auj Mandrup
Aurad
Balgi
Bankalagi
Barur
Basav Nagar
Belati
Bolkavathe
Borul
Chinchpur
Fatatewadi
Gavadewadi
Ghodatanda
Gunjegaon
Hattarsang
Hattur
Hipale
Hiraj
Hotgi
Indira Nagar
Ingalgi
Karkal
Kawathe
Khanapur
Kudal
Kulkarni Tanda
Kumte
Kurghot
Kusur
Lavangi
Majrewadi
Malkavathe
Mangoli
Nandani
Nandur
Nimbargi
Pathari
Rajur
Rana Pratap Nagar
Sadepur
Salgar Vasti
Samshapur
Sanjwad
Savatkhed
Shankar Nagar
Shirval
Shivganga Nagar
Shivani
Sindkhed
Soregaon
Sundram Nagar
Tai Chowk
Takali
Telgaon
Tirhe
Vadakbal
Vadapur
Vangi
Vinayak Nagar
Vinchur
Yelegaon
Yetnal
ZPPS Kanbas

== Members of the Legislative Assembly ==
Year	Member	Party
1957	Basawanti Shantirappa Basappa	Indian National Congress
1962	Virupakshappa Guruppa Shivdare	Indian National Congress
1967	Virupakshappa Guruppa Shivdare	Indian National Congress
1972	Virupakshappa Guruppa Shivdare	Indian National Congress
1978	Anandrao Narayan Devkate	Indian National Congress
1980	Gurunath Shivappa Patil	Janata Party
1985	Anandrao Narayan Devkate	Indian National Congress
1990	Anandrao Narayan Devkate	Indian National Congress
1995	Anandrao Narayan Devkate	Indian National Congress
1999	Anandrao Narayan Devkate	Indian National Congress
2003 By-election	Sushilkumar Shinde	Indian National Congress
2004	Sushilkumar Shinde	Indian National Congress
2005 By-election	Ratikant Shankareppa Patil	Shiv Sena
2009	Dilip Brahmdev Mane	Indian National Congress
2014	Subhash Sureshchandra Deshmukh	Bharatiya Janata Party
2019	Subhash Sureshchandra Deshmukh	Bharatiya Janata Party
2024	Subhash Sureshchandra Deshmukh	Bharatiya Janata Party

== Election results ==
=== Assembly Election 2024 ===
2024 Maharashtra Legislative Assembly election: Solapur South
Party	Candidate	Votes	%	±%
BJP	Subhash Sureshchandra Deshmukh	116,932	51.94%	▼2.31
SS(UBT)	Amar Ratikant Patil	39,805	17.68%	New
PHJSP	Moulali Bashumiya Sayyed (Baba Mistry)	26,706	11.86%	New
Independent	Dharmraj Annaraj Kadadi	18,747	8.33%	New
VBA	Santosh Sevu Pavar	11,343	5.04%	▼0.30
MNS	Mahadeo Basanna Koganure	2,155	0.96%	New
NOTA	None of the Above	826	0.37%	▼0.75
Margin of victory		77,127	34.26%	▲16.07
Turnout		225,958	59.00%	▲6.56
Total valid votes		225,132		
Registered electors		382,994		▲23.34
BJP hold		Swing	▼2.31	

=== Assembly Election 2019 ===
2019 Maharashtra Legislative Assembly election : Solapur South
Party	Candidate	Votes	%	±%
BJP	Subhash Sureshchandra Deshmukh	87,223	54.25%	▲13.74
INC	Moulali Bashumiya Sayyed (Baba Mistri)	57,976	36.06%	▲11.23
VBA	Yuvraj (Bhayya) Bhimrao Rathod	8,579	5.34%	New
AIMIM	Amitkumar Sanjay Ajanalkar (Sir)	2,005	1.25%	▼5.80
BSP	Prof. Naganath Ganapati Dupargude	1,873	1.16%	New
NOTA	None of the Above	1,793	1.12%	▲0.77
Margin of victory		29,247	18.19%	▲2.51
Turnout		162,822	52.43%	▼5.90
Total valid votes		160,779		
Registered electors		310,524		▲4.71
BJP hold		Swing	▲13.74	

=== Assembly Election 2014 ===
2014 Maharashtra Legislative Assembly election : Solapur South
Party	Candidate	Votes	%	±%
BJP	Subhash Sureshchandra Deshmukh	70,077	40.51%	New
INC	Dilip Brahmdev Mane	42,954	24.83%	▼27.75
SS	Ganesh Prakash Vankar	14,188	8.20%	▼31.49
NCP	Balasaheb Bhimashankar Shelke	12,363	7.15%	New
AIMIM	Arjun(Dada) Salgar	12,185	7.04%	New
Independent	Suresh Sidramappa Hasapure	6,344	3.67%	New
Independent	Patil Rawikant Shankarappa	4,502	2.60%	New
NOTA	None of the Above	596	0.34%	New
Margin of victory		27,123	15.68%	▲2.79
Turnout		173,920	58.65%	▲7.55
Total valid votes		172,997		
Registered electors		296,544		▲9.89
BJP gain from INC		Swing	▼12.07	

=== Assembly Election 2009 ===
2009 Maharashtra Legislative Assembly election : Solapur South
Party	Candidate	Votes	%	±%
INC	Dilip Brahmdev Mane	72,068	52.58%	▲7.78
SS	Patil Ratikant Shankareppa	54,406	39.69%	▼6.57
BSP	Turabe Suresh Kallappa	3,274	2.39%	▲0.52
MNS	Hasapure Ramesh Sidramappa	1,786	1.30%	New
Independent	Shendge Siddharam Tukaram	1,185	0.86%	New
BBM	Vijaykumar Rewappa Gaikwad	1,033	0.75%	New
Independent	Bharati Raju Yadgirikar	944	0.69%	New
Margin of victory		17,662	12.89%	▲11.42
Turnout		137,244	50.86%	▼8.85
Total valid votes		137,067		
Registered electors		269,863		▲46.60
INC gain from SS		Swing	▲6.31	

=== Assembly By-election 2005 ===
2005 Maharashtra Legislative Assembly by-election : Solapur South
Party	Candidate	Votes	%	±%
SS	Patil Ratikant Shankareppa	50,793	46.26%	▲29.08
INC	Shivdare Rajshekhar Virupakshappa	49,184	44.80%	▼7.10
RSPS	Kamble Ayyubsaheb Karimsaheb	2,419	2.20%	New
BSP	Konjari Vaksiddha Maruti	2,053	1.87%	▼0.26
Independent	Sayyed Mushtaque M. Hanif	1,126	1.03%	New
Independent	Panchappa Vishwanath Hugge	981	0.89%	New
KJHS	Gaikwad Lakshmikant Chandrakant	975	0.89%	New
Margin of victory		1,609	1.47%	▼23.44
Turnout		109,788	59.64%	▼5.46
Total valid votes		109,788		
Registered electors		184,086		▲0.00
SS gain from INC		Swing	▼5.64	

=== Assembly Election 2004 ===
2004 Maharashtra Legislative Assembly election : Solapur South
Party	Candidate	Votes	%	±%
INC	Sushilkumar Shinde	62,196	51.90%	▼39.13
Independent	Uday Ramesh Patil	32,344	26.99%	New
SS	Pise Shivajirao Dattatraya	20,598	17.19%	New
BSP	Adv.Sanjiv Sidram Sadaphule	2,558	2.13%	▼4.16
RSPS	Shingade Suresh Alra Kashiram Suryakant	2,143	1.79%	New
Margin of victory		29,852	24.91%	▼59.83
Turnout		120,009	65.19%	▲11.69
Total valid votes		119,839		
Registered electors		184,079		▲4.88
INC hold		Swing	▼39.13	

=== Assembly By-election 2003 ===
2003 Maharashtra Legislative Assembly by-election : Solapur South
Party	Candidate	Votes	%	±%
INC	Sushilkumar Shinde	85,329	91.03%	▲49.53
BSP	Sadaphule Sanjiv Sidram	5,896	6.29%	New
Independent	Kumbhar Vishnu Krishna	1,571	1.68%	New
PRP	Waghmare Sunil Tarachand	943	1.01%	New
Margin of victory		79,433	84.74%	▲77.65
Turnout		93,739	53.41%	▼8.17
Total valid votes		93,739		
Registered electors		175,515		▲12.26
INC hold		Swing	▲49.53	

=== Assembly Election 1999 ===
1999 Maharashtra Legislative Assembly election : Solapur South
Party	Candidate	Votes	%	±%
INC	Anandrao Narayan Devkate	39,951	41.50%	▲4.94
NCP	Kore Gopalrao Apparao	33,123	34.40%	New
SS	Ratikant Shankareppa Patil	22,677	23.55%	▲7.75
Margin of victory		6,828	7.09%	▲0.90
Turnout		102,337	65.45%	▼15.58
Total valid votes		96,277		
Registered electors		156,352		▲6.19
INC hold		Swing	▲4.94	

=== Assembly Election 1995 ===
1995 Maharashtra Legislative Assembly election : Solapur South
Party	Candidate	Votes	%	±%
INC	Anandrao Narayan Devkate	41,530	36.56%	▼7.25
Independent	Birajdar Bhimrao Pandit	34,494	30.37%	New
SS	Pise Shivajirao Dattatraya	17,958	15.81%	▲9.21
BSP	Patil M. Jafartaj Husentaj	11,918	10.49%	New
JD	Patil Mahadeo Jagdeo	5,042	4.44%	▼1.04
Margin of victory		7,036	6.19%	▲0.60
Turnout		116,539	79.15%	▲9.98
Total valid votes		113,596		
Registered electors		147,234		▲8.68
INC hold		Swing	▼7.25	

=== Assembly Election 1990 ===
1990 Maharashtra Legislative Assembly election : Solapur South
Party	Candidate	Votes	%	±%
INC	Anandrao Narayan Devkate	39,870	43.81%	▼16.49
Independent	Patil Sidramappa Malakappa	34,782	38.22%	New
SS	Jagatap Subhash Bhimrao	6,002	6.60%	New
JD	Darekar Shivanand Naganath	4,984	5.48%	New
Independent	Shivasharan Rama Appa	3,470	3.81%	New
Independent	Surve Chandrakant Sakharam	732	0.80%	New
Margin of victory		5,088	5.59%	▼18.75
Turnout		92,781	68.48%	▲3.81
Total valid votes		91,001		
Registered electors		135,481		▲25.01
INC hold		Swing	▼16.49	

=== Assembly Election 1985 ===
1985 Maharashtra Legislative Assembly election : Solapur South
Party	Candidate	Votes	%	±%
INC	Anandrao Narayan Devkate	41,404	60.30%	New
JP	Vishwanath Shivashankar Birajdar	24,691	35.96%	▼14.40
Independent	Shivasharan Sudhakar Shankarrao	2,141	3.12%	New
Independent	Hanmantrao Tatyasaheb Hulwade	429	0.62%	New
Margin of victory		16,713	24.34%	▲22.62
Turnout		69,923	64.52%	▼3.45
Total valid votes		68,665		
Registered electors		108,374		▲11.26
INC gain from JP		Swing	▲9.94	

=== Assembly Election 1980 ===
1980 Maharashtra Legislative Assembly election : Solapur South
Party	Candidate	Votes	%	±%
JP	Patil Gurunath Shivappa	32,768	50.36%	▲12.05
INC(I)	Devakate Anandrao Narayan	31,646	48.63%	▲9.61
Independent	Gaikwad Banasidappa	655	1.01%	New
Margin of victory		1,122	1.72%	▲1.01
Turnout		66,386	68.16%	▼2.20
Total valid votes		65,069		
Registered electors		97,402		▲7.25
JP gain from INC(I)		Swing	▲11.33	

=== Assembly Election 1978 ===
1978 Maharashtra Legislative Assembly election : Solapur South
Party	Candidate	Votes	%	±%
INC(I)	Anandrao Narayan Devkate	24,458	39.03%	New
JP	Patil Gurunath Shivappa	24,009	38.31%	New
INC	Shivadare Virpakshappa Gurappa	12,895	20.58%	▼70.64
Independent	Rajendra Yadav Talbhandare	1,309	2.09%	New
Margin of victory		449	0.72%	▼83.29
Turnout		64,834	71.39%	▲3.16
Total valid votes		62,671		
Registered electors		90,815		▲12.95
INC(I) gain from INC		Swing	▼52.19	

=== Assembly Election 1972 ===
1972 Maharashtra Legislative Assembly election : Solapur South
Party	Candidate	Votes	%	±%
INC	Virupakshappa Guruppa Shivdare	48,294	91.22%	▲13.61
RPI	Fadatare Deoram Vithal	3,815	7.21%	New
SWA	P. Y. Kanabaskar	836	1.58%	▼10.44
Margin of victory		44,479	84.01%	▲18.42
Turnout		54,252	67.48%	▲17.05
Total valid votes		52,945		
Registered electors		80,401		▲10.70
INC hold		Swing	▲13.61	

=== Assembly Election 1967 ===
1967 Maharashtra Legislative Assembly election : Solapur South
Party	Candidate	Votes	%	±%
INC	Virupakshappa Guruppa Shivdare	27,507	77.60%	▲1.38
SWA	M. B. Dheke	4,259	12.02%	New
Independent	Fadatare Deoram Vithal	2,644	7.46%	New
Independent	P. Y. Kanabaskar	1,036	2.92%	New
Margin of victory		23,248	65.59%	▲7.72
Turnout		38,310	52.75%	▼2.84
Total valid votes		35,446		
Registered electors		72,631		▲13.11
INC hold		Swing	▲1.38	

=== Assembly Election 1962 ===
1962 Maharashtra Legislative Assembly election : Solapur South
Party	Candidate	Votes	%	±%
INC	Virupakshappa Guruppa Shivdare	25,277	76.23%	▲23
Independent	Vishwanath Ramchandra Lad	6,089	18.36%	New
Independent	Appasaheb Panchappa Patil	1,795	5.41%	New
Margin of victory		19,188	57.86%	▲24.21
Turnout		35,130	54.71%	▼5.34
Total valid votes		33,161		
Registered electors		64,211		▲6.51
INC hold		Swing	▲23.00	

=== Assembly Election 1957 ===
1957 Bombay State Legislative Assembly election : South Solapur
Party	Candidate	Votes	%	±%
INC	Basawanti Shantirappa Basappa	18,284	53.22%	New
Independent	Konapure Malappa Sidlingappa	6,723	19.57%	New
ABHM	Patil Vishnu Ramrao	4,726	13.76%	New
Independent	Desmukh Balwantrao Manajirao	3,492	10.16%	New
Independent	Pawar Bhimarao Ram Chandra	1,129	3.29%	New
Margin of victory		11,561	33.65%	
Turnout		34,354	56.99%	
Total valid votes		34,354		
Registered electors		60,284		
INC win (new seat)				
