= Devendra Rajesh Kothe =

Indian politician

Member of the Maharashtra Legislative Assembly
- Incumbent
- Assumed office 2024
- Preceded by: Praniti Shinde
- Constituency: Solapur City Central

Personal details
- Born: 8 September 1990 (age 35) Solapur, Maharashtra, India
- Party: Bharatiya Janata Party
- Profession: Politician

Devendra Rajesh Kothe is an Indian politician from Maharashtra. He is a member of Bhartiya Janata Party and a member of Maharashtra Legislative Assembly elected from Solapur City Central Assembly constituency during the 2024 Legislative Assembly election.

== Early life and career ==
Devendra Kothe was born on 8 September 1990. He did his schooling at Solapur. He completed his graduation from Pune. He was previously a counsellor from Solapur Municipal Corporation.
