= Sachin Kalyanshetti =

Indian politician

- Dada

Member of the Maharashtra Legislative Assembly
- Incumbent
- Assumed office 2019
- Constituency: Akkalkot

Personal details
- Party: Bharatiya Janata Party
- Occupation: Politician

Sachin Kalyanshetti is a leader of Bharatiya Janata Party and a member of the Maharashtra Legislative Assembly elected from Akkalkot Assembly constituency in Solapur city.

== Positions held ==
- 2019: Elected to Maharashtra Legislative Assembly.
- 2024: Elected to Maharashtra Legislative Assembly.
