= Siddharam Satlingappa Mhetre =

Indian politician

Siddharam Satlingappa Mhetre is a member of the 13th Maharashtra Legislative Assembly. He represents the Akkalkot Assembly Constituency. He belongs to the Indian National Congress. He is from Lingayat community.
