= Vijay Deshmukh =

Indian politician

Minister of state Government of Maharashtra
- In office 8 July 2016 – 8 November 2019
- Chief Minister: Devendra Fadnavis
- Department: Health, Transport, Labour, Excise
- In office 5 December 2014 – 8 July 2016
- Chief Minister: Devendra Fadnavis
- Department: MSRDC, Transport, Labour, Textile

Member of the Maharashtra Legislative Assembly
- Incumbent
- Assumed office 2004
- Preceded by: Vishwanath Chakote
- Constituency: Solapur City North

Personal details
- Born: 21 October 1956 (age 69) Solapur, Maharashtra
- Party: Bharatiya Janata Party
- Parent: Siddramappa Deshmukh (father)
- Education: Bachelor of Commerce
- Occupation: Politician

Vijay Siddramappa Deshmukh is a member of the 14th Maharashtra Legislative Assembly. He represents the Solapur North Assembly constituency. He is from Lingayat Community. He belongs to the Bharatiya Janata Party. He was appointed Maharashtra's minister of state in December, 2014, he was given responsibility of Public Works (Public Undertakings), Transport Labour, Textiles. He was also given responsibility of being guardian minister of Solapur district.

Preceded by	Minister of State for Public Works, Transport, Labour and Textiles; Maharashtra State; December 2014–present	Incumbent
Political offices
Preceded by	Maharashtra State Guardian Minister for Solapur district 2014–present	Incumbent
