= Sushilkumar Shinde =

Indian politician (born 1941)

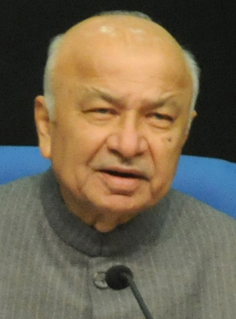
- Shinde in 2014

Leader of the House in Lok Sabha
- In office 3 August 2012 – 18 May 2014
- Speaker: Meira Kumar
- Preceded by: Pranab Mukherjee
- Succeeded by: Narendra Modi

Union Minister of Home Affairs
- In office 31 July 2012 – 26 May 2014
- Prime Minister: Manmohan Singh
- Preceded by: P. Chidambaram
- Succeeded by: Rajnath Singh

Union Minister of Power
- In office 30 January 2006 – 31 July 2012
- Prime Minister: Manmohan Singh
- Preceded by: PM Sayeed
- Succeeded by: Veerappa Moily

Governor of Andhra Pradesh
- In office 4 November 2004 – 29 January 2006
- Chief Minister: Y. S. Rajasekhara Reddy
- Preceded by: Surjit Singh Barnala
- Succeeded by: Rameshwar Thakur

15th Chief Minister of Maharashtra
- In office 18 January 2003 – 4 November 2004
- Preceded by: Vilasrao Deshmukh
- Succeeded by: Vilasrao Deshmukh

Member of Parliament, Lok Sabha
- In office 16 May 2009 — 16 May 2014
- Preceded by: Subhash Deshmukh
- Succeeded by: Sharad Bansode
- Constituency: Solapur, Maharashtra
- In office 3 March 1998 — 18 January 2003
- Preceded by: Lingaraj Valyal
- Succeeded by: Pratapsinh Mohite-Patil
- Constituency: Solapur, Maharashtra

Member of Parliament, Rajya Sabha
- In office 3 April 2006 – 16 May 2009
- Preceded by: R. S. Gavai
- Succeeded by: Vilasrao Deshmukh
- Constituency: Maharashtra
- In office 5 July 1992 – 3 March 1998
- Preceded by: Naresh Puglia
- Succeeded by: Tariq Anwar
- Constituency: Maharashtra

Personal details
- Born: 4 September 1941 (age 85) Solapur, Bombay Province, British India
- Party: Indian National Congress
- Spouse: Ujwala Shinde (m. 1970)
- Children: Praniti Shinde (daughter)
- Relatives: Shikhar Pahariya (grandson); Veer Pahariya (grandson)
- Education: Dayanand College, Solapur; Shivaji University; University of Mumbai; Solapur University

Sushilkumar Sambhaji Shinde (born 4 September 1941) is an Indian former police officer and politician from the state of Maharashtra. He was the Minister of Home Affairs, Minister of Power in the Manmohan Singh government, and the Leader of the House in Lok Sabha. He previously served as the Chief Minister of Maharashtra from 18 January 2003 to 4 November 2004. He also served as Governor of Andhra Pradesh prior to serving as central minister.

== Early life and education ==
Shinde was born in Dhor (Caste) on 4 September 1941 at Solapur to Sambhaji Rao Shinde and Sakhu Bai. Shinde completed his education with an honours degree in arts from Dayanand College, Solapur and LLB from ILS Law College and New Law College, University of Bombay, Maharashtra.

== Early career ==
Sushilkumar Shinde started his career as a bailiff in the Sessions court of Solapur where he worked from 1957 – 1965. He then joined the Maharashtra Police as a constable. Subsequently, he served in the Maharashtra CID for six years, as a sub-inspector of police, under Amukuraj Patil, his CID mentor.

== Political career ==
In the year 1971, Shinde became a member of the Congress Party. He won the Maharashtra state assembly elections in 1974, 1980, 1985, 1990, 1992, 24 May 2003 to August 2004–(General) by-election, September 2004 to 2 October 2004–(General). Shinde was elected to Rajya Sabha from Maharashtra during July 1992 to March 1998. In 1999, he acted as campaign manager of the Congress chairperson Sonia Gandhi in Amethi, Uttar Pradesh. In 2002, Shinde lost the election for the post of Vice-President of India contesting against the National Democratic Alliance candidate Bhairon Singh Shekhawat. He served as the chief minister of Maharashtra from 2003 to 2004. He was appointed the Governor of Andhra Pradesh on 30 October 2004 replacing Surjit Singh Barnala, who became the Governor of Tamil Nadu. He left the office on 29 January 2006.

Shinde was elected unopposed to the Rajya Sabha for the second time from Maharashtra on 20 March 2006. Shinde became the leader of Lok Sabha after his predecessor Pranab Mukherjee was elected President of India. Shinde served as Power minister of India from 2006 to 2012. Later, he was appointed Home Minister of India in 2012. His tenure as a Home Minister saw two major decisions of hanging the terrorists Afzal Guru and Ajmal Kasab.

During the 2012 northern India power grid failure, Shinde deflected criticism by observing that India was not alone in suffering major power outages, as the United States and Brazil had both experienced similar blackouts within the previous few years. Officials in Uttar Pradesh, where the problem was believed to have begun, said the grid could not keep up with the huge demand for power in the hot summer. Uttar Pradesh power corporation chief Awanish Kumar Awasthi stated that the grid collapse was due to the states drawing more than their allotted power to meet the summer demand.

In the 2014 Lok Sabha elections, Shinde was the Congress party nominee. He was defeated by BJP Candidate Mr. Sharad Bansode.

Sushilkumar Shinde contested the 2019 Lok Sabha elections from Solapur. Shinde was the Congress party nominee. He was defeated by BJP Candidate Mr. Siddheshwar Maharaj by a margin of 156,261 votes.

According to him, the 2019 Indian general elections were the last Lok Sabha elections contested by him.

== Personal life ==
Shinde married Ujwala Shinde on 1 May 1970. The couple has three daughters. One of his daughters Praniti Shinde is MP of Solapur, Maharashtra India.

== Awards and honours ==
- 15 January 1977: Selected in Ten Noteworthy Youth of the country by Indian Jaycees.
- 1978: Second choice as most popular Minister in the survey by 'Manohar' a weekly.
- 1981: Honoured with Basav Bhushan Award as "Ideal Youth" by Congress Party.
- 9 March 1996: "National Citizen Award" as a Best Member of Parliament at the hands of Mother Teresa.
- 2003: Bhai Bagal Award 2003, Third place at India Today – Reader's Choice The Best Chief Minister.
- 2005: Guruvarya Shankarrao Kanitkar Award at the hands of senior journalist Arun Tikekar.
- 22 September 2005 to 21 September 2007 & 21 November 2007 to 24 December 2009: Tilak Maharashtra Vidhyapeeth Chancellor.
- 23 January 2007: First D Lit. awarded by D Y Patil University. (Subject – Literature)
- 9 September 2007: Second D Lit. degree awarded by Srikrishna Devrai University, Andhra Pradesh. (Subject – Literature)
- 18 February 2009: Third D Lit. awarded by Rajiv Gandhi Technical University, Bhopal. (Subject – Science)
- 9 May 2009: "Navshakti Jeevan Gaurav Puraskar" awarded by Navshakti Times.
- 19 July 2009: Government Award of "Ideal Teacher" in memory of Education Officer Hon. B.C. Dhegale.

== Positions held ==
- 1974 – 1992: Member, Maharashtra Legislative Assembly
- 1974 – 1975: Minister of State for Sports and Cultural Affairs, Government of Maharashtra
- 1975 – 1977: Minister of State for Finance, Family Welfare, Sports and Cultural Affairs, Government of Maharashtra
- 1978: Cabinet Minister for Labour and Tourism, Government of Maharashtra
- 1983 – 1985: Cabinet Minister for Finance, Planning, Sports and Cultural Affairs, Government of Maharashtra
- 1985: Cabinet Minister for Finance, Planning, Environment, Government of Maharashtra
- 1986: Cabinet Minister for Finance, Planning, Industry, Law and Judiciary, Social Welfare, Government of Maharashtra
- 1988 – 1990: Cabinet Minister for Finance, Cultural Affairs, Sports and Planning, Government of Maharashtra
- 1990: Cabinet Minister for Urban Development, Government of Maharashtra
- 1991: Cabinet Minister for Urban Development, Law and Judiciary, Government of Maharashtra
- 1992: Elected to Rajya Sabha
- 1998 – 1999: Member, Twelfth Lok Sabha
- 1999 – 2003: Member, Thirteenth Lok Sabha
- 2003 – 2004: Member, Maharashtra Legislative Assembly
- 2004: Chief Minister, Maharashtra
- 2004 – 2006: Governor of Andhra Pradesh
- 2006: Member, Rajya Sabha and Union Cabinet Minister of Power
- 2009: Re-elected to 15th Lok Sabha
- 31 May – 31 July: Union Cabinet Minister, Power
- Aug 2012: Union Cabinet Minister, Home Affairs
- 30 Aug 2012: Leader of the House, Lok Sabha

== Theatre and films ==
The Marathi film, Dusari Goshta (2014) and a documentary film Andherese Ujale Ki Aour are based on his life from childhood to becoming a popular politician.

== See also ==
- Mayawati
- Charanjit Singh Channi
- Ram Sundar Das

Political offices
Preceded by Vilasrao Deshmukh	Chief Minister of Maharashtra; 2003–2004	Succeeded by Vilasrao Deshmukh
Preceded by Surjit Singh Barnala	Governor of Andhra Pradesh; 2004–2006	Succeeded by Rameshwar Thakur
Preceded by Suresh Prabhakar Prabhu	Minister of Power; 2006–2012	Succeeded by Veerappa Moily
Preceded by P. Chidambaram	Minister of Home Affairs; 2012–2014	Succeeded by Rajnath Singh
