= Ramkrishna Pant Bet =

Indian politician

Ramkrishna Pant Bet was the first Advocate in Padmashali caste from Solapur in Maharashtra. He led the co-operative movement to a new height in the textile city of India well known for its textile industries. He laid the foundation of the Solapur Spinning mill and the Industrial Bank which was a boon for the textile industries in Solapur.

He was elected as MLA and was in Shankarrao Chavan's ministry in the year 1977 as the cooperative minister. Before that he served as Deputy Speaker to Maharashtra Vidhan Sabha from 1972 to 1977.
