= Samadhan Autade =

Indian politician

Member of the Maharashtra Legislative Assembly
- Incumbent
- Assumed office 2 May 2021
- Preceded by: Bharat Bhalke
- Constituency: Pandharpur

Personal details
- Born: 21 November 1976 (age 49) Mangalwedha, Solapur District, Maharashtra
- Party: Bharatiya Janata Party
- Other political affiliations: Shiv Sena
- Occupation: Politician
- Website: mahabjp.org

Samadhan Mahadeo Autade is an Indian politician and member of the Maharashtra Legislative Assembly from Pandharpur. Autade is member of the Bharatiya Janata Party. He won 2021 Legislative Assembly by-elections from Pandharpur after Bharat Bhalke died of COVID-19 in 2020.
