= Praniti Shinde =

Indian politician (born 1980)

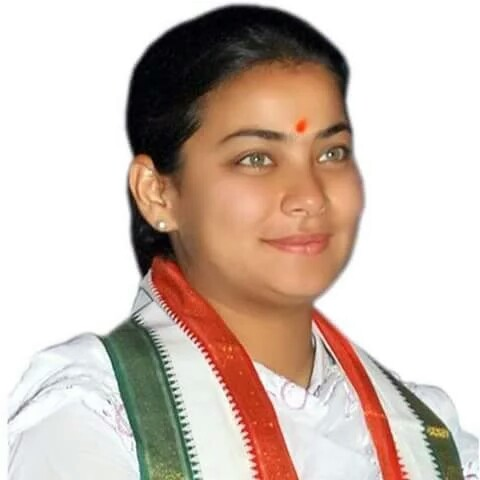
- Shinde in 2021

Member of Parliament, Lok Sabha
- Incumbent
- Assumed office 4 June 2024
- Preceded by: Jaisidhesvar Swami
- Constituency: Solapur, Maharashtra

Member of Maharashtra Legislative Assembly
- In office 2009–2024
- Governor: S. C. Jamir; K. Sankaranarayanan; Om Prakash Kohli (Additional Charge); C. Vidyasagar Rao; Bhagat Singh Koshyari; Ramesh Bais
- Speaker of Assembly: Dilip Walse-Patil; Haribhau Bagade; Nana Patole; Narhari Sitaram Zirwal (Acting); Rahul Narwekar
- Preceded by: constituency established
- Constituency: Solapur City Central

Working President of Maharashtra Pradesh Congress Committee
- Incumbent
- Assumed office 2021
- State President of Congress: Nana Patole

Chairperson of Scheduled Castes Welfare Committee of the Maharashtra Legislative Assembly
- Incumbent
- Assumed office 2021

Personal details
- Born: Praniti Sushilkumar Shinde; 9 December 1980 (age 45) Mumbai, Maharashtra, India
- Party: Indian National Congress
- Parent: Sushilkumar Shinde (father)
- Relatives: Shikhar Pahariya (nephew) Veer Pahariya (nephew)
- Education: St. Xavier's College, Mumbai, Government Law College, Mumbai
- Profession: Politician; social worker
- As of 11 October, 2022

Praniti Sushilkumar Shinde (born 9 December 1980) is an Indian politician from Maharashtra. She is a Member of Parliament from Solapur Lok Sabha constituency. She is a member of Indian National Congress Party and was a three-time Maharashtra Member of Legislative Assembly, elected from Solapur City Central constituency. She is also Working President of Maharashtra Pradesh Congress Committee from 2021 and member of the screening committee of Kerala Pradesh Congress Committee for assembly elections.

== Early life and education ==
Praniti Shinde was born on 9 December 1980 to Ujwala Shinde and Sushilkumar Shinde, former Home Minister of India. She did her schooling at Bombay Scottish School, Mahim. She completed her graduation from St. Xavier's College, Mumbai. She then completed her law degree from Government Law College, Mumbai. She is a social worker helping people through her NGO JaiJui.

== Lok Sabha Election 2024 ==
Praniti won the Lok Sabha elections of 2024 from Solapur constituency on a Congress ticket. It is a reserved constituency.
