= Raju Khare =

Indian politician

Raju Dnyanu Khare

Member of the Maharashtra Legislative Assembly
- Incumbent
- Assumed office 2024
- Preceded by: Yashwant Mane
- Constituency: Mohol

Personal details
- Born: 1976 (age 49–50) Vikhroli, Mumbai Suburban District, Maharashtra
- Party: Nationalist Congress Party – Sharadchandra Pawar

Raju Dnyanu Khare (born 1976), is an Indian politician from Maharashtra. He is an MLA from Mohol Assembly constituency, which is reserved for Scheduled Caste community, in Solapur district. He won the 2024 Maharashtra Legislative Assembly election representing the Nationalist Congress Party (SP).

== Early life and education ==
Khare is from Vikroli, Mumbai Suburban district, Maharashtra. He is the son of Khare Dnyanu Bhairu, a farmer. He passed Class 10 and discontinued in 1992 while studying Class 11 at Karmvir Bhavrao Patil School. Khare belongs to Buddhist community and Mahar Scheduled Caste.

== Career ==
Khare won from Mohol Assembly constituency representing Nationalist Congress Party (SP) in the 2024 Maharashtra Legislative Assembly election. He polled 125,838 votes and defeated his nearest rival, Mane Yashwant Vitthal of the Nationalist Congress Party, by a margin of 30,202 votes.
