= Veer Pahariya =

Indian actor

- Born: Veer Sanjay Pahariya; February 1, 1995 (age 31); Mumbai, Maharashtra, India
- Occupations: Actor, assistant director
- Years active: 2022–present
- Known for: Sky Force
- Parents: Sanjay Pahariya; Sangeeta Pahariya
- Relatives: Shikhar Pahariya (brother); Sushilkumar Shinde (maternal grandfather)

Veer Pahariya (born 1 February 1995) is an Indian actor who appears in Hindi films. He first worked as an assistant director before making his acting debut. He gained prominence in 2025 with his lead role in the patriotic action-drama Sky Force.

== Early life and background ==
Veer Pahariya was born in Mumbai, Maharashtra, to businessman Sanjay Pahariya and his wife, Sangeeta. He is the maternal grandson of Sushilkumar Shinde, the former Chief Minister of Maharashtra. He has a brother, Shikhar Pahariya. According to his IMDb biography, Pahariya studied theatre in the United States and later started a Hindi pop music channel on YouTube while in London.

== Career ==
Pahariya began his film career as an assistant director on the 2022 Hindi horror-comedy film Bhediya.

He made his acting debut in 2025 with Sky Force, starring alongside Akshay Kumar, Sara Ali Khan, and Nimrat Kaur. The film is a historical drama based on the Indo-Pakistani War of 1965 and depicts India's retaliatory airstrike on the Pakistani airbase at Sargodha.

In Sky Force, Pahariya portrayed Squadron Leader Ajjamada Boppayya Devayya, a real-life war hero from the Indian Air Force. For his valour in the 1965 war, Devayya was posthumously awarded the Maha Vir Chakra.

Pahariya's performance received positive reviews from critics. He was noted for an impressive debut and was described as the "surprise package" of the film. The film went on to have a strong opening at the box office, with Pahariya being credited as one of the few debutants to achieve a major opening-day success.

== Filmography ==
Year	Title	Role	Director(s)	Notes
2022	Bhediya	—N/a	Amar Kaushik	Assistant director
2025	Sky Force	Squadron Leader Ajjamada B. Devayya	Sandeep Kewlani; Abhishek Anil Kapur	Acting debut in a lead role
