= Dilip Mane =

Indian politician

Member of Legislative Assembly of Maharashtra
- In office October 2009 – August 2014
- Constituency: Solapur South

Personal details
- Party: Indian National Congress
- Other political affiliations: Shiv Sena

Dilip Bramhadev Mane is a Shiv Sena politician from Solapur district. He was a member of Maharashtra Legislative Assembly representing Solapur South constituency from 2009 to 2014.

== Positions held ==
- 2009: Elected as Member of Maharashtra Legislative Assembly
