= Ramesh Kadam (politician) =

Indian politician

Ramesh Kadam was a leader of the Nationalist Congress Party and a member of the Maharashtra Legislative Assembly. In August 2015, he was arrested for alleged fraud and embezzlement of funds from a state-run corporation.

He is now incarcerated in the state-of-the-art cell at Arthur Road Jail which was previously constructed for Ajmal Kasab. The cell is reportedly air conditioned.
