= Nandgaon =

Nandgaon may refer to:

- Nandgaon Khandeshwar, town and a tehsil in Amravati subdivision, Maharashtra, India
- Nandgaon, Maharashtra, a town in Nashik district of Maharashtra, India
  - Nandgaon (Vidhan Sabha constituency), one of the fifteen constituencies of Maharashtra Vidhan Sabha
- Nandgaon, Mawal, a village in Pune district of Maharashtra, India
- Nandgaon, Uttar Pradesh, a village in Mathura district of Uttar Pradesh, India
- Rajnandgaon, also known as Rajnandgaon or Nandgaon, a town in the,
  - Rajnandgaon district in Chhattisgarh state of central India
  - Nandgaon State, a former princely state in central India
- Nandgaon, Jalgaon
