= 1990 Maharashtra Legislative Assembly election =

State assembly election in India

Maharashtra State Assembly Elections 1990
- 27 February 1990

All 288 assembly constituencies to Maharashtra Legislative Assembly 145 seats needed for a majority
- Turnout: 62.26% (▲3.09%)
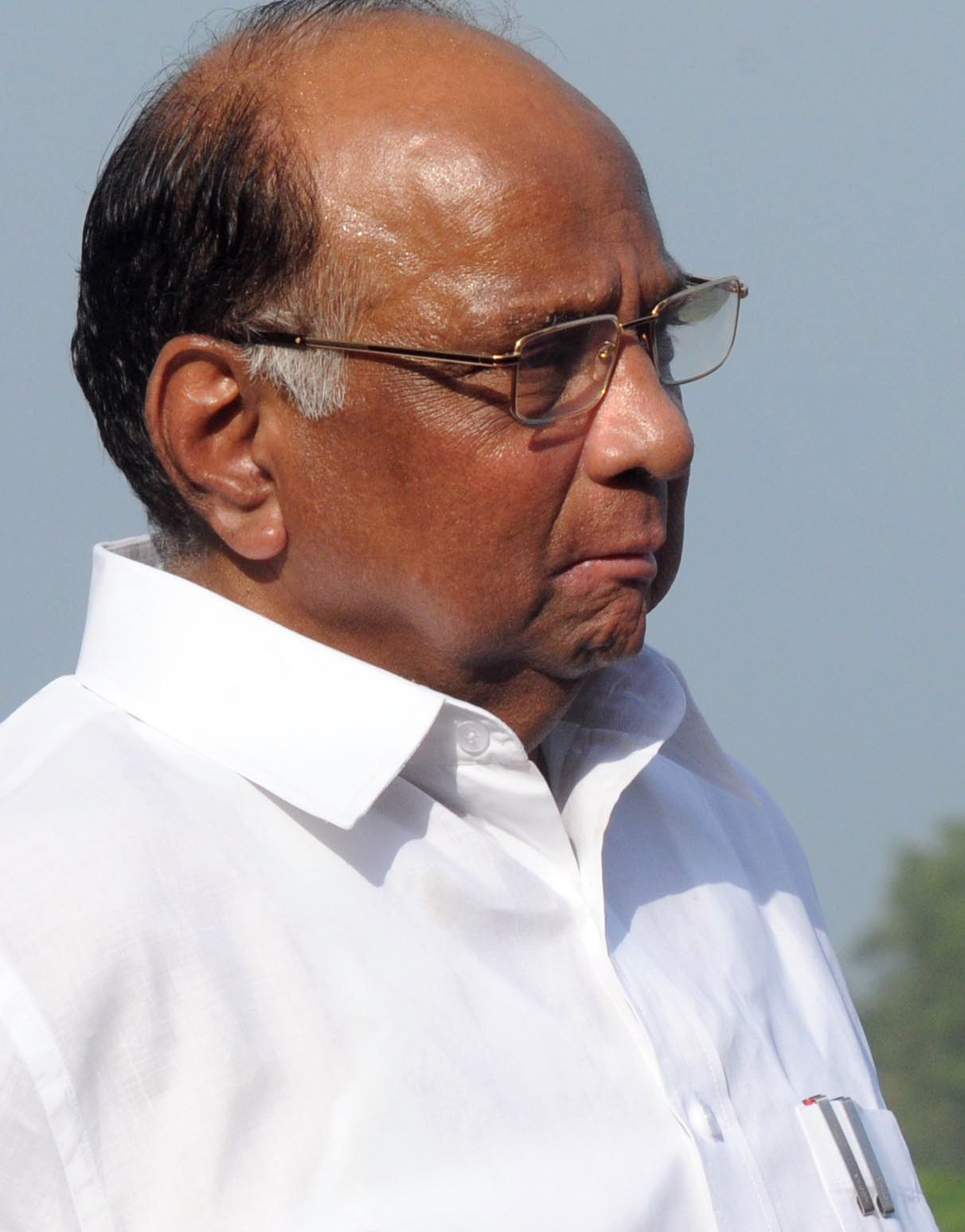

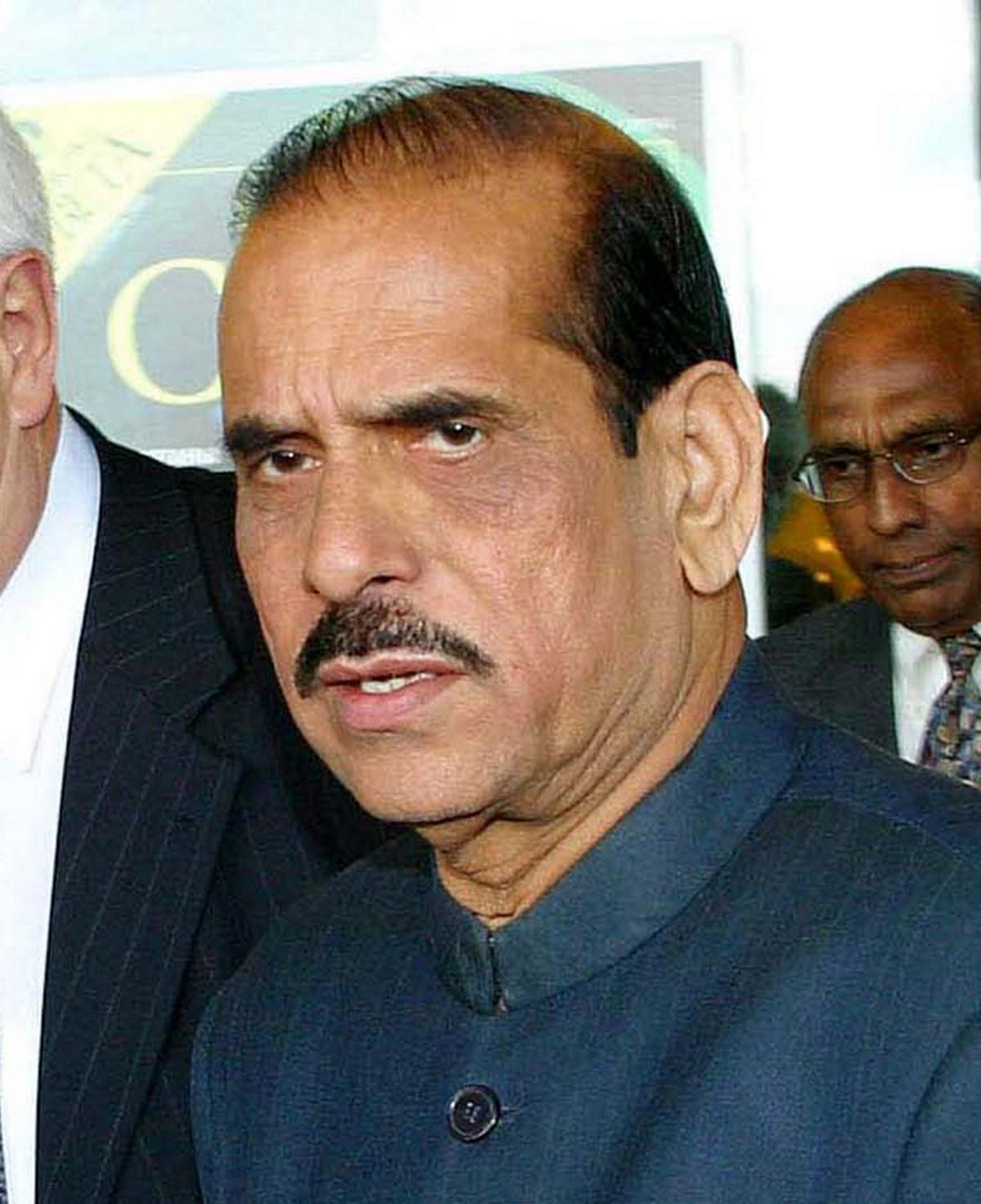

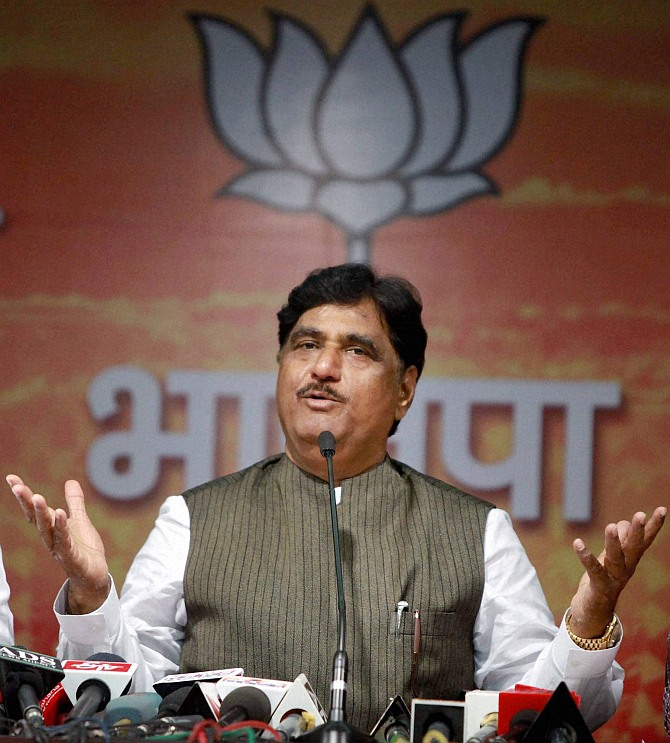
	Majority party	Minority party	Third party
Leader	Sharad Pawar	Manohar Joshi	Gopinath Munde
Party	INC	SS	BJP
Alliance	INC+	BJP+	BJP+
Leader's seat	Baramati (Won)	Dadar (Won)	Renapur (Won)
Last election	161	Not Contested in 1985	16
Seats won	141	52	42
Seat change	▼20	▲52	▲26
Popular vote	11,334,773	4,733,834	3,180,482
Percentage	38.17%	15.94%	10.71%
Swing	▼5.24%	▲15.94%	▲3.26%
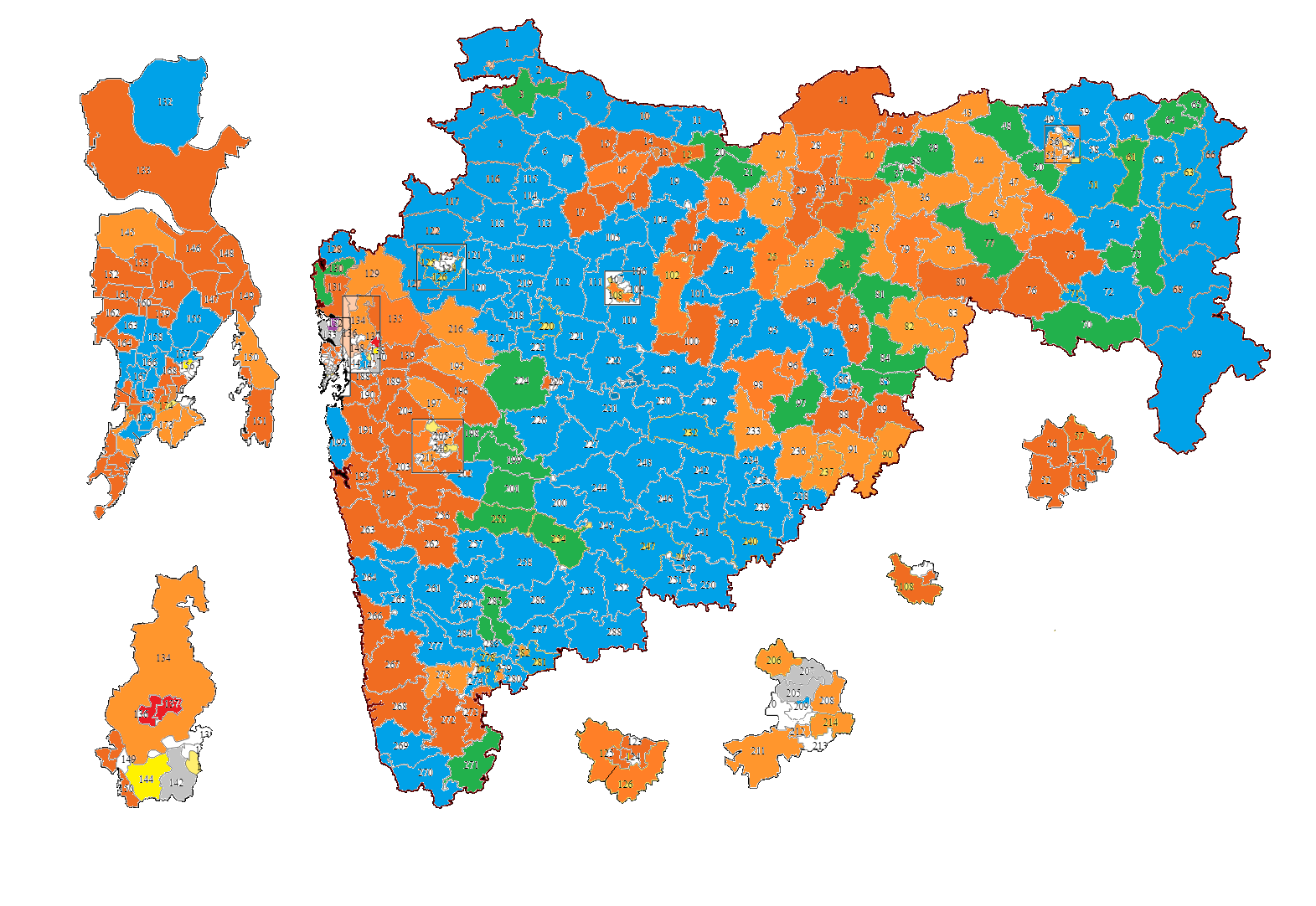
Chief Minister before election
Sharad Pawar
INC
Elected Chief Minister
Sharad Pawar
INC

The Maharashtra State Assembly election, 1990 was held in Maharashtra, India in 1990, to elect 288 members of the Maharashtra Legislative Assembly.

== Parties and alliances ==
Party	Flag	Symbol	Leader	Seats
Indian National Congress			Sharad Pawar	276

SHS-BJP Alliance
Party	Flag	Symbol	Leader	Seats
Shiv Sena			Manohar Joshi	183
Bharatiya Janata Party			Gopinath Munde	104
Total				287

== Results ==
List of Political Parties participated in 1990 Maharashtra Assembly Elections.

Party	Abbreviation
National Parties
Bharatiya Janata Party	BJP
Indian National Congress	INC
Indian Congress (Socialist) – Sarat Chandra Sinha	ICS(SCS)
Janata Party	JP
Lok Dal (Bahuguna)	LKD(B)
Janata Dal	JD
Communist Party of India (Marxist)	CPM
Communist Party of India	CPI
State Parties
Indian Union Muslim League	IUML
Peasants and Workers Party	PWP
All India Forward Bloc	AIFB
Bahujan Samaj Party	BSP
Registered (Unrecognised) Parties
Akhil Bharatiya Hindu Mahasabha	HMS
Shiv Sena	SHS
All India Majlis-e-Ittehadul Muslimeen	AIMIM
Doordarshi Party	DDP
Bolshevik Party of India	BPI
Communist Party of India (Marxist–Leninist)	CPI(ML)
Indian People's Front	IPF
Republican Party of India	RPI
Republican Party of India (Khobragade)	RPI(K)
All India Dalit Muslim Minorities Suraksha Mahasangh	DMM
Hul Jharkhand Party	HJP
Azad Hind Fauz (Rajkiya)	AHF(R)
Bharatiya Republican Paksha	BRP
Proutist Bloc India	PBI
Akhil Bharatiya Maratha Mahasangh	MMS
Bharatiya Krishi Udyog Sangh	BKUS
Akhil Bharatiya Revolutionary Shoshit Samaj Dal	BRSS
Bharatiya Loktantrik Mazdoor Sangh	LMD
Republican Party of India (Balakrishnan)	RPI(B)
Republican Presidium Party of India	RPPI
Sampooran Rashtriya Sena	SRS
Bharatiya Surajya Paksha	SYP
Vishal Bharat Party	VBP

Indian National Congress won the most number of seats. And Sharad Pawar was sworn in as the 7th Chief minister of Maharashtra.

Summary of results of the Maharashtra State Assembly election, 1990

Political Party	Seats			Popular Vote		
Political Party	Contested	Won	Change +/-	Votes polled	Votes%	Change +/-
Indian National Congress 141 / 288 (49%)	276	141	▼20	11,334,773	38.17%	▼5.24%
Shiv Sena 52 / 288 (18%)	183	52	▲52	4,733,834	15.94%	▲15.94% (Not Contested in 1985)
Bharatiya Janata Party 42 / 288 (15%)	104	42	▲26	3,180,482	10.71%	▲3.46%
Janata Dal 24 / 288 (8%)	214	24	▲24	3,776,737	12.72%	▲12.72% (New Party)
Peasants and Workers Party of India 8 / 288 (3%)	40	8	▼5	719,807	2.42%	▼1.35%
Communist Party of India (Marxist) 3 / 288 (1%)	13	3	▲1	258,433	0.87%	▲0.08%
Communist Party of India 2 / 288 (0.7%)	16	2	Steady	219,080	0.74%	▼0.18%
Indian Congress (Socialist) – Sarat Chandra Sinha 1 / 288 (0.3%)	71	1	▼53 (from IC(S) seats)	290,503	0.98%	▼16.30% (from IC(S) vote share)
Indian Union Muslim League 1 / 288 (0.3%)	9	1	▲1	150,926	0.51%	▲0.51% (Not Contested in 1985)
Republican Party of India (Khobragade) 1 / 288 (0.3%)	18	1	▲1	147,683	0.50%	▼0.02%
Bharatiya Republican Paksha	43	0	(New Party)	338,685	1.14%	▲1.14% (New Party)
Republican Party of India	21	0	Steady	206,486	0.70%	▼0.30%
Bahujan Samaj Party	122	0	(New Party)	126,026	0.42%	▲0.42% (New Party)
Janata Party	11	0	▼20	31,349	0.11%	▼7.27%
Independents 13 / 288 (5%)	2286	13	▼7	4,036,403	13.59%	▼3.90%
Total	3764	288	Steady	29,693,838	62.26%	▲3.09%

== Region-wise Breakup ==
Region	Total seats	Indian National Congress		Shivsena		Bharatiya Janata Party		Janata Dal		Others
Western Maharashtra	76	56		04	▲04	02		08	▲08	06
Vidarbha	62	25		04	▲04	13		09	▲09	11
Marathwada	47	21		14	▲14	05		02	▲02	05
Thane+Konkan	29	08		11	▲11	05		02	▲02	03
Mumbai	34	09		15	▲15	09		00	Steady	01
North Maharashtra	40	22		04	▲04	08		03	▲03	03
Total	288	141	▼20	52	▲52	42	▲26	24	▲24	29

141	52	42
INC	SHS	BJP

== District-wise Results ==
Name of Division	District	Seats	INC		SHS		BJP	
Amravati Division	Akola	5	2		1	▲1	1	
Amravati Division	Amravati	8	8		0	Steady	0	
Amravati Division	Buldhana	7	3		3	▲3	1	
Amravati Division	Yavatmal	7	3		4	▲4	0	
Amravati Division	Washim	3	2		0	Steady	0	
Total Seats		30	18		8	▲8	2	
Aurangabad Division	Aurangabad	9	4		5	▲1	1	
Aurangabad Division	Beed	6	3		1	▲1	2	
Aurangabad Division	Jalna	5	5		0	Steady	0	
Aurangabad Division	Osmanabad	4	2		2	▲1	0	
Aurangabad Division	Nanded	9	5		2	▲1	1	
Aurangabad Division	Latur	6	6		0	Steady	0	
Aurangabad Division	Parbhani	4	3		1	▲1	0	
Aurangabad Division	Hingoli	3	2		1	▲1	0	
Total Seats		46	30		12	▲12	4	
Konkan Division	Mumbai City	9	3		2	▲1	1	
Konkan Division	Mumbai Suburban	26	6		9	▲1	4	
Konkan Division	Thane	24	1		5	▲1	4	
Konkan Division	Raigad	7	1		4	▲1	0	
Konkan Division	Ratnagiri	3	1		0	Steady	0	
Total Seats		69	12		20	▲20	9	
Nagpur Division	Bhandara	3	2		1	▲1	0	
Nagpur Division	Chandrapur	6	3		0	Steady	3	
Nagpur Division	Gadchiroli	3	3		0	Steady	0	
Nagpur Division	Gondia	4	2		0	Steady	2	
Nagpur Division	Nagpur	12	7		0	Steady	5	
Nagpur Division	Wardha	4	2		0	Steady	0	
Total Seats		32	19		1	▲1	10	
Nashik Division	Dhule	5	5		0	Steady	0	
Nashik Division	Jalgaon	11	7		2	▲1	2	
Nashik Division	Nandurbar	4	4		0	Steady	0	
Nashik Division	Nashik	15	10		1	▲1	0	
Nashik Division	Ahmednagar	12	9		2	▲1	0	
Total Seats		47	35		5	▲5	2	
Pune Division	Kolhapur	10	2		1	▲1	1	
Pune Division	Pune	21	21		0	Steady	0	
Pune Division	Sangli	8	1		2	▲1	3	
Pune Division	Satara	8	1		2	▲1	1	
Pune Division	Solapur	13	9	▲1	0	Steady	1	▲1
Total Seats		58	27		6	▲6	5	
Total Seats		288	141	▼20	52	▲52	42	▲26

=== Analysis ===
According to journalist Makarand Gadgil, 1990 election was a "watershed election in Maharashtra's politics". Because, the right-wing BJP and Shiv Sena emerged as the major opposition for the first time winning 94 seats. Whereas until 1990 election, various left-wing parties like the Peasants and Workers Party, Indian National Congress (Socialist), Janata Party, Janata Dal, Republican Party of India, Communist Party of India and Communist Party of India (Marxist) were the main opposition. These parties won 38 seats in the 1990 election. They won only 8 seats in the 2009 Assembly election showing that their decline has continued.

== Results by constituency ==
Winner, runner-up, voter turnout, and victory margin in every constituency
Assembly Constituency		Turnout	Winner				Runner Up				Margin
#k	Names	%	Candidate	Party	Votes	%	Candidate	Party	Votes	%	Margin
1	Sawantwadi	64.41%	Bhonsle Pravin Prataprao	INC	39,189	45.40%	Jayanand Mathkar	JD	28,550	33.07%	10,639
2	Vengurla	66.14%	Pushpasen Sawant	JD	43,946	54.12%	Sitaram Narayan Desai	INC	20,316	25.02%	23,630
3	Malvan	67.53%	Narayan Tatu Rane	SS	31,466	39.26%	Y. D. Sawant	INC	24,051	30.01%	7,415
4	Deogad	68.39%	Appa Gogate	BJP	41,126	52.51%	A. G. Alias Dada Rane	INC	26,176	33.42%	14,950
5	Rajapur	68.01%	Hatankar Laxman Rangnath	INC	41,197	48.04%	Narvekar Chandrakant Balkrishna	SS	29,543	34.45%	11,654
6	Ratnagiri	60.46%	Gotad Shivajirao Ramchandra	BJP	39,823	43.81%	Shivajirao Jadyar	INC	31,729	34.91%	8,094
7	Sangameshwar	63.84%	Ravindra Muralidhar Mane	SS	32,385	40.15%	Jagannath Jadhav	JD	22,151	27.46%	10,234
8	Guhagar	67.88%	Shridhar Dattatray Natu	BJP	48,116	55.10%	Bendal Ramchandra Sadashiv	INC	36,716	42.04%	11,400
9	Chiplun	67.90%	Bapu Khedekar	SS	31,103	37.51%	Balasaheb Mate	Independent	30,460	36.73%	643
10	Khed	68.93%	Ramdas Gangaram Kadam	SS	39,191	46.31%	Bhosale Keshavarao Jagatarao	Independent	24,889	29.41%	14,302
11	Dapoli	68.80%	Dalvi Suryakant Shivram	SS	46,882	52.87%	Vidya Belose	INC	21,917	24.72%	24,965
12	Mahad	69.29%	Prabhakar Sundarrao More	SS	32,220	36.84%	Sudhakar Shankar Sawant	INC	29,110	33.28%	3,110
13	Shrivardhan	61.60%	Raut Ravindra Narayan	INC	41,032	45.52%	Pandurang Bandhuji Sawant	SS	34,882	38.69%	6,150
14	Mangaon	63.39%	Ashok Sabale	INC	38,834	42.92%	Bhai Sawant	PWPI	27,557	30.46%	11,277
15	Pen	65.73%	Mohan Mahadeo Patil	PWPI	51,184	51.52%	Mahatre Balaji Damaji	INC	40,904	41.17%	10,280
16	Alibag	72.00%	Patil Dattatrey Narayan	PWPI	58,878	51.03%	Kawale Vijay Namdev	INC	43,596	37.79%	15,282
17	Panvel	63.86%	Dattatraya Narayan Patil	PWPI	45,693	39.06%	Ganapat Ragho Patil Alias G. R. Patil	INC	43,007	36.76%	2,686
18	Khalapur	62.78%	Devendra Vitthal Satam	SS	46,611	42.83%	Mundhe Ram Ganpat	INC	36,298	33.35%	10,313
19	Colaba	41.89%	Patrawala Marazban Jal	INC	19,945	40.25%	Gawade Dnyaneshwar Bhimmaji	SS	14,007	28.27%	5,938
20	Umarkhadi	56.79%	Bashir Moosa Patel	AIML	34,886	48.92%	Jawkar Satyawan Ganpat	SS	22,561	31.64%	12,325
21	Mumbadevi	45.54%	Raj K. Purohit	BJP	25,955	49.98%	Lali Jamnadas Kapadia	INC	18,706	36.02%	7,249
22	Khetwadi	46.69%	Premkumar Shankardatt Sharma	BJP	27,006	47.98%	Prakash Binsale	INC	20,135	35.77%	6,871
23	Opera House	55.08%	Chandrakant Shankar Padwal	SS	29,757	52.69%	Prabhu Chandrashekhar	INC	20,222	35.81%	9,535
24	Malabar Hill	48.61%	Balvantray Ambelal Desai	INC	29,474	38.10%	Amar Jariwala	BJP	19,778	25.57%	9,696
25	Chinchpokli	49.04%	Annasaheb Alias B. D. Zute	INC	25,236	41.16%	Abdul Alim Khan	BJP	15,002	24.47%	10,234
26	Nagpada	52.13%	Dr. Syed Ahmed (politician)	INC	21,026	32.54%	Yusuf Husain Mujawar	AIML	19,467	30.13%	1,559
27	Mazgaon	57.07%	Chhagan Bhujbal	SS	36,790	50.80%	Eknath (Bhai) Bandal	INC	30,141	41.62%	6,649
28	Parel	61.36%	Vithal Chavan	SS	44,907	50.95%	Sharad Khatu	JD	22,899	25.98%	22,008
29	Shivadi	52.37%	Datta Rane	BJP	31,442	38.26%	Dadu Santu Atyalkar	JD	23,192	28.22%	8,250
30	Worli	58.43%	Nalawade Datta Shankar	SS	31,718	42.59%	Nanaware Vasant Pandurang	INC	22,312	29.96%	9,406
31	Naigaon	64.26%	Kolambkar Kalidas Nilkanth	SS	44,415	48.49%	Vilas Vishnu Sawant	INC	37,437	40.87%	6,978
32	Dadar	63.72%	Manohar Joshi	SS	47,617	54.99%	Bhaurao Patil	INC	24,367	28.14%	23,250
33	Matunga	96.13%	Chandrakanta Goyal	BJP	32,355	33.45%	V. Subramnian	INC	29,150	30.14%	3,205
34	Mahim	58.91%	Suresh Anant Gambhir	SS	37,587	43.70%	Shyam Shetty	INC	25,652	29.83%	11,935
35	Dharavi	48.62%	Dr. Jyoti Gaikwad	INC	46,643	41.33%	Ramesh Medhekar	BJP	39,430	34.94%	7,213
36	Vandre	48.26%	Salim Zakaria	INC	34,251	45.44%	Ramdas Nayak	BJP	30,086	39.92%	4,165
37	Kherwadi	57.42%	Madhukar Sarpotdar	SS	42,742	45.68%	Kamble Vijay Baburao	INC	41,948	44.83%	794
38	Vile Parle	51.56%	Dr. Ramesh Yashsant Prabhoo	SS	44,408	45.79%	Pushpakant Anant Mhatre	INC	31,520	32.50%	12,888
39	Amboli	54.28%	Shantaram Soma Ambre	SS	47,921	34.29%	Makwana Ismail Mohammed	AIML	39,728	28.43%	8,193
40	Santacruz	52.78%	Abhiram Singh	BJP	40,854	37.13%	Oommachen C. D.	INC	34,647	31.49%	6,207
41	Andheri	54.22%	Ramesh Dubey	INC	62,276	44.36%	More Ramesh Shankar	SS	61,264	43.64%	1,012
42	Goregaon	54.54%	Subhash Desai	SS	47,021	40.98%	Sharad Rao	JD	46,426	40.46%	595
43	Malad	51.66%	Gajanan Kirtikar	SS	80,364	44.43%	Chandrakant Tripathi	INC	71,125	39.32%	9,239
44	Kandivali	47.50%	Chandrakant Gosalia	INC	52,725	39.83%	Ratnakar Kamat	BJP	40,618	30.68%	12,107
45	Borivali	49.09%	Hemendra Mehta	BJP	96,038	56.94%	Sutrale Vijay Ramdas	INC	38,160	22.62%	57,878
46	Trombay	57.01%	Javed Iqbal Khan	INC	97,715	56.09%	Acharya Sharad Narayan	SS	66,447	38.14%	31,268
47	Chembur	55.20%	Hashu Advani	BJP	49,739	47.76%	Chandrakant Handore	RPI	49,071	47.12%	668
48	Nehrunagar	58.29%	Suryakant Mahadik	SS	40,409	39.96%	Sajid Rashid	JD	33,197	32.83%	7,212
49	Kurla	53.92%	Mayekar Ramakant Shankar	SS	64,794	40.51%	Celine D. Silva	INC	59,543	37.23%	5,251
50	Ghatkopar	56.90%	Prakash Mehta	BJP	53,733	48.62%	Bakshi Verandra	INC	40,982	37.09%	12,751
51	Bhandup	60.32%	Liladhar Dake	SS	70,834	44.86%	Patil Dinanath Bama	INC	58,523	37.06%	12,311
52	Mulund	56.96%	Vamanrao Ganpatrao Parab	BJP	73,438	50.90%	R. R. Singh	INC	55,566	38.51%	17,872
53	Thane	54.54%	Moreshwar Damodar Joshi	SS	94,236	58.50%	Kanti Kisan Koli	INC	53,237	33.05%	40,999
54	Belapur	51.59%	Ganesh Naik	SS	1,14,947	49.00%	Manohar Rama Salvi	INC	87,386	37.25%	27,561
55	Ulhasnagar	59.56%	Suresh @ Pappu Budharmal Kalani	INC	88,804	69.02%	Harchandani Sitaldas Khubchand	BJP	34,549	26.85%	54,255
56	Ambernath	53.58%	Sabir Shaikh	SS	71,322	48.31%	Sanjay Satish Dutt	INC	30,121	20.40%	41,201
57	Kalyan	53.36%	Jagannath Shivram Patil	BJP	106,145	59.99%	Bhoir Sudam Hari	INC	59,392	33.56%	46,753
58	Murbad	67.65%	Gotiram Padu Pawar	INC	50,083	53.06%	Digambar Narayan Vishe	BJP	39,700	42.06%	10,383
59	Wada	53.12%	Vishnu Rama Savar	BJP	48,184	49.99%	Duinada Laxman Kadya	INC	35,656	36.99%	12,528
60	Bhiwandi	50.77%	Taware Parsharam Dhondu	JD	60,818	38.50%	Raghunath (Appa) Padyal	SS	39,123	24.77%	21,695
61	Vasai	64.38%	Thakur Appa Urf Hitendra Vishnu	INC	92,958	59.90%	Dominik John Gonsalvis	JD	46,490	29.96%	46,468
62	Palghar	58.76%	Avinash Baliram Sutar	SS	36,141	39.20%	Kaluram Kakadya Dhodade	JD	28,424	30.83%	7,717
63	Dahanu	55.63%	Nam Shankar Sakharam	INC	35,981	40.80%	Keny Ramkrishna Mangesh	SS	19,937	22.61%	16,044
64	Jawhar	53.17%	Kom Lahanu Shidva	CPI(M)	39,408	48.19%	Kom Ladkya Radka	INC	23,060	28.20%	16,348
65	Shahapur	57.31%	Mahadu Nago Barora	INC	34,998	48.94%	Padmakar Namdeo Kewhari	SS	34,880	48.78%	118
66	Igatpuri	49.19%	Yadavrao Anandrao Bambale	BJP	22,656	32.25%	Ghare Vitthalrao Ganpat	Independent	19,632	27.95%	3,024
67	Nashik	54.32%	Kathe Ganpatrao Pundalik	BJP	64,425	48.27%	Khaire Pandharinath Sadhavrao	INC	58,801	44.05%	5,624
68	Deolali	48.10%	Babanrao Gholap	SS	53,400	56.83%	Sadaphule Ramdas Dayaram (Baba)	Independent	21,153	22.51%	32,247
69	Sinnar	65.76%	Dighole Tukaram Sakharam	INC	46,830	50.58%	Gadhak Suryabhan Sukdeo	JD	26,536	28.66%	20,294
70	Niphad	67.39%	Mogal Malojirao Sadashiv	INC	45,447	42.57%	Shinde Gangadhar Narayan (G. N. )	SS	29,088	27.24%	16,359
71	Yevla	60.41%	Marutirao Narayan Pawar	INC	36,721	39.42%	Arun Laxman Thorat	SS	24,067	25.83%	12,654
72	Nandgaon	62.65%	Dhatrak Jagannath Murlidhar	INC	20,406	20.08%	Ashok Yadavrao Rasal	SS	16,360	16.10%	4,046
73	Malegaon	70.17%	Nihal Ahmed Maulavi Mohammed Usman	JD	67,944	50.39%	Haji Shabbir Ahmed Haji Gulam Rasool	INC	35,668	26.46%	32,276
74	Dabhadi	61.23%	Hiray Pushpatai Vyakatarao	INC	43,460	46.65%	Nikam Ashok Damodar	SS	32,577	34.97%	10,883
75	Chandwad	63.68%	Kasliwal Jaichand Deepchand	BJP	39,514	46.26%	Shirishkumar Vasantrao Kotwal	INC	29,264	34.26%	10,250
76	Dindori	55.79%	Gaikwad Bhagawantrao Dharmaji	INC	41,837	50.95%	Khetade Ramdas Daulat	SS	22,302	27.16%	19,535
77	Surgana	55.62%	Jiva Pandu Gavit	CPI(M)	39,753	51.76%	Bhoye Sitaram Sayaji	INC	23,154	30.15%	16,599
78	Kalwan	60.26%	Arjun Tulshiram Pawar	BJP	49,516	59.15%	Bahiram Kashinath Narayan	INC	30,088	35.94%	19,428
79	Baglan	53.88%	Ahire Lahanu Bala	INC	33,111	43.73%	Borse Dilip Mangalu	JD	25,080	33.12%	8,031
80	Sakri	51.82%	Govindrao Shivram Chaudhary	BJP	29,402	35.75%	Chaure Bapu Hari	INC	29,289	35.61%	113
81	Navapur	61.60%	Surupsingh Hirya Naik	INC	66,510	67.41%	Thakare Ambar Barik	BJP	16,728	16.95%	49,782
82	Nandurbar	55.75%	Valvi Pratap Kubaji	INC	43,342	49.15%	Gavit Krushnarao Damaji	JD	37,206	42.19%	6,136
83	Talode	58.63%	Dilwarsing D. Padvi	BJP	40,619	55.40%	Valvi Arjunsing Pirsing	INC	13,431	18.32%	27,188
84	Akrani	61.43%	K. V. Padvia	JD	38,872	52.06%	Bhandari Tarasing Chandrasing	INC	34,956	46.81%	3,916
85	Shahada	73.39%	Dr. Deshmukh Hemant Bhaskar	INC	57,601	50.20%	Annasaheb P. K. Patil	JD	52,406	45.67%	5,195
86	Shirpur	67.19%	Amrishbhai Rasiklal Patel	INC	60,344	58.82%	Vishwasrao Patil	BJP	27,226	26.54%	33,118
87	Sindkheda	68.83%	Bhadane Dattatray Waman	INC	44,299	51.21%	Rajput Thansing Jibhau Alias Mangalsing Nimji	JD	27,050	31.27%	17,249
88	Kusumba	67.33%	Rohidas Chudaman Patil	INC	64,742	67.47%	Khairnar Gulabrao Jayvantrao	SS	15,857	16.53%	48,885
89	Dhule	55.46%	Borse Shalini Sudhakar	INC	33,266	33.78%	Bapu Shardul	SS	32,210	32.70%	1,056
90	Chalisgaon	45.41%	Ishwar Ramchandra Jadhav	BJP	27,315	34.95%	Changare Vasudeoram Apuram	INC	18,066	23.12%	9,249
91	Parola	58.85%	Vasantrao Jivanrao More	INC	31,511	31.67%	Patil Bhaskarrao Rajaram	Independent	28,830	28.97%	2,681
92	Amalner	62.88%	Gulabrao Wamanrao Patil	JD	44,211	44.53%	Dajiba Parvat Patil	INC	31,714	31.94%	12,497
93	Chopda	69.89%	Arunlal Gowardhandas Gujrathi	INC	54,805	58.61%	Rana Ganesh Jagannath	SS	18,644	19.94%	36,161
94	Erandol	63.69%	Hari Atmaram Mahajan	SS	36,685	37.40%	Wagh Parvatabai Chandrabhan	INC	32,068	32.69%	4,617
95	Jalgaon	61.15%	Sureshkumar Bhikamchand Jain	INS(SCS)	61,562	50.41%	Ishwarlal Shankarlal Jain	INC	36,792	30.13%	24,770
96	Pachora	60.58%	Patil Krishnarao Maharu	INC	34,565	35.21%	Onkar Narayan Wagh	JD	34,542	35.19%	23
97	Jamner	64.03%	Dattatray Ughadu Mahajan	INC	31,531	34.21%	Pralhadrao Eknathrao Patil	INS(SCS)	27,956	30.33%	3,575
98	Bhusawal	49.76%	Phalak Nilkanth Chintaman	INC	34,838	36.53%	Rajabhau Pawar	BJP	27,891	29.24%	6,947
99	Yawal	67.82%	Chaudhary Ramesh Vitthal	INC	44,668	48.75%	Arun Govinda Mahajan	BJP	37,607	41.05%	7,061
100	Raver	72.73%	Mahukar Dhanaji Chaudhari	INC	42,116	39.79%	Gunwant Rambhan Sarode	BJP	36,837	34.80%	5,279
101	Edlabad	67.44%	Eknath Khadse	BJP	35,052	34.86%	G. N. Patil	INC	32,390	32.21%	2,662
102	Malkapur	68.88%	Tangade Dayaram Sugdeo	BJP	33,578	34.98%	Kolte Dinkar Yadao	INC	30,578	31.86%	3,000
103	Buldhana	68.14%	Gode Rajendra Vyankatrao	SS	43,244	39.33%	Shingane Bhaskarrao Sampatrao	INC	42,478	38.64%	766
104	Washim	56.02%	Lakhan Malik	BJP	27,668	35.65%	Kamble Bhimrao Haibati	INC	23,761	30.62%	3,907
105	Mangrulpir	66.13%	Thakare Subhashrao Pandhari	Independent	28,200	29.83%	Rathod Gokuldas Devisingh	INC	24,884	26.32%	3,316
106	Mehkar	74.18%	Subodh Keshao Saoji	INC	54,219	49.10%	Jadhao Prataprao Ganpatrao	SS	44,609	40.40%	9,610
107	Khamgaon	68.99%	Kokare Nana Nimbaji	BJP	31,150	26.82%	Deshmukh Prakashrao Keshaorao	INC	27,994	24.10%	3,156
108	Jalamb	75.16%	Krushnarao Ganpatrao Ingle	SS	39,746	37.35%	Gawande Vasanti Shrikant	PWPI	33,988	31.94%	5,758
109	Akot	70.83%	Jagannath Sitaramji Dhone	SS	35,436	35.70%	Gangane Sudhakar Ramkrishna	INC	25,926	26.12%	9,510
110	Borgaon Manju	68.16%	Dalu Gajanan Deorao	SS	44,153	37.87%	Gawai Ramesh Ramrao	BRP	27,098	23.24%	17,055
111	Murtizapur	63.67%	Pawar Makhram Banduji	Independent	31,069	34.63%	Motiram Lahane	BJP	26,033	29.02%	5,036
112	Balapur	66.21%	Kisanrao Babanrao Raut	BJP	39,183	40.88%	Gazi Mohammadali Qaz Mohd. Ibrahimali	AIML	32,870	34.29%	6,313
113	Medshi	66.47%	Zanak Subhash Ramraoji	INC	30,261	34.34%	Gawali Pundlikrao Ramji	SS	21,598	24.51%	8,663
116	Karanja	65.70%	Gawande Gulabrao Ramrao	SS	35,297	40.87%	Babasaheb Dhabekar	INC	25,007	28.95%	10,290
118	Daryapur	68.10%	Prakash Gunvantrao Bharsakale	SS	25,682	27.20%	Deorao Gondaji Wankhade	BRP	16,996	18.00%	8,686
119	Melghat	44.02%	Kale Tulshiram Rupna	INC	28,098	41.66%	Ramesh Raikwar	SS	16,186	24.00%	11,912
120	Achalpur	61.14%	Vinayak Korde	BJP	37,287	38.78%	Babanrao Alias Dattaraya Magorao Metkar	INC	18,476	19.22%	18,811
121	Morshi	68.74%	Harshwardhan Pratapsinha Deshmukh	Independent	38,014	40.77%	Maukar Purushottam Gulab	INC	26,509	28.43%	11,505
122	Teosa	63.82%	Mangle Natthuji Dewaji	CPI	24,459	29.70%	Tasare Sharad Motiram	INC	23,154	28.12%	1,305
123	Walgaon	62.33%	Anil Warhade	INC	20,983	25.48%	Subhash Alias Nanubhau Mahalle	SS	19,373	23.53%	1,610
124	Amravati	57.56%	Jagdish Motilal Gupta	BJP	35,319	32.35%	Pushpatai Vijay Bonde	INC	31,133	28.52%	4,186
125	Badnera	57.95%	Wadnere Pradeep Babanrao	SS	26,224	29.77%	Yate Purushottam Vishnupant	Independent	13,929	15.81%	12,295
126	Chandur	67.49%	Pratap Arunbhau Adsad	BJP	36,201	41.10%	Sherekar Yeshwant Gangaram	INC	23,997	27.25%	12,204
127	Arvi	64.82%	Dr. Sharadrao Kale	INC	37,050	36.02%	Khonde Jyoti Vijayrao	JD	28,444	27.66%	8,606
128	Pulgaon	64.81%	Saroj Ravi Kashikar	JD	37,651	38.65%	Prabha Rau	INC	36,758	37.74%	893
129	Wardha	59.86%	Manik Mahadeo Sabane	Independent	41,604	40.24%	Shande Pramod Bhauraoji	INC	38,126	36.88%	3,478
130	Hinganghat	68.23%	Bonde Vasnat Laxmanrao	JD	40,730	34.33%	Deshmukh Suresh Bapuraoji	INC	36,867	31.08%	3,863
131	Umred	65.91%	Parate Sharwan Govindrao	INC	29,555	29.37%	Itkelwar Vasantrao Balaji	Independent	23,146	23.00%	6,409
132	Kamthi	62.59%	Bhoyar Yadavrao Krushnarao	INC	34,715	33.14%	Radke Deorao Santoshrao	Independent	34,116	32.57%	599
133	Nagpur North	44.72%	Shende Upendra Mangaldas	RPI(K)	33,603	37.30%	Badhel Bhola	BJP	21,358	23.71%	12,245
134	Nagpur East	50.48%	Satish Jhaulal Chaturvedi	INC	80,333	60.34%	Dnyanesh Wakudkar	SS	41,462	31.14%	38,871
135	Nagpur South	55.17%	Dhawad Ashok Shankarrao	INC	35,682	37.20%	Wadibhame Ashok Ramchander	BJP	29,387	30.64%	6,295
136	Nagpur Central	52.88%	Bajirao Yashwant Narayan	JD	22,323	31.54%	Anees Ahmed	INC	22,317	31.53%	6
137	Nagpur West	50.44%	Vinod Gudadhe Patil	BJP	55,081	39.28%	Gev Manchersha Avari	INC	46,438	33.11%	8,643
138	Kalmeshwar	66.76%	Kedar Chhatrapal Anandrao	INC	38,767	37.21%	Gawande Pandurang Narayanrao	Independent	28,348	27.21%	10,419
139	Katol	68.36%	Sunil Shamrao Shinde	INC	37,597	41.87%	Ram Mannalal Neole	JD	25,327	28.20%	12,270
140	Savner	66.72%	Ranjeet Deshmukh	INC	36,410	35.90%	Mangle Dadarao Mahadeorao	BJP	31,873	31.43%	4,537
141	Ramtek	64.67%	Pandurang Jairamji Hajare	JD	43,482	39.83%	Kimmatkar Madhukar Ghanshyamrao	INC	34,525	31.62%	8,957
142	Tumsar	70.01%	Subhashchandra Narayanraoji Karemore	Independent	29,246	31.13%	Ishwardayal Mahipali Patale	JD	19,693	20.96%	9,553
143	Bhandara	66.99%	Aswale Ram Gopal	BJP	29,356	31.35%	Jayant Vasant Vairagade	INC	25,693	27.44%	3,663
144	Adyar	71.33%	Shrungapawar Vilas Vishwanath	Independent	28,091	27.53%	Ramteke Charandas Marotrao	RPI	20,521	20.11%	7,570
145	Tirora	66.85%	More Harish Ukandrao	INC	42,650	45.84%	Binzade Vishnu Barku	BJP	32,743	35.19%	9,907
146	Gondiya	67.05%	Hariharbhai Manibhai Patel	INC	35,856	36.21%	Agarwal Radheshyam Harishchandra (Babli)	BJP	22,995	23.22%	12,861
42	Goregaon	54.54%	Subhash Desai	SS	47,021	40.98%	Sharad Rao	JD	46,426	40.46%	595
148	Amgaon	70.47%	Bahekar Bharatbhau Narayanbhau	INC	41,134	36.55%	Nagpure Bhersinh Dukluji	BJP	28,991	25.76%	12,143
149	Sakoli	74.28%	Dr. Hemkrishna Shamraoji Kapgate	BJP	39,372	36.78%	Badole Janardhan Kisan	Independent	18,646	17.42%	20,726
150	Lakhandur	73.08%	Diwathe Namdeo Harbaji	BJP	40,504	35.02%	Ramchandra Maroti Thakre	INC	32,808	28.37%	7,696
151	Armori	58.08%	Warkhade Hariram Atmaram	SS	36,518	42.94%	Weakey Sukhadeobabu Pundalik	INC	28,681	33.72%	7,837
152	Gadchiroli	60.07%	Marotrao Sainuji Kowase	INC	37,903	43.29%	Kodap Vilas Shamrao	SS	34,800	39.75%	3,103
153	Sironcha	54.20%	Dharamraobaba Bhagwantrao Atram	INC	26,377	36.09%	Atram Raje Satyavanrao Raje Vishveshvarrao	Independent	22,697	31.06%	3,680
154	Rajura	61.95%	Wamanrao Sadashivrao Chatap	JD	47,949	45.52%	Mamulkar Prabhakar Bapurao	INC	37,476	35.57%	10,473
155	Chandrapur	59.78%	Shyam Gopalrao Wankhede	INC	57,622	43.37%	Trivedi Gayacharam Mahaviraprasad	Independent	24,947	18.78%	32,675
156	Saoli	45.26%	Shobha Fadnavis	BJP	49,924	42.95%	Gaddamwar Waman Vistari	INC	36,630	31.51%	13,294
157	Bramhapuri	74.01%	Donadkar Namdeo Bakaram	SS	39,837	33.84%	Deshmukh Shantaram Tulshiramji	Independent	18,905	16.06%	20,932
158	Chimur	72.98%	Waghmare Baburao Jasuji	INC	26,442	22.87%	Jaiswal Baba Alias Yogendra Laximinarayan	SS	24,432	21.13%	2,010
159	Bhadrawati	67.28%	Temurde Moreshwar Vithalrao	JD	34,666	31.04%	Wasade Babasaheb Sonbaji	INC	30,495	27.30%	4,171
160	Wani	64.61%	Wamanrao Kasawar	INC	47,142	50.80%	Guruji D.M.Thawari	SS	19,675	21.20%	27,467
161	Ralegaon	50.39%	Netaji Tanbaji Rajgadkar	JD	33,759	44.85%	Wooike Gulabrao Bajirao	INC	27,334	36.31%	6,425
162	Kelapur	68.54%	Gedam Deorao Jaituji	JD	57,874	62.22%	Shivaji Shioramji Moghe	INC	28,598	30.75%	29,276
163	Yavatmal	59.57%	Jawahar Trimbakrao Deshmukh	JD	30,271	31.85%	Gade Holeshwarrao Tulshiramji	Independent	23,632	24.86%	6,639
164	Darwha	66.92%	Manikrao Govindrao Thakare	INC	26,781	28.75%	Shridhar Dhondabaji Mohod	SS	21,504	23.09%	5,277
165	Digras	63.32%	Pratapsing Ramsing Ade	INC	45,964	47.13%	Yeshwant Wasudeo Upganlawar	SS	24,123	24.73%	21,841
166	Pusad	70.99%	Sudhakarrao Rajusing Naik	INC	59,364	54.01%	Ambhore Shriramsonba	JD	34,088	31.02%	25,276
167	Umarkhed	65.71%	Deosarkar Prakash Patil	JD	47,351	48.45%	Deshmukh Balasaheb Vithalrao	INC	37,586	38.46%	9,765
168	Kinwat	66.06%	Jadhv Subhash Limbaji	CPI	46,449	52.15%	Kishanrao Champatrao Pachpute	INC	28,258	31.73%	18,191
169	Hadgaon	68.19%	Ashtikar Bapurao Shivram Patil	INC	31,739	31.20%	Deshmukh Prataprao Vinayakrao	BJP	25,449	25.02%	6,290
170	Nanded	61.55%	D. R. Deshmukh	SS	48,645	35.13%	Kamalkishor Kadam	INC	33,270	24.02%	15,375
171	Mudkhed	67.90%	Sahebrao Baradkar Deshmukh	INC	31,403	29.40%	Choudhary Ramrao Laxmikantrao	BJP	23,757	22.24%	7,646
172	Bhokar	66.07%	Dr. Madhavrao Bhujangrao Kinhalkar	INC	22,838	23.83%	Kesrale Kishor Bhujangrao	Independent	20,774	21.67%	2,064
173	Biloli	64.71%	Bhaskerrao Bapurao Patil	INC	75,512	58.85%	Patne Gangadher Mahalappa	JD	35,612	27.75%	39,900
174	Mukhed	55.64%	Ghate Madhukarrao Rangoji	INC	40,100	42.15%	Patil Vishwanath Nadhavrao	Independent	22,033	23.16%	18,067
175	Kandhar	60.75%	Keshavrao Shankarrao Dhondge	PWPI	30,195	28.14%	Rohidas Khobraji Chavan	SS	21,815	20.33%	8,380
176	Gangakhed	54.15%	Gaikwad Dnyanoba Hari	PWPI	40,033	50.36%	Ghandant Sitaram Chimaji	BJP	27,216	34.23%	12,817
177	Singnapur	67.74%	Suresh Ambadasrao Warpudkar	INC	58,295	58.56%	Renge Tukaram Ganpatrao	SS	37,882	38.05%	20,413
178	Parbhani	57.69%	Bobde Hanumantrao Daulatrao	SS	49,534	42.04%	Shamim Ahemad Khan Rahim Ahemad Khan	INC	37,966	32.22%	11,568
179	Basmath	66.30%	Dr. Jaiprakash Shankarlal Mundada	SS	54,498	49.77%	Bagal Ramchandra Khobraji	JD	31,959	29.19%	22,539
180	Kalamnuri	65.21%	Maratrao Parasram Shinde	SS	31,615	30.00%	Rajeev Satav	INC	26,924	25.55%	4,691
181	Hingoli	64.50%	Baliram Kotkar Patil	BJP	43,966	41.45%	Patil Sahebrao Narayanrao	INC	32,269	30.42%	11,697
182	Jintur	64.72%	Ramprasad Kadam Bordikar	INC	42,149	42.33%	Ramprasad Wamanrao Bhamble	SS	33,175	33.31%	8,974
183	Pathri	62.60%	Haribhau Vitthalrao Lahane	SS	37,437	42.83%	Dudhgaonker Ganeshrao Nagorao	INC	22,720	25.99%	14,717
184	Partur	64.16%	Akat Vaijanathrao Yadavrao	INC	34,289	35.35%	Yadav Digambar Dattatrayrao	BJP	28,296	29.17%	5,993
185	Ambad	63.76%	Kharat Vilasrao Vithalrao	INC	55,957	51.78%	Paulbudhe Bhausaheb Bapurao	SS	25,735	23.81%	30,222
186	Jalna	58.32%	Arjun Khotkar	SS	57,226	50.49%	Bothra Manikchand Jaichandlal	INC	30,566	26.97%	26,660
187	Badnapur	64.14%	Chavan Narayanrao Satwaji	SS	29,696	28.78%	Appasaheb Sheshrao Chavan	Independent	15,858	15.37%	13,838
188	Bhokardan	69.57%	Raosaheb Danve	BJP	62,684	53.26%	Ranganathrao Shivram Patil	INC	37,174	31.59%	25,510
189	Sillod	65.12%	Manikrao Palodkar Sandu	INC	40,021	42.74%	Kale Gulabrao Laxmanrao	BJP	32,098	34.28%	7,923
190	Kannad	62.37%	Raibhan Rambhaji Jadhav	Independent	34,832	32.81%	Kishor Patil	INC	27,875	26.26%	6,957
191	Vaijapur	68.01%	Ramkrishna Baba Patil	INC	40,305	42.54%	Kailashrao Ramrao Patil	Independent	35,165	37.11%	5,140
192	Gangapur	58.19%	Kailas Patil	SS	43,233	40.58%	Sahebrao Patil Dongaonker	INC	33,024	30.99%	10,209
193	Aurangabad West	58.80%	Chandrakant Khaire	SS	88,964	44.37%	Jawed Hussan Khan Kasim Hussan Khan	Independent	59,809	29.83%	29,155
194	Aurangabad East	59.54%	Haribhau Bagade	BJP	55,581	47.89%	Trimbakrao Ganpatrao Sirasth	INC	43,856	37.78%	11,725
195	Paithan	58.56%	Appasaheb Alias Babanrao Waghchaure	SS	48,273	54.64%	K. P. Zargad (Mamma)	PWPI	16,419	18.58%	31,854
196	Georai	62.30%	Shivajirao Ankushrao	INC	67,770	68.33%	Suryakant Alias Vaijinath Suryabhan Yewle	SS	20,630	20.80%	47,140
197	Majalgaon	58.28%	Patil Radhakrishna	INC	58,209	52.21%	Dak Narayan Govindrao	Independent	21,149	18.97%	37,060
198	Beed	56.86%	Prof. Nawle Suresh Niwrutirao	SS	43,643	40.90%	Jagtap Rajendra Sahebrao	Independent	29,626	27.77%	14,017
199	Ashti	61.15%	Bhimrao Anandrao Dhonde	INC	44,072	39.97%	Darekar Sahebrao Nathuji	JD	41,958	38.06%	2,114
200	Chausala	58.69%	Kshirsagar Jaydatta Sonajirao	INC	51,189	47.49%	Tupe Janardhan Tatyaba	PWPI	26,013	24.13%	25,176
201	Kaij	53.31%	Dr. Vimal Mundada	BJP	35,957	35.72%	Bhagoji Nivruttirao Satpute	INC	26,736	26.56%	9,221
202	Renapur	65.08%	Gopinath Pandurang Munde	BJP	60,275	48.99%	Daund Panditrao Narayan	INC	54,285	44.12%	5,990
203	Ahmedpur	63.27%	Jadhav Balasaheb Kishan Rao	INC	37,492	40.16%	Nagargoje Bhagwanrao Kerbaji	Independent	21,970	23.53%	15,522
204	Udgir	62.10%	Patil Narayanrao Bajirao	JD	39,246	37.36%	Baswaraj Malsetti Patil	INC	38,844	36.98%	402
205	Her	57.39%	Tondchirkar Shivraj Maloji	JD	29,706	37.98%	Dharmaraj Girjappa Sonkawade	INC	23,756	30.38%	5,950
206	Latur	65.24%	Vilasrao Dagadojirao Deshmukh	INC	70,662	49.69%	Gomare Manoharrao Eknathrao	JD	40,102	28.20%	30,560
207	Kalamb	54.95%	Ghodke Kundlik Eknath	PWPI	35,588	42.15%	Yeshwant Pralahadrao Sarwade	Independent	24,839	29.42%	10,749
208	Paranda	66.22%	Anandrao Maharudra Mote	INC	58,912	56.01%	Panditrao Ganpatrao Chede	PWPI	27,941	26.56%	30,971
209	Osmanabad	66.79%	Dr. Padamsinh Bajirao Patil	INC	66,884	61.35%	Gore Arvind Janardhan	JD	34,470	31.62%	32,414
210	Ausa	69.25%	Jadhav Kishanrao Sampatrao	INC	45,272	49.09%	Jadhav Suryabhan Narayanrao	SS	17,102	18.54%	28,170
211	Nilanga	65.00%	Shivajirao Patil Nilangekar	INC	56,312	52.86%	Vishwambharrao Shankarrao Mand	Independent	43,136	40.49%	13,176
212	Omerga	61.85%	Kazi Abdul Khalek A. Kadar	INC	36,277	37.17%	Patil Balbhim Bhaurao	Independent	27,310	27.98%	8,967
213	Tuljapur	68.67%	Madhukarao Deorao Chavan	INC	47,474	52.46%	Khaple Manikrao Bhimrao	PWPI	32,108	35.48%	15,366
214	Akkalkot	66.73%	Patil Mahadeo Kashiraya	INC	43,045	48.40%	Tanawade Babasaheb Sharannappa	BJP	41,213	46.34%	1,832
215	Solapur South	68.48%	Anandrao Narayan Devkate	INC	39,870	43.81%	Patil Sidramappa Malakappa	Independent	34,782	38.22%	5,088
216	Solapur City South	60.39%	Yalgurwar Prakash Balkrishna	INC	31,975	35.34%	Birajdar Patil Shivsharan Hanmantappa	SS	30,884	34.14%	1,091
217	Solapur City North	66.52%	Lingaraj Valyal	BJP	42,059	54.23%	Chakote Baburao Channappa	INC	32,128	41.42%	9,931
218	North Sholapur	61.30%	Sushilkumar Sambhaji Shinde	INC	77,309	61.93%	Chalawade Mallikarjun Shankar	Independent	38,067	30.49%	39,242
219	Mangalwedha	62.22%	Dhobale Laxman Kondiba	INC	49,605	53.45%	Ramesh Dhondapa Shinde	SS	37,307	40.20%	12,298
220	Mohol	71.09%	Nimbalkar Chandrakant Dattaji	PWPI	49,505	51.17%	Shahjiroa Shankarrao Patil	INC	41,098	42.48%	8,407
221	Barshi	64.78%	Dilip Gangadhar Sopal	INC	44,974	49.76%	Deshmukh Krishanarao Nanasaheb	Independent	25,356	28.05%	19,618
222	Madha	66.40%	Pandurang Ganapat Patil	INC	33,510	32.99%	Sathe Dhanaji Ganapatrao	Independent	22,525	22.18%	10,985
223	Pandharpur	64.97%	Sudhakar Ramchandra Paricharak	INC	89,597	76.94%	Patil Prakash Bhivaji	JD	9,751	8.37%	79,846
224	Sangola	74.22%	Ganpatrao Abasaheb Deshmukh	PWPI	72,341	55.40%	Shahajibapu Rajaram Patil	INC	56,023	42.90%	16,318
225	Malshiras	75.35%	Vijaysinh Mohite–Patil	INC	84,747	64.73%	Patil Subhash Balasaheb	BJP	44,445	33.94%	40,302
226	Karmala	65.24%	Jaywantrao Namdeorao Jagtap	Independent	35,762	44.06%	Patil Raosaheb Bhagwanrao	INC	20,670	25.46%	15,092
227	Karjat	56.27%	Bhailume Vittal Sahadu	INC	40,764	48.72%	Lokhande Sadashiv Kisan	BJP	22,015	26.31%	18,749
228	Shrigonda	71.22%	Pachpute Babanrao Bhikaji	JD	52,738	42.90%	Nagwade Shivajirao Narayan	INC	51,920	42.23%	818
229	Ahmednagar South	65.27%	Anil Rathod	SS	42,419	37.72%	Kalamkar Dadabhau Dasarth Rao	INC	31,638	28.13%	10,781
230	Ahmednagar North	64.36%	Shelke Maruti Deoram	INC	63,577	55.09%	Mule Madhavrao Dagduji	JD	32,281	27.97%	31,296
231	Pathardi	60.29%	Rajeev Rajale	INC	46,178	49.25%	Bhapse Baburao Yeshwantrao	JD	41,864	44.65%	4,314
232	Shegaon	70.37%	Tukaram Gangadhar Gadakh	Independent	50,202	47.34%	Ghule Marutrao Shankarrao	INC	44,278	41.76%	5,924
233	Shrirampur	64.66%	Murkute Bhanudas Kashinath	JD	43,993	49.55%	Govindrao Wamanrao Adik	INC	41,139	46.33%	2,854
234	Shirdi	61.00%	Mhaske Annasaheb Sarangdhar	INC	45,886	52.43%	Ghogare Eknath Chandrabhan	JD	28,089	32.10%	17,797
235	Kopargaon	65.33%	Shankarrao Genuji Kolhe	INC	56,673	60.91%	Kale Sambhajirao Kisan	SS	32,801	35.25%	23,872
236	Rahuri	73.67%	Prasadrao Baburao Tanpure	INC	56,590	53.85%	Dhumal Ramdas Vishwanath	BJP	46,674	44.41%	9,916
237	Parner	66.31%	Zaware Nandkumar Bhausaheb	INC	35,657	42.07%	Gaikwad Sabajirao Mahadu	SS	27,350	32.27%	8,307
238	Sangamner	69.73%	Vijay Bhausaheb Thorat	INC	57,465	49.67%	Gunjal Vasantrao Sakharam	BJP	52,603	45.47%	4,862
239	Nagar–Akola	60.89%	Madhukar Pichad	INC	57,446	55.62%	Ashok Yashwant Bhangare	JD	34,539	33.44%	22,907
240	Junnar	66.35%	Vallabh Benke	INC	37,953	36.55%	Gunjal Mahadeo Rakhama Alias Tatyasaheb	JP	27,577	26.56%	10,376
241	Ambegaon	66.07%	Dilip Walse Patil	INC	30,354	36.74%	Patil Shivarajirao Marutrao	Independent	20,809	25.18%	9,545
242	Khed Alandi	61.83%	Narayanrao Baburao Pawar	INC	57,072	56.22%	Takalkar Pratap Genbhau	JD	27,830	27.42%	29,242
243	Maval	66.27%	Bafna Madanlal Harakchand	INC	45,469	41.53%	Bhegde Vishwanath Rambhau	BJP	40,004	36.54%	5,465
244	Mulshi	55.52%	Ashok Namdeorao Mohol	INC	72,834	67.00%	Nandu Ghate	SS	24,965	22.96%	47,869
245	Haveli	51.38%	Landge Dnyaneshwar Pandurang	INC	74,413	36.86%	Nair Rajan Krishna	Independent	47,560	23.56%	26,853
246	Bopodi	53.97%	Rambhau Genba Moze	INC	54,762	66.87%	Patole Balasaheb Shankar	BJP	11,473	14.01%	43,289
247	Shivajinagar	61.03%	Shashikant Sutar	SS	77,297	50.46%	Ankush Kakade	INC	67,637	44.16%	9,660
248	Parvati	55.66%	Sharad Ranpise	INC	66,865	47.34%	Gangurde Vishwas Krishnarao	BJP	56,530	40.02%	10,335
249	Kasba Peth	68.41%	Anna Joshi	BJP	49,152	53.25%	Shantilal Suratwala	INC	42,075	45.58%	7,077
250	Bhavani Peth	57.95%	Dhere Prakash Keshavrao	INC	38,986	42.12%	Kachi Rajan Namdeorao	SS	27,917	30.16%	11,069
251	Pune Cantonment	63.01%	Balasaheb Alias Chandrakant Shivarkar	INC	71,789	53.46%	Vitthal Tupe	JD	49,797	37.08%	21,992
252	Shirur	65.18%	N. N. Alias Bapusaheb Thite	INC	36,499	38.81%	Kakade Sambhaji Sahebrao	JD	26,759	28.45%	9,740
253	Daund	63.11%	Subhash Baburao Kul	Independent	59,982	48.75%	Jagdale Ushadevi Krishnarao	INC	50,194	40.79%	9,788
254	Indapur	67.36%	Ganpatrao Sitaram Patil	INC	62,638	54.24%	More Jagannathrao Marutrao	Independent	29,135	25.23%	33,503
255	Baramati	74.62%	Sharad Pawar	INC	1,02,066	86.89%	Chopade Marutrao Dhondiba	Independent	13,843	11.78%	88,223
256	Purandar	64.24%	Dada Jadhav	JD	56,421	49.37%	Kolate Vijay Vinayak	INC	52,621	46.04%	3,800
257	Bhor	72.32%	Anantrao Thopate	INC	51,653	55.26%	Madhavrao Tapare	Independent	21,429	22.92%	30,224
258	Phaltan	71.38%	Kadam Suryajirao Shankarrao Alais Chimanrao	INC	54,620	48.85%	Shinde Subhashrao Tukaram	Independent	24,915	22.28%	29,705
259	Man	60.29%	Waghmare Dhondiram Ganapati	Independent	38,490	38.95%	Sonavane Vishnu Tatoba	Independent	36,036	36.47%	2,454
260	Khatav	69.99%	Gudage Mohanrao Pandurang	INC	55,481	52.65%	Bagal Arunrao Shivaram	JD	41,150	39.05%	14,331
261	Koregaon	73.10%	Jagtap Shankarrao Chimaji	INC	56,247	53.66%	Dr. Shalini Patil	JD	44,688	42.63%	11,559
262	Wai	72.73%	Madanrao Prataprao Pisal	INC	36,680	38.76%	Laxmanrao Pandurang Jadhav Patil	Independent	21,713	22.94%	14,967
263	Jaoli	64.19%	Kadam Genuji Govind	INC	46,383	44.58%	Sapkal Sadashiv Pandurang	SS	20,662	19.86%	25,721
264	Satara	69.10%	Abhaysinh Shahumaharaj Bhosale	INC	74,936	64.27%	Bhonsale Rajmata Kalpanarraje Pratapsinh Maharaj	SS	38,783	33.26%	36,153
265	Patan	74.38%	Vikramsinh Ranjitsinh Patankar	INC	62,647	59.36%	Desai Viajyadevi Shivajirao	Independent	40,003	37.90%	22,644
266	Karad North	66.09%	Ashtekar Shyam Alias Janardan Balkrishna	INC	58,243	51.79%	Babasaheb Chorekar	Independent	28,014	24.91%	30,229
267	Karad South	70.25%	Vilasrao Balkrishna Patil	INC	64,100	56.92%	Mohite Indrajit Yeshwantrao	Independent	32,643	28.99%	31,457
268	Shirala	74.09%	Shivajirao Bapusaheb Deshmukh	INC	56,404	50.10%	Fattesing Anandrao Naik	Independent	32,938	29.26%	23,466
269	Walva	80.10%	Jayant Rajaram Patil	INC	81,018	60.12%	Shinde Vilasrao Bhauso	Independent	48,459	35.96%	32,559
270	Bhilwadi Wangi	75.86%	Patangrao Kadam	INC	64,665	55.17%	Lad Ganpati Dada	CPI	49,738	42.44%	14,927
271	Sangli	70.20%	Sambhaji Pawar	JD	60,856	53.11%	Vishwanathrao Shamrao Patil	INC	50,843	44.37%	10,013
272	Miraj	64.92%	Patil Sharad Ramgonda	JD	50,014	48.54%	Shinde Mohanrao Alias Ramsing Ganpatrao	INC	44,451	43.14%	5,563
273	Tasgaon	72.58%	Raosaheb Ramrao Patil	INC	56,254	57.93%	Dasharath Maruti Alias D.M. Patil	Independent	23,699	24.40%	32,555
274	Khanapur Atpadi	68.33%	Anil Babar	INC	60,383	55.21%	Patil Hanmantrao Yashavantrao	Independent	35,116	32.11%	25,267
275	Kavathe Mahankal	72.05%	Shivajirao Krishnaji Shendge	INC	48,962	45.21%	Ajitrao Shankarrao Ghorpade	Independent	45,474	41.99%	3,488
276	Jat	57.39%	Sanamadikar Umaji Dhanappa	Independent	41,054	48.98%	Adsul Anandrao Vithoba	SS	20,479	24.43%	20,575
277	Shirol	77.86%	Dr. Ratnappa Bharamappa Kumbhar	INC	71,081	52.62%	Shamgonda Kalgonda Patil	Independent	51,415	38.06%	19,666
278	Ichalkaranji	71.28%	K. L. Malabade	CPI(M)	72,600	49.26%	Prakashanna Awade	INC	66,446	45.09%	6,154
279	Vadgaon	54.24%	Avale Jayawant Gangaram	INC	50,445	56.92%	Akaram Shivaram Dabade (Mistri)	SS	20,131	22.72%	30,314
280	Shahuwadi	78.21%	Babasaheb Yeshwantrao Patil Sarudkar	SS	54,223	50.63%	Sanjaysing Jayasingrao Gaikwad	INC	50,334	47.00%	3,889
281	Panhala	71.73%	Yashwant Alias Dada Eknath Patil	INC	59,821	65.36%	Ashokrao Shankarrao Patil	SS	28,837	31.51%	30,984
282	Sangrul	78.80%	Bondre Shripatrao Shankarrao	INC	59,507	52.68%	Patil Anandrao Dnyandey	Independent	24,360	21.57%	35,147
283	Radhanagari	75.53%	Patil Shankar Dhondi	JD	58,803	50.75%	Jadhav Dinkerrao Bhauso	INC	51,090	44.10%	7,713
284	Kolhapur	62.49%	Desai Diliprao Malharrao	SS	35,889	36.03%	Kharade Sakharambapu	INC	28,282	28.40%	7,607
285	Karvir	63.90%	Digvijay Bhauso Khanvilkar	INC	62,417	55.16%	S. R. Patil	Independent	35,404	31.29%	27,013
286	Kagal	81.76%	Sadashivrao Dadoba Mandlik	INC	58,100	52.54%	Ghatage Sanjay Anandrao	JD	51,596	46.66%	6,504
287	Gadhinglaj	74.37%	Shinde Shripatrao Dinkarrao	JD	45,901	44.45%	Krishnarao Rakhamajirao Desai Alias Babasaheb Kupekar	INC	45,227	43.80%	674
288	Chandgad	75.24%	Narsingrao Gurunath Patil	INC	57,826	55.17%	Bharamu Subarao Patil	Independent	34,783	33.19%	23,043
