= Nitin Arjun Pawar =

Indian politician

Nitin Arjun Pawar (born 1969) is an Indian politician from Maharashtra. He is a member of the Maharashtra Legislative Assembly from the Kalwan Assembly constituency which is reserved for Scheduled Tribe community in Nashik District. He won the 2024 Maharashtra Legislative Assembly election representing the Nationalist Congress Party.

== Early life and education ==
Pawar is from Kalwan, Nashik District, Maharashtra. He is the son of Arjun Tulshiram Pawar. He completed his B.A. in 1991 KTHM College, Nashik which is affiliated with Pune University.

== Career ==
Pawar first became an MLA winning the 2019 Maharashtra Legislative Assembly election in the Kalwan Assembly constituency representing the Nationalist Congress Party. He polled 86,877 votes and defeated his nearest rival, Jiva Pandu Gavit of CPM, by a margin of 6,596 votes. He retained his seat in the 2024 Maharashtra Legislative Assembly election again defeating Jiva Pandu Gavit, by a margin of 8,432 votes.

== Electoral performance ==
Election	Constituency	Party	Result	Votes %	Opposition Candidate	Opposition Party	Opposition vote %	Ref
2024	Kalwan	NCP	Won	50.40%	Jiva Pandu Gavit	CPI(M)	46.84%	
2019	Kalwan	NCP	Won	45.03%	Jiva Pandu Gavit	CPI(M)	41.61%	
