= Deola =

Deola Devla
- City
- Location in Maharashtra, India
- Coordinates: 20°29′31″N 74°13′52″E
- Country: India
- State: Maharashtra
- District: Nashik

Government
  - Type: Municipal Council
  - Body: Deola Municipal Council

Population
  - Total: 184,988

Language
  - Official: Marathi
- Time zone: UTC+5:30 (IST)
- PIN: 423102
- Vehicle registration
- Nearest city: Kalwan, Satana, Malegaon, Chandwad
- Lok Sabha constituency: Dindori
- Vidhan Sabha constituency: Chandwad
- MLA: Dr. Rahul Daulatrao Aher, BJP

Deola is a taluka of Nashik district in Maharashtra, India. It is weekly market for surrounding villages. Economy of this town is primarily run on agriculture.

Deola is situated on the confluence of the rivers Kolti and Bhawdi. It comes under Dindori Lok Sabha constituency and Chandwad Vidhan Sabha constituency. The town lies on the State Highway Vinchur-Prakasha SH-07.

Paanch Kandil (City square with five lamps) is located at the centre of the town where citizens hang out during leisure times. Famous eateries and tangy chat shacks line the Paanch kadil chowk. Saraf Bazar (Gold market), Subhash Road, Tilak Road are some of the market places in Deola. Vegetable market lies adjacent to the river bridge.

Recently, in 2015, the town was upgraded from Gram Panchayat to Municipal Council.

== Education ==
The town has notable schools like Karmaveer Ramraoji Aher School & Junior College, Shardadevi Dnyan Vikas Mandir, Tirupati Valley English Medium School, SKD International School.

Up to post graduation level education is available in Deola.

== Public Transportation ==
Buses are frequently available to go to Mumbai, Pune, Nashik and nearby towns.

Apart from buses, private cabs commonly famous as Kali-Peeli (Black & yellow colored cabs) ply to the nearby places like Chandwad, Kalwan, Satana & Malegaon.

== Agricultural produce ==
Onion, tomato, pomegranate, bajra and maize continue to be the major crops grown in Deola. However, farmers are experimenting to encash more money with modern agricultural practices with grapes and sugarcane too.

APMC is market is located in the town for trading agricultural produce.

== Languages ==
Languages to be spoken are Ahirani and Marathi.

Ahirani is a regional lingo derived from Marathi and Gujarati.
