= Surgana Assembly constituency =

Constituency of the Maharashtra legislative assembly in India

Surgana
- Former constituency for the Maharashtra Legislative Assembly

Constituency details
- Country: India
- Region: Western India
- State: Maharashtra
- Established: 1967
- Abolished: 2008
- Total electors: 1,84,484

Surgana Assembly constituency was an assembly constituency in the India state of Maharashtra.

== Members of the Legislative Assembly ==
Election	Member	Party
1967	Sitaram Savaji Bhoye	Republican Party of India
1972	Arjun Tulashiram Pawar	Bharatiya Kranti Dal
1978	Jiva Pandu Gavit	Communist Party of India
1980	Jiva Pandu Gavit	Communist Party of India
1985	Jiva Pandu Gavit	Communist Party of India
1990	Jiva Pandu Gavit	Communist Party of India
1995	Harischandra Deoram Chavan	Independent politician
1999	Jiva Pandu Gavit	Communist Party of India
2004	Jiva Pandu Gavit	Communist Party of India

== Election results ==
=== Assembly Election 2004 ===
2004 Maharashtra Legislative Assembly election : Surgana
Party	Candidate	Votes	%	±%
CPI(M)	Jiva Pandu Gavit	73,370	53.45%	▲13.77
SS	Gavit Bhaskar Gopal	58,749	42.80%	▲33.30
BSP	Raut Krishna Sitaram	5,128	3.74%	New
Margin of victory		14,621	10.65%	▲0.48
Turnout		1,37,269	74.40%	▲4.68
Registered electors		1,84,484		▲16.65
CPI(M) hold		Swing	▲13.77	

=== Assembly Election 1999 ===
1999 Maharashtra Legislative Assembly election : Surgana
Party	Candidate	Votes	%	±%
CPI(M)	Jiva Pandu Gavit	43,758	39.68%	▲8.86
NCP	Chavan Harischandra Deoram	32,546	29.51%	New
INC	Bhoye Yashwant Mahadu	17,377	15.76%	▲6.26
SS	Gavit Bhaskar Gopal	10,478	9.50%	▲7.64
Margin of victory		11,212	10.17%	▼13.77
Turnout		1,10,272	65.86%	▼8.74
Registered electors		1,58,157		▲3.13
CPI(M) gain from Independent		Swing	▼15.08	

=== Assembly Election 1995 ===
1995 Maharashtra Legislative Assembly election : Surgana
Party	Candidate	Votes	%	±%
Independent	Chavan Harischandra Deoram	65,890	54.76%	New
CPI(M)	Jiva Pandu Gavit	37,086	30.82%	▼20.94
INC	Waghere Ananda Gangaram	11,433	9.50%	▼20.65
SS	Raut Pandurang Soma	2,246	1.87%	▼3.59
Margin of victory		28,804	23.94%	▲2.33
Turnout		1,20,329	76.28%	▲21.67
Registered electors		1,53,351		▲13.41
Independent gain from CPI(M)		Swing	▲3.00	

=== Assembly Election 1990 ===
1990 Maharashtra Legislative Assembly election : Surgana
Party	Candidate	Votes	%	±%
CPI(M)	Jiva Pandu Gavit	39,753	51.76%	▲1.99
INC	Bhoye Sitaram Sayaji	23,154	30.15%	▲3.67
Independent	Bhoye Laxman Bhikaji	7,719	10.05%	New
SS	Raut Pandurang Soma	4,192	5.46%	New
Margin of victory		16,599	21.61%	▼1.68
Turnout		76,805	55.62%	▲6.08
Registered electors		1,35,219		▲25.36
CPI(M) hold		Swing	▲1.99	

=== Assembly Election 1985 ===
1985 Maharashtra Legislative Assembly election : Surgana
Party	Candidate	Votes	%	±%
CPI(M)	Jiva Pandu Gavit	27,229	49.77%	▲14.20
INC	Kahandole Zamru Manglu	14,484	26.47%	New
Independent	Bhoye Ramchandra Mukunda	11,848	21.65%	New
Margin of victory		12,745	23.29%	▲19.89
Turnout		54,713	49.66%	▼2.46
Registered electors		1,07,865		▲12.53
CPI(M) hold		Swing	▲14.20	

=== Assembly Election 1980 ===
1980 Maharashtra Legislative Assembly election : Surgana
Party	Candidate	Votes	%	±%
CPI(M)	Jiva Pandu Gavit	18,134	35.57%	▲19.99
INC(I)	Bhoye Sitaram Sayaji	16,400	32.17%	New
INC(U)	Chavan Harischandra Deoram	14,237	27.93%	New
BJP	Kambait Abaji Ragho	593	1.16%	New
Margin of victory		1,734	3.40%	▲2.17
Turnout		50,982	51.50%	▼0.45
Registered electors		95,857		▲6.45
CPI(M) hold		Swing	▲19.99	

=== Assembly Election 1978 ===
1978 Maharashtra Legislative Assembly election : Surgana
Party	Candidate	Votes	%	±%
CPI(M)	Jiva Pandu Gavit	7,527	15.58%	New
Independent	Chavan Harischandra Deoram	6,932	14.35%	New
Independent	Raut Sitaram Mahadu	6,906	14.30%	New
Independent	Patil Namdeo Vithal	4,432	9.18%	New
INC	Bhoye Ramchandra Mukunda	4,251	8.80%	▼15.05
Independent	Mahale Bhiva Raju	4,019	8.32%	New
Independent	Bhusare Arjun Bhavdu	4,005	8.29%	New
Margin of victory		595	1.23%	▼34.97
Turnout		48,302	51.35%	▲10.26
Registered electors		90,048		▲13.61
CPI(M) gain from BKD		Swing	▼44.47	

=== Assembly Election 1972 ===
1972 Maharashtra Legislative Assembly election : Surgana
Party	Candidate	Votes	%	±%
BKD	Arjun Tulashiram Pawar	20,649	60.05%	New
INC	Sitaram Savaji Bhoye	8,201	23.85%	▼0.54
Independent	Ramdas Pandu Bagul	3,845	11.18%	New
Margin of victory		12,448	36.20%	▼7.28
Turnout		34,384	41.25%	▲2.57
Registered electors		79,258		▲21.46
BKD gain from RPI		Swing		

=== Assembly Election 1967 ===
1967 Maharashtra Legislative Assembly election : Surgana
Party	Candidate	Votes	%	±%
RPI	Sitaram Savaji Bhoye	18,076	67.88%	New
INC	A. R. Jadhav	6,496	24.39%	New
Margin of victory		11,580	43.48%	
Turnout		26,631	37.66%	
Registered electors		65,254		
RPI win (new seat)				
