= Kalwan Assembly constituency =

Constituency of the Maharashtra legislative assembly in India

Coordinates: 20.49°N 74.03°E

Kalwan
- Constituency No. 117 for the Maharashtra Legislative Assembly

Constituency details
- Country: India
- Region: Western India
- State: Maharashtra
- District: Nashik
- Lok Sabha constituency: Dindori
- Total electors: 302,178
- Reservation: ST

Member of Legislative Assembly
- 15th Maharashtra Legislative Assembly
- Incumbent Nitin Arjun Pawar
- Party: NCP
- Alliance: NDA
- Elected year: 2024

Kalwan Assembly constituency is one of the 288 Vidhan Sabha (legislative assembly) constituencies of Maharashtra state in western India, located in Nashik district.

== Overview ==
Kalwan is part of the Dindori Lok Sabha constituency along with five other Vidhan Sabha segments, namely Chandwad Assembly constituency, Dindori, Nandgaon, Niphad Assembly constituency and Yeola Assembly constituency .

== Members of Legislative Assembly ==
Year	Member	Party
1962	Dongar Rama More	Indian National Congress
1978	Arjun Pawar	Indian National Congress
1980	Arjun Pawar	Indian National Congress (I)
1985	Kashinath Bahiram	Indian Congress (Socialist)
1990	Arjun Pawar	Bharatiya Janata Party
1995	Arjun Pawar	Bharatiya Janata Party
1999	Arjun Pawar	Nationalist Congress Party
2004	Arjun Pawar	Nationalist Congress Party
2009	Arjun Pawar	Nationalist Congress Party
2014	Jiva Pandu Gavit	Communist Party of India
2019	Nitin Arjun Pawar	Nationalist Congress Party
2024	Nitin Arjun Pawar	Nationalist Congress Party

== Election results ==
=== Assembly Election 2024 ===
2024 Maharashtra Legislative Assembly election : Kalwan
Party	Candidate	Votes	%	±%
NCP	Nitin Arjun Pawar	119,191	50.40%	New
CPI(M)	Jiva Pandu Gavit	110,759	46.84%	▲5.23
Maharashtra Swarajya Party	Ramesh (Dada) Bhika Thorat	2,230	0.94%	New
NOTA	None of the Above	2,176	0.92%	▼0.14
Independent	Nitin Uttam Pawar	1,639	0.69%	New
Margin of victory		8,432	3.57%	▲0.15
Turnout		2,38,646	78.98%	▲6.46
Total valid votes		2,36,470		
Registered electors		3,02,178		▲12.44
NCP gain from NCP		Swing	▲5.38	

=== Assembly Election 2019 ===
2019 Maharashtra Legislative Assembly election : Kalwan
Party	Candidate	Votes	%	±%
NCP	Nitin Arjun Pawar	86,877	45.03%	▲8.66
CPI(M)	Jiva Pandu Gavit	80,281	41.61%	▲2.48
SS	Mohan Navasu Gangurde	23,052	11.95%	▲6.74
NOTA	None of the Above	2,048	1.06%	▲0.12
Margin of victory		6,596	3.42%	▲0.66
Turnout		1,95,061	72.58%	▲0.08
Total valid votes		1,92,946		
Registered electors		2,68,757		▲11.23
NCP gain from CPI(M)		Swing	▲5.90	

=== Assembly Election 2014 ===
2014 Maharashtra Legislative Assembly election : Kalwan
Party	Candidate	Votes	%	±%
CPI(M)	Jiva Pandu Gavit	67,795	39.13%	▼0.41
NCP	Arjun Tulshiram Pawar	63,009	36.37%	▼14.23
BJP	Gavali Yashwant Laxman	25,457	14.69%	New
SS	Waghmare Bharat Laxman	9,024	5.21%	▼2.02
INC	Gangurde Dhanraj Krishna	5,699	3.29%	New
NOTA	None of the Above	1,623	0.94%	New
BSP	Khotare Tulshiram Chiman	1,395	0.81%	▼0.10
Margin of victory		4,786	2.76%	▼8.29
Turnout		1,74,890	72.38%	▲1.82
Total valid votes		1,73,266		
Registered electors		2,41,613		▲14.85
CPI(M) gain from NCP		Swing	▼11.47	

=== Assembly Election 2009 ===
2009 Maharashtra Legislative Assembly election : Kalwan
Party	Candidate	Votes	%	±%
NCP	Arjun Tulshiram Pawar	74,388	50.59%	▼8.79
CPI(M)	Jiva Pandu Gavit	58,135	39.54%	New
SS	Dhoom Yadav Pandu	10,628	7.23%	New
Independent	Pawar Haribhau Kalu	2,541	1.73%	New
BSP	Ambekar Dadaji Mhalu	1,335	0.91%	▼0.85
Margin of victory		16,253	11.05%	▼12.26
Turnout		1,47,061	69.91%	▲6.41
Total valid votes		1,47,027		
Registered electors		2,10,368		▲5.83
NCP hold		Swing	▼8.79	

=== Assembly Election 2004 ===
2004 Maharashtra Legislative Assembly election : Kalwan
Party	Candidate	Votes	%	±%
NCP	Arjun Tulshiram Pawar	74,938	59.39%	▲16.40
BJP	Gangurde Dhanraj Krishna	45,514	36.07%	▲3.82
Independent	Pawar Yuvraj Sukaram	3,523	2.79%	New
BSP	Pawar Prakash Karbhari	2,213	1.75%	New
Margin of victory		29,424	23.32%	▲12.58
Turnout		1,26,195	63.48%	▲4.23
Total valid votes		1,26,188		
Registered electors		1,98,783		▲20.07
NCP hold		Swing	▲16.40	

=== Assembly Election 1999 ===
1999 Maharashtra Legislative Assembly election : Kalwan
Party	Candidate	Votes	%	±%
NCP	Arjun Tulshiram Pawar	42,165	42.99%	New
BJP	Gangurde Dhanraj Krishna	31,629	32.25%	▼8.28
INC	Bahiram Popat Motiram	24,065	24.53%	▼10.42
Margin of victory		10,536	10.74%	▲5.17
Turnout		1,03,933	62.78%	▼12.05
Total valid votes		98,087		
Registered electors		1,65,550		▼0.13
NCP gain from BJP		Swing	▲2.46	

=== Assembly Election 1995 ===
1995 Maharashtra Legislative Assembly election : Kalwan
Party	Candidate	Votes	%	±%
BJP	Arjun Tulshiram Pawar	47,896	40.52%	▼18.63
INC	Bahiram Popat Motiram	41,311	34.95%	▼0.99
Independent	Bagul Sitabai Baliram	23,631	19.99%	New
Independent	Sonawane Kailas Harishchandra	2,985	2.53%	New
Independent	Pawar Dharma Bhimji	1,749	1.48%	New
Margin of victory		6,585	5.57%	▼17.64
Turnout		1,23,610	74.57%	▲12.41
Total valid votes		1,18,194		
Registered electors		1,65,773		▲16.63
BJP hold		Swing	▼18.63	

=== Assembly Election 1990 ===
1990 Maharashtra Legislative Assembly election : Kalwan
Party	Candidate	Votes	%	±%
BJP	Arjun Tulshiram Pawar	49,516	59.15%	New
INC	Bahiram Kashinath Narayan	30,088	35.94%	▼11.73
CPI	Bhoye Subash Motiram	3,471	4.15%	New
Independent	Bagul Ramchandra Yewaji	631	0.75%	New
Margin of victory		19,428	23.21%	▲19.08
Turnout		85,658	60.26%	▼5.77
Total valid votes		83,706		
Registered electors		1,42,141		▲25.59
BJP gain from IC(S)		Swing	▲7.35	

=== Assembly Election 1985 ===
1985 Maharashtra Legislative Assembly election : Kalwan
Party	Candidate	Votes	%	±%
IC(S)	Bahiram Kashinath Narayan	37,906	51.80%	New
INC	Pawar Arjun Tulshiram	34,882	47.67%	New
Margin of victory		3,024	4.13%	▼44.38
Turnout		75,119	66.37%	▲24.68
Total valid votes		73,174		
Registered electors		1,13,176		▲8.40
IC(S) gain from INC(I)		Swing	▼21.26	

=== Assembly Election 1980 ===
1980 Maharashtra Legislative Assembly election : Kalwan
Party	Candidate	Votes	%	±%
INC(I)	Arjun Tulshiram Pawar	30,490	73.06%	▲53.60
Independent	Gangurde Ramchandra Hanumanta	10,245	24.55%	New
Independent	Pawar Mahadu Lasu	995	2.38%	New
Margin of victory		20,245	48.51%	▲12.39
Turnout		42,875	41.07%	▼15.66
Total valid votes		41,730		
Registered electors		1,04,403		▲8.51
INC(I) gain from INC		Swing	▲14.74	

=== Assembly Election 1978 ===
1978 Maharashtra Legislative Assembly election : Kalwan
Party	Candidate	Votes	%	±%
INC	Arjun Tulshiram Pawar	31,218	58.33%	▲15.08
JP	Bagul Babulal Hiraji	11,885	22.21%	New
INC(I)	Jadhav Ambuji Rambhau	10,418	19.47%	New
Margin of victory		19,333	36.12%	▲10.12
Turnout		55,660	57.85%	▲19.75
Total valid votes		53,521		
Registered electors		96,211		▲27.72
INC hold		Swing	▲15.08	

=== Assembly Election 1962 ===
1962 Maharashtra Legislative Assembly election : Kalwan
Party	Candidate	Votes	%	±%
INC	Dongar Rama More	11,689	43.24%	New
Independent	Ramdan Pandu Bagul	4,660	17.24%	New
CPI	Yewaji Kashiram Gawit	4,516	16.71%	New
Independent	Ambu Rambhau Jadhav	3,884	14.37%	New
PSP	Kalu Mahadu Nikam	2,281	8.44%	New
Margin of victory		7,029	26.00%	
Turnout		29,894	39.68%	
Total valid votes		27,030		
Registered electors		75,331		
INC win (new seat)				

== See also ==
- Kalwan
- List of constituencies of Maharashtra Vidhan Sabha
