= Bharati Pawar =

Union State Minister for Health and Family Welfare, Member of Parliament (Lok Sabha)

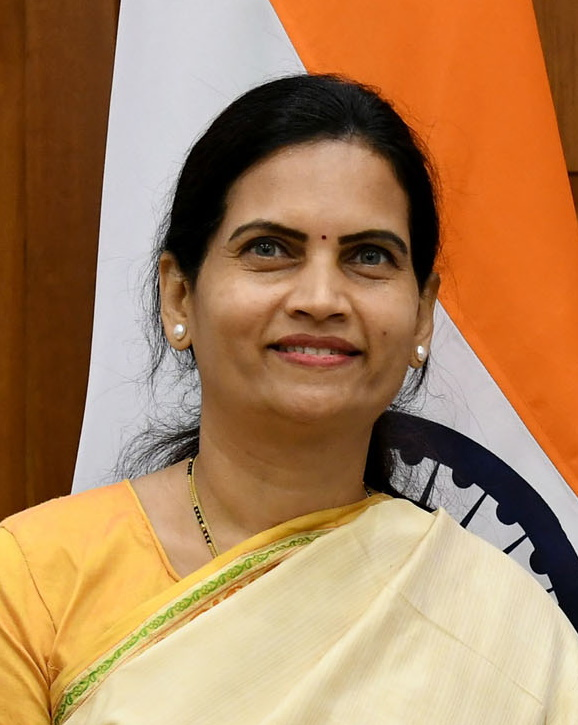
- Official portrait, 2021

Union Minister of State for Health and Family Welfare
- In office 7 July 2021 – 10 June 2024 Serving with S. P. Singh Baghel
- Minister: Mansukh L. Mandaviya
- Preceded by: Ashwini Kumar Choubey
- Succeeded by: Anupriya Patel

Union Minister of State for Tribal Affairs
- In office 7 December 2023 – 10 June 2024 Serving with Bishweswar Tudu
- Minister: Arjun Munda
- Preceded by: Renuka Singh
- Succeeded by: Durga Das Uikey

Member of Parliament, Lok Sabha
- In office 23 May 2019 – 4 June 2024
- Preceded by: Harishchandra Chavan
- Succeeded by: Bhaskar Bhagare
- Constituency: Dindori, Maharashtra

Personal details
- Born: 13 September 1978 (age 47) Narul, Maharashtra, India
- Party: Bharatiya Janata Party
- Other political affiliations: Nationalist Congress Party
- Spouse: Pravin Arjun Pawar (m. 2002)
- Relations: A.T.Pawar (father in-law); Nitin Arjun Pawar (brother in-law)
- Education: M.B.B.S.
- Alma mater: Pune University
- Occupation: Politician

Bharati Pravin Pawar is an Indian politician. She served as the Minister of State for Health and Family Welfare of India from 7 July 2021 to 11 June 2024 and Minister of State for Tribal Affairs from 7 December 2023 to 11 June 2024. She was elected to the 17th Lok Sabha, lower house of the Parliament of India from Dindori Loksabha Constituency, Maharashtra in the 2019 Indian general election as member of the Bharatiya Janata Party.

She has been awarded Best Woman Parliamentarian in December 2019 - by Lokmat Media Group.

== Early life ==
Bharti Pawar was born on 13 September 1978 in Narul-Kalwan, Adivasi region of Nashik, Maharashtra. She is married to Pravin Pawar.

She is the daughter in law of former minister Arjun Tulshiram Pawar.

== Education ==
Pawar earned MBBS in 2002 from N.D.M.V.P's Medical College, Nashik.

== Political career ==
Bharti started her career as a Member of Zilla Parishad. She contested Lok Sabha election in 2014 as a Nationalist Congress Party candidate and was defeated by Bharatiya Janata Party candidate. She requested candidacy again in 2019 but her request was declined by Nationalist Congress Party. She joined the BJP in 2019. She won the election after joining Bharatiya Janata Party.

Her father-in-law was 8 time MLA from same region and served as minister of state for tribal welfare in the First Deshmukh ministry of Government of Maharashtra.

=== Positions held ===
- Member, Zilla Parishad (2012 - 2019)
- Member of Parliament, 17th Lok Sabha (2019 - incumbent)
- Member, Standing Committee on Health and Family Welfare (2019 - incumbent)
- Member, Committee on Petitions (2019 - incumbent)
- Member, Consultative Committee, Ministry of Skill Development and Entrepreneurship (2019 - incumbent)
- Minister of State in the Ministry of Health and Family Welfare (July 2021 - incumbent)

She became union minister from Nashik region after 59 years. She is also the first female union minister from Nashik.

== Awards ==
- Best Woman Parliamentarian (2019) - by Lokmat Media Group
