= Bhaskar Bhagare =

Indian politician

Bhaskar Murlidhar Bhagare
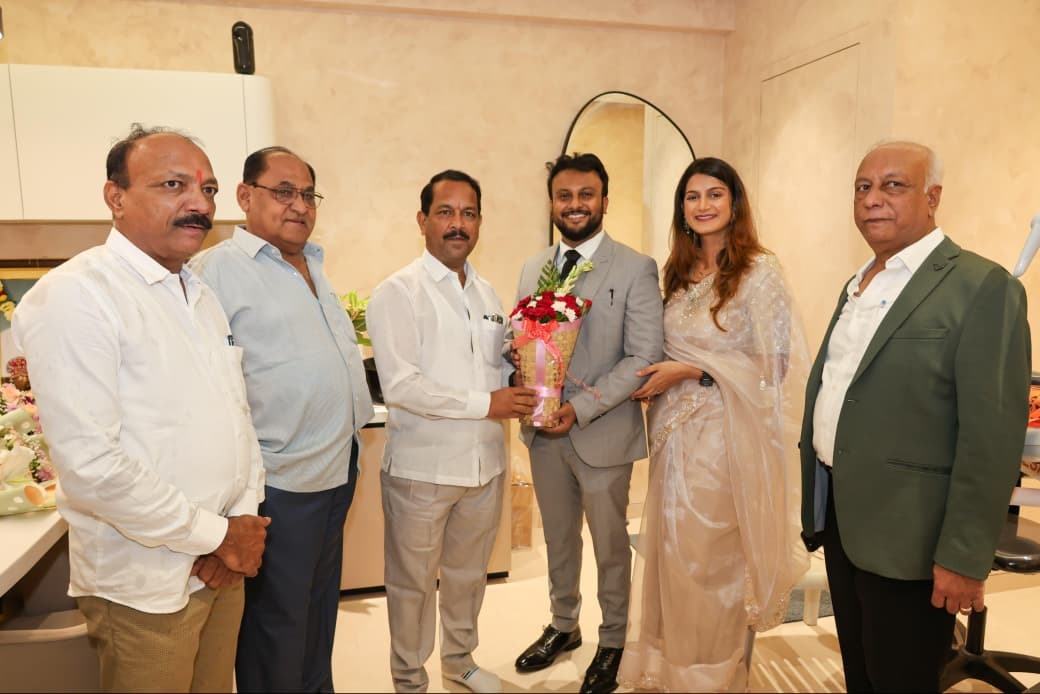
- Sir (3rd from the left) inaugurating the Orizen dental clinic

Member of Parliament, Lok Sabha
- Incumbent
- Assumed office 2024
- Preceded by: Bharati Pawar
- Constituency: Dindori

Personal details
- Born: Bhaskar Murlidhar Bhagare; 1971 (age 54–55) Dindori, Dindori district, Maharashtra, India, Asia
- Citizenship: Indian
- Party: NCP–SP
- Parent: Murlidhar Bhagare (father)
- Occupation: Politician
- Profession: Agriculturist

Bhaskar Murlidhar Bhagare is an Indian politician, social worker and Member of Parliament, Lok Sabha from Dindori Lok Sabha constituency as a member of Nationalist Congress Party – Sharadchandra Pawar party. In 2024 Indian General Elections, he defeated Bharati Pravin Pawar of Bharatiya Janta Party by a margin of 1,13,199 votes.

== Political career ==
Bhagare has been elected as a Member of Parliament from Dindori Lok Sabha constituency in 2024 Indian general elections.
