= Harischandra Chavan =

Indian politician (1951–2024)

Harischandra Devram Chavan

Member of Parliament, Lok Sabha
- In office 2009–2019
- Preceded by: constituency created
- Succeeded by: Bharati Pawar
- Constituency: Dindori
- In office 2004–2009
- Preceded by: Haribahu Shankar Mahale
- Succeeded by: constituency defunct
- Constituency: Malegaon

Member of Maharashtra Legislative Assembly
- In office 1995–1999
- Preceded by: Jiva Pandu Gavit
- Succeeded by: Jiva Pandu Gavit
- Constituency: Surgana

Personal details
- Born: 25 December 1951; Pratapgad, Nashik district, Bombay State, India
- Died: 14 November 2024 (aged 72)
- Political party: Bharatiya Janata Party
- Spouse: Kalavati (m. 1981)
- Children: 2
- Parents: Devram Chavan (father); Godabai Chavan (mother)
- Education: Bachelor of Arts

Harischandra Devram Chavan (25 December 1951 – 14 November 2024) was an Indian politician who was a member of the 15th Lok Sabha. He represented Dindori constituency in Maharashtra and was a member of the Bharatiya Janata Party (BJP) political party. Chavan was also member of the 14th Lok Sabha of India and represented Malegaon constituency in Maharashtra. He died on 14 November 2024, at the age of 72.
