= Dindori Lok Sabha constituency =

Lok Sabha constituency in Maharashtra

Coordinates: 20.2°N 73.8°E

Dindori Lok Sabha
- Lok Sabha constituency
- Dindori Lok Sabha Constituency map

Constituency details
- Country: India
- Region: Western India
- State: Maharashtra
- Assembly constituencies: Nandgaon; Kalwan; Chandwad; Yevla; Niphad; Dindori
- Established: 2008
- Total electors: 18,53,387
- Reservation: ST

Member of Parliament
- 18th Lok Sabha
- Incumbent Bhaskar Bhagare
- Party: NCP-SP
- Alliance: INDIA
- Elected year: 2024
- Preceded by: Bharati Pawar

Dindori Lok Sabha constituency is one of the 48 Lok Sabha (lower house of Indian parliament) constituencies of Maharashtra state in western India. It is in Nashik district. This constituency was created on 19 February 2008 as a part of the implementation of the Presidential notification based on the recommendations of the Delimitation Commission of India constituted 12 July 2002. The first held elections were in 2009 and its first member of parliament (MP) was Harischandra Devram Chavan of the Bharatiya Janata Party. Bhaskar Bhagare of the NCP(SP) is elected as Member of Parliament in 2024. Now he represents Dindori Loksabha Constituency by defeating BJP Candidate Bharati Pawar.

== Assembly segments ==
Presently, Dindori Lok Sabha constituency comprises six Vidhan Sabha (legislative assembly) segments. These segments are:

Constituency number	Name	Reserved for (SC/ST/None)	District	Party	2024 Lead
113	Nandgaon	None	Nashik	SHS	BJP
117	Kalwan	ST	Nashik	NCP	NCP-SP
118	Chandwad	None	Nashik	BJP	BJP
119	Yevla	None	Nashik	NCP	NCP-SP
121	Niphad	None	Nashik	NCP	NCP-SP
122	Dindori	ST	Nashik	NCP	NCP-SP

== Members of Parliament ==
Year	Name	Party
2009	Harishchandra Chavan	Bharatiya Janata Party
2014	Harishchandra Chavan	Bharatiya Janata Party
2019	Bharati Pawar	Bharatiya Janata Party
2024	Bhaskar Bhagare	Nationalist Congress Party - Sharadchandra Pawar

== Election results ==
=== 2024 ===
2024 Indian general elections: Dindori
Party	Candidate	Votes	%	±%
NCP-SP	Bhaskar Murlidhar Bhagare	577,339	46.53	New
BJP	Bharati Pawar	4,64,140	37.40	▼12.48
Independent	Babu Sadu Bhagare	1,03,632	8.35	N/A
VBA	Dhomse Malati Rahul	37,103	2.99	▼2.18
Independent	Jagtap Dipak Ganpat	15,681	1.26	N/A
BSP	Tulshiram Chiman Khotare	9,654	0.78	N/A
NOTA	None of the Above	8,246	0.66	▼0.17
Majority		1,13,199	9.12	▼8.35
Turnout		12,40,910	66.95	▲1.24
NCP-SP gain from BJP		Swing		

=== 2019 ===
2019 Indian general elections: Dindori
Party	Candidate	Votes	%	±%
BJP	Bharati Pawar	567,470	49.88	
NCP	Dhanraj Mahale	3,68,691	32.41	
CPI(M)	Jiva Pandu Gavit	1,09,570	9.63	
VBA	Bapu Barde	58,847	5.17	
NOTA	None of the Above	9,446	0.83	
Majority		1,98,779	17.47	
Turnout		11,38,702	65.71	
BJP hold		Swing		

=== General elections 2014 ===
2014 Indian general elections: Dindori
Party	Candidate	Votes	%	±%
BJP	Harischandra Devram Chavan	542,784	55.95	+14.69
NCP	Bharati Pawar	2,95,165	30.42	−5.36
CPI(M)	Hemant Motiram Waghere	72,599	7.48	−7.98
BSP	Mali Sharad Sahebrao	17,724	1.83	−0.80
Independent	Gaikwad Abhijeet Kalyanrao	10,267	1.06	N/A
BBM	Prabhat Chindhu Sonawane	10,578	0.57	−0.42
Independent	Ajitdada Bhika Pawar	5,177	0.53	N/A
AAP	Dnyaneshwar Damu Mali	4,067	0.42	N/A
Independent	Kailas Sakharam More	3,900	0.40	N/A
BMP	Bharat Kisan Mate	2,024	0.21	N/A
NOTA	None of the above	10,897	1.12	N/A
Margin of victory		2,47,619	25.53	+20.05
Turnout		9,70,182	63.40	+15.83
BJP hold		Swing	+10.03	

=== General elections 2009 ===
2009 Indian general elections: Dindori
Party	Candidate	Votes	%	±%
BJP	Harischandra Devram Chavan	281,254	41.26	N/A
NCP	Narhari Sitaram Zirwal	2,43,907	35.78	N/A
CPI(M)	Jeeva Pandu Gavit	1,05,352	15.46	N/A
BSP	Gangurde Dipak Shankar	17,902	2.63	N/A
Independent	Shankar Deoram Gangurde	11,372	1.67	N/A
Independent	Gangurde Balu Kisan	6,957	1.02	N/A
BBM	Pawar Sampat Waman	6,717	0.99	N/A
Independent	Bhika Harsing Barde	4,649	0.68	N/A
Independent	Vijay Namdeo Pawar	3,513	0.52	N/A
Margin of victory		37,347	5.48	N/A
Turnout		6,81,623	47.57	N/A
BJP win (new seat)				

== See also ==
- Malegaon Lok Sabha constituency
- Nashik district
- List of constituencies of the Lok Sabha
