= Chandwad Assembly constituency =

Constituency of the Maharashtra legislative assembly in India

Coordinates: 20.33°N 74.24°E

Chandvad
- Constituency No. 118 for the Maharashtra Legislative Assembly
- Rahul Aher, present MLA of Chandvad

Constituency details
- Country: India
- Region: Western India
- State: Maharashtra
- District: Nashik
- Lok Sabha constituency: Dindori
- Total electors: 309,931
- Reservation: None

Member of Legislative Assembly
- 15th Maharashtra Legislative Assembly
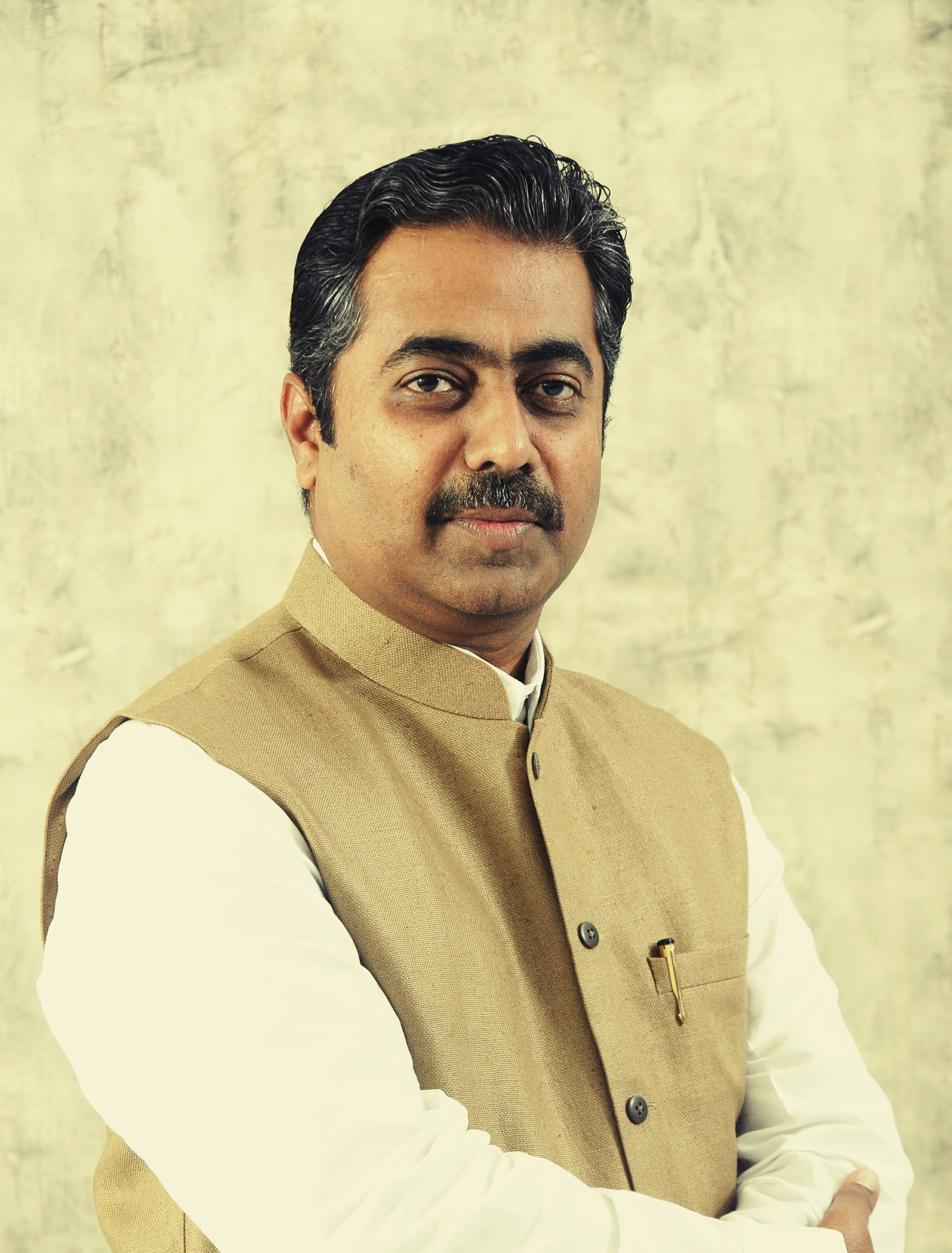
- Incumbent Rahul Daulatrao Aher
- Party: BJP
- Alliance: NDA
- Elected year: 2024

Chandwad Assembly constituency is one of the 288 Vidhan Sabha (legislative assembly) constituencies of Maharashtra state in western India.

== Overview ==
Chandwad is part of the Dindori Lok Sabha constituency along with five other Vidhan Sabha segments, namely Dindori, Kalvan Assembly constituency, Nandgaon, Niphad Assembly constituency and Yeola Assembly constituency.

== Members of the Legislative Assembly ==
Year	Member	Party
1978	Kisanrao Dawakhar	Janata Party
1980	Kashiram Gaikwad	Indian National Congress
1985	Jaychand Kasliwal	Bharatiya Janata Party
1990	Jaychand Kasliwal	Bharatiya Janata Party
1995	Jaychand Kasliwal	Bharatiya Janata Party
1999	Shirishkumar Kotwal	Nationalist Congress Party
2004	Uttam Bhalerao	Nationalist Congress Party
2009	Shirishkumar Kotwal	Independent
2014	Rahul Aher	Bharatiya Janata Party
2019	Rahul Aher	Bharatiya Janata Party
2024	Rahul Aher	Bharatiya Janata Party

== Election results ==
=== Assembly Election 2024 ===
2024 Maharashtra Legislative Assembly election : Chandwad
Party	Candidate	Votes	%	±%
BJP	Dr. Rahul Daulatrao Aher	104,826	43.86%	▼10.19
PHJSP	Ganesh Ramesh Nimbalkar	55,865	23.37%	New
Independent	Keda (Nana) Tanaji Aher	48,724	20.38%	New
INC	Shirishkumar Vasantrao Kotwal	23,335	9.76%	▼29.79
VBA	Santosh Namdev Kedare	2,602	1.09%	New
NOTA	None of the Above	424	0.18%	▼0.45
Margin of victory		48,961	20.48%	▲5.99
Turnout		2,39,449	77.26%	▲8.52
Total valid votes		2,39,025		
Registered electors		3,09,931		▲11.07
BJP hold		Swing	▼10.19	

=== Assembly Election 2019 ===
2019 Maharashtra Legislative Assembly election : Chandwad
Party	Candidate	Votes	%	±%
BJP	Dr. Rahul Daulatrao Aher	103,454	54.04%	▲24.02
INC	Shirishkumar Vasantrao Kotwal	75,710	39.55%	▲15.62
Independent	Sanjay Waman Kedare	5,780	3.02%	New
Independent	Sunil (Gotu Aaba) Parashram Aher	2,440	1.27%	New
CPI	Adv. Dattatray Ramchandra Gangurde	2,418	1.26%	▼0.56
NOTA	None of the Above	1,196	0.62%	▲0.17
Margin of victory		27,744	14.49%	▲8.39
Turnout		1,92,632	69.03%	▼3.09
Total valid votes		1,91,432		
Registered electors		2,79,047		▲9.32
BJP hold		Swing	▲24.02	

=== Assembly Election 2014 ===
2014 Maharashtra Legislative Assembly election : Chandwad
Party	Candidate	Votes	%	±%
BJP	Dr. Rahul Daulatrao Aher	54,946	30.03%	▲7.09
INC	Shirishkumar Vasantrao Kotwal	43,785	23.93%	New
Independent	Dr. Atmaram Popat Narayan	29,409	16.07%	New
NCP	Uttam Ganpat Bhalerao	27,295	14.92%	▼9.97
SS	Aher Nitin Raghunath	19,032	10.40%	New
CPI	Dattu Ramchandra Gangurde	3,327	1.82%	New
Independent	Ashok Bhivaji Hire	2,178	1.19%	New
NOTA	None of the Above	836	0.46%	New
Margin of victory		11,161	6.10%	▼5.48
Turnout		1,84,254	72.19%	▲4.95
Total valid votes		1,82,992		
Registered electors		2,55,252		▲7.76
BJP gain from Independent		Swing	▼6.44	

=== Assembly Election 2009 ===
2009 Maharashtra Legislative Assembly election : Chandwad
Party	Candidate	Votes	%	±%
Independent	Shirishkumar Vasantrao Kotwal	57,655	36.47%	New
NCP	Bhalerao Uttam (Baba) Ganpat	39,345	24.89%	▼13.59
BJP	Aher Arun Dadaji	36,261	22.94%	New
MNS	Jadhav Shashikant Haribhau	15,448	9.77%	New
Independent	Laxmibai Narayan Shewale	2,496	1.58%	New
SWP	Rakibe Arvind Damodhar	2,348	1.49%	New
Independent	Dr. Kotwal Dattatraya Madhavrao	1,634	1.03%	New
Margin of victory		18,310	11.58%	▲5.19
Turnout		1,58,131	66.76%	▼3.89
Total valid votes		1,58,083		
Registered electors		2,36,866		▲26.32
Independent gain from NCP		Swing	▼2.00	

=== Assembly Election 2004 ===
2004 Maharashtra Legislative Assembly election : Chandwad
Party	Candidate	Votes	%	±%
NCP	Uttam Ganpat Bhalerao	50,953	38.48%	▼20.27
SS	Shirishkumar Vasantrao Kotwal	42,485	32.08%	New
Independent	Pawar Ratnakar Dnyandeo	31,522	23.80%	New
BSP	Kotwal Dinkar Gangadhar	2,479	1.87%	New
Independent	Hire Ashok Bhivaji	1,851	1.40%	New
LJP	Gangurde Rajendra Laxman	1,363	1.03%	New
Independent	Lata Bhika Barde	1,191	0.90%	New
Margin of victory		8,468	6.39%	▼14.55
Turnout		1,32,443	70.63%	▲4.59
Total valid votes		1,32,431		
Registered electors		1,87,511		▲18.59
NCP hold		Swing	▼20.27	

=== Assembly Election 1999 ===
1999 Maharashtra Legislative Assembly election : Chandwad
Party	Candidate	Votes	%	±%
NCP	Shirishkumar Vasantrao Kotwal	61,333	58.74%	New
BJP	Kasliwal Jaichand Deepchand	39,469	37.80%	▼1.20
INC	Sonawane Madhukar Shankarrao	2,139	2.05%	▼35.41
CPI(M)	Thombare Sitaram Karbhari	1,097	1.05%	New
Margin of victory		21,864	20.94%	▲19.39
Turnout		1,11,435	70.47%	▼7.71
Total valid votes		1,04,413		
Registered electors		1,58,120		▼0.01
NCP gain from BJP		Swing	▲19.74	

=== Assembly Election 1995 ===
1995 Maharashtra Legislative Assembly election : Chandwad
Party	Candidate	Votes	%	±%
BJP	Kasliwal Jaichand Deepchand	45,488	39.00%	▼7.25
INC	Shirishkumar Vasantrao Kotwal	43,683	37.46%	▲3.20
Independent	Gunjal Suresh Dharmaji	6,925	5.94%	New
JD	Pawar Bagurao Fakira	5,426	4.65%	▲2.01
PWPI	Pachorkar Daulat Lukaji	4,443	3.81%	New
Independent	Lonari Vijay Dhondiram	3,328	2.85%	New
Independent	Dr. Kotwal Dattatraya Madhavrao	1,838	1.58%	New
Margin of victory		1,805	1.55%	▼10.45
Turnout		1,19,895	75.82%	▲11.56
Total valid votes		1,16,621		
Registered electors		1,58,134		▲15.12
BJP hold		Swing	▼7.25	

=== Assembly Election 1990 ===
1990 Maharashtra Legislative Assembly election : Chandwad
Party	Candidate	Votes	%	±%
BJP	Kasliwal Jaichand Deepchand	39,514	46.26%	▼0.88
INC	Shirishkumar Vasantrao Kotwal	29,264	34.26%	▼3.28
INS(SCS)	Deore Vishwasrao Namdeo	7,920	9.27%	New
Independent	Madhukaranna Shankarrao Sonawane	3,239	3.79%	New
JD	Gaurav Smitatai Chandrakant	2,259	2.64%	New
Independent	Kedare Navnath Kacharnathswami	1,121	1.31%	New
Independent	Kolhe Ramkrishna Madhavrao	776	0.91%	New
Margin of victory		10,250	12.00%	▲2.40
Turnout		87,466	63.68%	▲6.65
Total valid votes		85,426		
Registered electors		1,37,362		▲21.25
BJP hold		Swing	▼0.88	

=== Assembly Election 1985 ===
1985 Maharashtra Legislative Assembly election : Chandwad
Party	Candidate	Votes	%	±%
BJP	Kasliwal Jaichand Deepchand	29,659	47.14%	New
INC	Gaikwad Narayan Kashiram	23,621	37.54%	New
Independent	Bhulerao Uttam Ganpat	4,410	7.01%	New
Independent	Deore Shivaji Jayaram	2,374	3.77%	New
Independent	Bankar Manohar Tulshiram	895	1.42%	New
Independent	Audhesh Narayan Girjashankar Mishra	670	1.06%	New
Independent	Ahire Kacharu Bhimji	632	1.00%	New
Margin of victory		6,038	9.60%	▲3.97
Turnout		64,345	56.80%	▼2.09
Total valid votes		62,921		
Registered electors		1,13,289		▲10.01
BJP gain from INC(I)		Swing	▲10.02	

=== Assembly Election 1980 ===
1980 Maharashtra Legislative Assembly election : Chandwad
Party	Candidate	Votes	%	±%
INC(I)	Gaikwad Narayan Kashiram	22,027	37.12%	New
INC(U)	Thakare Narhar Karbhari	18,690	31.49%	New
Independent	Deore Gyanandev Tukaram	18,159	30.60%	New
Independent	Chauhan Jagannath Jairam	468	0.79%	New
Margin of victory		3,337	5.62%	▲2.02
Turnout		60,670	58.91%	▼10.67
Total valid votes		59,344		
Registered electors		1,02,980		▲8.59
INC(I) gain from JP		Swing	▲1.35	

=== Assembly Election 1978 ===
1978 Maharashtra Legislative Assembly election : Chandwad
Party	Candidate	Votes	%	±%
JP	Dawakhar Kisanrao Damodar	23,168	35.77%	New
RPI	Deore Gyandeo Tukaram	20,836	32.17%	New
Independent	Hiray Vyankatrao Bhausaheb	17,865	27.58%	New
Independent	Pagar Laxman Bhikaji	1,245	1.92%	New
Independent	Aher Kautikrao Malji	873	1.35%	New
Independent	Jadhav Chintaman Rama	782	1.21%	New
Margin of victory		2,332	3.60%	
Turnout		66,416	70.03%	
Total valid votes		64,769		
Registered electors		94,838		
JP win (new seat)				

== See also ==
- Chandwad
- Deola
- List of constituencies of Maharashtra Vidhan Sabha
