= Nandgaon Assembly constituency =

Constituency of the Maharashtra legislative assembly in India

Coordinates: 20.31°N 74.66°E

Nandgaon
- Constituency No. 113 for the Maharashtra Legislative Assembly

Constituency details
- Country: India
- Region: Western India
- State: Maharashtra
- District: Nashik
- Lok Sabha constituency: Dindori
- Established: 1952
- Total electors: 344,436
- Reservation: None

Member of Legislative Assembly
- 15th Maharashtra Legislative Assembly
- Incumbent Suhas Dwarkanath Kande
- Party: SHS
- Alliance: NDA
- Elected year: 2024

Nandgaon Assembly constituency is one of the fifteen constituencies of the Maharashtra Vidhan Sabha located in Nashik district.

== Overview ==
It is a part of the Dindori Lok Sabha constituency (ST) along with five other assembly constituencies, viz Chandwad Assembly constituency, Dindori, Kalvan, Niphad Assembly constituency and Yeola Assembly constituency.

== Members of the Legislative Assembly ==
Year	Member	Party
1952	Punjabrao Bapurao Yawalikar	Indian National Congress
1957	Hiray Bhausahib Sakharam	Indian National Congress
1962	Bhausaheb Hire	Indian National Congress
1967	Shivram Hire	Samyukta Socialist Party
1972	Hirubhau Gawli	Indian National Congress
1978	Kanhaiyalal Nahar	Independent
1980	Jagannath Dhatrak	Indian National Congress (I)
1985	Madhavrao Gaikwad	Communist Party of India
1990	Jagannath Dhatrak	Indian National Congress
1995	Rajendra Deshmukh	Shiv Sena
1999	Anilkumar Aher	Indian National Congress
2004	Sanjay Pawar	Shiv Sena
2009	Pankaj Bhujbal	Nationalist Congress Party
2014	Pankaj Bhujbal	Nationalist Congress Party
2019	Suhas Kande	Shiv Sena
2024	Suhas Kande	Shiv Sena

== Election results ==
=== Assembly Election 2024 ===
2024 Maharashtra Legislative Assembly election : Nandgaon
Party	Candidate	Votes	%	±%
SS	Suhas Dwarkanath Kande	138,068	56.66%	▲11.51
Independent	Bhujbal Sameer	48,194	19.78%	New
Independent	Dr. Rohan Nimbaji Borse	28,108	11.54%	New
SS(UBT)	Ganesh Jagannath Dhatrak	22,120	9.08%	New
VBA	Anand Suresh Shingare	2,154	0.88%	▼6.34
NOTA	None of the above	775	0.32%	▼0.35
Margin of victory		89,874	36.88%	▲29.53
Turnout		244,448	70.97%	▲11.06
Total valid votes		243,673		
Registered electors		344,436		▲8.52
SS hold		Swing	▲11.51	

=== Assembly Election 2019 ===
2019 Maharashtra Legislative Assembly election : Nandgaon
Party	Candidate	Votes	%	±%
SS	Suhas Dwarkanath Kande	85,275	45.15%	▲19.69
NCP	Pankaj Bhujbal	71,386	37.79%	▲3.10
VBA	Pagare Rajendra. D	13,637	7.22%	New
Independent	Engg. Ratnakar Dnyandev Pawar	12,257	6.49%	New
NOTA	None of the above	1,264	0.67%	▼0.05
Margin of victory		13,889	7.35%	▼1.88
Turnout		190,148	59.91%	▼7.85
Total valid votes		188,878		
Registered electors		317,388		▲6.92
SS gain from NCP		Swing	▲10.46	

=== Assembly Election 2014 ===
2014 Maharashtra Legislative Assembly election : Nandgaon
Party	Candidate	Votes	%	±%
NCP	Pankaj Bhujbal	69,263	34.69%	▼18.64
SS	Suhas Dwarkanath Kande	50,827	25.46%	▼16.03
BJP	Hiray -Patil Advay Prashant	50,351	25.22%	New
INC	Aher Anilkumar Gangadhar	16,464	8.25%	New
MNS	Adv. Sanap Jayant Shivaji	3,185	1.60%	▼0.06
CPI	Sanjay Babanrao Sanap	1,942	0.97%	New
Independent	Shantaram Dashrath Desai	1,748	0.88%	New
BSP	Suraj Bhimrao Gaikwad	1,629	0.82%	▼0.44
NOTA	None of the above	1,435	0.72%	New
Margin of victory		18,436	9.23%	▼2.60
Turnout		201,134	67.76%	▲3.96
Total valid votes		199,637		
Registered electors		296,834		▲4.82
NCP hold		Swing	▼18.64	

=== Assembly Election 2009 ===
2009 Maharashtra Legislative Assembly election : Nandgaon
Party	Candidate	Votes	%	±%
NCP	Pankaj Bhujbal	96,292	53.33%	New
SS	Pawar Sanjay Sayaji	74,923	41.49%	▲4.26
MNS	Pankaj Ramchandra Khatal	3,003	1.66%	New
BSP	Gaikwad Suraj Bhimrao	2,269	1.26%	▼0.11
Independent	Sachin Bhaskar More	1,570	0.87%	New
Shivrajya Party	Amrale Gorakh Ragho	1,423	0.79%	New
Hindustan Janta Party	Shewale Sandip Jibhau	1,084	0.60%	New
Margin of victory		21,369	11.83%	▲6.39
Turnout		180,652	63.80%	▼1.36
Total valid votes		180,564		
Registered electors		283,173		▲35.25
NCP gain from SS		Swing	▲16.10	

=== Assembly Election 2004 ===
2004 Maharashtra Legislative Assembly election : Nandgaon
Party	Candidate	Votes	%	±%
SS	Pawar Sanjay Sayaji	50,783	37.23%	▲17.16
INC	Aher Anilkumar Gangadhar	43,359	31.79%	▼3.55
Independent	Gandhi Sanjay Shantilal	2,431	1.78%	New
BSP	Bhise Prakash Baburao	1,870	1.37%	New
Margin of victory		7,424	5.44%	▼9.83
Turnout		136,434	65.16%	▲4.57
Total valid votes		136,398		
Registered electors		209,368		▲15.20
SS gain from INC		Swing	▲1.89	

=== Assembly Election 1999 ===
1999 Maharashtra Legislative Assembly election : Nandgaon
Party	Candidate	Votes	%	±%
INC	Aher Anilkumar Gangadhar	35,953	35.34%	▲13.80
SS	Ashok Yadavrao Rasal	20,419	20.07%	▼10.08
Independent	Dhatrak Jagannath Murlidhar	19,189	18.86%	New
Independent	Ahirerajendra Waman	16,504	16.22%	New
Independent	Lalwani Vinod Motilal	4,226	4.15%	New
CPI	Patil Damodar Sakharam	3,912	3.85%	▼16.00
Independent	Pawar Ganpat Khandu	1,164	1.14%	New
Margin of victory		15,534	15.27%	▲6.66
Turnout		110,107	60.59%	▼6.87
Total valid votes		101,735		
Registered electors		181,736		▲0.54
INC gain from SS		Swing	▲5.19	

=== Assembly Election 1995 ===
1995 Maharashtra Legislative Assembly election : Nandgaon
Party	Candidate	Votes	%	±%
SS	Deshmukh Rajendra Devidas	35,786	30.15%	▲14.05
INC	Dhatrak Jagannath Murlidhar	25,564	21.54%	▲1.46
CPI	Gaikwad Madhavrao Bayaji	23,554	19.85%	▲5.84
JD	Hire Madhukar Shivram	13,520	11.39%	New
Independent	Dukale Rodu Govinda	11,545	9.73%	New
Independent	Sanap Shivaji Tatyaba	3,699	3.12%	New
Independent	Kadam Duryodhan Karbhari	1,758	1.48%	New
Margin of victory		10,222	8.61%	▲4.63
Turnout		121,940	67.46%	▲4.81
Total valid votes		118,689		
Registered electors		180,755		▲9.21
SS gain from INC		Swing	▲10.07	

=== Assembly Election 1990 ===
1990 Maharashtra Legislative Assembly election : Nandgaon
Party	Candidate	Votes	%	±%
INC	Dhatrak Jagannath Murlidhar	20,406	20.08%	▼9.86
SS	Ashok Yadavrao Rasal	16,360	16.10%	New
CPI	Madhavrao Bayaji Gaikwad	14,239	14.01%	▼20.20
Independent	Annasaheb Alias Bhanudas Ramchandra Kawade	13,564	13.35%	New
BRP	Suresh Chander Shelke	12,247	12.05%	New
Independent	Kanhailal Chunilal Nahar	11,478	11.29%	New
Independent	Dukale Rodu Govinda	11,227	11.05%	New
Independent	Shaikh Hatam Karim	802	0.79%	New
Margin of victory		4,046	3.98%	▲0.58
Turnout		103,690	62.65%	▲2.38
Total valid votes		101,621		
Registered electors		165,505		▲29.60
INC gain from CPI		Swing	▼14.13	

=== Assembly Election 1985 ===
1985 Maharashtra Legislative Assembly election : Nandgaon
Party	Candidate	Votes	%	±%
CPI	Madhavrao Bayaji Gaikwad	25,735	34.21%	▲5.80
IC(S)	Nahar Kannyalal Chunilal	23,176	30.80%	New
INC	Dhatrak Jagnnath Murlidhar	22,524	29.94%	New
Independent	Sahebrao Barku Bagul	943	1.25%	New
Independent	Ashok Yadero Rasal	847	1.13%	New
Independent	Hirman Rajaram More	543	0.72%	New
Margin of victory		2,559	3.40%	▼12.80
Turnout		76,967	60.27%	▼3.17
Total valid votes		75,235		
Registered electors		127,700		▲8.86
CPI gain from INC(I)		Swing	▼10.40	

=== Assembly Election 1980 ===
1980 Maharashtra Legislative Assembly election : Nandgaon
Party	Candidate	Votes	%	±%
INC(I)	Dhatrak Jagannath Murlidhar	32,473	44.61%	▲40.15
CPI	Gaikwad Madhav Bayaji	20,678	28.41%	▲4.64
INC(U)	Nahar Kanhiyalal Chunilal	19,477	26.76%	New
Margin of victory		11,795	16.20%	▲15.85
Turnout		74,418	63.44%	▼2.07
Total valid votes		72,793		
Registered electors		117,309		▲8.77
INC(I) gain from Independent		Swing	▲13.68	

=== Assembly Election 1978 ===
1978 Maharashtra Legislative Assembly election : Nandgaon
Party	Candidate	Votes	%	±%
Independent	Nahar Kanhiyalal Chunilal	21,243	30.93%	New
INC	Kavade Bhanudas Ramchandra	21,000	30.57%	▼12.61
CPI	Gaikwad Madhavrao Bayaji	16,326	23.77%	▲10.07
Independent	Pagare. D. K	6,592	9.60%	New
INC(I)	Borse Ramkrishna Malji	3,066	4.46%	New
Margin of victory		243	0.35%	▼22.47
Turnout		70,647	65.51%	▲1.14
Total valid votes		68,686		
Registered electors		107,848		▲14.89
Independent gain from INC		Swing	▼12.25	

=== Assembly Election 1972 ===
1972 Maharashtra Legislative Assembly election : Nandgaon
Party	Candidate	Votes	%	±%
INC	Hirubhau Manku Gavali	25,352	43.18%	▼3.24
Independent	Gangadhar Shivaram Aher	11,952	20.36%	New
CPI	Madhavrao B. Gayakwad	8,044	13.70%	New
RPI	Deoram Mahadeo Ahire	6,786	11.56%	New
SSP	Ramrao Pandurang Kavade	4,876	8.31%	New
ABJS	Ramanlal M. Chhajed	1,699	2.89%	New
Margin of victory		13,400	22.82%	▲21.74
Turnout		60,421	64.37%	▼2.53
Total valid votes		58,709		
Registered electors		93,872		▲15.60
INC gain from SSP		Swing	▼4.33	

=== Assembly Election 1967 ===
1967 Maharashtra Legislative Assembly election : Nandgaon
Party	Candidate	Votes	%	±%
SSP	Shivram Dadaji Hire	23,550	47.51%	New
INC	H. M. Gavali	23,013	46.42%	▼13.82
Independent	R. G. Nikam	3,008	6.07%	New
Margin of victory		537	1.08%	▼31.82
Turnout		54,329	66.90%	▲0.88
Total valid votes		49,571		
Registered electors		81,206		▼1.53
SSP gain from INC		Swing	▼12.73	

=== Assembly Election 1962 ===
1962 Maharashtra Legislative Assembly election : Nandgaon
Party	Candidate	Votes	%	±%
INC	Vyankatrao Bhausaheb Hire	30,651	60.24%	▲4.95
PSP	Shivram Dadaji Hire	13,912	27.34%	▼17.37
RPI	Gyandeo Tukaram Deore	6,319	12.42%	New
Margin of victory		16,739	32.90%	▲22.32
Turnout		54,447	66.02%	▲2.09
Total valid votes		50,882		
Registered electors		82,465		▲20.18
INC hold		Swing	▲4.95	

=== Assembly Election 1957 ===
1957 Bombay State Legislative Assembly election : Nandgaon
Party	Candidate	Votes	%	±%
INC	Hiray Bhausahib Sakharam	24,256	55.29%	▲24.39
PSP	Hiray Shivaram Dada	19,614	44.71%	New
Margin of victory		4,642	10.58%	▲7.30
Turnout		43,870	63.93%	▼0.22
Total valid votes		43,870		
Registered electors		68,617		▲70.30
INC hold		Swing	▲24.39	

=== Assembly Election 1952 ===
1952 Hyderabad State Legislative Assembly election : Nandgaon
Party	Candidate	Votes	%	±%
INC	Punjabrao Bapurao Yawalikar	7,986	30.90%	New
Independent	Vimlabai Punjabrao Deshmukh	7,139	27.62%	New
SCF	Dinkar Suryabhan Thorat	6,850	26.50%	New
KMPP	Balwant Uttamrao Deshmukh	2,299	8.89%	New
Socialist	Kashirao Jansa Ghulane	479	1.85%	New
Independent	Nathu Bablaji Ingole	476	1.84%	New
Forward Bloc (Marxist Group)	Kesheorao Tulsiram Jadheo	418	1.62%	New
Independent	Haribhau Ganeshrao Wath	200	0.77%	New
Margin of victory		847	3.28%	
Turnout		25,847	64.15%	
Total valid votes		25,847		
Registered electors		40,291		
INC win (new seat)				

== See also ==
- Nandgaon (disambiguation)
