= Madhavrao Bayaji Gaikwad =

Indian politician

Member of the Maharashtra Legislative Council
- In office 1957–1962

Leader of Opposition of the Maharashtra Legislative Council
- In office 1960–1962

Member of the Maharashtra Legislative Assembly
- In office 1985–1990
- Preceded by: Kanhaiyalal Chunilal Nahar
- Succeeded by: Jaganath Murlidhar Dhatrak
- Constituency: Manmad

Personal details
- Born: July 18, 1924; Manmad, Bombay Presidency, British India
- Died: November 12, 2018 (aged 94)
- Political party: Communist Party of India

Madhavrao Bayaji Gaikwad (July 18, 1924 – November 12, 2018 ) was a freedom fighter and leader of Communist Party of India (CPI). He was a member of the Maharashtra Legislative Council from 1957-1962. He became the first Leader of Opposition in the Council and held the post from 1960 to 1962. He represented Manmad constituency from 1985 to 1990. He also headed the Manmad Municipal Council here in 1974 and fought for many years for the welfare of farmers.
