= Adhale Budruk =

Village in Maharashtra, India

- Village
- Location in Maharashtra, India Adhale Budruk (India)
- Coordinates: 18.6573557°N 73.5637236°E
- Country: India
- State: Maharashtra
- District: Pune
- Tehsil: Mawal

Government
  - Type: Panchayati Raj
  - Body: Gram panchayat

Area
  - Total: 872 ha (2,150 acres)

Population (2011)
  - Total: 1,574
  - Density: 181/km^{2} (468/sq mi)
- Sex ratio 808/766 ♂/♀

Languages
  - Official: Marathi
  - Other spoken: Hindi
- Time zone: UTC+5:30 (IST)
- Pin code: 410405
- Telephone code: 02114
- ISO 3166 code: IN-MH
- Vehicle registration: MH-14
- Website: pune.nic.in

Adhale Budruk is a village and gram panchayat in India, situated in Mawal taluka of Pune district in the state of Maharashtra. It encompasses an area of 872 ha (2,155 acres).

== Administration ==
The village is administrated by a sarpanch, an elected representative who leads a gram panchayat. At the time of the 2011 Census of India, the village was the headquarters for the eponymous gram panchayat, which also governed the villages of Kambare Nane Mawal, Nandgaon and Talegaon Dabhade. Nandgaon was uninhabited.

== Demographics ==
At the 2011 census, the village comprised 297 households. The population of 1574 was split between 808 males and 766 females.

== See also ==
- List of villages in Mawal taluka
