= Suhas Kande =

Indian Politician (shiv Sena shinde gaat)

Member of the Maharashtra Legislative Assembly
- Incumbent
- Assumed office October 2019
- Preceded by: Pankaj Bhujbal
- Constituency: Nandgaon

Personal details
- Party: Shiv Sena
- Children: 1

Suhas Dwarkanath Kande is an Indian politician. He was a member of Maharashtra Legislative Assembly from Nandgaon constituency as a member of the Shiv Sena. His daughter’s name is Devika Suhas Kande.

== Positions held ==
- 2019: Elected to Maharashtra Legislative Assembly
- Head Change Management - Shivsena
