= Pankaj Bhujbal =

Indian politician

Member of Maharashtra Legislative Council
- Incumbent
- Assumed office 16 October 2024
- Constituency: Nominated by Governor

Member of Maharashtra Legislative Assembly
- In office (2009-2014), (2014 – 2019)
- Preceded by: Sanjay Pawar
- Succeeded by: Suhas Kande
- Constituency: Nandgaon

Personal details
- Party: Nationalist Congress Party
- Parent: Chhagan Bhujbal (father)

Pankaj Chhagan Bhujbal is an Indian politician and member of Nationalist Congress Party, was elected as member of Maharashtra Legislative Assembly twice from Nandgaon. He is the son of veteran politician and mass base leader Chhagan Bhujbal.

== Terms in office ==
2009-2014 : Elected to Maharashtra Legislative Assembly (1st Term)

2014-2019 : Re-elected to Maharashtra Legislative Assembly (2nd Term)

2024 : Elected to Maharashtra Legislative Council (1st Term)
