= Arjun Tulshiram Pawar =

Indian politician

Member of Maharashtra Legislative Assembly
- In office 1978–1985
- Preceded by: Dongar Rama More
- Succeeded by: Bahiram Kashinath Narayan
- Constituency: Kalvan
- In office 1990–2014
- Preceded by: Bahiram Kashinath Narayan
- Succeeded by: Gavit Jiva Pandu

Personal details
- Born: 1 December 1938 Kalwan, Maharashtra

Arjun Tulshiram Pawar (also known as A. T. Pawar) was an Indian politician belonging to NCP. He was the minister of state for tribal welfare in the cabinet of Vilasrao Deshmukh in the Maharashtra state government. He was elected from the Kalvan constituency seven times and once from the Surgana constituency to the Maharashtra State Assembly.

He died in 2017 due to prolonged illness.

His daughter-in-law Bharati Pawar is former Minister of State, Ministry of Health and Family Welfare.
