= Nandgaon, Jalgaon =

Village in Maharashtra, India

Nandgaon is a village panchayat located in the Jalgaon district of Maharashtra state, India. The latitude 21.1280968 and the longitude 75.4272768 are the coordinates of the panchayat. It is 28 km from the Jalgaon railway station and has a population of approximately 2000 people. It is bordered by Kinod and Fesardi in the north, Pilkheda in the east, Kavthal in the southeast, and Chorgaon in the south. The Girna and Tapi are the main rivers flowing near Nandgaon, which is surrounded by the Girna river on three sides.

== Agriculture ==
Agriculture is the main occupation of the people here. Nandgaon is popular for its banana plantation with the Jalgaon district being one of the largest banana producers in the world, accounting for about 70% of Maharashtra’s banana output and 11-12% of India's annual output, and Nandgaon plays a vital role in this production. Other agricultural crops widely planted in Nandgaon are cotton and pulses.

== Religion ==
Nandgaon is also known for its yearly "Harinam Saptah" (One week Hymn). Other festivals like Dipawali, Holi, and Pola are celebrated here as well.

== Languages ==
Ahirani and Marathi are the primary languages in Nandgaon.
