= Rahul Daulatrao Aher =

Indian politician

Dr. Rahul Daulatrao Aher
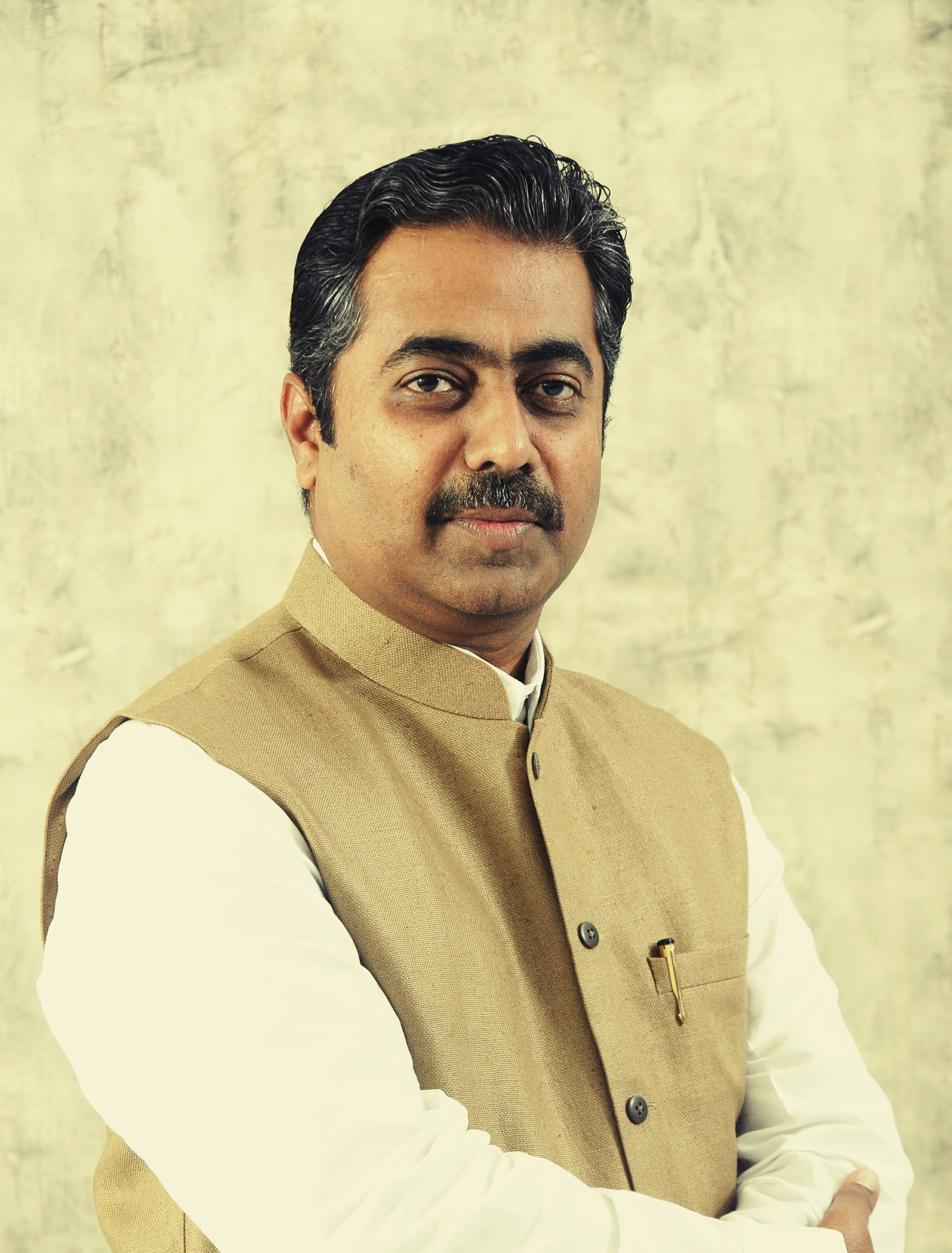

Member of the Maharashtra Legislative Assembly
- Incumbent
- Assumed office 2014
- Preceded by: Shirishkumar Kotwal
- Constituency: Chandwad

Personal details
- Born: 16 August 1973 (age 51); Nashik
- Spouse: Anuja
- Children: 2 sons
- Parent: Daulatrao Aher (father)
- Education: M.B.B.S; M. S (Ortho)
- Profession: Doctor, Politician

Rahul Daulatrao Aher is a Member of the Legislative Assembly from Chandwad (Vidhan Sabha constituency) of Maharashtra as a member of Bharatiya Janata Party. On 19 October 2014, he won the assembly election, defeating Indian National Congress candidate by over 11,000 votes.
