= Nandgaon, Mawal =

Village in Maharashtra

Nandgaon in Mawal taluka of Pune district, Maharashtra, India, was listed as a village in the 2011 Census of India but was recorded as being uninhabited at that time, as it also was in 2001. It comprised an area of 793 ha (1,960 acres).

The village is administrated by a sarpanch, an elected representative who leads a gram panchayat. At the time of the 2011 census, the gram panchayat governed four villages and was based at Adhale Budruk.

== See also ==
- List of villages in Mawal taluka
