= Kalwan taluka =

Kalwan Kalwan
- City
- Location in Maharashtra, India
- Coordinates: 20°29′25″N 74°01′35″E
- Country: India
- State: Maharashtra
- District: Nashik

Government
  - Type: Municipal Council
  - Body: Kalwan Municipal Council

Area
  - Total: 859.71 km^{2} (331.94 sq mi)

Population (2011)
  - Total: 346,000
  - Density: 402/km^{2} (1,040/sq mi)
- Demonym: Kalwankar

Language
  - Official: Marathi
- Time zone: UTC+5:30 (IST)
- PIN: 423501
- Vehicle registration: MH 41
- Nearest city: Satana, Deola, Nashik

Kalwan is a tehsil in Kalwan subdivision of Nashik District in Maharashtra, India, 80 km from Nashik and 251 km from the state capital Mumbai.

== History ==
Kalwan is identified with the Kallāvana mentioned in inscriptions dated to 597 and between 709-711. The people of Kallāvana, as the Kolavānahs, were mentioned as people of the Aparānta.
