= Jiva Pandu Gavit =

Indian politician

Jiva Pandu Gavit is an Indian politician from the state of Maharashtra. He belongs to the Communist Party of India (Marxist) and is a seven-term member of the Maharashtra Legislative Assembly representing Surgana and Kalwan constituencies. He was elected the Pro-tem Speaker of the Maharashtra Legislative Assembly in 2014 and was the only leftist member of the 13th Legislative Assembly in Maharashtra.

== Political career ==
Gavit started his political career as a farmers rights advocate and became a member of the Kisan Sabha. A staunch Communist Gavit was first elected to the Maharashtra Legislative Assembly from the Surgana constituency in 1978 on a Communist Party of India (Marxist) ticket and narrowly beat his opponent Chavan Harichandra Deoram by four hundred votes. In the next assembly election of 1980 Gavit won against the Indian National Congress candidate Bhoye Sitaram Sayaji by about eighteen hundred votes. The following election of 1985 Gavit defeated the ruling party candidate Kahandole Zamru Manglu from the Indian national congress by more than twelve thousand votes. In the following 1990 assembly election a confident Gavit and by now already a three term member of the Maharashtra Legislative Assembly took on the Indian national congress's Bhoye Sitaram Sayaji whom he had defeated in the 1980 election. The result was the same and Gavit won by a margin of over sixteen thousand votes. This win sent him for the fourth time to the Maharashtra's lower house. By the time the 1995 assembly election happened, Gavit was facing a seventeen-year anti-incumbency and lost to an independent candidate Harischandra Devram Chavan by a huge margin of about twenty-seven thousand votes. In the following 1999 and 2004 Maharashtra assembly election Gavit held the seat both times defeating Harischandra Devram Chavan who had by now joined Sharad Pawar's Nationalist Congress Party by eleven thousand votes and defeating Bhaskar Gopal of the Shiv Sena by fourteen thousand votes respectively. In 2009 due to delimitation by the Election Commission of India Gavit had to change his assembly constituency and left his safe seat of Surgana to fight from a newly formed constituency called Kalwan where he took on eight term assembly member and sitting minister of the government Arjun Tulshiram Pawar, Gavit lost to Pawar of the Nationalist Congress Party by more than sixteen thousand votes. The 2014 elections were a referendum for the ruling Congress and the Nationalist Congress as there was a fifteen-year anti-incumbency and Gavit defeated Arjun Tulshiram Pawar by a slender margin of about four thousand votes.
