= Wardha Lok Sabha constituency =

Lok Sabha constituency in Maharashtra

Coordinates: 20.7°N 78.6°E

Wardha
- Lok Sabha constituency
- Wardha Lok Sabha Constituency map

Constituency details
- Country: India
- Region: Western India
- State: Maharashtra
- Assembly constituencies: Dhamangaon Railway; Morshi; Arvi; Deoli; Hinganghat; Wardha
- Total electors: 1,682,771
- Reservation: None

Member of Parliament
- 18th Lok Sabha
- Incumbent Amar Sharadrao Kale
- Party: NCP-SP
- Alliance: INDIA
- Elected year: 2024
- Preceded by: Ramdas Tadas

Wardha is one of the 48 Lok Sabha (parliamentary) constituencies in the Maharashtra state in western India. This constituency is spread over Amravati and Wardha districts.

== Assembly segments ==
Presently, Wardha Lok Sabha constituency comprises six Vidhan Sabha (legislative assembly) segments. These segments are:

#	Name	District	Member	Party	Leading (in 2024)
36	Dhamangaon Railway	Amravati	Pratap Adsad	BJP	NCP-SP
43	Morshi	Amravati	Chandu Atmaramji Yawalkar	BJP	BJP
44	Arvi	Wardha	Sumit Wankhede	BJP	NCP-SP
45	Deoli-Pulgaon	Wardha	Rajesh Bhaurao Bakane	BJP	NCP-SP
46	Hinganghat	Wardha	Samir Kunawar	BJP	NCP-SP
47	Wardha	Wardha	Pankaj Bhoyar	BJP	NCP-SP

== Members of Parliament ==
Year	Name	Party
1952	Shriman Narayan Agarwal	Indian National Congress
1957	Kamalnayan Bajaj	Indian National Congress
1962	Kamalnayan Bajaj	Indian National Congress
1967	Kamalnayan Bajaj	Indian National Congress
1971	Jagjivanrao G. Kadam	Indian National Congress
1977	Santoshrao Gode	Indian National Congress
1980	Vasant Sathe	Indian National Congress (I)
1984	Vasant Sathe	Indian National Congress
1989	Vasant Sathe	Indian National Congress
1991	Ramchandra Ghangare	Communist Party of India
1996	Vijay Mude	Bharatiya Janata Party
1998	Datta Meghe	Indian National Congress
1999	Prabha Rau	Indian National Congress
2004	Suresh Waghmare	Bharatiya Janata Party
2009	Datta Meghe	Indian National Congress
2014	Ramdas Tadas	Bharatiya Janata Party
2019	Ramdas Tadas	Bharatiya Janata Party
2024	Amar Sharadrao Kale	Nationalist Congress Party (Sharadchandra Pawar)

== Election results ==
=== 2024 ===
2024 Indian general elections: Wardha
Party	Candidate	Votes	%	±%
NCP-SP	Amar Sharadrao Kale	533,106	48.68	New
BJP	Ramdas Tadas	4,51,458	41.23	▼12.69
BSP	Dr. Mohan Ramraoji Raikwar	20,795	1.90	▼1.50
VBA	Prof. Rajendra Gulabrao Salunkhe	15,492	1.41	▼1.99
NOTA	None of the Above	4,634	0.42	▼0.19
Majority		81,648	7.46	▼9.99
Turnout		10,95,012	65.07	▲3.54
NCP-SP gain from BJP		Swing		

=== 2019 ===
2019 Indian general elections: Wardha
Party	Candidate	Votes	%	±%
BJP	Ramdas Tadas	578,364	53.92	
INC	Charulata Tokas	3,91,173	36.47	
VBA	Dhanraj Vanjari	36,452	3.40	
BSP	Shaileshkumar Agrawal	36,423	3.40	
NOTA	None of the Above	6,510	0.61	▼0.19
Majority		1,87,191	17.45	
Turnout		10,72,657	61.53	−3.26
BJP gain from INC		Swing		

=== General elections, 2014 ===
2014 Indian general elections: Wardha
Party	Candidate	Votes	%	±%
BJP	Ramdas Tadas	537,518	53.04	
INC	Sagar Datta Meghe	3,21,735	31.75	
BSP	Chetan Pendam	90,866	8.97	
Majority		2,15,783	21.29	
Turnout		10,13,445	64.79	+10.19
BJP gain from INC		Swing		

=== General election, 2009 ===
2009 Indian general elections:Wardha
Party	Candidate	Votes	%	±%
INC	Datta Meghe	352,853	45.88	
BJP	Suresh Waghmare	2,56,935	33.40	
BSP	Bipin Kangale	1,31,643	17.11	
Majority		95,918	12.47	
Turnout		7,69,251	54.60	
INC gain from BJP		Swing		

== See also ==
- Wardha district
- Amravati district
- List of constituencies of the Lok Sabha
