= 96th Marathi Sahitya Sammelan =

96th Akhil Bharatiya Marathi Sahitya Sammelan
- Date: 3–5 February 2023
- Venue: Rashtrapita Mahatma Gandhi Sahitya Nagari, Swawlambi Vidyalaya
- Locations: Wardha, Maharashtra
- Country: India
- Previous event: 95th
- Next event: 97th
- President: Narendra Chapalgaonkar
- Organiser: Akhil Bharatiya Marathi Sahitya Mahamandal; Vidharbha Sahitya Sangh

The 96th Akhil Bharatiya Marathi Sahitya Sammelan was the Marathi conference held in Wardha, Maharashtra. It is the 96th Marathi literary conference co-organised by Akhil Bharatiya Marathi Sahitya Mahamandal with Vidarbha Sahitya Sangh.

== Presidency ==
On November 8, 2022, the Akhil Bharatiya Marathi Sahitya Mahamandal held a meeting in Wardha, where finalized Narendra Chapalgaonkar as president for the 96th conference by Usha Tambe. Initially Suresh Dwadashiwar was considered for the position. However, he faced criticism due to his controversial remark – "most of the writers of fine literature were upper caste" and criticized Mahatma Gandhi, stating that he was influenced by Vinayak Damodar Savarkar's ideology. The sahitya parishad condemned these divisive statements and dropped the selection of Suresh Dwadashiwar.

== Preparations ==
Vidarbha Sahitya Sangh, a member organization of the corporation, proposed holding its 96th convention in Vidarbha to mark its centennial year. The suggested location for the event was Wardha. On 28 May 2022, the site selection committee of Sahitya Mahamandal visited Wardha to inspect the grounds and parking facilities. The following day, on 29 May 2022, a meeting of Sahitya Mahamandal was held in Nagpur, where it was decided to host the convention in Wardha, Vidarbha.

The conference take place on the 23 acre ground of Swawlambi Vidyalaya in Wardha, which referred to as "Mahatma Gandhi Sahitya Nagri". In November 2022, Usha Tambe revealed that the dates might be finalized during the next board of directors meeting in Goa. It is a second time conference in Wardha selected on a request from the Vidarbha Sahitya Sammelan, following the 48th Akhil Bharatiya Sahitya Sammelan.

== Conference ==
The conference took place in Wardha from February 3 to 5. It began with the traditional Granth Dindi on February 3, featuring students from various local schools dressed as Vitthal–Rukmini, Samarth Ramdas, Tukaram, Dnyaneshwar, Eknath, Chakradhar Swami, Mahatma Gandhi, Tukdoji Maharaj, Janabai, Shivaji, Jijabai, Rani of Jhansi, and Mother Teresa.

The key inauguration ceremony of the conference occurred on February 3, 2023, at Rashtrapita Mahatma Gandhi Sahitya Nagari, Swawlambi Vidyalaya with Chief Minister of Maharashtra Eknath Shinde officiating, alongside several notable figures in Marathi literature. A 30 feet by 12 feet board, made from 100 meters of khadi rope, was displayed on the stage. The program was moderated by Renuka Deshkar.

Nitin Gadkari attended the meeting. The film personalities in Marathi cinema like Nagraj Manjule, Kishor Kadam, Sayaji Shinde, Arvind Jagtap were also present.

== Participated leaders ==
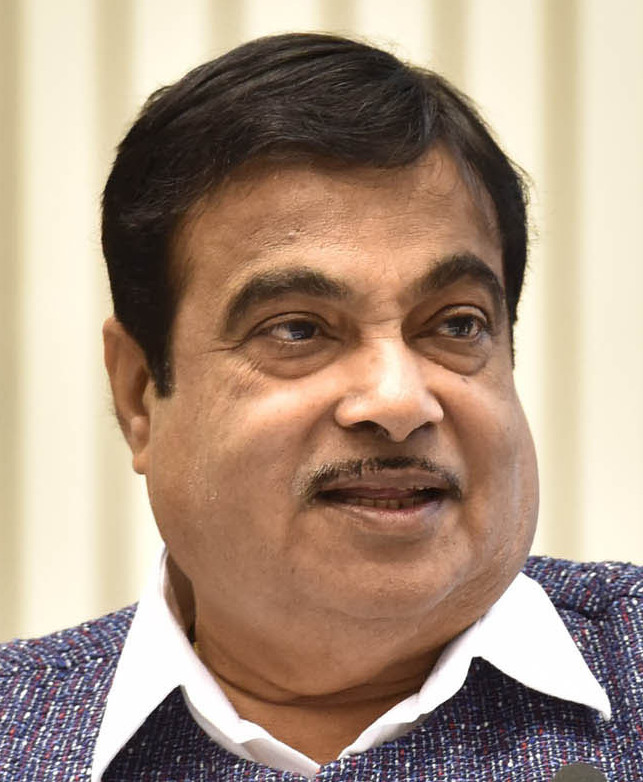
Nitin Gadkari
Minister of Road Transport & Highways

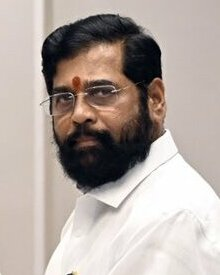
Eknath Shinde
Chief Minister of Maharashtra

Devendra Fadnavis
Deputy Chief Minister of Maharashtra

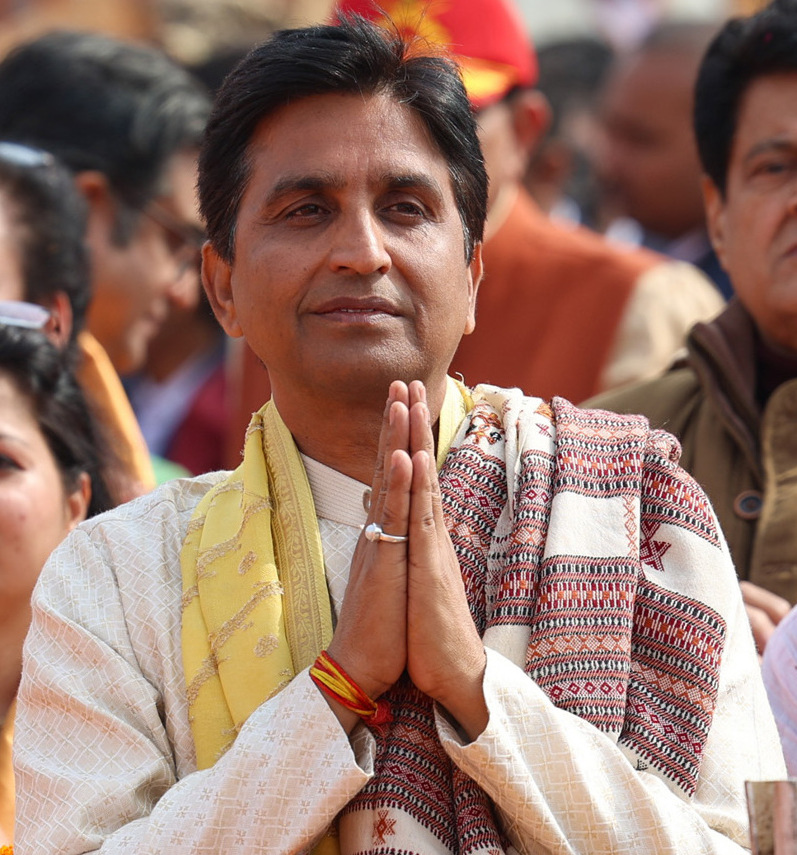
Kumar Vishwas
Hindi poet, politician, and a lecturer

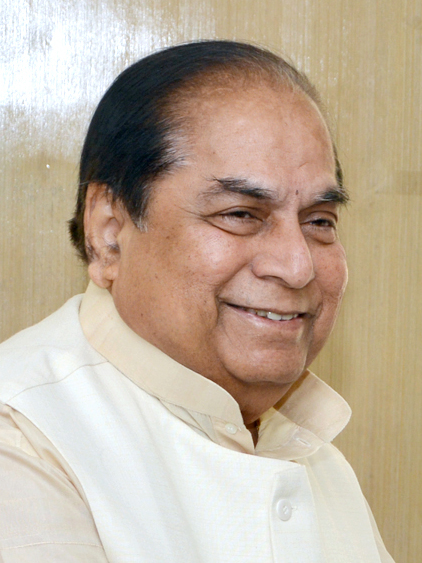
D. Y. Patil
Politician

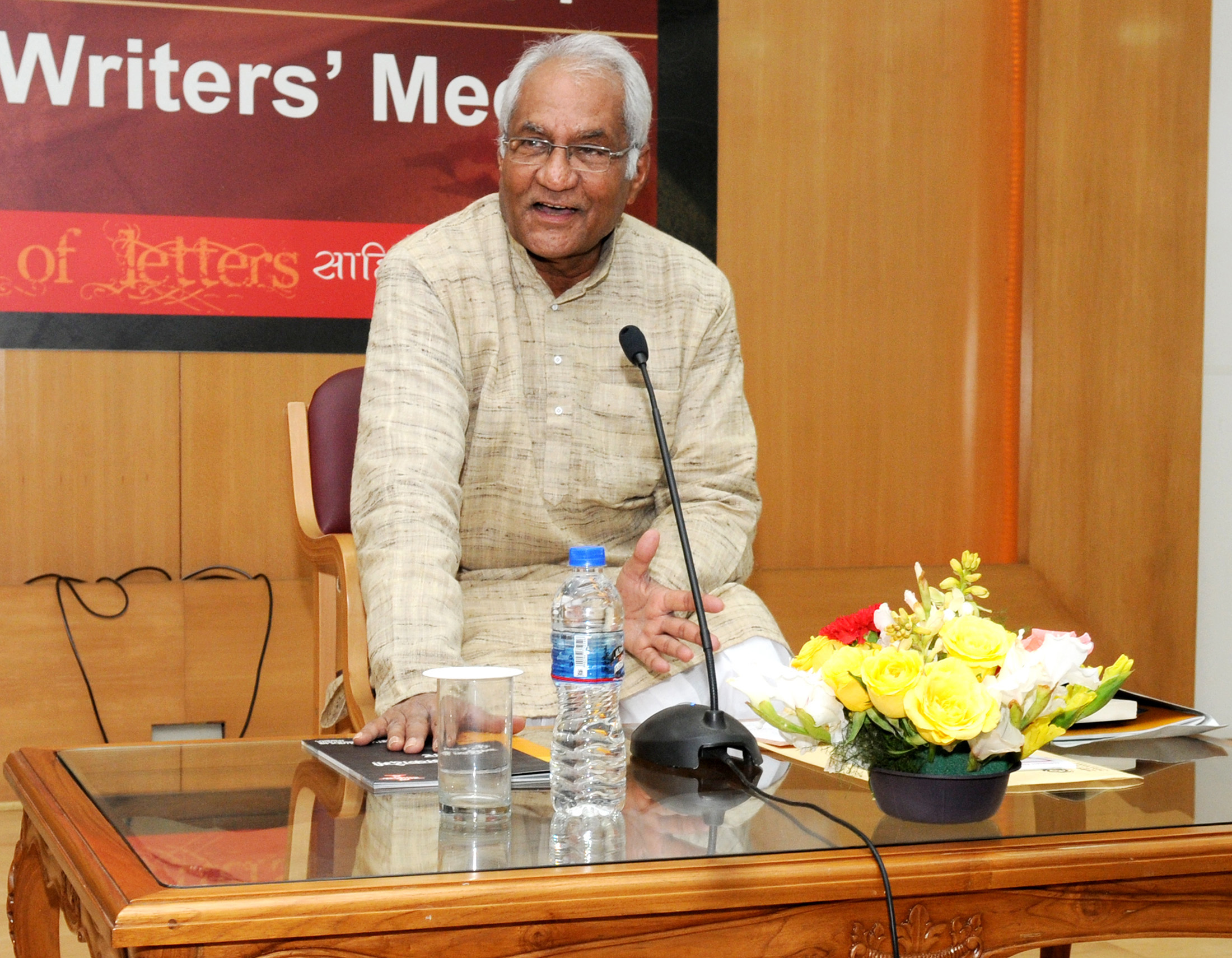
Vishwanath Prasad Tiwari
President of the Sahitya Akademi

Anil Bonde
Politician

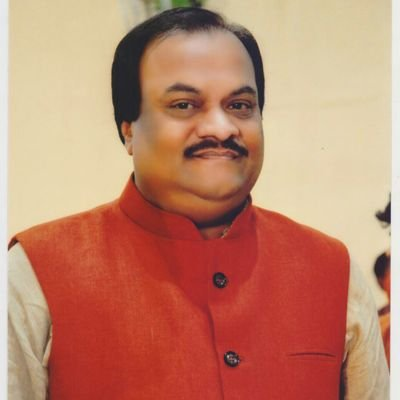
Samir Trimbakrao Kunawar
Politician

== Controversies ==
The organisations in Wardha which follows the ideology of Mahatma Gandhi and Vinoba Bhave such as the Vinoba Janmasthan Trust, Sevagram Ashram Pratishthan, Maharashtra Sarvodaya Mandal, and Kisan Adhikar Abhiyaan issued a leaflet addressing their objections and had raised concerns about a seminar Manohar "Mhaisaalkar Sabhamandapat: Gandhiji and Vinobaji: Present Perspective" held on February 5, 2023. The leaflet states, "The seminar was conducted by Dr. Vinay Sahastrabuddhe, who is associated with the anti-Gandhi organisation Rashtriya Swayamsevak Sangh. This raises the question of whether the seminar truly reflects Mahatma Gandhi and Vinoba Bhave's perspectives."

== Protests ==
The protesters initiated their demonstration shortly after the program began. During the Chief Minister of Maharashtra's speech, Vidarbha supporters in the hall staged a protest by dispersing leaflets onto the dais. The police promptly intervened and detained the individuals involved.

== Promises ==
On February 5, 2023, the final day of the conference coinciding the Vidarbha Sahitya Sangh's 100th anniversary, Devendra Fadnavis announced that the state government would grant ₹10 crore to the organization.
