= Arvi Assembly constituency =

Constituency of the Maharashtra legislative assembly in India

Coordinates: 20°4′21.72″N 77°57′2.27″E

Arvi
- Constituency No. 44 for the Maharashtra Legislative Assembly

Constituency details
- Country: India
- Region: Western India
- State: Maharashtra
- District: Wardha
- Lok Sabha constituency: Wardha
- Established: 1952
- Total electors: 265,641
- Reservation: None

Member of Legislative Assembly
- 15th Maharashtra Legislative Assembly
- Incumbent Sumit Wankhede
- Party: BJP
- Alliance: NDA
- Elected year: 2024

Arvi Assembly constituency is one of the 288 Vidhan Sabha (legislative assembly) constituencies in Maharashtra state in western India. This constituency is one of the four Vidhan Sabha constituencies in Wardha district.

Arvi is part of the Wardha Lok Sabha constituency along with five other Vidhan Sabha segments, namely Wardha, Hinganghat and Deoli in Wardha district and Morshi and Dhamangaon Railway in Amravati district.

== Members of the Legislative Assembly ==
Year	Member	Party
1952	Jagjiwan Ganpatrao Kadam	Indian National Congress
1957	Bapuraoji Marotrao Deshmukh	Indian National Congress
1962	Narayanrao Rajeramji Kale	Independent politician
1967	Jagjiwan Ganpatrao Kadam	Indian National Congress
1972	Dhairyashilrao Vinayakrao	Independent politician
1978	Chudiwal Shiochand Gowardhandas	Independent politician
1980	Chudiwal Shiochand Gowardhandas	Indian National Congress
1985	Dr. Sharadrao Kale	Indian Congress
1990	Dr. Sharadrao Kale	Indian National Congress
1995	Dr. Sharadrao Kale	Indian National Congress
1999	Dr. Sharadrao Kale	Indian National Congress
2004	Amar Sharadrao Kale	Indian National Congress
2009	Dadarao Keche	Bharatiya Janata Party
2014	Amar Sharadrao Kale	Indian National Congress
2019	Dadarao Keche	Bharatiya Janata Party
2024	Sumit Wankhede	Bharatiya Janata Party

== Election results ==
=== Assembly Election 2024 ===
2024 Maharashtra Legislative Assembly election : Arvi
Party	Candidate	Votes	%	±%
BJP	Sumit Wankhede	101,397	52.93%	▲3.18
NCP-SP	Mayura Amar Kale	61,823	32.27%	New
PHJSP	Jaydada Belkhade	13,252	6.92%	New
Independent	Deepak Mahadeorao Madavi	5,160	2.69%	New
Independent	Madhuritai Arvind Suroshe	2,799	1.46%	New
BSP	Dadarao Kisanrao Uikey	2,052	1.07%	▼0.29
NOTA	None of the above	1,035	0.54%	▼0.27
Margin of victory		39,574	20.66%	▲13.56
Turnout		192,621	72.51%	▲4.99
Total valid votes		191,586		
Registered electors		265,641		▲1.16
BJP hold		Swing	▲3.18	

=== Assembly Election 2019 ===
2019 Maharashtra Legislative Assembly election : Arvi
Party	Candidate	Votes	%	±%
BJP	Dadarao Keche	87,318	49.75%	▲6.70
INC	Amar Sharadrao Kale	74,851	42.65%	▼2.26
Independent	Deepak Mahadeorao Madavi	6,031	3.44%	New
VBA	Topale Rupachand	2,848	1.62%	New
BSP	Adv. Chandrashekhar Dongre	2,386	1.36%	▼1.81
NOTA	None of the above	1,416	0.81%	▲0.08
Margin of victory		12,467	7.10%	▲5.24
Turnout		177,314	67.52%	▼0.89
Total valid votes		175,513		
Registered electors		262,594		▲5.53
BJP gain from INC		Swing	▲4.84	

=== Assembly Election 2014 ===
2014 Maharashtra Legislative Assembly election : Arvi
Party	Candidate	Votes	%	±%
INC	Amar Sharadrao Kale	75,886	44.91%	▲0.90
BJP	Dadarao Keche	72,743	43.05%	▼2.97
BSP	Dadarao Kisanrao Uikey	5,348	3.17%	▼0.32
NCP	Sandeep Dilip Kale	3,861	2.29%	New
Independent	Swapnil Alias Bala Rameshrao Jagtap	3,642	2.16%	New
GGP	Dnyaneshwar Narayanrao Madavi	2,297	1.36%	New
SS	Deshmukh Nilesh Madhukarrao	2,174	1.29%	New
NOTA	None of the above	1,240	0.73%	New
Margin of victory		3,143	1.86%	▼0.15
Turnout		170,215	68.41%	▲0.95
Total valid votes		168,965		
Registered electors		248,828		▲7.70
INC gain from BJP		Swing	▼1.11	

=== Assembly Election 2009 ===
2009 Maharashtra Legislative Assembly election : Arvi
Party	Candidate	Votes	%	±%
BJP	Dadarao Keche	71,694	46.02%	▲13.03
INC	Amar Sharadrao Kale	68,564	44.01%	▼7.02
BSP	Rupachandbhau Topale	5,443	3.49%	▼3.12
Independent	Wagh Shirish Dhairyashilrao	3,536	2.27%	New
CPI	Gorde Raju Bakerao	2,411	1.55%	▼1.65
BBM	Namdeo Nathuji Meshram	1,688	1.08%	New
Independent	Priya Ashok Shinde	1,054	0.68%	New
Margin of victory		3,130	2.01%	▼16.03
Turnout		155,861	67.46%	▼3.00
Total valid votes		155,785		
Registered electors		231,047		▲17.10
BJP gain from INC		Swing	▼5.01	

=== Assembly Election 2004 ===
2004 Maharashtra Legislative Assembly election : Arvi
Party	Candidate	Votes	%	±%
INC	Amar Sharadrao Kale	70,938	51.03%	▼6.55
BJP	Dadarao Keche	45,861	32.99%	▼1.63
BSP	Prashant Madhukarrao Sawalakhe	9,194	6.61%	New
CPI	Dhole Deorao Lakshman	4,443	3.20%	New
Independent	Madavi Mahadeo Dhondbaji	3,965	2.85%	New
Independent	Abdul Rafik Abdual Agit	2,025	1.46%	New
Margin of victory		25,077	18.04%	▼4.92
Turnout		139,010	70.46%	▲2.66
Total valid votes		139,008		
Registered electors		197,303		▲3.07
INC hold		Swing	▼6.55	

=== Assembly By-election 2002 ===
2002 Maharashtra Legislative Assembly by-election : Arvi
Party	Candidate	Votes	%	±%
INC	Kale Amar Sharadrao	74,738	57.58%	▲18.03
BJP	Vijay Annaji Mude	44,938	34.62%	▲6.46
Independent	Vinod Pandurang Patil	4,235	3.26%	New
GGP	Kodape Ashok Chaituji	1,705	1.31%	New
Independent	Patil Haridas Shamraoji	1,462	1.13%	New
Independent	Irpache Pramila Bapurao	1,389	1.07%	New
Independent	Ratanlal Hansaraj Solanki(patil)	1,331	1.03%	New
Margin of victory		29,800	22.96%	▲11.57
Turnout		129,799	67.80%	▲2.86
Total valid votes		129,798		
Registered electors		191,435		▲5.21
INC hold		Swing	▲18.03	

=== Assembly Election 1999 ===
1999 Maharashtra Legislative Assembly election : Arvi
Party	Candidate	Votes	%	±%
INC	Dr. Sharadrao Kale	43,897	39.55%	▲0.09
BJP	Vijayraoji Mude	31,254	28.16%	▲24.80
NCP	Shridhar S. Thakare	27,681	24.94%	New
CPI	Devrao Dhole	3,416	3.08%	New
Independent	Sancheti Jaisagar Madanlal	2,621	2.36%	New
Independent	Rupchand Bhuraji Tople	925	0.83%	New
Margin of victory		12,643	11.39%	▲3.83
Turnout		118,162	64.94%	▼16.25
Total valid votes		110,997		
Registered electors		181,958		▲3.40
INC hold		Swing	▲0.09	

=== Assembly Election 1995 ===
1995 Maharashtra Legislative Assembly election : Arvi
Party	Candidate	Votes	%	±%
INC	Dr. Sharadrao Kale	55,164	39.46%	▲3.44
Independent	Kale Dilip Narayanrao	44,591	31.90%	New
BSP	Uike Bapuraoji Birmal	16,048	11.48%	▲7.10
Independent	Gulhane Vasantrao Krushnarao	7,444	5.33%	New
BJP	Keche Dadarao Yadaorao	4,694	3.36%	New
BBM	Sarode Vithal Keduji	3,050	2.18%	New
Independent	Nagose Ramchandra Daulatrao	2,758	1.97%	New
JD	Sayeed Mehmudali Sayeed Ismail	1,720	1.23%	▼26.43
Margin of victory		10,573	7.56%	▼0.81
Turnout		142,878	81.19%	▲16.37
Total valid votes		139,789		
Registered electors		175,971		▲8.96
INC hold		Swing	▲3.44	

=== Assembly Election 1990 ===
1990 Maharashtra Legislative Assembly election : Arvi
Party	Candidate	Votes	%	±%
INC	Dr. Sharadrao Kale	37,050	36.02%	▼7.63
JD	Khonde Jyoti Vijayrao	28,444	27.66%	New
SS	Deshpande Kishor Bapurao	8,942	8.69%	New
Independent	Gundewar Arvind Wasudeorao	8,095	7.87%	New
Independent	Chudiwal Shiochand Gowardhandas	6,620	6.44%	New
BSP	Uike Bapurao Birmalji	4,506	4.38%	New
Independent	Rathod Pancharaj Pandurang	1,436	1.40%	New
Independent	Kurda Jagdish Ramji	1,306	1.27%	New
Margin of victory		8,606	8.37%	▲7.85
Turnout		104,688	64.82%	▼2.93
Total valid votes		102,848		
Registered electors		161,496		▲22.26
INC gain from IC(S)		Swing	▼8.14	

=== Assembly Election 1985 ===
1985 Maharashtra Legislative Assembly election : Arvi
Party	Candidate	Votes	%	±%
IC(S)	Dr. Sharadrao Kale	38,955	44.16%	New
INC	Shridhar S. Thakare	38,499	43.65%	New
RPI	Sheikh Vajir Umarsahab	6,251	7.09%	New
Independent	Atram Vyankatesh Bisam	2,026	2.30%	New
Independent	Kanta Deorao Naitam	986	1.12%	New
Independent	Varhade Krushna Bapurao	673	0.76%	New
Margin of victory		456	0.52%	▼30.36
Turnout		89,490	67.75%	▲8.34
Total valid votes		88,207		
Registered electors		132,087		▲6.24
IC(S) gain from INC(I)		Swing	▼17.71	

=== Assembly Election 1980 ===
1980 Maharashtra Legislative Assembly election : Arvi
Party	Candidate	Votes	%	±%
INC(I)	Chudiwal Shiochand Gowardhandas	44,859	61.87%	New
INC(U)	Dr. Sharadrao Kale	22,472	31.00%	New
RPI(K)	Nakhale Laxmanrao Karkaji	1,894	2.61%	New
Independent	Gomkala Mahadeorao Pandurangji	1,092	1.51%	New
Independent	Atram Vyankatesh Bisam	1,038	1.43%	New
Independent	Gadling Nattu Bapurao	829	1.14%	New
Margin of victory		22,387	30.88%	▼26.90
Turnout		73,864	59.41%	▼18.58
Total valid votes		72,502		
Registered electors		124,331		▲5.08
INC(I) gain from Independent		Swing	▼9.05	

=== Assembly Election 1978 ===
1978 Maharashtra Legislative Assembly election : Arvi
Party	Candidate	Votes	%	±%
Independent	Chudiwal Shiochand Gowardhandas	64,168	70.92%	New
JP	Wagh Dhairyashilrao Vinayakrao	11,890	13.14%	New
INC	Mohod Vishwanathji Yadavrao	9,981	11.03%	▼25.51
Independent	Atram Punjabrao Chhanuji	1,741	1.92%	New
Independent	Meshram Vithalrao Tukaram	1,018	1.13%	New
Independent	Abdul Hafiz Shekh Ibrahim	659	0.73%	New
Independent	Borade Kashinath Nathuji	585	0.65%	New
Margin of victory		52,278	57.78%	▲45.00
Turnout		92,275	77.99%	▲4.99
Total valid votes		90,474		
Registered electors		118,317		▲10.75
Independent hold		Swing	▲21.60	

=== Assembly Election 1972 ===
1972 Maharashtra Legislative Assembly election : Arvi
Party	Candidate	Votes	%	±%
Independent	Dhairyashilrao Vinayakrao	37,485	49.32%	New
INC	B. M. Deshmukh	27,772	36.54%	▼6.68
Independent	B. Suryabhanji Dharepure	7,657	10.08%	New
Independent	Vithalrao Tukaram Meshram	2,669	3.51%	New
Margin of victory		9,713	12.78%	▼3.28
Turnout		77,989	73.00%	▼2.22
Total valid votes		75,996		
Registered electors		106,831		▲6.84
Independent gain from INC		Swing	▲6.10	

=== Assembly Election 1967 ===
1967 Maharashtra Legislative Assembly election : Arvi
Party	Candidate	Votes	%	±%
INC	Jagjiwan Ganpatrao Kadam	29,537	43.22%	▲5.75
Independent	Z. Z. Dahake	18,562	27.16%	New
Independent	Vithalrao Tukaram Meshram	16,596	24.29%	New
Independent	G. T. Dongre	2,664	3.90%	New
Independent	Hansraj Harising Jadhao	976	1.43%	New
Margin of victory		10,975	16.06%	▲14.30
Turnout		75,214	75.22%	▼0.46
Total valid votes		68,335		
Registered electors		99,992		▲3.19
INC gain from Independent		Swing	▲3.99	

=== Assembly Election 1962 ===
1962 Maharashtra Legislative Assembly election : Arvi
Party	Candidate	Votes	%	±%
Independent	Narayanrao Rajeramji Kale	26,337	39.23%	New
INC	Mahadeo Tukaram Thakre	25,156	37.47%	▼39.45
RPI	Bhagwant Zitruji Babhale	7,247	10.79%	New
Independent	Baliramji Jairamji Jalit	4,590	6.84%	New
Independent	Hansraj Harising Jadhao	3,813	5.68%	New
Margin of victory		1,181	1.76%	▼62.86
Turnout		73,333	75.68%	▲17.46
Total valid votes		67,143		
Registered electors		96,902		▲10.72
Independent gain from INC		Swing	▼37.69	

=== Assembly Election 1957 ===
1957 Bombay State Legislative Assembly election : Arvi
Party	Candidate	Votes	%	±%
INC	Deshmukh Bapurao Marotrao	39,194	76.92%	▲25.46
Independent	Wankhede Wasudeo Suryabhan	6,267	12.30%	New
Independent	Bobde Hanumantrao Tukaram	4,240	8.32%	New
Independent	Tagdichavan Mahadeo Dongya	1,250	2.45%	New
Margin of victory		32,927	64.62%	▲46.23
Turnout		50,951	58.22%	▼4.66
Total valid votes		50,951		
Registered electors		87,522		▲80.77
INC hold		Swing	▲25.46	

=== Assembly Election 1952 ===
1952 Hyderabad State Legislative Assembly election : Arvi
Party	Candidate	Votes	%	±%
INC	Jagjiwan Ganpatrao Kadam	15,667	51.46%	New
Independent	Pandurang Hirsa Sawalkhe	10,069	33.07%	New
Socialist	Shivdas Harbaji Dharaskar	3,229	10.61%	New
Independent	Wasudeo Suryabhan Wankhede	1,184	3.89%	New
Independent	Marotirao Bhomaji Hole	296	0.97%	New
Margin of victory		5,598	18.39%	
Turnout		30,445	62.88%	
Total valid votes		30,445		
Registered electors		48,416		
INC win (new seat)				

== See also ==
- Arvi
- List of constituencies of Maharashtra Vidhan Sabha
