= Hinganghat Assembly constituency =

Constituency of the Maharashtra legislative assembly in India

Coordinates: 20.55°N 78.84°E

Hinganghat
- Constituency No. 46 for the Maharashtra Legislative Assembly

Constituency details
- Country: India
- Region: Western India
- State: Maharashtra
- District: Wardha
- Lok Sabha constituency: Wardha
- Established: 1952
- Total electors: 297,703
- Reservation: None

Member of Legislative Assembly
- 15th Maharashtra Legislative Assembly
- Incumbent Samir Trimbakrao Kunawar
- Party: BJP
- Alliance: NDA
- Elected year: 2024

Hinganghat Assembly constituency is one of the 288 Vidhan Sabha (legislative assembly) constituencies in Maharashtra state in western India. This constituency is one of the four Vidhan Sabha constituencies in the Wardha district.

Hinganghat is part of the Wardha Lok Sabha constituency along with five other Vidhan Sabha segments, namely Wardha, Arvi and Deoli in Wardha district and Morshi and Dhamangaon Railway in the Amravati district.

== Members of the Legislative Assembly ==
Year	Member	Party
1952	Ramkisandas Motilal Mohota	Indian National Congress
1957	Keshavrao Zade	Indian National Congress
1962	Vinayak Chaudhary	Independent politician
1967	Keshavrao Zade	Indian National Congress
1972	Keshavrao Zade	Indian National Congress
1978	Deorao Kolhe	Indian National Congress (I)
1980	Dhanraj Kumbhare	Indian National Congress (I)
1985	Vasant Bonde	Indian Congress (Socialist)
1990	Vasant Bonde	Janata Dal
1995	Ashok Shinde	Shiv Sena
1999	Ashok Shinde	Shiv Sena
2004	Raju alias Mohan Timande	Nationalist Congress Party
2009	Ashok Shinde	Shiv Sena
2014	Samir Kunawar	Bharatiya Janata Party
2019	Samir Kunawar	Bharatiya Janata Party
2024	Samir Kunawar	Bharatiya Janata Party

== Election results ==
=== Assembly Election 2024 ===
2024 Maharashtra Legislative Assembly election : Hinganghat
Party	Candidate	Votes	%	±%
BJP	Samir Trimbakrao Kunawar	114,578	54.27%	▼0.06
NCP-SP	Atul Namdevrao Wandile	84,484	40.02%	New
VBA	Ashwin Tawade	2,865	1.36%	▼2.21
BSP	Pralay Bhaurao Telang	2,362	1.12%	▼1.13
Independent	Raju Alias Mohan Wasudeorao Timande	2,251	1.07%	New
NOTA	None of the Above	2,100	0.99%	▲0.07
Independent	Dr. Umesh Somaji Waware	1,619	0.77%	New
Margin of victory		30,094	14.25%	▼12.21
Turnout		2,13,215	71.62%	▲6.53
Total valid votes		2,11,115		
Registered electors		2,97,703		▲0.53
BJP hold		Swing	▼0.06	

=== Assembly Election 2019 ===
2019 Maharashtra Legislative Assembly election : Hinganghat
Party	Candidate	Votes	%	±%
BJP	Samir Trimbakrao Kunawar	103,585	54.33%	▲6.03
NCP	Raju Alias Mohan Wasudeorao Timande	53,130	27.87%	▲15.52
Independent	Ashok Shamrao Shinde	12,623	6.62%	New
VBA	Dr. Umesh Somaji Waware	6,810	3.57%	New
BSP	Vilas Nanaji Tembhare	4,285	2.25%	▼11.18
GGP	Damadu Warlu Madavi	3,385	1.78%	New
Independent	Anil Atmaram Jawade	2,419	1.27%	New
NOTA	None of the Above	1,764	0.93%	▲0.42
Margin of victory		50,455	26.47%	▼8.40
Turnout		1,92,536	65.02%	▼7.24
Total valid votes		1,90,648		
Registered electors		2,96,130		▲13.47
BJP hold		Swing	▲6.03	

=== Assembly Election 2014 ===
2014 Maharashtra Legislative Assembly election : Hinganghat
Party	Candidate	Votes	%	±%
BJP	Samir Trimbakrao Kunawar	90,275	48.30%	New
BSP	Pralay Bhaurao Telang	25,100	13.43%	▲6.19
NCP	Raju Alias Mohan Wasudeorao Timande	23,083	12.35%	▼11.04
SS	Ashok Shamrao Shinde	21,523	11.52%	▼19.50
INC	Usha Arun Thute	12,645	6.77%	New
MNS	Atul Namdevrao Wandile	7,310	3.91%	New
Independent	Gaju Kubade	1,598	0.85%	New
NOTA	None of the Above	951	0.51%	New
Margin of victory		65,175	34.87%	▲34.01
Turnout		1,87,983	72.03%	▲4.01
Total valid votes		1,86,910		
Registered electors		2,60,968		▲6.70
BJP gain from SS		Swing	▲17.28	

=== Assembly Election 2009 ===
2009 Maharashtra Legislative Assembly election : Hinganghat
Party	Candidate	Votes	%	±%
SS	Ashok Shamrao Shinde	51,285	31.01%	▼4.44
Independent	Samir Trimbakrao Kunawar	49,864	30.15%	New
NCP	Raju Alias Mohan Wasudeorao Timande	38,685	23.39%	▼28.68
BSP	Dhanraj Pannalal Chopada	11,965	7.24%	▲0.45
Independent	Rajendra Daga	4,205	2.54%	New
SBP	Prof. Madhukar Dharmarajji Zoting	2,887	1.75%	New
Independent	Neware Umesh Sadashivrao	1,707	1.03%	New
Margin of victory		1,421	0.86%	▼15.76
Turnout		1,65,366	67.61%	▼1.77
Total valid votes		1,65,361		
Registered electors		2,44,590		▲6.94
SS gain from NCP		Swing	▼21.06	

=== Assembly Election 2004 ===
2004 Maharashtra Legislative Assembly election : Hinganghat
Party	Candidate	Votes	%	±%
NCP	Raju Alias Mohan Wasudeorao Timande	82,630	52.08%	New
SS	Ashok Shamrao Shinde	56,258	35.46%	▼7.73
BSP	Dhanraj Chopda	10,766	6.79%	New
GGP	Kawdu Pandhari Uike	2,843	1.79%	▼0.23
Independent	Ramchandra Sambaji Wankhede	2,694	1.70%	New
Independent	Kumbhare Rajkumar Nilkanth	1,311	0.83%	New
Ambedkarist Republican Party	Wankhede Keruji Baliram	1,001	0.63%	New
Margin of victory		26,372	16.62%	▲6.71
Turnout		1,58,711	69.39%	▲11.12
Total valid votes		1,58,673		
Registered electors		2,28,707		▲6.36
NCP gain from SS		Swing	▲8.89	

=== Assembly Election 1999 ===
1999 Maharashtra Legislative Assembly election : Hinganghat
Party	Candidate	Votes	%	±%
SS	Ashok Shamrao Shinde	54,108	43.19%	▲14.78
Independent	Raju Alias Mohan Wasudeorao Timande	41,690	33.28%	New
RPI	R. M. Patil	14,356	11.46%	New
Independent	Vijay Nagorao Aglawe	7,743	6.18%	New
GGP	Pradeep Ganpatrao Walke	2,529	2.02%	New
Independent	Anil Babarao Bongade	1,590	1.27%	New
Independent	Mirza Parwej Anwar Beg	1,290	1.03%	New
Margin of victory		12,418	9.91%	▲7.33
Turnout		1,33,124	61.91%	▼18.43
Total valid votes		1,25,281		
Registered electors		2,15,031		▲6.58
SS hold		Swing	▲14.78	

=== Assembly Election 1995 ===
1995 Maharashtra Legislative Assembly election : Hinganghat
Party	Candidate	Votes	%	±%
SS	Ashok Shamrao Shinde	43,964	28.41%	▲8.31
Independent	Sharad Joshi	39,971	25.83%	New
INC	Sunil Chandrakantji Raut	22,615	14.62%	▼16.46
BSP	Sidharth Narayan Patil	22,374	14.46%	▲9.46
Independent	Ghorpade Tryanbakrao Alis Motibaba Krushnrao	14,546	9.40%	New
JD	Pandurang Warluji Tulaskar	1,962	1.27%	▼33.06
Independent	Bhaurao Shrawan Telang	1,519	0.98%	New
Margin of victory		3,993	2.58%	▼0.68
Turnout		1,58,501	78.56%	▲9.61
Total valid votes		1,54,735		
Registered electors		2,01,757		▲14.09
SS gain from JD		Swing	▼5.92	

=== Assembly Election 1990 ===
1990 Maharashtra Legislative Assembly election : Hinganghat
Party	Candidate	Votes	%	±%
JD	Vasant Laxmanrao Bonde	40,730	34.33%	New
INC	Suresh Bapuraoji Deshmukh	36,867	31.08%	▼2.08
SS	Ashok Shamrao Shinde	23,847	20.10%	New
BSP	Sidharth Narayan Patil	5,929	5.00%	New
Independent	Shrawan Narayanrao Dhange	4,584	3.86%	New
RPI(K)	Ashok Shivaramji Ramteke	2,184	1.84%	New
Independent	Bhimrao Vithalrao Kapse	1,312	1.11%	New
Margin of victory		3,863	3.26%	▼6.95
Turnout		1,20,666	68.23%	▼0.67
Total valid votes		1,18,633		
Registered electors		1,76,841		▲21.86
JD gain from IC(S)		Swing	▼9.03	

=== Assembly Election 1985 ===
1985 Maharashtra Legislative Assembly election : Hinganghat
Party	Candidate	Votes	%	±%
IC(S)	Vasant Laxmanrao Bonde	42,633	43.36%	New
INC	Suresh Bapuraoji Deshmukh	32,596	33.15%	New
RPI	Mohammad Iqbal Ahmad S/O M. Abdul Wahab	18,037	18.35%	New
Independent	Dnyanesh Wakudkar	1,091	1.11%	New
Independent	Nilkanth Vithobaji Dhanorkar	758	0.77%	New
Independent	D. K. Zade	650	0.66%	New
Margin of victory		10,037	10.21%	▼15.84
Turnout		99,755	68.74%	▲16.51
Total valid votes		98,320		
Registered electors		1,45,113		▲9.45
IC(S) gain from INC(I)		Swing	▼11.71	

=== Assembly Election 1980 ===
1980 Maharashtra Legislative Assembly election : Hinganghat
Party	Candidate	Votes	%	±%
INC(I)	Dhanraj Laxmanrao Kumbhare	37,412	55.07%	▼5.80
INC(U)	Deoraoji Zolbaji Kolhe	19,718	29.02%	New
Independent	Bholanath Lahanuji Sute	9,236	13.59%	New
Independent	Tukaram Pandharinath Bakre	1,573	2.32%	New
Margin of victory		17,694	26.04%	▼12.02
Turnout		69,289	52.26%	▼25.07
Total valid votes		67,939		
Registered electors		1,32,579		▲8.67
INC(I) hold		Swing	▼5.80	

=== Assembly Election 1978 ===
1978 Maharashtra Legislative Assembly election : Hinganghat
Party	Candidate	Votes	%	±%
INC(I)	Deoraoji Zolbaji Kolhe	56,668	60.86%	New
RPI(K)	Pandharinath Vithobaji Hulke	21,226	22.80%	▼3.10
INC	Krishnarao Motiramji Zothing	9,190	9.87%	▼35.42
Independent	Bholanath Lahanuji Sute	3,602	3.87%	New
Independent	Vikram Mahipati Lohkare	1,334	1.43%	New
Independent	Rameshchandra Dharmaji Pise	755	0.81%	New
Margin of victory		35,442	38.07%	▲18.68
Turnout		95,243	78.07%	▲7.35
Total valid votes		93,107		
Registered electors		1,21,997		▲14.15
INC(I) gain from INC		Swing	▲15.58	

=== Assembly Election 1972 ===
1972 Maharashtra Legislative Assembly election : Hinganghat
Party	Candidate	Votes	%	±%
INC	Keshaorao Motiram Zade	33,382	45.29%	▲1.35
RPI(K)	Deoraoji Zholbaji Kolhe	19,092	25.90%	New
AIFB	Pandurang Rewatkar	10,304	13.98%	New
RPI	Vishwanath Lakhaji Bhagat	8,328	11.30%	▼7.71
ABJS	Vithalrao W. kosurkar	2,605	3.53%	New
Margin of victory		14,290	19.39%	▲11.04
Turnout		75,683	70.81%	▼1.49
Total valid votes		73,711		
Registered electors		1,06,876		▲9.94
INC hold		Swing	▲1.35	

=== Assembly Election 1967 ===
1967 Maharashtra Legislative Assembly election : Hinganghat
Party	Candidate	Votes	%	±%
INC	Keshaorao Motiram Zade	30,092	43.94%	▲5.85
Independent	V. M. Chaudhari	24,375	35.59%	New
RPI	I. M. Abdulwahas	13,019	19.01%	New
Independent	N. P. Dhote	1,005	1.47%	New
Margin of victory		5,717	8.35%	▼11.08
Turnout		73,460	75.57%	▼1.98
Total valid votes		68,491		
Registered electors		97,211		▲7.93
INC gain from Independent		Swing	▼13.58	

=== Assembly Election 1962 ===
1962 Maharashtra Legislative Assembly election : Hinganghat
Party	Candidate	Votes	%	±%
Independent	Vinayak Madhaorao Chaudhary	37,523	57.52%	New
INC	Keshaorao Motiram Zade	24,847	38.09%	▼14.43
ABJS	Vasantrao Yeshwantrao Sarode	1,666	2.55%	New
Margin of victory		12,676	19.43%	▲11.48
Turnout		68,684	76.26%	▲2.06
Total valid votes		65,240		
Registered electors		90,070		▲10.10
Independent gain from INC		Swing	▲4.99	

=== Assembly Election 1957 ===
1957 Bombay State Legislative Assembly election : Hinganghat
Party	Candidate	Votes	%	±%
INC	Keshaorao Motiram Zade	30,235	52.52%	▲13.52
Independent	Chawdhari Vinayak Madhaorao	25,660	44.57%	New
Independent	Patil Shaligram Dashrath	1,673	2.91%	New
Margin of victory		4,575	7.95%	▼10.58
Turnout		57,568	70.37%	▲7.82
Total valid votes		57,568		
Registered electors		81,805		▲51.76
INC hold		Swing	▲13.52	

=== Assembly Election 1952 ===
1952 Madhya Pradesh Legislative Assembly election : Hinganghat
Party	Candidate	Votes	%	±%
INC	Ramkisandas Motilal Mohota	13,149	39.00%	New
Independent	Nikantha Morarji Chatwai	6,903	20.47%	New
SCF	Govind Pandu Sakhare	6,289	18.65%	New
	Jogendranath Ishanchandra Majumdar	5,355	15.88%	New
Independent	Balbhadra Sarjuprasad Tiwari	1,006	2.98%	New
Independent	Vishwanath Lakheji Bhagat	612	1.82%	New
Independent	Gopal Sitaram Singroo	404	1.20%	New
Margin of victory		6,246	18.52%	
Turnout		33,718	62.55%	
Total valid votes		33,718		
Registered electors		53,905		
INC win (new seat)				

== See also ==
- Hinganghat
- Samudrapur
- Seloo
- List of constituencies of Maharashtra Vidhan Sabha
