= Dhamangaon Railway Assembly constituency =

Constituency of the Maharashtra legislative assembly in India

Coordinates: 20.785°N 78.138°E

Dhamangaon Railway
- Constituency No. 36 for the Maharashtra Legislative Assembly

Constituency details
- Country: India
- Region: Western India
- State: Maharashtra
- Division: Amravati
- District: Amravati
- Lok Sabha constituency: Wardha
- Established: 2008
- Total electors: 318,103
- Reservation: None

Member of Legislative Assembly
- 15th Maharashtra Legislative Assembly
- Incumbent Pratap Adsad
- Party: BJP
- Alliance: NDA
- Elected year: 2024

Dhamangaon Railway Assembly constituency is one of the 288 Vidhan Sabha (legislative assembly) constituencies in Maharashtra state in western India. This constituency is part of the eight constituencies located in the Amravati district.

Dhamangaon Railway is part of the Wardha Lok Sabha constituency along with five other Vidhan Sabha segments, namely Wardha, Arvi, Deoli and Hinganghat in Wardha district and Morshi in Amravati district. The Dhamangaon Railway constituency was earlier known as the Chandur Railway Constituency before the Delimitation of Constituencies in 2009.

As per orders of Delimitation of Parliamentary and Assembly constituencies Order, 2008, No. 36 Dhamangaon Railway Assembly constituency is composed of the following:

1. Nandgaon-Khandeshwar Tehsil,
2. Chandur Railway Tehsil and
3. Dhamangaon Railway Tehsil of the district.

== Members of the Legislative Assembly ==
Year	Member	Party
from 1952-2008: See Chandur Assembly constituency
1952	Pundalik Balkrishna Chore	Indian National Congress
1957	Pundalik Balkrishna Chore	Indian National Congress
1962	Bhaurao Gulabrao Jadhao	Indian National Congress
1967	Bhaurao Gulabrao Jadhao	Indian National Congress
1972	Sharad Motirao Tasare	Indian National Congress
1978	Sudhakar Ramchandra Savalakhe	Indian National Congress (I)
1980	Yashwant Gangaram Sherekar	Indian National Congress (I)
1985	Yashwant Gangaram Sherekar	Indian National Congress
1990	Arun Adsad	Bharatiya Janata Party
1995	Pandurang Vithusa Dhole	Janata Dal
1999	Arun Adsad	Bharatiya Janata Party
2004	Virendra Jagtap	Indian National Congress
onwards 2008: renamed as Dhamangaon Railway Assembly constituency
2009	Virendra Jagtap	Indian National Congress
2014	Virendra Jagtap	Indian National Congress
2019	Pratap Adsad	Bharatiya Janata Party
2024	Pratap Adsad	Bharatiya Janata Party

== Election results ==
=== Assembly Election 2024 ===
2024 Maharashtra Legislative Assembly election : Dhamangaon Railway
Party	Candidate	Votes	%	±%
BJP	Pratap Arunbhau Adsad	110,641	49.71%	▲6.26
INC	Virendra Walmikrao Jagtap	94,413	42.42%	▲3.52
VBA	Dr. Nilesh Tarachand Vishvkarma	9,784	4.40%	▼6.98
NOTA	None of the Above	768	0.35%	▼0.03
Margin of victory		16,228	7.29%	▲2.74
Turnout		223,343	70.21%	▲3.55
Total valid votes		222,575		
Registered electors		318,103		▲1.08
BJP hold		Swing	▲6.26	

=== Assembly Election 2019 ===
2019 Maharashtra Legislative Assembly election : Dhamangaon Railway
Party	Candidate	Votes	%	±%
BJP	Pratap Arunbhau Adsad	90,832	43.45%	▲8.24
INC	Virendra Walmikrao Jagtap	81,313	38.90%	▲3.20
VBA	Dr. Nilesh Tarachand Vishvkarma	23,779	11.38%	New
Independent	Pravin Dinkarrao Ghuikhedkar	2,668	1.28%	New
Independent	Abhijit Pravin Dhepe	2,553	1.22%	New
BSP	Savita Bhimrao Kataktalware	2,196	1.05%	▼13.67
NOTA	None of the Above	788	0.38%	▲0.10
Margin of victory		9,519	4.55%	▲4.06
Turnout		209,878	66.69%	▼2.02
Total valid votes		209,032		
Registered electors		314,698		▲8.50
BJP gain from INC		Swing	▲7.75	

=== Assembly Election 2014 ===
2014 Maharashtra Legislative Assembly election : Dhamangaon Railway
Party	Candidate	Votes	%	±%
INC	Virendra Walmikrao Jagtap	70,879	35.70%	▼4.22
BJP	Pratap Arunbhau Adsad	69,905	35.21%	▲2.67
BSP	Dhepe Abhijit Pravin	29,229	14.72%	▼1.49
SS	Siddheshwar Raghunathrao Chavan	14,161	7.13%	New
MNS	Dnyneshwar Dhane Patil	3,091	1.56%	▼0.40
CPI	Sharad Shankarrao Surjuse	2,659	1.34%	▼1.90
Independent	Pramod Bhaskarrao Khadse	1,274	0.64%	New
NOTA	None of the Above	558	0.28%	New
Margin of victory		974	0.49%	▼6.89
Turnout		199,150	68.66%	▲1.05
Total valid votes		198,519		
Registered electors		290,053		▲7.27
INC hold		Swing	▼4.22	

=== Assembly Election 2009 ===
2009 Maharashtra Legislative Assembly election : Dhamangaon Railway
Party	Candidate	Votes	%	±%
INC	Virendra Walmikrao Jagtap	72,755	39.93%	New
BJP	Pratap Arunbhau Adsad	59,307	32.55%	New
BSP	Dr. Dhole Pandurang Vithusa	29,544	16.21%	New
CPI	Tukaram Jangalaji Bhasme	5,909	3.24%	New
Independent	Bhaise Vijayrao Yadaoraoji	5,236	2.87%	New
MNS	Pimpale Chandrashekhar Nagorao	3,571	1.96%	New
Independent	Warghat Anil Ramdas	1,699	0.93%	New
Margin of victory		13,448	7.38%	
Turnout		182,286	67.41%	
Total valid votes		182,228		
Registered electors		270,397		
INC win (new seat)				

== See also ==
- Dattapur Dhamangaon
- List of constituencies of Maharashtra Vidhan Sabha
