= Vijay Mude =

Indian politician

Vijay Annaji Mude

Member of Parliament, Lok Sabha
- In office 1996–1998
- Preceded by: Ramchandra Ghangare
- Succeeded by: Datta Meghe
- Constituency: Wardha

Member of Maharashtra Legislative Council
- In office 25 April 1990 – 24 April 1996
- Constituency: elected by Legislative Assembly members

Personal details
- Born: 16 December 1943 Jalgaon.Arvi, Amravati District
- Died: 15 August 2020 (aged 76) Arvi, Wardha district, Maharashtra
- Party: Bhartiya Janata Party
- Spouse: Mandakini Mude (m. 1972–2020)
- Children: 1 son, 4 daughters
- Parent: Annaji Mude (father)
- Education: B.A., B.Ed
- Profession: Agriculturist, Teacher, Politician

Vijay Annaji Mude was an Indian politician affiliated with the Bharatiya Janata Party (BJP). He served as a Member of Parliament in the 11th Lok Sabha from 1996 to 1998, representing the Wardha constituency. Prior to that, he was a member of the Maharashtra Legislative Council from 1990 to 1996. He died on 15 August 2020.
