= Amar Sharadrao Kale =

Indian politician

Member of Parliament, Lok Sabha
- Incumbent
- Assumed office 4 June 2024
- Preceded by: Ramdas Tadas
- Constituency: Wardha

Member of Maharashtra Legislative Assembly
- In office 2004–2009
- Preceded by: Sharadrao Kale
- Succeeded by: Dadarao Keche
- Constituency: Arvi
- In office 2014–2019
- Preceded by: Dadarao Keche
- Succeeded by: Dadarao Keche
- Constituency: Arvi

Personal details
- Born: 13 August 1973 (age 52) Arvi, Maharashtra, India
- Party: NCP(SP) (2024-present)
- Other political affiliations: Indian National Congress (till 2024)
- Spouse: Mayura Amar Kale
- Parent: Sharadrao Kale (father)

Amar Sharadrao Kale is a member of the 18th Lok Sabha. He represents the Wardha Lok Sabha Constituency. He belongs to the Nationalist Congress Party (SharadChandra Pawar) (NCP(SP)).
