= Chandur Assembly constituency =

Former constituency of the Maharashtra legislative assembly in India

Coordinates: 19.020°N 72.843°E

Chandur
- Former constituency for the Maharashtra Legislative Assembly

Constituency details
- Country: India
- Region: Western India
- State: Maharashtra
- Lok Sabha constituency: Amravati
- Established: 1952
- Abolished: 2008

Chandur Vidhan Sabha seat was one of the constituencies of Maharashtra Vidhan Sabha, in India. It was a segment of Amravati Lok Sabha constituency. Chandur seat existed until the 2004 elections after which it was succeeded by Dhamangaon Railway Assembly constituency seat in 2008.

== Members of the Legislative Assembly ==
Year	Member	Party
1952	Pundalik Balkrishna Chore	Indian National Congress
1957	Pundalik Balkrishna Chore	Indian National Congress
1962	Bhaurao Gulabrao Jadhao	Indian National Congress
1967	Bhaurao Gulabrao Jadhao	Indian National Congress
1972	Sharad Motirao Tasare	Indian National Congress
1978	Sudhakar Ramchandra Savalakhe	Indian National Congress (I)
1980	Yashwant Gangaram Sherekar	Indian National Congress (I)
1985	Yashwant Gangaram Sherekar	Indian National Congress
1990	Arun Adsad	Bharatiya Janata Party
1995	Pandurang Vithusa Dhole	Janata Dal
1999	Arun Adsad	Bharatiya Janata Party
onwards 2008: See Dhamangaon Railway Assembly constituency
2004	Virendra Jagtap	Indian National Congress
2009	Virendra Jagtap	Indian National Congress
2014	Virendra Jagtap	Indian National Congress
2019	Pratap Adsad	Bharatiya Janata Party
2024	Pratap Adsad	Bharatiya Janata Party

== Election results ==
=== Assembly Election 2004 ===
2004 Maharashtra Legislative Assembly election : Chandur
Party	Candidate	Votes	%	±%
INC	Virendra Walmikrao Jagtap	45,536	39.81%	▲7.75
BJP	Arun Adsad	32,233	28.18%	▼5.74
BSP	Sunil Babarao Kadu	8,123	7.10%	New
Independent	Nandubhau Kherde	2,594	2.27%	New
Independent	Laxminarayan Durgadasji Chandak	1,340	1.17%	New
Independent	Dhole Pandurang Mahadeo	826	0.72%	New
Independent	Raju Mundada	817	0.71%	New
Margin of victory		13,303	11.63%	▲9.77
Turnout		114,395	70.59%	▲4.54
Total valid votes		114,394		
Registered electors		162,046		▲7.19
INC gain from BJP		Swing	▲5.89	

=== Assembly Election 1999 ===
1999 Maharashtra Legislative Assembly election : Chandur
Party	Candidate	Votes	%	±%
BJP	Arun Adsad	32,252	33.92%	▲3.79
INC	Virendra Walmikrao Jagtap	30,479	32.06%	▲6.95
JD(S)	Dr. Pandurang Dhole	25,492	26.81%	New
Independent	Dhole Pandurang Ramkrushna	5,632	5.92%	New
Independent	Tupsundare Shriram Marotrao	798	0.84%	New
Margin of victory		1,773	1.86%	▼2.20
Turnout		99,847	66.05%	▼12.02
Total valid votes		95,077		
Registered electors		151,179		▲7.41
BJP gain from JD		Swing	▼0.28	

=== Assembly Election 1995 ===
1995 Maharashtra Legislative Assembly election : Chandur
Party	Candidate	Votes	%	±%
JD	Dhole Pandurang Vithusa	36,863	34.20%	▲15.01
BJP	Arun Adsad	32,484	30.13%	▼10.97
INC	Jagtap Virendra Walmik	27,069	25.11%	▼2.14
BSP	Waman Paikaji Shende	4,447	4.13%	▲2.55
Independent	Nandkishor Rambhau Kherde	4,143	3.84%	New
National Republican	Tajane Dulipsing Pandurang	1,407	1.31%	New
Margin of victory		4,379	4.06%	▼9.80
Turnout		109,882	78.07%	▲10.58
Total valid votes		107,795		
Registered electors		140,748		▲6.39
JD gain from BJP		Swing	▼6.90	

=== Assembly Election 1990 ===
1990 Maharashtra Legislative Assembly election : Chandur
Party	Candidate	Votes	%	±%
BJP	Arun Adsad	36,201	41.10%	▲2.90
INC	Sherekar Yeshwant Gangaram	23,997	27.25%	▼16.41
JD	Dube Arun Shridharrao	16,904	19.19%	New
Independent	Pandurang Vithusa Dhole	7,693	8.73%	New
BSP	Devidas Udebhan Kathane	1,389	1.58%	New
Margin of victory		12,204	13.86%	▲8.40
Turnout		89,290	67.49%	▼4.27
Total valid votes		88,078		
Registered electors		132,293		▲26.94
BJP gain from INC		Swing	▼2.56	

=== Assembly Election 1985 ===
1985 Maharashtra Legislative Assembly election : Chandur
Party	Candidate	Votes	%	±%
INC	Sherekar Yashwant Gangaram	32,156	43.66%	New
BJP	Arun Adsad	28,138	38.20%	▲15.65
Independent	Meshram Keshao Haribhau	8,239	11.19%	New
CPI	Deshmukh Shiwaji Surendra	3,202	4.35%	New
RPI	Harichandra Mahadeo Borkar	533	0.72%	▼1.76
Margin of victory		4,018	5.46%	▼31.44
Turnout		74,790	71.76%	▲15.37
Total valid votes		73,651		
Registered electors		104,217		▲4.95
INC gain from INC(I)		Swing	▼15.79	

=== Assembly Election 1980 ===
1980 Maharashtra Legislative Assembly election : Chandur
Party	Candidate	Votes	%	±%
INC(I)	Sherekar Yashwant Gangaram	32,715	59.45%	▼11.56
BJP	Arun Adsad	12,409	22.55%	New
RPI(K)	Borkar Bhalchandra Marotrao	5,482	9.96%	New
INC(U)	Bhaise Shriram Narayan	2,235	4.06%	New
RPI	Gawai Uttamrao Jangu	1,362	2.48%	New
Independent	Mohod Uttam Sudam	687	1.25%	New
Margin of victory		20,306	36.90%	▼17.03
Turnout		55,992	56.39%	▼23.73
Total valid votes		55,029		
Registered electors		99,298		▲5.36
INC(I) hold		Swing	▼11.56	

=== Assembly Election 1978 ===
1978 Maharashtra Legislative Assembly election : Chandur
Party	Candidate	Votes	%	±%
INC(I)	Savalakhe Sudhakar Ramchandra	52,622	71.01%	New
JP	Arun Adsad	12,656	17.08%	New
INC	Tasare Sharad Motiram	4,552	6.14%	▼65.40
Independent	More Fattehsingh Bhimrao	2,087	2.82%	New
Independent	Choube Ramchandra Jagadatta	672	0.91%	New
Independent	Thombare Ambadas Sadashiv	619	0.84%	New
Independent	Deshmukh Kashinath Vishwanath	496	0.67%	New
Margin of victory		39,966	53.93%	▼8.75
Turnout		75,512	80.12%	▲12.52
Total valid votes		74,109		
Registered electors		94,243		▼8.54
INC(I) gain from INC		Swing	▼0.53	

=== Assembly Election 1972 ===
1972 Maharashtra Legislative Assembly election : Chandur
Party	Candidate	Votes	%	±%
INC	Sharad Motirao Tasare	48,403	71.54%	▲28.00
ABJS	Ganpat Balaji Pole	5,993	8.86%	▼7.28
RPI	Krishna Manik Thaware	4,876	7.21%	▼20.35
Independent	Punsurang Punaji Tajane	4,141	6.12%	New
RPI(K)	Mahadeo Gokhalu Kamble	1,773	2.62%	New
CPI	Ramdas Sakharam Palekar	1,053	1.56%	▼11.20
Margin of victory		42,410	62.68%	▲46.70
Turnout		69,654	67.60%	▼6.73
Total valid votes		67,656		
Registered electors		103,046		▲8.10
INC hold		Swing	▲28.00	

=== Assembly Election 1967 ===
1967 Maharashtra Legislative Assembly election : Chandur
Party	Candidate	Votes	%	±%
INC	Bhaurao Gulabrao Jadhao	28,427	43.54%	▼7.58
RPI	F. B. More	17,993	27.56%	New
ABJS	M. J. Bassod	10,539	16.14%	New
CPI	S. V. Nahate	8,333	12.76%	▼18.63
Margin of victory		10,434	15.98%	▼3.75
Turnout		70,855	74.33%	▼1.66
Total valid votes		65,292		
Registered electors		95,329		▲12.98
INC hold		Swing	▼7.58	

=== Assembly Election 1962 ===
1962 Maharashtra Legislative Assembly election : Chandur
Party	Candidate	Votes	%	±%
INC	Bhaurao Gulabrao Jadhao	31,025	51.12%	▲3.94
CPI	Wamanrao Deshmukh Alias Sudan Dattatraya	19,052	31.39%	▼0.67
ABJS	Janardan Eknath Adsad	6,908	11.38%	New
Independent	Laxman Pandurang Deshmukh	2,261	3.73%	New
Independent	Pandurang Punaji Tajane	1,442	2.38%	New
Margin of victory		11,973	19.73%	▲4.62
Turnout		64,122	75.99%	▲11.86
Total valid votes		60,688		
Registered electors		84,380		▲10.89
INC hold		Swing	▲3.94	

=== Assembly Election 1957 ===
1957 Bombay State Legislative Assembly election : Chandur
Party	Candidate	Votes	%	±%
INC	Chore Pundalik Balkrishna	23,021	47.18%	▲7.02
CPI	Nahate Sumersingh Vithalsingh	15,647	32.06%	New
Independent	Bhoyar Ramkrishna Narayan	10,131	20.76%	New
Margin of victory		7,374	15.11%	▼4.47
Turnout		48,799	64.13%	▲2.73
Total valid votes		48,799		
Registered electors		76,091		▲79.08
INC hold		Swing	▲7.02	

=== Assembly Election 1952 ===
1952 Hyderabad State Legislative Assembly election : Chandur
Party	Candidate	Votes	%	±%
INC	Chore Pundalik Balkrishna	10,479	40.16%	New
Independent	Shankarrao Gulabrao Dighde	5,370	20.58%	New
Independent	Yeshwantrao Bhopatrao Sarad	5,057	19.38%	New
SCF	Ramdas Parnu Bhagat	3,527	13.52%	New
Socialist	Shrihari Vithoba Kherde	1,414	5.42%	New
Independent	Mahadeo Undraji Yewale	243	0.93%	New
Margin of victory		5,109	19.58%	
Turnout		26,090	61.40%	
Total valid votes		26,090		
Registered electors		42,490		
INC win (new seat)				

== See also ==
- List of constituencies of Maharashtra Legislative Assembly
