= Arun Adsad =

Indian politician

Member of Maharashtra Legislative Council
- In office 24 September 2018 – 24 April 2020
- Preceded by: Pandurang Fundkar
- Succeeded by: Pravin Datke
- Constituency: elected by Members of Legislative Assembly

Member of Maharashtra Legislative Assembly
- In office 1999–2004
- Preceded by: Pandurang Dhole
- Succeeded by: Virendra Jagtap
- Constituency: Chandur
- In office 1990–1995
- Preceded by: Yashwant Sherekar
- Succeeded by: Pandurang Dhole
- Constituency: Chandur

Personal details
- Born: 1 July 1946 (age 79) Dattapur Dhamangaon, Dist.Amravati District
- Party: Bharatiya Janata Party
- Spouse: Pratibha Adsad
- Children: Pratap Adsad, Archana Adsad & Arati Adsad

Arun Janardanrao Adsad was the two term member of the Maharashtra Legislative Assembly for Chandur constituency, now known as Dhamangaon Railway.

== Political career ==
Arun Adsad is a member of the Rashtriya Swayamsevak Sangh (RSS), since his childhood a far-right Hindu nationalist paramilitary volunteer organisation.
