= 97th Marathi Sahitya Sammelan =

97th Akhil Bharatiya Marathi Sahitya Sammelan
- Date: 2–5 February 2024
- Venue: Sane Guruji Sahitya Nagari, Pratap College
- Locations: Amalner, Maharashtra
- Country: India
- Previous event: 96th
- Next event: 98th
- President: Ravindra Shobhane
- Organiser: Akhil Bharatiya Marathi Sahitya Mahamandal

The 97th Akhil Bharatiya Marathi Sahitya Sammelan was the three-day conference of Marathi Sahitya Mahamandal which held at Amalner in Jalgaon district, marks for the second time in Amalner since 1952.

== Presidency ==
Usha Tambe announced the president for 97th conference of Ravindra Shobhane in a press conference held on June 25, 2023 in Pune. The 97th edition of the conference marks the second time it is being held in Amalner, the first having taken place in 1952 under the chairmanship of Krushnaji Pandurang Kulkarni, and the second under the presidency of Shobhane.

== Preparations ==
The conference was set to take plae in Amalner, Jalgaon district, as confirmed during the Sahitya Mahamandal meeting on April 23, 2023, in Pune. While Satara in western Maharashtra, Audumbar in Sangli district, Amalner in Jalgaon district, and Jalna in Marathwada region were considered as potential locations, Amalner has ultimately been chosen.

A Sane Guruji Sahitya Nagari was set up at Pratap College in Amalner for the conference. Planning of different halls, leveling of the site for construction of book exhibition hall, construction of internal roads in the area, construction of toilets, arrangement of parking lot were also done.

== Conference ==
The program was organized in Amalner from 2 to 4 February. On the morning of the first day of conference at 07:30, Granth Dindi (procession of famous literary works) was taken out in Amalner. Many writers participated in the Granth Dindi. Granth Dindi was taken out with great fanfare in the presence of industrialist Ashok Jain.

On February 2, Usha Tambe inaugurated the flag hoisting and the library house. A library was inaugurated by former president of Akhil Bharatiya Marathi Sahitya Sammelan, Narendra Chapalgaonkar. The conference was inaugurated by Sumitra Mahajan.

== Participating leaders ==
- Neelam Gorhe
- Deepak Kesarkar
- Gulabrao Patil
- Anil Patil
- Unmesh Patil
- Ayush Prasad
- Ujjwala Mehendale
- Dr. Avinash Joshi
- Rajesh Pandey

Maharashtra chief minister Eknath Shinde participated in the meeting live from Mumbai through audio-visual online system.

== Promises ==
Chief Minister Eknath Shinde had promised that the Maharashtra Government will extend its full support to ensure that the 100th Sahitya Sammelan is organized on a grand scale, achieving global recognition.
