= Morshi Assembly constituency =

Constituency of the Maharashtra legislative assembly in India

Coordinates: 21.329°N 78.009°E

Morshi
- Constituency No. 43 for the Maharashtra Legislative Assembly

Constituency details
- Country: India
- Region: Western India
- State: Maharashtra
- District: Amravati
- Lok Sabha constituency: Wardha
- Established: 1952
- Total electors: 291,492
- Reservation: None

Member of Legislative Assembly
- 15th Maharashtra Legislative Assembly
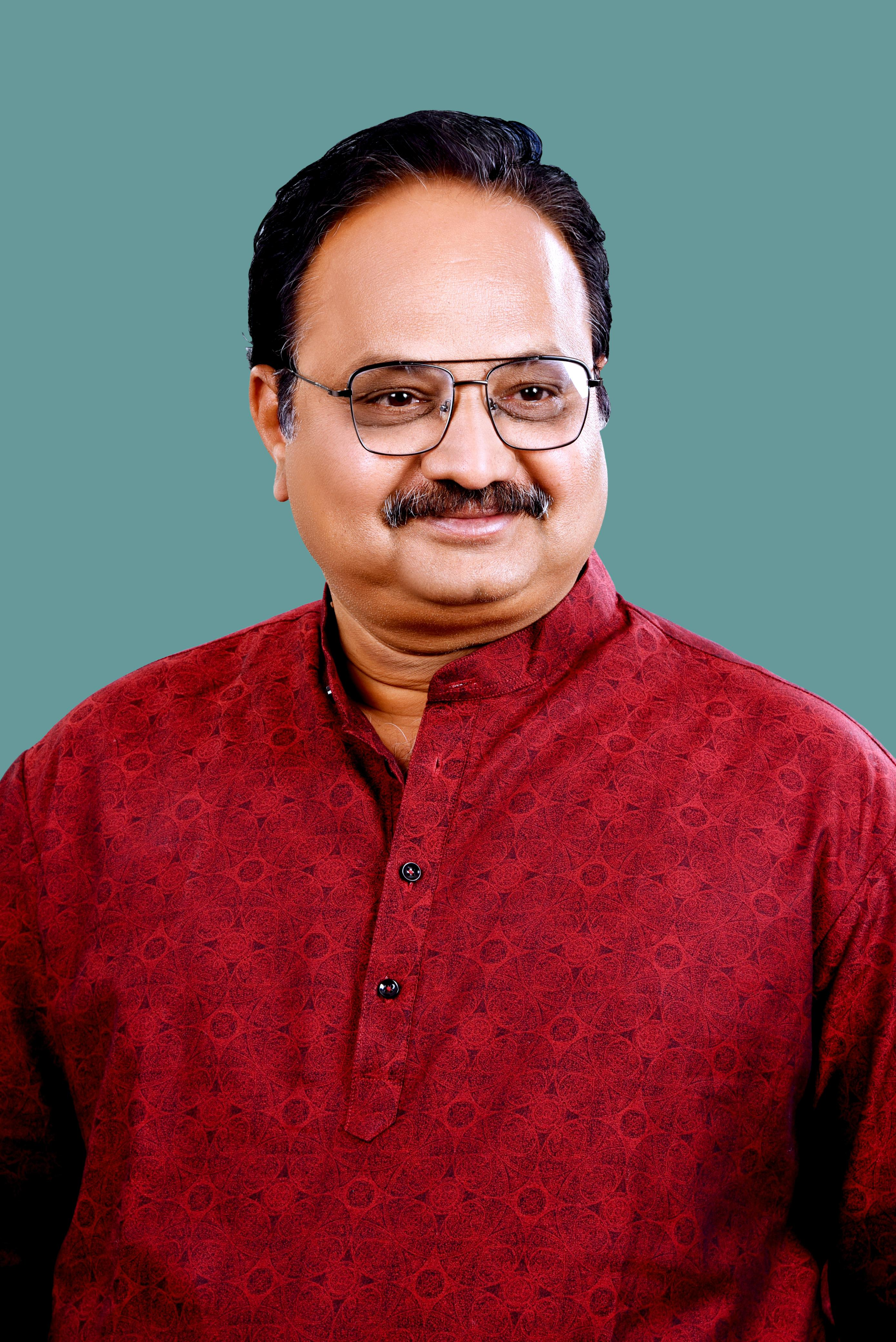
- Incumbent Umesh alias "Chandu" Atmaramji Yawalkar
- Party: BJP
- Alliance: NDA
- Elected year: 2024

Morshi Assembly constituency is one of the 288 Vidhan Sabha (legislative assembly) constituencies in Maharashtra state in western India. This constituency is one of the eight constituencies located in Amravati district.

Morshi is part of the Wardha Lok Sabha constituency along with five other Vidhan Sabha constituencies, namely Wardha, Arvi, Deoli and Hinganghat in Wardha district and Dhamangaon Railway in Amravati district.

As per orders of Delimitation of Parliamentary and Assembly constituencies Order, 2008, No. 43 Morshi Assembly constituency is composed of the following: 1. Warud Tehsil, 2. Morshi Tehsil (Part), Revenue Circle-Ambada, Hiwarkhed, Rithpur, Morshi and Morshi (MC) of the district.

== Members of the Legislative Assembly ==
Year	Member	Party
1952	Punjabrao Balkrishna Sadatpure	Independent politician
1957	Hirabai Anandrao Salao	Indian National Congress
1962	Pratapsinh Deshmukh	Independent
1967	K. W. Waman	Indian National Congress
1972	Malhar Mahulkar	Indian National Congress
1978	Mahadeorao Ande	Indian National Congress (I)
1980	Kokilabai Gawande	Indian National Congress (I)
1985	Purshottam Mankar	Indian National Congress
1990	Harshavardhan Pratapsinh Deshmukh	Independent
1995	Harshavardhan Pratapsinh Deshmukh	Indian National Congress
1999	Nareshchandra Thakare Patil	Indian National Congress
2004	Harshavardhan Pratapsinh Deshmukh	Jan Surajya Shakti
2009	Anil Bonde	Independent
2014	Anil Bonde	Bharatiya Janata Party
2019	Devendra Bhuyar	Swabhimani Paksha
2024	Chandu Yawalkar	Bharatiya Janata Party

== Election results ==
=== Assembly Election 2024 ===
2024 Maharashtra Legislative Assembly election : Morshi
Party	Candidate	Votes	%	±%
BJP	Chandu Atmaramji Yawalkar	99,683	47.62	▲2.22
NCP	Devendra Mahadevrao Bhuyar	34,695	16.58	New
NCP-SP	Girish Rangrao Karale	31,843	15.21	New
Independent	Vikram Nareshchandraji Thakare	26,729	12.77	New
BSP	Kamalnarayan Janrao Uike	4,122	1.97	▲0.59
ASP(KR)	Sushil Sureshrao Bele	4,052	1.94	New
Independent	Suhasrao Vitthalrao Thakare	1,493	0.71	New
NOTA	None of the Above	758	0.36	▼0.57
Margin of victory		64,988	31.05	▲25.90
Turnout		210,069	72.07	▲6.14
Total valid votes		209,311		
Registered electors		291,492		▲0.63
BJP gain from SWP		Swing	▼2.93	

=== Assembly Election 2019 ===
2019 Maharashtra Legislative Assembly election : Morshi
Party	Candidate	Votes	%	±%
SWP	Devendra Mahadevrao Bhuyar	96,152	50.55	New
BJP	Dr. Anil Sukhdeorao Bonde	86,361	45.40	▲6.46
BSP	Bhajikhaye Rajendra Sheshrao	2,629	1.38	▼5.61
GGP	Chandrakant Vasantrao Kumare	1,774	0.93	New
NOTA	None of the Above	1,769	0.93	▲0.54
Margin of victory		9,791	5.15	▼16.70
Turnout		191,986	66.28	▼3.52
Total valid votes		190,205		
Registered electors		289,657		▲8.99
SWP gain from BJP		Swing	▲11.60	

=== Assembly Election 2014 ===
2014 Maharashtra Legislative Assembly election : Morshi
Party	Candidate	Votes	%	±%
BJP	Dr. Anil Sukhdeorao Bonde	71,611	38.95	▲29.71
NCP	Harshwardhan Pratapsinh Deshmukh	31,449	17.10	▼5.72
INC	Nareshchandra Patil	30,207	16.43	New
SS	Chandu Atmaramji Yawalkar	27,122	14.75	New
BSP	Dr. Mrudula Shreekant Patil (Dharme)	12,852	6.99	▼4.09
Independent	Chandrakant Vasantrao Kumre	2,206	1.20	New
Independent	Anil Uttamrao Khandekar	1,524	0.83	New
NOTA	None of the Above	717	0.39	New
Margin of victory		40,162	21.84	▲18.19
Turnout		184,672	69.48	▲0.58
Total valid votes		183,867		
Registered electors		265,773		▲10.26
BJP gain from Independent		Swing	▲12.40	

=== Assembly Election 2009 ===
2009 Maharashtra Legislative Assembly election : Morshi
Party	Candidate	Votes	%	±%
Independent	Dr. Anil Sukhdeorao Bonde	43,905	26.55	New
Independent	Nareshchandra Panjabrao Thakare Patil	37,870	22.90	New
NCP	Harshwardhan Pratapsinh Deshmukh	37,748	22.83	New
BSP	Ashok Haribhau Rode	18,325	11.08	▼7.27
BJP	Sahebrao Ramchandr Tatte	15,276	9.24	New
Independent	Baraskar Tarabai Gulab	2,134	1.29	New
Independent	Anil Uttamrao Khandekar	1,635	0.99	New
Margin of victory		6,035	3.65	▲2.60
Turnout		165,386	68.61	▼3.69
Total valid votes		165,357		
Registered electors		241,052		▲31.97
Independent gain from JSS		Swing	▼1.11	

=== Assembly Election 2004 ===
2004 Maharashtra Legislative Assembly election : Morshi
Party	Candidate	Votes	%	±%
JSS	Harshwardhan Pratapsinh Deshmukh	36,524	27.66	New
SS	Dr. Anil Sukhdeorao Bonde	35,143	26.62	▼6.59
INC	Nareshchandra Panjabrao Thakare Patil	27,573	20.88	▼14.91
BSP	Dilip Laxmanrao Bhoyar	24,233	18.35	▲16.70
Independent	Sanjay Atmaramji Yawalkar	2,727	2.07	New
Independent	Somkuwar Shridhar Dayaram	2,475	1.87	New
Independent	Atmaram Kanhaiya Niswade	1,789	1.35	New
Margin of victory		1,381	1.05	▼1.54
Turnout		132,061	72.30	▲12.37
Total valid votes		132,036		
Registered electors		182,655		▲4.85
JSS gain from INC		Swing	▼8.13	

=== Assembly Election 1999 ===
1999 Maharashtra Legislative Assembly election : Morshi
Party	Candidate	Votes	%	±%
INC	Nareshchandra Panjabrao Thakare Patil	37,362	35.79	▼6.76
SS	Sanjay Atmaram Yawalkar	34,659	33.21	▲31.81
NCP	Harshvardhan Pratapsinh Deshmukh	30,056	28.80	New
BSP	Arun Warghat	1,726	1.65	▼9.96
Margin of victory		2,703	2.59	▼8.63
Turnout		108,789	62.45	▼10.51
Total valid votes		104,378		
Registered electors		174,211		▲2.91
INC hold		Swing	▼6.76	

=== Assembly Election 1995 ===
1995 Maharashtra Legislative Assembly election : Morshi
Party	Candidate	Votes	%	±%
INC	Harshwardhan Pratapsinha Deshmukh	50,739	42.56	▲14.12
Independent	Purshottam Gulabrao Mankar	37,359	31.34	New
BSP	Vinaykumar Baliram Farkade	13,848	11.62	▲9.02
JD	Madhukar Shamrao Dafe	5,307	4.45	▲2.41
SS	Pradip Shriram Khawale	1,667	1.40	▼15.99
Samajwadi Janata Party (Maharashtra)	Tarar Ashatai Vijay	1,287	1.08	New
Margin of victory		13,380	11.22	▼1.12
Turnout		121,447	71.74	▲2.57
Total valid votes		119,223		
Registered electors		169,282		▲23.20
INC gain from Independent		Swing	▲1.78	

=== Assembly Election 1990 ===
1990 Maharashtra Legislative Assembly election : Morshi
Party	Candidate	Votes	%	±%
Independent	Harshwardhan Pratapsinh Deshmukh	38,014	40.77	New
INC	Purushottam Gulabrao Mankar	26,509	28.43	▼11.09
SS	Ashok Jesiram Khawale	16,216	17.39	New
Independent	Pandurang Teji Mahajan	5,982	6.42	New
BSP	Yeshwant Krushnarao Saratkar	2,418	2.59	New
JD	Yawalkar Kumud Keshaorao	1,901	2.04	New
INS(SCS)	Deshmukh Nagorao Janrao	916	0.98	New
Margin of victory		11,505	12.34	▲9.12
Turnout		94,454	68.74	▲3.68
Total valid votes		93,233		
Registered electors		137,403		▲26.06
Independent gain from INC		Swing	▲1.25	

=== Assembly Election 1985 ===
1985 Maharashtra Legislative Assembly election : Morshi
Party	Candidate	Votes	%	±%
INC	Purushottam Gulabrao Mankar	27,651	39.53	New
IC(S)	Daulatrao Laxmanrao Thakre	25,401	36.31	New
Independent	Jatarkhau Fattekhau	12,896	18.44	New
Independent	Bhaurao Shamrao Bhujade	1,416	2.02	New
Margin of victory		2,250	3.22	▼12.21
Turnout		71,260	65.38	▲13.62
Total valid votes		69,953		
Registered electors		108,999		▲8.67
INC gain from INC(I)		Swing	▼12.85	

=== Assembly Election 1980 ===
1980 Maharashtra Legislative Assembly election : Morshi
Party	Candidate	Votes	%	±%
INC(I)	Kokilabai Jangannath Gawande	26,561	52.38	▼14.93
INC(U)	Harshwardhan Pratapsinh Deshmukh	18,737	36.95	New
Independent	Bhaurao Shamrao Bhujade	5,413	10.67	New
Margin of victory		7,824	15.43	▼38.00
Turnout		51,527	51.37	▼25.32
Total valid votes		50,711		
Registered electors		100,306		▲6.68
INC(I) hold		Swing	▼14.93	

=== Assembly Election 1978 ===
1978 Maharashtra Legislative Assembly election : Morshi
Party	Candidate	Votes	%	±%
INC(I)	Manadeorao Sadashio Ande	48,012	67.30	New
JP	Girish Maniklalji Gandhi	9,895	13.87	New
Independent	Nagorao Janrao Deshmukh	6,868	9.63	New
INC	Malharrao Ganpatrao Mahulkar	3,263	4.57	▼69.28
PWPI	Nareshchandra Panjabrao Thakare Patil	2,382	3.34	New
Independent	Bhujade Bhaurao Shamrao	917	1.29	New
Margin of victory		38,117	53.43	▼7.77
Turnout		73,552	78.23	▲13.58
Total valid votes		71,337		
Registered electors		94,022		▼5.66
INC(I) gain from INC		Swing	▼6.55	

=== Assembly Election 1972 ===
1972 Maharashtra Legislative Assembly election : Morshi
Party	Candidate	Votes	%	±%
INC	Malhar Ganpat Mahulkar	45,850	73.86	▲24.68
Independent	Atamaram R. Yawalkar	7,852	12.65	New
RPI	Narayan Panduji Nimbalkar	4,877	7.86	▼7.24
Independent	Namdeo Maroti Patila	3,502	5.64	New
Margin of victory		37,998	61.21	▲29.70
Turnout		64,054	64.27	▼2.11
Total valid votes		62,081		
Registered electors		99,667		▲11.87
INC hold		Swing	▲24.68	

=== Assembly Election 1967 ===
1967 Maharashtra Legislative Assembly election : Morshi
Party	Candidate	Votes	%	±%
INC	K. W. Waman	28,209	49.17	▲13.32
CPI	N. D. Nangle	10,137	17.67	New
Independent	N. J. Deshmikh	9,388	16.36	New
RPI	P. D. Ramteke	8,660	15.10	New
Independent	M. J. Kanate	973	1.70	New
Margin of victory		18,072	31.50	▲8.70
Turnout		62,112	69.72	▼10.11
Total valid votes		57,367		
Registered electors		89,088		▲9.78
INC gain from Independent		Swing	▼9.48	

=== Assembly Election 1962 ===
1962 Maharashtra Legislative Assembly election : Morshi
Party	Candidate	Votes	%	±%
Independent	Partapsinh Shankarrao Deshmukh	35,464	58.66	New
INC	Laxmanrao Raghunathrao Tarar	21,677	35.85	▼3.98
Independent	Sarjerao Gandelal Dawande	2,114	3.50	New
Independent	Rambhau Vishwanathrao Gharpure	609	1.01	New
Independent	Wasantibai Shriram Malwiya	598	0.99	New
Margin of victory		13,787	22.80	▲21.08
Turnout		65,547	80.77	▲0.67
Total valid votes		60,462		
Registered electors		81,148		▲10.80
Independent gain from INC		Swing	▲18.82	

=== Assembly Election 1957 ===
1957 Bombay State Legislative Assembly election : Morshi
Party	Candidate	Votes	%	±%
INC	Hirabai Anandrao Salao	21,540	39.83	▲10.49
Independent	Pratapsinh Shankarrao Deshmukh	20,606	38.11	New
CPI	Naththu Dewaji Mangle	7,805	14.43	New
PSP	Ramkrishna Gangaramji Thoke	1,870	3.46	New
Independent	Rajdarkhan Jabbarkhan	1,678	3.10	New
Independent	Zanwar Kashiram Murlidhar	575	1.06	New
Margin of victory		934	1.73	▼12.68
Turnout		54,074	73.84	▲15.59
Total valid votes		54,074		
Registered electors		73,235		▲72.03
INC gain from Independent		Swing	▼3.91	

=== Assembly Election 1952 ===
1952 Madhya Pradesh Legislative Assembly election : Morshi
Party	Candidate	Votes	%	±%
Independent	Punjabrao Balkrishna Sadatpure	10,847	43.75	New
INC	Anandrao Yadeorao Solay	7,275	29.34	New
SCF	Parshya Dayaram Ramteke	3,449	13.91	New
KMPP	Laxmanrao Bhivaji Tayade	2,652	10.70	New
Independent	Sarswatibai Malvi	571	2.30	New
Margin of victory		3,572	14.41	
Turnout		24,794	58.24	
Total valid votes		24,794		
Registered electors		42,570		
Independent win (new seat)				

== See also ==
- Warud
- List of constituencies of Maharashtra Vidhan Sabha
