= Dadarao Keche =

Indian politician

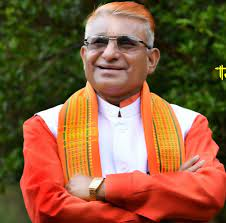

Member of Maharashtra Legislative Council
- Incumbent
- Assumed office 20 March 2025
- Preceded by: Gopichand Padalkar
- Constituency: elected by the Members of Legislative Assembly

Member of Maharashtra Legislative Assembly
- In office 2019–2024
- Preceded by: Amar Kale
- Succeeded by: Sumit Wankhede
- Constituency: Arvi
- In office 2009–2014
- Preceded by: Amar Kale
- Succeeded by: Amar Kale
- Constituency: Arvi

Personal details
- Born: Dadarao Yadavraoji Keche; 5 April 1954 (age 71) Arvi, Wardha District
- Political party: Bharatiya Janata Party
- Profession: Politician

Dadarao Yadavraoji Keche is an Indian politician currently serving as Vice President of Bharatiya Janata Party, Maharashtra. He was a Member of Maharashtra Legislative Assembly from Arvi Assembly constituency in 2009 & 2019 election.

In the 2019 Maharashtra Legislative Assembly election, he beat Kale Amar Sharadrao with the margin of 12,467 votes. In April 2020, he broke the COVID-19 lockdown rules in India by celebrating his birthday with 200 people for which a First information report was registered against him.

== Career ==
Dadarao Keche is a two-term Member Of Maharashtra Legislative Assembly (MLA) from Arvi Assembly constituency. In 2019 Maharashtra Legislative Assembly Election, he defeated the then sitting MLA from Arvi Assembly constituency, Amar Sharadrao Kale.

Keche is now serving as State Vice President of Bharatiya Janata Party, Maharashtra since November 2024.
