= Pankaj Rajesh Bhoyar =

Indian politician

Minister of state Government of Maharashtra
- Incumbent
- Assumed office 15 December 2024
- Chief Minister: Devendra Fadnavis
- Department: Home; Housing; School Education; Co-operation; Mining
- Guardian minister: Wardha district

Member of Maharashtra Legislative Assembly
- Incumbent
- Assumed office 2014
- Preceded by: Suresh Deshmukh
- Constituency: Wardha

Personal details
- Born: 5 January 1977 (age 49) Wardha, Maharashtra, India
- Party: Bharatiya Janata Party (2014–present)
- Other political affiliations: Indian National Congress (Till 2014)
- Spouse: Shital Bhoyar
- Children: Akanksha Bhoyar, Aditya Bhoyar
- Education: B.Sc, M.A. (Economics), PhD

Dr.Pankaj Rajesh Bhoyar is a member of the 13th Maharashtra Legislative Assembly. He represents the Wardha Assembly Constituency. He belongs to the Bharatiya Janata Party. Bhoyar's election victory has resulted in BJP winning two seats in Wardha district for the first time ever. In 2014, Bhoyar has been a newcomer to the BJP, and is considered as being from the Datta Meghe group. Bhoyar has been president of Wardha district Indian Youth Congress.
