= Virendra Jagtap =

Indian politician

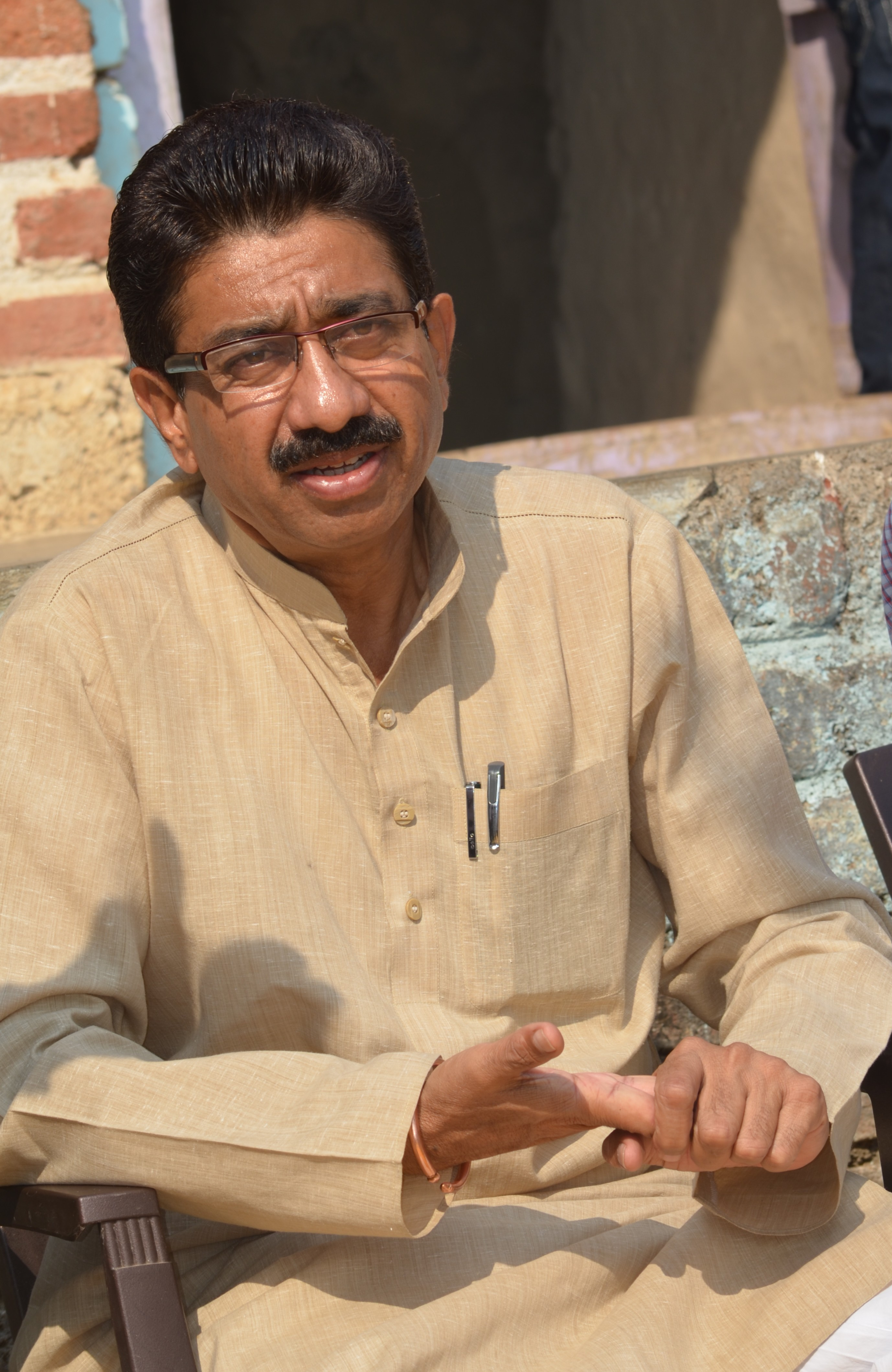

Member of the Maharashtra Legislative Assembly
- In office (2009-2014), (2014 – 2019)
- Succeeded by: Pratap Adsad
- Constituency: Dhamangaon Railway
- In office (2004–2009)
- Preceded by: Arun Adsad
- Constituency: Chandur

Personal details
- Born: 11 August 1963 (age 63) Wardha, Maharashtra, India
- Party: Indian National Congress
- Spouse: Uttara V. Jagtap
- Children: Parikshit V. Jagtap
- Education: G. S. College of Commerce, Wardha
- Website: http://virendrajagtap.in/

Virendra Walmikrao Jagtap (born 11 August 1963) is a member of the Indian National Congress Party, he was elected continuously for the third time as the member of Maharashtra Vidhan Sabha representing the erstwhile Chandur Constituency & Dhamangaon constituency. He was previously the president of Amravati District Congress Committee (Rural) and served as the Chairperson of the Employment Guarantee Scheme (EGS) Committee of the Maharashtra Legislature.

== Early life ==
Virendra Jagtap was born to Prof. Walmikrao Jagtap and Dr. Sulbha Jagtap on 11 August 1963, at Wardha, Maharashtra.

He graduated from G. S. College of Commerce, Wardha, with a degree of B.Com. in 1984 and completed his Master's in Commerce (M.Com.) from University of Nagpur in 1986 and received the gold medal for obtaining 1st rank in Nagpur University. Later he completed MPhil in 1989. From 1989 he worked as Professor at Science, Arts and Commerce College Arvi, Wardha, Maharashtra.

== Political career ==
He served as the University representative of G. S. College of Commerce Wardha and led a protest march of students on Nagpur University. The protesters were arrested and jailed for three days. During his early college days he joined NSUI the students wing of the Indian National Congress. He served as the President of Wardha District NSUI and later became General Secretary of Maharashtra NSUI from 1988 to 1992. Later he went on to become the Maharashtra state General Secretary of Indian Youth Congress in 1992 and Vice-President from 1995 to 1998.

He served as the Chairman of Chandur Rly. Taluka, Sale Purchase Society in 1995. He organized Congress membership drive, Blood donation camps and led the protest march of flood affected farmers on Chandur Tehsil in 1994.

He contested the Legislative Assembly election for the first time in 1995 and again in 1999 from Chandur constituency on behalf of Indian National Congress.

He won the election for the first time in 2004 from Chandur constituency and fetched the seat for his party after a gap of 15 years. He retained his seat in 2009 elections by winning the seat from the delimited Dhamangaon Railway Constituency. He managed to retain his seat for the third consecutive term in the 2014 elections. He was appointed chairman of Amravati District Congress Committee (Rural) from 2006 till 2011. Under his leadership, the party won maximum number of seats in Amravati Zilla Parishad elections in 2007. In the 2009 Assembly seats the party won 4 out of the 5 seats contested.

== Posts held ==
- 2004-2019 Member of Maharashtra Legislative Assembly for Chandur and Dhamangaon Railway Constituency
- 2006-2011 President, Amravati District (Rural) Congress Committee
- 2011-2020 Director, Amravati District Central Co-operative Bank
- 2009-2012 President, Maharashtra Legislature Committee on Employment Guarantee Scheme
- 1995-1998 Vice President, Maharashtra State Youth Congress
- 1992-1995 General Secretary, Maharashtra State Youth Congress
- 1988-1992 General Secretary, Maharashtra State NSUI
- 1986-1988 President, Wardha District NSUI

== Developmental Work ==
During his tenure as MLA, his focus has been on developing irrigation facilities in his constituency which is rural and depends on agriculture. He was instrumental in sanctioning work for strengthening and re carpeting of Canal network of Upper Wardha Dam in Dhamangaon and parts of Chandur Taluka. He has been successful in sanctioning and completing work of different irrigation projects namely Songaon Shivni Prakalp, Raigad Nadi Prakalp and Pathargao Upsa Sinchan Yojna in Chandur Railway Taluka and Sakhali Prakalp, Nimn Sakhali Prakalp, Ganeshpur and Timtala Prakalp in Nandgao Khandeshwar taluka. Construction of Taluka Krida Sankuls, Govt. Hostels for Students, Aadivasi Boarding Schools has been completed during his tenure. Newer buildings for Primary Health Centres, Aaganwaris, Construction of Govt Hospital at Dhamangao and Trauma Care centre at Nandgao Khandeshwar has been the highlight of his work in the field of healthcare. He has also repaired many parts of Zilla Parishad Schools in his constituency. He had also organized a free treatment camp for chikungunya pandemic disease for around 19,000 patients during the pandemic in 2005-06. Apart from this, major flyovers have been constructed in Dhamangaon, in his tenure as a member of a legislative assembly and one is underway at Chandur Railway.
