= Devendra Mahadevrao Bhuyar =

Indian politician

Member of Maharashtra Legislative Assembly
- In office 24 October 2019 – 26 November 2024
- Preceded by: Anil Sukhdevrao Bonde
- Succeeded by: Chandu Atmaramji Yawalkar
- Constituency: Morshi

Personal details
- Party: Nationalist Congress Party (NCP) (2024-Present)
- Other political affiliations: Swabhimani Shetkari Sangathan (SWP) (2004-2024)

Devendra Mahadevrao Bhuyar is an Indian politician in the Nationalist Congress Party (NCP). He is a former member of the Maharashtra Legislative Assembly from Morshi - Warud Assembly Constituency from 24 October 2019 till 24 November 2024.

He shot to limelight as he defeated two term MLA Dr. Anil Bonde, a leader of Bharatiya Janata Party, former Agriculture Minister of Maharashtra state & national general secretary of B.J.P. Kisan morcha.

On 25 October 2025, Bhuyar Joined Nationalist Congress Party (NCP) in Presence of Deputy Chief Minister of Maharashtra, Shri Ajit Pawar, NCP State President, Shri Sunil Tatkare. He got ticket offered from Morshi - Warud Assembly Constituency to contest against Girish Karale of NCP-SP. He lost in friendly fight against his ally and candidate of Bharatiya Janata Party (BJP) Umesh Alias "Chandu" Yawalkar.

== Controversies ==
In October 2024, during a public gathering in Amravati, Bhuyar, sparked outrage by saying that only girls who are "at the bottom of the lot" marry a boy from a farming family.He went on to classify women based on their appearance, stating that "second-grade" women tend to marry grocery store or paan kiosk while "third-grade" women marry farmers' sons. Bhuyar added that children from such marriages often inherit "weaker" characteristics. The MLA’s remarks sparked an outrage, with political leaders condemning them as derogatory and disrespectful towards women and the farming community.
