= Ramdas Tadas =

Indian politician

Ramdas Chandrabhanji Tadas

Member of Parliament, Lok Sabha
- In office (2014-2019), (2019 – 2024)
- Preceded by: Datta Meghe
- Succeeded by: Amar Kale
- Constituency: Wardha

Member of Maharashtra Legislative Council
- In office (1994-2000), (2000 – 2006)
- Preceded by: Vasantrao Wankhede
- Succeeded by: Zainuddin Mohsinbhai Zaveri
- Constituency: Wardha-Chandrapur-Gadhchiroli Local Authorities

Vice President of Bharatiya Janata Party, Maharashtra
- Incumbent
- Assumed office 24 Feb 2026
- President: Ravindra Chavan

Personal details
- Born: 1 April 1953 (age 73) Deoli, Maharashtra, India
- Party: Bhartiya Janata Party (2009-Present)
- Other political affiliations: Nationalist Congress Party (Before 2009)
- Spouse: Shobha (m. 1977)
- Children: 1 son, 4 daughters
- Parents: Chandrabhanji Tadas (father); Kaushalya Tadas (mother)
- Profession: Agriculturist, Politician

Ramdas Chandrabhanji Tadas (born 1 April 1953) is a senior politician and former Member of Parliament representing Wardha and he is a member of the Bharatiya Janata Party. He was Vice President of Bharatiya Janata Party, Maharashtra.

He was member of Maharashtra Legislative Council as member of Nationalist Congress Party. Later he moved to BJP in 2009 and contested Deoli Assembly seat of Maharashtra and loss by Ranjit Kamble. He contested 2014 Lok sabha elections from Wardha (Lok Sabha constituency) as BJP /NDA candidate.

== Positions held ==
- 1985-1987, 1990-1995,1996-1998 : Chairperson, Deoli Municipal Council
- 2007-2009 : Director, State Transport Corporation, Maharashtra
- May, 2014 : Elected to 16th Lok Sabha
- 1 Sep. 2014 onwards : Member, Standing Committee on Information Technology

== Sports & Clubs ==
Club - Maharashtra Kushtigir Parishad Vice President- Maharashtra State Wrestling Council Working President - Vidarbha Wrestling Association
