= Sharadrao Kale =

Indian politician

Member of Legislative Assembly of Maharashtra
- In office 1985–2004
- Preceded by: Shivchand Gowardhandas Chudiwala
- Succeeded by: Amar Sharadrao Kale
- Constituency: Arvi

Personal details
- Party: Indian National Congress (1990-2004)
- Other political affiliations: Indian Congress (Socialist) (till 1990)
- Children: Amar Sharadrao Kale

Sharadrao Kale, also known as Kale Sharad, is an Indian politician from Maharashtra. He was a four-time Member of Legislative Assembly from Arvi, from 1985 to 2004.

== Political career ==
Kale won for the first time in 1985 from the Arvi seat as an Indian Congress (Socialist) candidate defeating Shridharrao Shankarrao Thakare of Indian National Congress, succeeding Chudiwala Shivchand Gowardhandas of Indian National Congress (Indira).

In 1990, Kale joined Indian National Congress, and went on to defeat Khonde Jyoti Vijayrao of Janata Dal by a margin of 8,606 votes. He continued the feat in 1995 and 1999, defeating Independent candidate Kale Dilip Narayanrao and Bharatiya Janata Party's Vijayraoji Mude respectively.

In 2004, the legacy was carried forward by his son Amar Sharadrao Kale
