= Suresh Ganapat Wagmare =

Indian politician

Wagmare Suresh Ganapat

Member of Parliament in Lok Sabha
- In office (2004–2009)
- Preceded by: Prabhatai Rau
- Succeeded by: Datta Meghe
- Constituency: Wardha

Personal details
- Born: 15 September 1961 (age 64) Wardha, Maharashtra
- Party: Bharatiya Janata Party
- Spouse: Vanita Waghmare
- Children: 2 sons
- As of 16 September, 2006

Wagmare Suresh Ganapat (born 15 September 1961) is a member of the 14th Lok Sabha of India. He represents the Wardha constituency of Maharashtra and is a member of the Bharatiya Janata Party (BJP) political party.
