= Maharashtra Sahitya Parishad =

Language academy in Maharashtra state, India

Maharashtra Sahitya Parishad महाराष्ट्र साहित्य परिषद
- Established: 27 May 1906
- Mission: Furtherance of Marathi literature
- Focus: Marathi Language
- President: Dr. Raosaheb Kasabe
- Chair: Prof. Milind Joshi
- Head: Prakash Paigude
- Key people: Prakash Paigude
- Address: Tilak Road, Near Durvankur Dinning Hall, Sadashiv Peth, Pune-411030
- Location: Sadashiv Peth,, Pune, Maharashtra, India
- Website: https://sahityaparishad.org

Maharashtra Sahitya Parishad is a literary institution situated in the Indian state of Maharashtra for the purpose of the "furtherance of Marathi language and literature". It was established in Pune in 1906. The Encyclopedia of Indian Literature considers it as Marathi's first representative literary body. The Parishad arranges annual conferences runs Maharashtra Sahitya Patrika a Marathi quarterly, provides a reference library, conducts qualifying examinations in Marathi language and literature and classes for non-Marathi speakers in Pune. It has undertaken the publishing a History of Marathi literature. It has constituted various awards in the field of literature. The Parishad according to Deshpande lead in the demand for the formation of a separate linguistic state – Maharashtra.
