= Suresh Deshmukh =

Indian politician

Member of Maharashtra Legislative Assembly
- In office 2009–2014
- Succeeded by: Pankaj Rajesh Bhoyar
- Constituency: Wardha

Personal details
- Party: Indian Nationalist Congress (till 2009)
- Parent: Bapuraoji Deshmukh (father)

Suresh Bapuraoji Deshmukh is an Indian politician and former member of the Indian National Congress, and the son of Bapurao Deshmukh. He was a Member of the Maharashtra Legislative Assembly from the Wardha constituency.

Deshmukh contested an Assembly election in 2009 from Wardha as an independent candidate and won by a large margin.
