= Akhil Bharatiya Marathi Sahitya Mahamandal =

Marathi literary organisation

Akhil Bharatiya Marathi Sahitya Mahamandal (transl. All India Marathi Literary Federation) abbreviated as ABMSM is a name of Marathi literary organisation in Pune that represents the Marathi language, literature, and culture. It was established in 1961 to represent its founding members Maharashtra Sahitya Parishad, Mumbai Marathi Sahitya Sangh, Marathwada Sahitya Parishad, and Vidarbha Sahitya Sangh.

The founding organizations are considered permanent members of the Federation. Organizations registered in states other than Maharashtra and those abroad, working for their respective regions, can also be included. Currently, affiliated organizations include Marathi Sahitya Parishad (Hyderabad), Marathi Sahitya Sevak Mandal (Goa), Karnataka State Marathi Sahitya Parishad (Kalaburagi), Marathi Sahitya Parishad (Telangana), Chhattisgarh Marathi Sahitya Parishad (Bilaspur), and Madhya Pradesh Marathi Sahitya Sangh (Bhopal). Non-representative organizations at the state level can be recognized as associated institutions, such as Marathi Vangmay Parishad (Vadodara). The Mahamandal includes three representatives from each founding institution, one from each affiliated institution, and up to three from all associated institutions.

== History ==
Political movements aimed at unifying Marathi-speaking regions led to the formation of a representative organization for Marathi literature. In 1951, a meeting of literary representatives was held in Miraj under the leadership of poet Atmaram Ravaji Deshpande, who played a significant role in drafting the constitution of the new organization, named the Marathi Sahitya Mahamandal.

The Mahamandal, with branches in Maharashtra, Goa, Chhattisgarh, and Madhya Pradesh, as well as in Bidar and Belgaum, has over 12,000 members and is the largest literary organization in Marathi literature. It promotes Marathi literature and culture through public participation, conferences, and various activities.

== Literary conferences ==
Prior to its establishment, literary conferences were organized by the Maharashtra Sahitya Parishad. Earlier, these conferences were known as 'Maharashtra Sahitya Sammelan.' After the Sahitya Mahamandal began its activities, it was decided to hold an annual Sahitya Sammelan. The 45th Sahitya Sammelan took place in Madgaon in 1964, and the 46th Sahitya Sammelan, held in Hyderabad in 1965, marked the first Akhil Bharatiya Marathi Sahitya Sammelan (All India Marathi Literary Summit) organized by the Sahitya Mahamandal.

== Affiliated Institutions ==
- Mumbai Marathi Sahitya Sangh – Covers Mumbai City and Suburbs
- Maharashtra Sahitya Parishad (Pune) – Covers Konkan, Western Maharashtra, and Khandesh
- Marathwada Sahitya Parishad (Aurangabad) – Covers Marathwada
- Vidarbha Sahitya Sangh (Nagpur) – Covers Vidarbha

=== Other Institutions ===
- Kokan Marathi Sahitya Parishad (Ratnagiri, Sindhudurg, Raigad, Navi Mumbai, Thane, and Mumbai)
- Dakshin Maharashtra Sahitya Sabha, Kolhapur

== Financial assistance ==
- Annual subsidy of Rs.5 lakhs is received from Government of Maharashtra. It was increased to 10 lakhs in 2017.
