= Anil Bonde =

Indian politician

Dr. Anil Sukhdeorao Bonde

Member of Parliament, Rajya Sabha
- Incumbent
- Assumed office 5 July 2022
- Preceded by: Vikas Mahatme
- Constituency: Maharashtra

Minister of Agriculture Government of Maharashtra
- In office 16 June 2019 – 12 November 2019
- Chief Minister: Devendra Fadnavis
- Preceded by: Chandrakant Patil
- Succeeded by: Subhash Desai

Member of Maharashtra Legislative Assembly
- In office 2009–2019
- Preceded by: Harshvardhan Deshmukh
- Succeeded by: Devendra Bhuyar
- Constituency: Morshi

Personal details
- Born: 3 August 1960 (age 65) Warud, Amravati district, Maharashtra
- Party: Bharatiya Janata Party
- Spouse: Vasudha Bonde (m. 1986)
- Children: 1 son, 1 daughter
- Parents: Sukhdevrao Bonde (father); Triveni Bonde (mother)
- Education: M.B.B.S., M.D.
- Alma mater: Government Medical College and Hospital, Nagpur
- Profession: Doctor, Politician

Dr. Anil Sukhdevrao Bonde is an Indian politician who is serving as a member of the Rajya Sabha from 5 July 2022. He had served as a member of the Maharashtra Legislative Assembly from Morshi Assembly constituency from 2009 to 2014, as an independent candidate and 2014 to 2019 as the candidate of Bharatiya Janata Party. Bonde's victory was with the largest margin in his Amravati district.

Bonde was the sitting MLA, he was an independent MLA in 2009 to 2014.
