= Chandu Atmaramji Yawalkar =

Indian politician

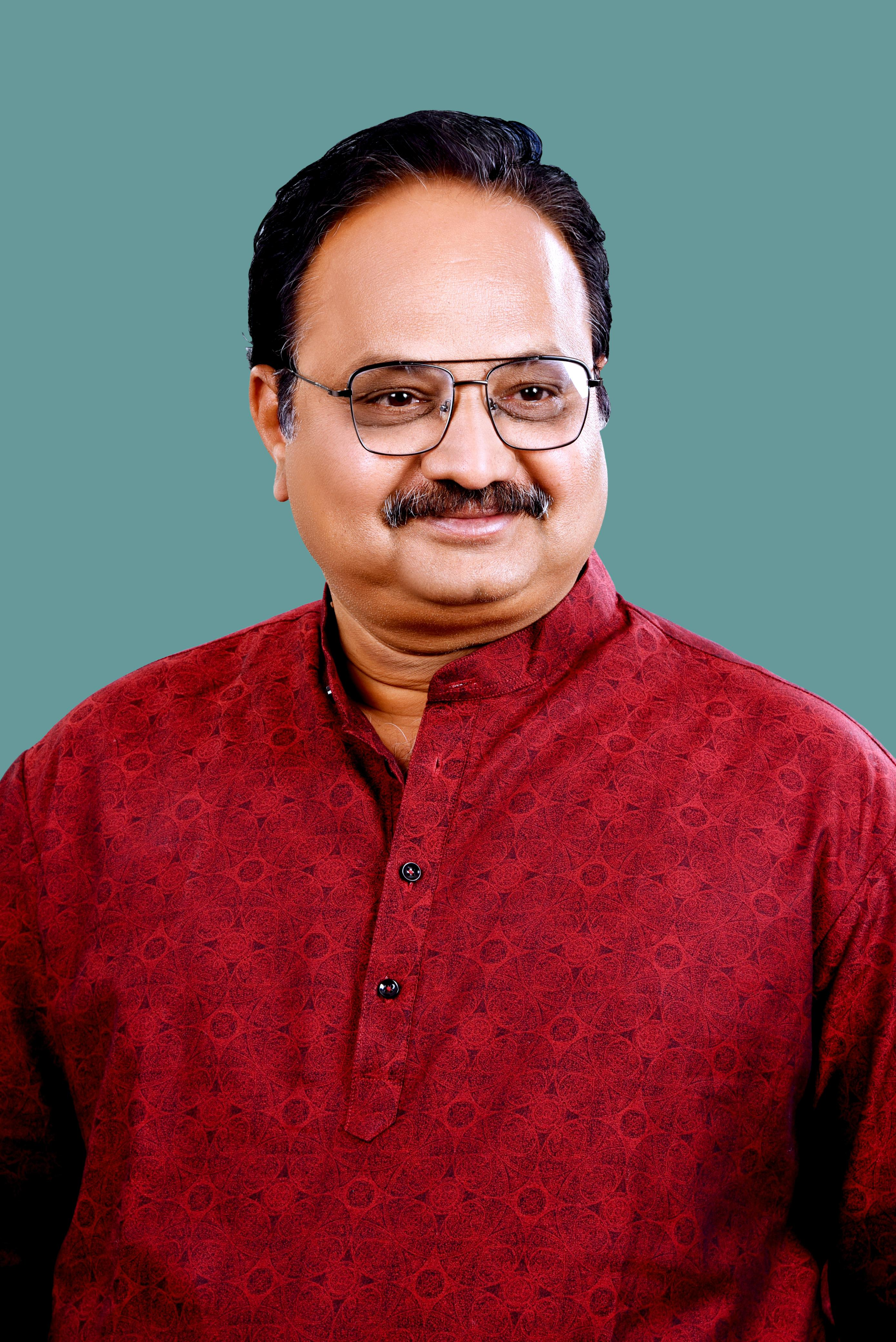

Member of the Maharashtra Legislative Assembly
- Incumbent
- Assumed office 24 November 2024
- Preceded by: Devendra Mahadevrao Bhuyar
- Constituency: Morshi-Warud Assembly Constituency

Personal details
- Political party: Bharatiya Janata Party (BJP)
- Profession: Politician

Umesh "Chandu" Atmaramji Yawalkar is an Indian politician from Maharashtra. He is a Member of the Maharashtra Legislative Assembly, 2024, representing Morshi-Warud Assembly Constituency as a member of the Bharatiya Janata Party.

== See also ==
- List of chief ministers of Maharashtra
- Maharashtra Legislative Assembly
