= Ramchandra Ghangare =

Indian politician (born 1928)

Ramchandra Ghangare (born 16 June 1928) is an Indian retired politician who was member of the 10th Lok Sabha of India. He represented the Wardha constituency of Maharashtra and is a member of the Communist Party of India political party. Ghangare was born in Ghorad, Wardha. He was also a member of the legislative assembly from 1967 to 1972. In his political career he fought for the upliftment of poor people. As an ardent communist he sticks whole life to his principal. He contested many elections for Loksabha and vidhansabha with the popular support. He was motivational guru of famous social activist Sindhutai sapkal.
