= Datta Meghe =

Indian politician (1936–2026)

Dattaji Meghe

Member of Maharashtra Legislative Council
- In office (1978–1984), (1984–1990), (1990–1991), (2000 – 2002)
- Constituency: Elected by MLAs

Member of Parliament, Lok Sabha
- In office 1991–1996
- Preceded by: Banwarilal Purohit
- Succeeded by: Banwarilal Purohit
- Constituency: Nagpur, Maharashtra
- In office 1996–1998
- Preceded by: Tejsingharao Laxmanrao Bhosale
- Succeeded by: Rani Chitralekha Bhonsle
- Constituency: Ramtek, Maharashtra
- In office 1998–1999
- Preceded by: Vijay Mude
- Succeeded by: Prabha Rau
- Constituency: Wardha, Maharashtra
- In office 2009–2014
- Preceded by: Suresh Ganapat Wagmare
- Succeeded by: Ramdas Tadas
- Constituency: Wardha, Maharashtra

Member of Parliament, Rajya Sabha
- In office 3 April 2002 – 2 April 2008
- Constituency: Maharashtra

Leader of Opposition Maharashtra Legislative Council
- In office 7 September 1982 – 16 November 1984
- Chief Minister: Babasaheb Bhosale; Vasantdada Patil
- Preceded by: G P Pradhan
- Succeeded by: Devidas Karale

Personal details
- Born: Dattatraya Raghobaji Meghe; 11 November 1936 Pavnar, Wardha district, Central Provinces and Berar, British India
- Died: 22 March 2026 (aged 89) Nagpur, Maharashtra, India
- Party: Bharatiya Janata Party (2014–2026)
- Other political affiliations: Indian National Congress (2009–2014), (before 2000); Nationalist Congress Party (2000–2008)
- Spouse: Shalinitai Meghe (m. 1962)
- Children: Mla Sameer Meghe, Ex-Mlc Sagar Meghe, Arjun Meghe
- Education: B.A. 1963 Nagpur University

Dattatraya Raghobaji Meghe (11 November 1936 – 22 March 2026) was an Indian politician and a leader of Bharatiya Janata Party and before he was senior Member of the Indian National Congress. He was elected to Lok Sabha as a member of the Congress Party four times in Maharashtra state.

Meghe was a member of the Rajya Sabha, the upper house of the Indian Parliament, representing Maharashtra, from April 2002 to 2008.

He was a member of the Legislative Council of Maharashtra from April 1978 to June 1991 three times and also during 2001–April 2002.

== The Meghe Group ==
Apart from politics, Meghe was associated with the Meghe Group, which operates educational and healthcare institutions in Maharashtra. The group operates the School of Scholars network of CBSE schools and the Datta Meghe Institute of Higher Education and Research, as well as medical and engineering colleges, hospitals and other businesses.

He also was the President of Yeshwantrao Chavan College of Engineering (YCCE), situated in Wanadongri, Hingna SubDivision, Nagpur.

== Death ==
Meghe died on 22 March 2026, at the age of 89.
