= Pratap Adsad =

Indian politician

Pratap Arunbhau Adsad

Member of the Maharashtra Legislative Assembly
- Incumbent
- Assumed office Since 24 October 2019
- Preceded by: Virendra Jagtap
- Constituency: Dhamangaon Railway

President Nagar parishad Dhamangaon Railway
- In office 28 December 2016 – 28 December 2019

Personal details
- Born: 6 January 1978 (age 48) Amravati, Maharashtra, India
- Party: Bharatiya Janata Party
- Parent: Arun Adsad (father)
- Occupation: Entrepreneur

Pratap Adsad is an Indian politician. In 2019 he was elected to the Maharashtra Legislative Assembly as Bharatiya Janata Party member for Dhamangaon Railway Assembly constituency.

== Political career ==
Pratap Adsad is a member of the Rashtriya Swayamsevak Sangh (RSS), since his childhood a far-right Hindu nationalist paramilitary volunteer organisation.

He joined Bharatiya Janata Yuva Morcha. He is the youngest elected president - Dhamangaon Railway Nagar Parishad.

=== Positions held ===
==== Within BJP ====
- Vice President, BJYM Maharashtra State Unit
- Secretary, BJYM Maharashtra State Unit

==== Legislative ====
- Member, Maharashtra Legislative Assembly - Since 2019
