= Samir Trimbakrao Kunawar =

Indian politician

Member of the Maharashtra Legislative Assembly
- Incumbent
- Assumed office 2014
- Preceded by: Ashok Shinde
- Constituency: Hinganghat

Personal details
- Political party: Bharatiya Janata Party

Samir Trimbakrao Kunwar is the current Member of Legislative Assembly from the Hinganghat of Maharashtra state of India. He was with the Rashtriya Swayamsevak Sangh, involved in Gau Rakshak groups and is 10th pass.

In the Maharashtra Assembly elections of 2019, Samir Trimbakrao Kunawar from the side of Bhartiya Janata Party won the election with 53.83% of the total votes of the constituency. He also won in Maharashtra assembly election, 2014 on Hinganghat seat from the Bhartiya Janata Party by defeating the Bahujan Samajvadi Party's candidate by a margin of 65175 votes which was 34.67% of the total votes polled in the constituency. Bhartiya Janata Party had a vote share of 48.02% in 2014 in the seat.

== Personal information ==
Samir Trimbakrao Kunawar's father's name is Traymbakrao Devidaspant Kunawar. His wife's name is Shraddha Kunawar (Uplenchwar). He has 2 sons, Soham and Omkar. His education is done till higher secondary classes, he is 12th pass. S. T. Kunwar's net worth is nearly 10.7 crore Indian Rupees. Samir Trimbakrao is other than a politician, a farmer and a businessman.

== Political career ==
Samir Kunawar is a member of the Rashtriya Swayamsevak Sangh (RSS), a far-right Hindu nationalist paramilitary volunteer organisation.
