= Dattapur Dhamangaon =

Dhamangaon Railway Dattapur Dhamangaon
- Municipal Council And City
- Nickname: Dattapur Dhamangaon (Railway)
- Location in Maharashtra, India
- Coordinates: 20.7847°N 78.1384°E
- Country: India
- State: Maharashtra
- District: Amravati
- Founder: footprints are founded in late 15th century. It is one of the tribs where Nijam Of Hydrabad used to rest while travelling to Umbravati Sultanate, now known as Amravati. The original foundation of City started in 1890 to 1940 when many of the people from village area located near city line used to migrate at dhamangaon
- Named for: Home of pilgrimage

Government
  - Type: Municipal Council Class 'B'
  - Body: Municipal Council of Dhamangaon Railway

Area
  - Total: 18 km^{2} (6.9 sq mi)
- Elevation: 297 m (974 ft)

Population (2026)
  - Total: 45,592
  - Rank: In Amravati 6
  - Density: 2,500/km^{2} (6,600/sq mi)
- Demonym: Dhamangaonkars

Languages
  - Official: Marathi
- Time zone: UTC+5:30 (IST)
- PIN: 444709
- Telephone code: 07222
- Vehicle registration: MH-27
- Sex ratio: 51:49 ♂/♀

Dhamangaon is a City and a municipal council in Amravati district in the state of Maharashtra, India. Dhamangaon is one of the three talukas (Other two are Chandur Railway and Nandgaon Khandeshwar) in Chandur (Railway) subdivision in Amravati district. The municipal council is named as Dattapur-Dhamangaon Municipal council.

== Demographics ==
As of 2025, Dhamangaon had a population of 45,592. Males constitute 51% of the population and females 49%. Dhamangaon has an average literacy rate of 85%, higher than the national average of 59.5%: male literacy is 83% and, female literacy is 88%. In Dhamangaon, 12% of the population is under 6 years of age.

== Climate ==
Dhamangaon has a tropical climate with hot, dry summers and mild to cool winters. Summer lasts from March to June, monsoon season from July to October and winter from November to March. The warmest month is May. About 979 mm of precipitation falls annually.

== Governance ==
Dattapur-Dhamangaon is a Municipal Council is the local authority in the city. The Dattapur-Dhamangaon city is divided into 17 wards for which elections are held every 5 years.

Member of Legislative Assembly (MLA):

The Dhamangaon Railway Assembly constituency is one of the 288 Vidhan Sabha constituencies in Maharashtra, situated in Amravati district. In the 2024 Maharashtra Assembly elections, Pratap Adsad of the Bharatiya Janata Party (BJP) was re-elected as the MLA, securing 110,641 votes, which accounted for 49.54% of the total votes. His closest competitor, Virendra Walmikrao Jagtap of the Indian National Congress (INC), received 94,413 votes, representing 42.27% of the votes.

Member of Parliament (MP):

Dhamangaon Railway falls under the Wardha Lok Sabha constituency. In the 2024 general elections, Amar Sharadrao Kale of the Nationalist Congress Party (Sharad Pawar faction) [NCP(SP)] was elected as the Member of Parliament. Prior to this, Kale served as a member of the Maharashtra Legislative Assembly, representing the Arvi constituency from 2004 to 2009 and again from 2014 to 2019.

== Professions ==
Out of total population, 45,592 were engaged in work or business activity. Of this 35,430 were males while 10,102 were females. Of total 25000 working population, 89.27% were engaged in Main Work while 10.73% of total workers were engaged in Marginal Work. This region mostly depends on the cotton & agricultural business.

== Transport ==
Dhamangaon is well connected by road and trains to other important cities. Dhamangaon railway station is a railway station serving Dhamangaon town, in Amravati district of Maharashtra State of India. It is under Nagpur railway division of Central Railway Zone of Indian Railways. It is located on Howrah–Nagpur–Mumbai line of the Indian Railways. As of 2016, electrified double Broad Gauge railway line exist and at this station, 40 trains stop. Dr. Babasaheb Ambedkar International Airport (Nagpur), is at distance of 105 kilometers

Dhamangaon is also connected by The "Samruddhi Mahamarg," officially named the Hindu Hrudaysamrat Balasaheb Thackeray Maharashtra Samruddhi Mahamarg, is a 701-kilometer, 6-lane (expandable to 8) access-controlled expressway connecting Mumbai and Nagpur in Maharashtra, India, also known as the Mumbai-Nagpur Expressway

Dhamangaon Railway Station (station code: DMN) is a significant station located in Amravati district, Maharashtra, India. It falls under the Nagpur Division of the Central Railway zone of Indian Railways. The station serves as a halt for numerous trains, facilitating connectivity to various major cities across India.

As of the latest available information, approximately 38 trains halt at Dhamangaon Railway Station. These trains connect Dhamangaon to several key cities, including:

Nagpur: Regular services link Dhamangaon to Nagpur, enhancing regional connectivity.

Pune: Trains such as the NGP PUNE SF EXP (12136) provide direct routes to Pune.

Mumbai: Services like the VIDARBHA EXPRESS (12105) connect passengers to Mumbai.

Howrah (Kolkata): The HWH CSMT MAIL (12810) offers connectivity to Howrah.

Chennai: The NAVAJIVAN SF EXP (12656) facilitates travel to Chennai.

Ahmedabad: Trains such as the ADI HWH EXP (12833) connect to Ahmedabad.

Jaipur: BGKT SF Express (20625) connect to Jaipur.

Shalimar (Kolkata): The SHM LTT EXPRESS (18030) provides a route to Shalimar.

Amravati: Local trains ensure frequent connectivity to Amravati.

These connections make Dhamangaon Railway Station a pivotal hub, linking passengers to various parts of the country.
