= Sumit Wankhede =

Indian politician

Member of the Maharashtra Legislative Assembly
- Incumbent
- Assumed office 2024
- Preceded by: Dadarao Keche
- Constituency: Arvi

Personal details
- Born: Sumit Kishor Wankhede
- Party: Bharatiya Janata Party
- Spouse: Adv Kshitija Wadatkar Wankhede
- Children: Sarth Sumit Wankhede
- Profession: Politician

Sumit Kishor Wankhede is an Indian politician from Maharashtra. He is a member of the Maharashtra Legislative Assembly from Arvi constituency in Wardha district. He won the 2024 Maharashtra Legislative Assembly election representing the Bharatiya Janata Party.

== Early life, education and family ==
Wankhede is from Arvi, Wardha district, Maharashtra. He is the son of Kishor Wankhede, an advocate. He completed his graduation in engineering at the MIT World Peace University, Pune. He also has post-graduate study in governance. He married his childhood friend and lawyer Kshitija G. Wadatkar in 2015. They have a son.

== Career ==
A gold medalist in governance, Sumit worked as a personal assistant for 16 years to Maharashtra's Chief Minister Devendra Fadnavis. He made his electoral debut in the 2024 election, winning from the Arvi Assembly constituency, representing the Bharatiya Janata Party in the 2024 Maharashtra Legislative Assembly election. He polled 101,397 votes and defeated his nearest rival, Mayura Amar Kale of the Nationalist Congress Party (SP), by a margin of 39,574 votes. He was in charge of BJP's Lok Sabha elections in Wardha district.
