= Arvi, Wardha =

Arvi
- city
- Location in Maharashtra, India
- Coordinates: 20.59°N 79.14°E
- Country: India
- State: Maharashtra
- Region: Vidarbha
- District: Wardha

Government
  - Type: Municipal Council
  - Body: Arvi Municipal Council Est.1865

Area
  - city: 6.78 km^{2} (2.62 sq mi)
- Elevation: 828 m (2,717 ft)

Population (2011)
  - Urban: 42,822
  - Metro: 145,981
- Demonym: Arvikar

Languages
  - Official: Marathi
- Time zone: UTC+5:30 (IST)
- Pin code: 442201
- Telephone code: +91-7157
- Vehicle registration: MH32

Arvi is a city and municipal council in Wardha district in the state of Maharashtra, India.

== Geography ==
Arvi is located at 20.59°N 79.14°E. It has an average elevation of 328 meters (1075 feet). Arvi is an important center for the cotton and soybean trade. The closest airport from Arvi is Nagpur Airport situated at 100 kilometers and the closest Railway Station from Arvi is Pulgoan Junction situated at 35 kilometers, location of Arvi is on Ravandev Garmasur Plateau, which is also a reason for the growth of long thread bearing cotton. Wardha river and Bakli river flowing alongside the borders of Arvi taluka are the main source of water for the villages.

Arvi is also called the City of Saints. Saint Maybai, Saint Pandurang Maharaj, Saint Lahanuji Maharaj(Takarkheda) are the prominent ones having their own followers spread across the Vidarbha region.

== Demographics ==
As of 2011 India census, Arvi had a population of 42,822: 21,956 males (51%) and 20,864 females (49%). There are 5,836 members of Scheduled Castes and 2,123 of Scheduled Tribes.

Below data is for Taluka.

Year	Male	Female	Total Population	Change	Religion (%)							
Year	Male	Female	Total Population	Change	Hindu	Muslim	Christian	Sikhs	Buddhist	Jain	Other religions and persuasions	Religion not stated
2001	74088	69410	143498	-	82.725	5.621	0.046	0.047	10.890	0.414	0.220	0.037
2011	75179	70802	145981	1.730	82.579	6.087	0.086	0.072	10.471	0.334	0.217	0.153

== Languages ==
Residents of arvi communicate in Marathi language. Apart from the commonly used Varhadi, a dialect of Marathi language used in the district .Hindi and English are also spoken in the region.

== Politics ==
For Maharashtra Assembly - Many years Indian National congress (INC) ruled over here. Current MLA is Sumit Wankhede of BJP. Previous term was completed by Dadaraoji Keche
