= Wardha Assembly constituency =

Coordinates: 20.75°N 78.61°E

Wardha
- Constituency No. 47 for the Maharashtra Legislative Assembly

Constituency details
- Country: India
- Region: Western India
- State: Maharashtra
- District: Wardha
- Lok Sabha constituency: Wardha
- Established: 1952
- Total electors: 295,029
- Reservation: None

Member of Legislative Assembly
- 15th Maharashtra Legislative Assembly
- Incumbent Pankaj Rajesh Bhoyar
- Party: BJP
- Alliance: NDA
- Elected year: 2024

Wardha Assembly constituency is one of the 288 Vidhan Sabha (legislative assembly) constituencies in Maharashtra state in western India, and is a segment of Wardha Lok Sabha constituency. This constituency is one of the four Vidhan Sabha constituencies in Wardha district and comprises parts of the Wardha and Seloo tehsils of this district.

== Members of Legislative Assembly ==
Year	Member	Party
1952	Shantabai Narulkar	Indian National Congress
1957	Mahadeo Tukaram Thakre	Indian National Congress
1957	Shankarrao Vithalrao Sonavane (Sc)	Indian National Congress
1962	Bapuraoji Marotrao Deshmukh	Indian National Congress
1967	Ramchandra Marotrao Ghangare	Communist Party of India
1972	Vasantrao J. Karlekar	Indian National Congress
1978	Pramod Bhauraoji Shende	Indian National Congress (I)
1980	Pramod Bhauraoji Shende	Indian National Congress (I)
1985	Pramod Bhauraoji Shende	Indian National Congress
1990	Manik Mahadeo Sabane	Independent politician
1995	Pramod Bhauraoji Shende	Indian National Congress
1999	Pramod Bhauraoji Shende	Indian National Congress
2004	Pramod Bhauraoji Shende	Indian National Congress
2009	Suresh Bapuraoji Deshmukh	Independent politician
2014	Dr. Pankaj Rajesh Bhoyar	Bharatiya Janata Party
2019	Dr. Pankaj Rajesh Bhoyar	Bharatiya Janata Party
2024	Dr. Pankaj Rajesh Bhoyar	Bharatiya Janata Party

== Election results ==
=== Assembly Election 2024 ===
2024 Maharashtra Legislative Assembly election : Wardha
Party	Candidate	Votes	%	±%
BJP	Dr. Pankaj Rajesh Bhoyar	92,067	47.00%	▼0.85
INC	Shekhar Pramod Shende	84,597	43.19%	▲0.10
Independent	Pawade Sachin Sureshrao	8,728	4.46%	New
BSP	Vishal Sharad Ramteke	5,166	2.64%	▲0.08
Independent	Kotambkar Ravindra Narhari	1,556	0.79%	New
NOTA	None of the above	1,503	0.77%	▼0.87
Margin of victory		7,470	3.81%	▼0.95
Turnout		197,374	66.90%	▲13.35
Total valid votes		195,871		
Registered electors		295,029		▼6.83
BJP hold		Swing	▼0.85	

=== Assembly Election 2019 ===
2019 Maharashtra Legislative Assembly election : Wardha
Party	Candidate	Votes	%	±%
BJP	Dr. Pankaj Rajesh Bhoyar	79,739	47.85%	▲19.99
INC	Shekhar Pramod Shende	71,806	43.09%	▲20.42
VBA	Anant Shamraoji Umate	6,383	3.83%	New
BSP	Manish Devrao Pusate	4,273	2.56%	▼10.97
NOTA	None of the above	2,729	1.64%	▲1.07
Independent	Niraj Gulabrao Gujar	1,847	1.11%	New
Margin of victory		7,933	4.76%	▼0.43
Turnout		169,573	53.55%	▼5.13
Total valid votes		166,634		
Registered electors		316,641		▲11.85
BJP hold		Swing	▲19.99	

=== Assembly Election 2014 ===
2014 Maharashtra Legislative Assembly election : Wardha
Party	Candidate	Votes	%	±%
BJP	Dr. Pankaj Rajesh Bhoyar	45,897	27.86%	New
INC	Shekhar Pramod Shende	37,347	22.67%	▼4.81
BSP	Niraj Gulabrao Gujar	22,283	13.53%	▲6.71
SS	Balpande Ravikant Pandurang	18,867	11.45%	▼3.48
NCP	Suresh Bapuraoji Deshmukh	18,192	11.04%	New
Independent	Rannaware Virendra Baburao	13,388	8.13%	New
Independent	Shyam Shankarrao Gaikwad	1,554	0.94%	New
GGP	Bhimrao Tukaramji Ade	1,224	0.74%	New
NOTA	None of the above	945	0.57%	New
Margin of victory		8,550	5.19%	▼2.74
Turnout		166,115	58.68%	▼2.29
Total valid votes		164,724		
Registered electors		283,104		▲17.28
BJP gain from Independent		Swing	▼7.55	

=== Assembly Election 2009 ===
2009 Maharashtra Legislative Assembly election : Wardha
Party	Candidate	Votes	%	±%
Independent	Suresh Deshmukh	52,085	35.41%	New
INC	Shekhar Pramod Shende	40,420	27.48%	▼15.03
SS	Balpande Ravikant Pandurangji	21,966	14.93%	▲6.36
Independent	Shyam Shankarrao Gaikwad	12,127	8.25%	New
BSP	Shaikh Salim Shaikh Nabi	10,035	6.82%	▼5.41
MNS	Hedau Ajay Namdeorao	2,782	1.89%	New
SBP	Kashikar Vaibhav Ravi	2,672	1.82%	New
Independent	Pangul Rajabhau Bhauraoji	1,666	1.13%	New
Margin of victory		11,665	7.93%	
Turnout		147,173	60.97%	▼1.09
Total valid votes		147,081		
Registered electors		241,396		▲17.98
Independent gain from INC		Swing	▼7.10	

=== Assembly Election 2004 ===
2004 Maharashtra Legislative Assembly election : Wardha
Party	Candidate	Votes	%	±%
INC	Pramod Bhauraoji Shende	53,963	42.51%	▲3.92
Independent	Shyam Gaikwad	34,731	27.36%	New
BSP	Dr. Gode Shirish Santoshrao	15,519	12.23%	New
SS	Ravikant Panduranj Balpande	10,883	8.57%	▼7.27
Independent	Ithape Sunita Bhaskar	4,774	3.76%	New
Independent	Sui. Manda Babaro Kombe	1,018	0.80%	New
Independent	Rajendra Gulabrao Shembarkar	968	0.76%	New
Turnout		126,980	62.06%	▼0.11
Total valid votes		126,941		
Registered electors		204,605		▲3.26
INC hold		Swing	▲3.92	

=== Assembly Election 1999 ===
1999 Maharashtra Legislative Assembly election : Wardha
Party	Candidate	Votes	%	±%
INC	Pramod Bhauraoji Shende	45,188	38.59%	▲3.88
NCP	Deshmukh Suresh Bapuraoji	37,151	31.73%	New
SS	Gaikwad Shyam Shankarrao	18,544	15.84%	▲5.26
Independent	Jaiswal Suresh Motilalji	12,440	10.62%	New
Independent	Ithape Bhaskar Dadarao	1,983	1.69%	New
Margin of victory		8,037	6.86%	▼10.29
Turnout		123,180	62.17%	▼10.50
Total valid votes		117,085		
Registered electors		198,143		▲2.70
INC hold		Swing	▲3.88	

=== Assembly Election 1995 ===
1995 Maharashtra Legislative Assembly election : Wardha
Party	Candidate	Votes	%	±%
INC	Pramod Bhauraoji Shende	47,503	34.71%	▼2.17
Independent	Jaiswal Suresh Motilalji	24,036	17.56%	New
SS	Gaikwad Shyambhau Shankarrao	14,483	10.58%	New
CPI(M)	Zade Yeshwant Namdeorao	12,365	9.03%	▲0.94
JD	Prof. Ethape Bhaskar Dadarao	10,888	7.96%	New
Independent	Mathankar Kishor Alis Vasudev Yeshwant	9,094	6.64%	New
Independent	Aglawe Vijay Nagrao	5,015	3.66%	New
Independent	Chaware Charansingh Babulalji	4,164	3.04%	New
Margin of victory		23,467	17.15%	▲13.79
Turnout		140,202	72.67%	▲12.81
Total valid votes		136,866		
Registered electors		192,933		▲10.15
INC gain from Independent		Swing	▼5.53	

=== Assembly Election 1990 ===
1990 Maharashtra Legislative Assembly election : Wardha
Party	Candidate	Votes	%	±%
Independent	Manik Mahadeo Sabane	41,604	40.24%	New
INC	Shande Pramod Bhauraoji	38,126	36.88%	▼14.54
CPI(M)	Zade Yeshwant Namdeorao	8,369	8.09%	▼18.57
RPI	Kamble Ghanshyam Daulatrao	6,661	6.44%	New
BJP	Prashant Purushottamrao Ignle	3,441	3.33%	New
BSP	Thombre Ramchandra Shankar	2,901	2.81%	New
Doordarshi Party	Gurmule Ramdas Marotrao	793	0.77%	New
Margin of victory		3,478	3.36%	▼21.40
Turnout		104,859	59.86%	▲1.92
Total valid votes		103,385		
Registered electors		175,162		▲31.97
Independent gain from INC		Swing	▼11.18	

=== Assembly Election 1985 ===
1985 Maharashtra Legislative Assembly election : Wardha
Party	Candidate	Votes	%	±%
INC	Pramod Bhauraoji Shende	38,982	51.42%	New
CPI(M)	Ramchandra Ghangare Marot	20,212	26.66%	▼2.54
RPI(K)	Shekh Kalam Shekh Rashid	8,130	10.72%	New
IC(S)	Raut Pandurang Daulatrao	3,442	4.54%	New
Independent	Chidam Sumitra Narayanrao	1,498	1.98%	New
Independent	Bhalkonikar Datia Vithal	557	0.73%	New
Margin of victory		18,770	24.76%	▼8.57
Turnout		76,902	57.94%	▲7.48
Total valid votes		75,811		
Registered electors		132,733		▲11.48
INC gain from INC(I)		Swing	▼11.10	

=== Assembly Election 1980 ===
1980 Maharashtra Legislative Assembly election : Wardha
Party	Candidate	Votes	%	±%
INC(I)	Pramod Bhauraoji Shende	36,942	62.52%	▼1.91
CPI(M)	Ramchandra Ghangare Marot	17,251	29.20%	▲1.95
BJP	Sawal Ramkisan Durgadas	3,923	6.64%	New
Independent	Vairagade Sagar Rama	969	1.64%	New
Margin of victory		19,691	33.33%	▼3.85
Turnout		60,084	50.46%	▼25.85
Total valid votes		59,085		
Registered electors		119,062		▲9.42
INC(I) hold		Swing	▼1.91	

=== Assembly Election 1978 ===
1978 Maharashtra Legislative Assembly election : Wardha
Party	Candidate	Votes	%	±%
INC(I)	Pramod Bhauraoji Shende	52,266	64.43%	New
CPI(M)	Ramchandra Ghangare Marot	22,107	27.25%	New
INC	Karklekar Vasantrao Janardharao	5,268	6.49%	▼41.08
Independent	Rahate Suresh Zinguji	1,047	1.29%	New
Margin of victory		30,159	37.18%	▲35.69
Turnout		83,032	76.31%	▲10.02
Total valid votes		81,122		
Registered electors		108,811		▲18.18
INC(I) gain from INC		Swing	▲16.86	

=== Assembly Election 1972 ===
1972 Maharashtra Legislative Assembly election : Wardha
Party	Candidate	Votes	%	±%
INC	Vasantrao J. Karlekar	28,419	47.57%	▲12.03
Independent	R. C. Marotra Ghangare	27,531	46.09%	New
AIFB	Sharawani D. Padmakar	2,395	4.01%	New
Independent	Vijaysingh Ramsingh Jot	724	1.21%	New
Independent	Ramdas Sitaram Lambat	667	1.12%	New
Margin of victory		888	1.49%	▼2.90
Turnout		61,036	66.29%	▼5.62
Total valid votes		59,736		
Registered electors		92,073		▲10.05
INC gain from CPI(M)		Swing	▲7.64	

=== Assembly Election 1967 ===
1967 Maharashtra Legislative Assembly election : Wardha
Party	Candidate	Votes	%	±%
CPI(M)	Ramchandra Ghangare Marot	22,307	39.93%	New
INC	Bapuraoji Marotrao Deshmukh	19,853	35.54%	▼11.81
RPI	J. T. Chowdhuri	4,288	7.68%	New
ABJS	R. D. Sawal	3,973	7.11%	New
Independent	R. S. Lambat	3,006	5.38%	New
Independent	S. B. Jadhao	845	1.51%	New
Independent	R. R. Ramteke	836	1.50%	New
Margin of victory		2,454	4.39%	▼18.34
Turnout		60,162	71.91%	▲5.29
Total valid votes		55,866		
Registered electors		83,668		▲8.88
CPI(M) gain from INC		Swing	▼7.42	

=== Assembly Election 1962 ===
1962 Maharashtra Legislative Assembly election : Wardha
Party	Candidate	Votes	%	±%
INC	Bapuraoji Marotrao Deshmukh	22,275	47.35%	▼12.45
CPI	Ramchandra Marotrao Ghangare	11,579	24.61%	New
Independent	Shamrao Govind Charde	8,231	17.50%	New
ABJS	Vithal Tukaram Meshram	3,671	7.80%	New
Independent	Raghoba Ramaji Ramteke	1,291	2.74%	New
Margin of victory		10,696	22.73%	▲12.05
Turnout		51,191	66.62%	▼60.85
Total valid votes		47,047		
Registered electors		76,841		▼43.67
INC hold		Swing	▲16.57	

=== Assembly Election 1957 ===
1957 Bombay State Legislative Assembly election : Wardha
Party	Candidate	Votes	%	±%
INC	Thakre Mahadeo Tukaram	53,529	30.78%	▼34.83
INC	Sonavane Shankarrao Vithalrao	50,446	29.01%	▼36.60
PWPI	Ghorpade Wamanrao Narsingrao	34,965	20.11%	New
SCF	Bhoyar Vinod Sakharam	34,941	20.09%	New
Margin of victory		18,564	10.68%	▼39.99
Turnout		173,881	127.47%	▲69.55
Total valid votes		173,881		
Registered electors		136,408		▲193.96
INC hold		Swing	▼34.83	

=== Assembly Election 1952 ===
1952 Hyderabad State Legislative Assembly election : Wardha
Party	Candidate	Votes	%	±%
INC	Shantabai Narulkar	17,635	65.61%	New
Socialist	Laxmansing Bindaprasad Yadeo	4,016	14.94%	New
ABJS	Manoharpant Balkrishna Deshpande	2,534	9.43%	New
KMPP	Satyanarain Sakhhnanad Bajaj	1,771	6.59%	New
Independent	Seshrao Bajirao Jadhao	794	2.95%	New
Margin of victory		13,619	50.67%	
Turnout		26,877	57.92%	
Total valid votes		26,877		
Registered electors		46,403		
INC win (new seat)				

== See also ==
- Wardha
- Seloo
- List of constituencies of Maharashtra Vidhan Sabha
