= State Highway 255 (Maharashtra) =

Road in Maharashtra, India

State Highway 255

Route information
- Maintained by MSRDC
- Length: 65 km (40 mi)

Major junctions
- North East end: Mauda, Nagpur
- South West end: Nagpur, Nagpur

Location
- Country: India
- State: Maharashtra
- Districts: Nagpur, Wardha
- Primary destinations: Seloo, Wardha

Highway system
- Roads in India; Expressways; National; State; Asian; State Highways in Maharashtra

Maharashtra State Highway 255 (MH SH 255) is a normal state highway in Nagpur and Wardha Districts, in the Indian state of Maharashtra. This state highway connects the cities of Nagpur, Hingna, Kanolibara, and Hingni, and intersects MSH-3 at Seloo. The inner ring road and outer ring road also cross this highway.

== Summary ==
Maharashtra State Highway 255 is one of the most important roads in Nagpur District, and provides an optional route for Wardha. The Hingna MIDC and Bor Wildlife Sanctuary are both located along this highway.

== Major junctions ==
This highway begins at its intersection at Jansi Rani Square in Nagpur city with National Highway 7, and ends at Seloo town connecting with MSH-3 or NH 204. MH SH 265 also intersects this highway at Mohgoan village near Zilpi Lake, and MH SH 250 intersects it near Dabha village. Maharashtra State Highway 275 Maharashtra State Highway 354 Arjuni Morgaon Bus Station Gondia-Nagbhir-Balharshah Branch Line

== Connections ==
Many villages, cities and towns in Nagpur District are connected to this state highway, including:

- Hingna
- Kanolibara
- Hingni
- Seloo

Other important landmarks on this highway include:

- Ambazari Lake
- Hingna MIDC
- Abhijeet Thermal Power Station
- Lata Mangeshkar Hospital, Wanadongri
- Raisoni College, MIDC Hingna
- Yashwantroa Chavan College of Engineering
- Kavi Kulguru Kalidas Sanskrit University, Ramtek
- Zilpi Lake
- Bor National Park

== See also ==
- List of state highways in Maharashtra
