= Hingni =

Village in Maharashtra

- Census Town
- Location in Maharashtra, India
- Coordinates: 21.356060°N 79.619118°E
- Country: India
- State: Maharashtra
- Region: Vidharba
- District: Wardha

Government
  - Type: Gram Panchayat
  - Body: Hingni Grampanchayat

Languages
  - Official: Marathi
- Time zone: UTC+5:30 (IST)
- PIN: 442104
- Telephone code: +917155
- Vehicle registration: MH-32

Hingni or Hingani is a village in Seloo Tehsil of Wardha district, Maharashtra, India. The village is situated on Seloo Bordharan Road, 25 km away from Wardha (9 km from Seloo - Nagpur Tuljapur Highway NH-7). Population in the village is about 25000. There is a Bor River passing through the west side of village . The entire village is surrounded by "Bor National Centurion Park. The Bor National Centurion Park and "Bor Dam" is just 5 km away from this village.

Theres are basically three main castes are in this village. Halba-Koshti, Teli and Kunbi. Nimje, Khadgi, Dekate Mude are major surname holders in this village. This village is commonly known as Hingani-Subhedarchi (i.e. Subhedar's Hingani)

There is the "Bazar Chowk" in the centre of village. Highschool is up to 10th class. There are three major temples, Durga Mata Mandir, Murlidhar Mandir and Ganesh Mandir in the village. The principal occupation in Hingani is agriculture. Cotton is main crop in this village. In earlier days this village was famous for Banana trees.
