= Santoshrao Gode =

Indian politician (1925–2000)

Santoshrao Vyankatrao Gode (29 August 1925 – 6 February 2000) was an Indian politician and a leader of the Indian National Congress party.

== Early life ==
Gode was born to Shri Vyankatrao & Manoramabai Gode at Kharangna Gode, Wardha District on 29 August 1925. He completed his graduation in Bachelor of Arts from Morris College, Nagpur University. He was married to Smt. Sindhutai Gode on 19 May 1952. They have three sons who are presently settled in Nagpur & Wardha.

== Career ==
He was a Member of the Parliament of India having been elected to the 6th Lok Sabha from Wardha Lok Sabha constituency in Maharashtra in 1977.

An avid agriculturist, he was also a member of several development committees and institutions

Gode held the following positions before being elected as the Member Of Parliament from Wardha:

- Agriculture Produce Market Committee, Wardha, 1955–1962,
- Maharashtra State Road Transport Corporation, 1976–1977,
- District Development Board, Wardha, 1957–1962,
- Director, Maharashtra State Cooperative Land Development Bank Ltd., 1973–1977,
- Maharashtra State Irrigation Committee, Bombay, Founder-Member
- Founder-Member – Mahatma Gandhi Institute of Medical Sciences
- Founder-Member – Yeshwant Education Society, Wardha (Sevagram)
- Member Janapada Sabha, Wardha, 1953–1962;
- President, Zila Parishad, Wardha, 1962–1972;
- President, District Congress Committee, Wardha;
- Member, Maharashtra Congress Committee;
- Member, Committee on Subordinate Legislation.

== Death ==
Gode died in Bordharan on 6 February 2000, at the age of 74.
