= Bordharan =

Dam in India

Bordharan is a dam in Seloo Tahsil, Wardha District. Formed by the Bor Dam (a key feature of the Bor River project), – and an area of wide spectrum of wildlife, including sambhar, cheetal, barking deer, nilgai, tigers, leopards, and wild dogs. This place has a water reservoir surrounded by hills and beautiful landscape.

== Bordharan Wildlife Sanctuary ==
Bor Wildlife Sanctuary is a wildlife sanctuary located Hingi Wardha District in the Indian state of Maharashtra. It is home to a wide variety of wild animals. The sanctuary covers an area of 121.1 km² (46.8 miles square). which includes the drainage basin Bor Dam.

Notably, Bor Sanctuary and some adjacent protected areas will merge with Pench Tiger Reserve (Maharashtra) as "core-satellite," more than twice the area of the tiger reserve that was well established. Bor Dam Bor Dharan Near Shelu Wildlife and Picnic Spot Bor Wildlife Animal Sanctuary (Bor Dam)Bor Dam Bor Dharan Near Shelu Wildlife and Picnic Spot Bor Wildlife Animal Sanctuary (Bor Dam)

Bor Sanctuary is located between several other Bengal tiger habitats, including Pench Tiger Reserve Maharashtra), 90 km² (35 square miles) to the northeast; Nagzira Wildlife Sanctuary, 125 km² (48 square miles) northeast east; Umred Karhangla Sanctuary Wildlife (Pro), 75 km² (29 square miles) in south-east, Tadoba - Andhari Tiger Reserve, 85 km² (33 square miles) in the southeast, Melghat Tiger Reserve, 140 km² (54 square miles) in the northwest and west Satpura National Park and Tiger Reserve, 160 km²

== Areas ==
In April 2012, the state government of Maharashtra issued a notification adding 60 km² (23 square miles) to the old 61.1 km² (23.6 square miles) of the Bor Sanctuary. The new core area of 115.92 km² (44.76 sq mi) is the most protected and inviolable sanctuary in which the public is not allowed. It consists of 95.7% of the total area. Most of the core area is contiguous with good forest management Forestry Division Wardha and Nagpur. See Map of the Bor Wildlife Sanctuary.

Eco-tourism area of 5.21 km² (2.01 square miles) designated for public access to nature and wildlife tourism comprises 4.3% of the total area of the sanctuary. The purpose of the tourist is to educate the public about the importance of nature and wildlife conservation and to promote environmental awareness. The buffer zone is the least protected forest area near the Sanctuary, which serves as a protective barrier for the core area.

Bor Sanctuary is divided physically by the reservoir of Bor into 2 sections, above, two thirds (40 km² (15 sq mi)) as the West and third, (21 km² (8.1 sq mi)) because the eastern part. 95% of the western part is in the Wardha district and 90% of the eastern part is in the district of Nagpur. The Bor reservoir area is 7.25 km² (2.80 sq mi) and is not included in the total area sanctuary.
