= Sindhutai Sapkal =

Indian social worker and activist (1948–2022)

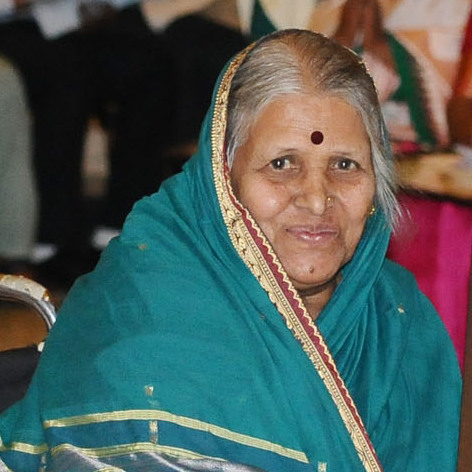
- Sapkal in 2018
- Born: Sindhu Abhimanyu Sathe; 14 November 1948; Wardha, Central Provinces and Berar, Dominion of India
- Died: 4 January 2022 (aged 73); Pune, Maharashtra, India
- Other names: Mai (lit. mother); Mother of orphans
- Occupations: Social worker; Social activist
- Spouse: Shrihari Sapkal
- Children: Arunbhau Sapkal; Mamata Sapkal
- Honours: Mother Teresa Awards (2013); Nari Shakti Puraskar (2017); Padma Shri (2021)
- Website: https://www.sindhutaisapkal.org/

Sindhu Shrihari Sapkal (14 November 1948 – 4 January 2022), affectionately called Sindhutai, was an Indian social worker and social activist known particularly for her work in raising orphaned children in India. She was awarded the Padma Shri in 2021 and many other awards in the Social Work category.

== Early life ==
Sapkal was born on 14 November 1948, in Pipri Meghe in Wardha district in the then Central Provinces and Berar of Dominion of India to Abhimanyu Sathe, a cowherder. Being an unwanted child, she was referred to as Chindhi (Marathi for "piece of rag"). Abject poverty, family responsibilities and childhood marriage to an older man forced her to quit formal education after she successfully passed her fourth standard. Sapkal was married off at age 12 to Shrihari Sapkal, who was 20 years older than her, and moved to Nawargaon, Seloo in Wardha. The marriage did not last long and at the age of 20, she was violently forced out of her home by her husband, leaving her on her own to care for a daughter.

== Early work with Adivasis ==
Sindhutai Sapkal later found herself in Chikhaldara, where she started begging for food. In the process, she realised that there were many children abandoned by their parents and she adopted them as her own. She had to beg even harder to feed the ever larger family. She decided to become a mother to everyone who came across to her as an orphan. She later gave away her own daughter to the Shrimant Dagdu Sheth Halwai trust of Pune, to eliminate the feeling of partiality between her own child and the adopted children.

Details of Sapkal's struggle were provided in the weekly Optimist Citizen on 18 May 2016:

In this constant tussle to survive, she found herself in Chikaldara, situated in the Amravati district of Maharashtra. Here, due to a tiger preservation project, 84 tribal villages were evacuated. Amidst the confusion, a project officer impounded 132 cows of Adivasi villagers and one of the cows died. Sapkal decided to fight for proper rehabilitation of the helpless tribal villagers. Her efforts were acknowledged by the Minister of Forests and he made appropriate arrangements for alternative relocation.

Sapkal fought for the rehabilitation of eighty-four villages. In the course of her agitation, she met Chhedilal Gupta, the then Minister of Forests. He agreed that the villagers should not be displaced before the government had made appropriate arrangements at alternative sites. When Prime Minister Indira Gandhi arrived to inaugurate the tiger project, Sapkal showed her photographs of an Adivasi who had lost his eyes to a wild bear. She is quoted as saying, "I told her that the forest department paid compensation if a cow or a hen was killed by a wild animal, so why not a human being? She immediately ordered compensation."

After being informed of the plight of orphaned and abandoned Adivasi children, Sapkal took care of the children in return for meager amounts of food. Shortly thereafter, it became the mission of her life.

== Orphanages ==
Sapkal devoted herself to orphans. As a result, she was fondly called "Mai", which means "mother". She nurtured over 1,500 orphaned children and through them had a grand family of 382 sons-in-law and 49 daughters-in-law. She has been honoured with more than 700 awards for her work. She used award money to buy land to make a home for orphaned children.

=== Organisations ===
- Mother Global Foundation, Pune
- Sanmati Bal Niketan, Bhelhekar Vasti, Manjri, Hadapsar, Pune - Dedicated to provide essential support to underprivileged children.
- Mamata Bal Sadan, Kumbharvalan near Saswad, Purandar taluka (started in 1994)
- Savitribai Phule Mulinche Vasatigruh (Girls' Hostel) Chikhaldara, Amravati
- Abhiman Bal Bhavan, Wardha
- Gangadharbaba Chhatralaya, Guha Shirdi
- Saptsindhu' Mahila Adhar, Balsangopan Aani Shikshan Sanstha, Pune
- Shree Manshanti Chatralaya, Shirur
- Vanvasi Gopal Krishna Bahuuddeshiya Mandal Amaravati

== Death ==
She died of a heart attack in Pune, Maharashtra, on 4 January 2022, at the age of 73.

== Awards ==
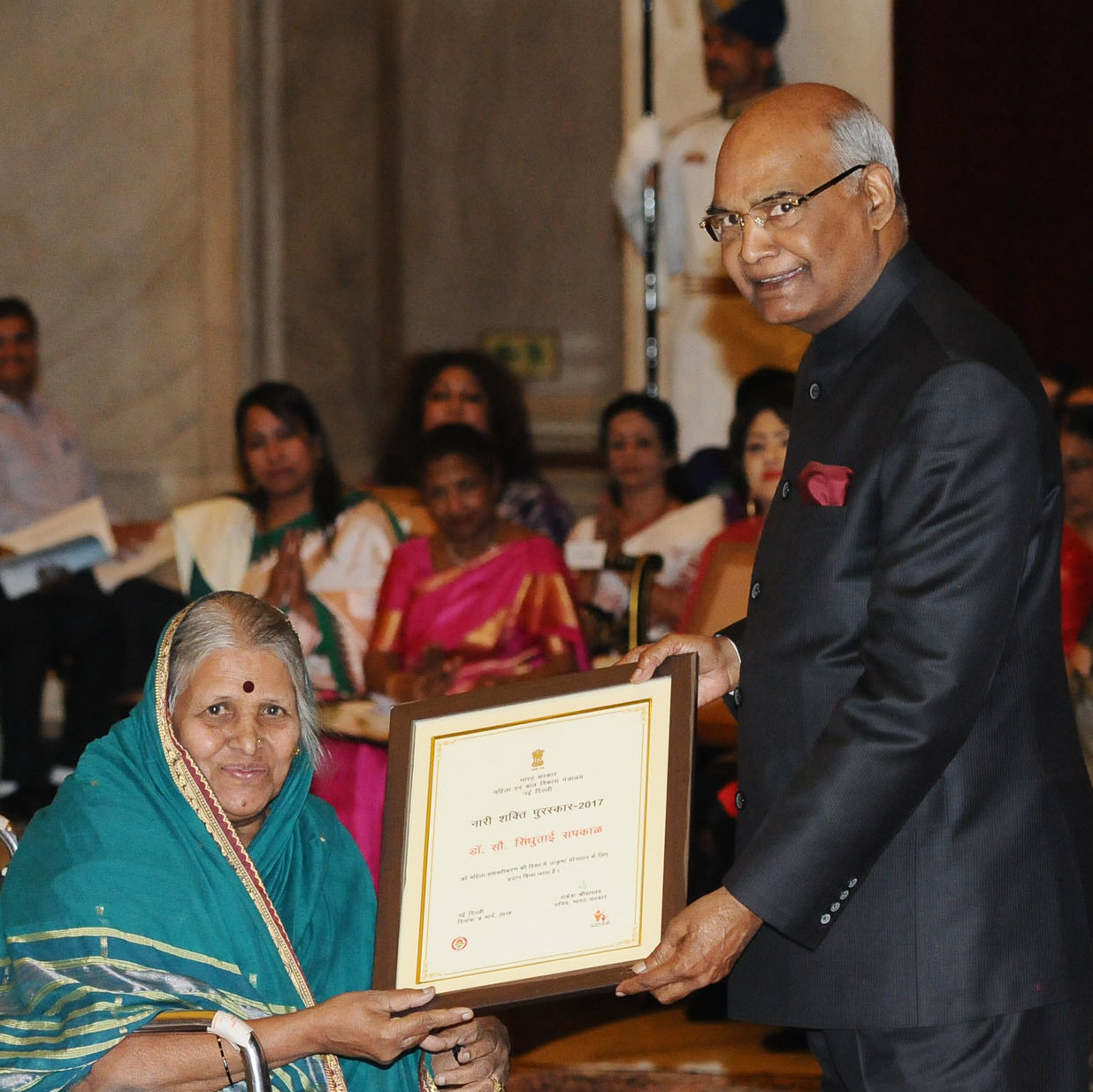
President Ram Nath Kovind presenting the Nari Shakti Puraskar to Sapkal in 2017

- 2021 - Global International Women's Day Award by JKYog
- 2021 - Padma Shri in the Social Work category
- 2017 – Nari Shakti Puraskar from the President Of India
- 2016 – Honorary doctorate by the Dr. D. Y. Patil College of Engineering, Pune
- 2016 – Social Worker of the Year award from Wockhardt Foundation
- 2014 – Ahmadiyya Muslim Peace Prize
- 2013 – Mother Teresa Awards for Social Justice
- 2013 – The National Award for Iconic Mother
- 2012 – Real Heroes Awards, given by CNN-IBN and Reliance Foundation
- 2012 – COEP Gaurav Puraskar, given by College of Engineering, Pune
- 2010 – Ahilyabai Holkar Award, given by the Government of Maharashtra to social workers in the field of women and child welfare
- 2008 – Women of the Year Award, given by daily Marathi newspaper Loksatta
- 1996 – Dattak Mata Purskar, given by Non Profit Organization Sunita Kalaniketan Trust
- Sahyadri Hirkani Award (Marathi: सह्याद्रीची हिरकणी पुरस्कार)
- Rajai Award (Marathi: राजाई पुरस्कार)
- Shivleela Mahila Gaurav Award (Marathi: शिवलीला महिला गौरव पुरस्कार)

== In popular culture ==
- Mee Sindhutai Sapkal, a 2010 Indian Marathi-language biographical film directed by Anant Mahadevan and starring Tejaswini Pandit as Sakpal. The film was selected for world premiere at the 54th London Film Festival.
- Sindhutai Maazi Maai, a television serial aired on Colors Marathi from 2023 to 2024, where Shivani Sonar played Sakpal.
