= Sindi Turf Hindnagar =

Sindi Turf Hindnagar Sindi Railway
- Census town
- Nickname: pola city
- Location in Maharashtra, India
- Coordinates: 20.8117°N 78.8931°E
- Country: India
- State: Maharashtra
- District: Wardha

Population (2001)
  - Total: 15,549

Languages
  - Official: Marathi
- Time zone: UTC+5:30 (IST)

Sindi Turf Hindnagar is a census town in Wardha district in the Indian state of Maharashtra.

== Demographics ==
As of 2001 India census, Sindi Turf Hindnagar had a population of 15,549. Males constitute 52% of the population and females 48%. Sindi Turf Hindnagar has an average literacy rate of 79%, higher than the national average of 59.5%: male literacy is 83%, and female literacy is 74%. In Sindi Turf Hindnagar, 11% of the population is under 6 years of age.

Year	Male	Female	Total Population	Change	Religion (%)							
Year	Male	Female	Total Population	Change	Hindu	Muslim	Christian	Sikhs	Buddhist	Jain	Other religions and persuasions	Religion not stated
2001	8068	7486	15554	-	70.316	1.247	0.617	0.135	26.598	0.739	0.039	0.309
2011	10823	10133	20956	34.731	68.338	0.496	0.558	0.038	29.467	0.816	0.258	0.029

View source data.
View source data.
