= Bor Wildlife Sanctuary =

Wildlife sanctuary in Maharashtra, India

- IUCN category IV (habitat/species management area)
- Location within Maharashtra Location within India
- Interactive map of Bor Wildlife Sanctuary
- Location: Wardha District, Maharashtra, India
- Coordinates: 20°58′39″N 78°40′33″E
- Area: 138.12 km^{2} (53.33 sq mi)
- Established: 2014 (Tiger Reserve)

Bor Tiger Reserve is a wildlife sanctuary which was declared as a tiger reserve in July 2014. It is located near Hingani in Wardha District in the Indian state of Maharashtra. It is a home to a variety of wild animals. The reserve covers an area of 138.12 km^{2} (53.33 sq mi). which includes the drainage basin of the Bor Dam.

It is notable that Bor Tiger Reserve and some adjacent protected areas will be merged with Pench Tiger Reserve (Maharashtra) as a 'Satellite core area', to more than double the area of that well established tiger reserve.

Bor Tiger Reserve is centrally located among several other Bengal tiger habitats including: Pench Tiger Reserve, Maharashtra, 90 km^{2} (35 sq mi) to the northeast; Nagzira Navegaon Tiger Reserve, 125 km^{2} (48 sq mi) to the east northeast; Umred Karhandla Wildlife Sanctuary, 75 km^{2} (29 sq mi) to the east southeast; Tadoba - Andhari Tiger Reserve, 85 km^{2} (33 sq mi) to the southeast; Melghat Tiger Reserve, 140 km^{2} (54 sq mi) to the west northwest and Satpura National Park and Tiger Reserve, 160 km^{2} (62 sq mi) to the northwest.

== Zones ==
In April 2012, the Maharashtra state government issued a notification adding 60 km^{2} (23 sq mi) to the old 61.1 km^{2} (23.6 sq mi) area of the Bor Sanctuary. The new Core Zone of 115.92 km^{2} (44.76 sq mi) is the most protected and inviolate part of the sanctuary where the public is not allowed. It comprises 95.7% of the total area. Most of the core area is contiguous with the good forest of the Wardha Forest Division and Nagpur Forest Division.

The Eco-tourism Zone of 5.21 km^{2} (2.01 sq mi) designated for public access for nature and wildlife tourism comprises 4.3% of the total sanctuary area. The purpose of the tourism zone is to educate the public about the significance of nature and wildlife conservation and to stimulate their environmental awareness.

The Buffer Zone is less protected forest area near the sanctuary that serves as a protective barrier for the core area.

The Bor Tiger Reserve is physically divided by the Bor Reservoir into 2 sections, previously; 2/3 (40 km^{2} (15 sq mi)), as the west part and 1/3 (21 km^{2} (8.1 sq mi)), as the eastern part. 95% of the western part is in Wardha district and 90% of the eastern part is in Nagpur district. The Bor Reservoir area is about 7.25 km^{2} (2.80 sq mi) and is not included in the total sanctuary area.

== Climate ==
There are three seasons; summer, winter and the rainy season.

== Culture ==
There are Buddhist temple(vihar) where buddhist teaching takes place .There are some religious places in the sanctuary such as a Shiva temple at Khori-Khapa, Bruhaspati Temple at Chauki, Hanuman Temple at Khadki and Ganesh Temple at Kelzar.

It is believed this was an important place in Mahabharata time, namely about the early Gupta period (c. 4th century CE). Archaeological remains known as Nasargarh and Gidamgarh reveal the existence of a seat of power here in the beginning of the 1st century.

== Flora ==
The sanctuary is in the South Deccan Plateau dry deciduous forests ecoregion, with the main species being teak, ain, tendu (East Indian ebony) and bamboo.

The main herbs found in the sanctuary are tarot, tenella, tarwar, gokhru, wight (bracteata), vanbhendi, velatri and waghori.

== Fauna ==
Mammal species such as the Bengal tiger, Indian leopard, Indian bison, blue bull, chital, sambar deer, peacock, barking deer, mouse deer, monkey, wild boar, sloth bear, and wild dog live here.

Tigers

As per the 2010-11 tiger estimation report, there are 24 tigers in the Pench and Bor landscape. The Wildlife Institute of India (WII) estimated the presence of 12 tigers in and around the sanctuary but the number has increased to 15, with three new cubs sighted in March 2011. A tigress with two-month-old cubs; one male and two females, was first sighted by the field staff in the sanctuary's core zone.

The annual births of new tiger cubs shows that the Bor is a breeding ground for tigers, with cubs born here each of the past four years. In 2008, a tigress had three cubs, then one more tigress had two cubs in 2009, followed by another tigress with one cub in 2010 and three cubs in 2011.

The field director of Pench Tiger Reserve said the 2011 births seem to be the first litter of this tigress. "Better protection, good prey base and availability of water are three key factors why Bor is becoming a safe haven for tigers."

Birds

There are more than 160 species of birds belonging to 46 families of 16 different orders recorded in the sanctuary. This includes over 10 species of migratory birds and over 9 species of endangered birds.

Reptiles

The reserve is home to over 26 species of reptiles belonging 11 families, of which 6 species are endangered, namely, Indian cobra, Russell's viper, Indian rock python, Indian rat snake, Chequered keelback and monitor lizard.

== Tiger reserve proposal ==
On 13 September 2010, the intention to create a Bor Tiger Reserve was announced by the then Minister of Environment and Forests, Jairam Ramesh. The Maharashtra Forest Department later decided that the Bor Wildlife Sanctuary is too small to be declared as a tiger reserve. It has become the 47th tiger reserve in India with Environment Minister Prakash Javadekar notifying it as a tiger reserve with an aim to strengthen the conservation efforts of the national animal on 7 July 2014.

"It is not practical to declare Bor a reserve. It is well connected to Pench Tiger Reserve and Mansingdeo wildlife sanctuary adjoining Pench, and is also a wildlife corridor. All this area will now be part of Pench", said S.K. Khetarpal, Principal Chief Conservator of Forests (PCCF) for Wildlife, Maharashtra.

Bor sanctuary will now be extended to 120.39 km^{2} (46.48 sq mi). It will include the existing sanctuary area of 59.70 km^{2} (23.05 sq mi) and adjoining 12.24 km^{2} (4.73 sq mi) from Nagpur and 48.46 km^{2} (18.71 sq mi) from Wardha division. The expanded 120.39 km^{2} (46.48 sq mi) Bor will be a 'satellite' core of the 257.23 km^{2} (99.32 sq mi) Pench along with 172.86 km^{2} (66.74 sq mi) Mansingdeo sanctuary. If these three areas are fully consolidated, Pench will then become 550.47 km^{2} (212.54 sq mi), a 2.14 times increase in area.

"The Bor sanctuary is an important 'satellite' area which has the potential to serve as a 'stepping stone' for tigers dispersing from the source area of Pench",

== Conservation ==
The wildlife sanctuary, including a nature interpretation center and tourism complex is operated under the authority of the Addl. Principal Chief Conservator of Forests-Wildlife-East, Nagpur circle.

Since 2005, the wildlife conservation NGO Srushti Paryavaran Mandal in association with the Maharashtra Forest Department-Pench Tiger Reserve office has been working on several conservation projects in the Bor Sanctuary, including water conservation through building small check dams, habitat mapping and rehabilitation of orphaned tiger cubs.

== Threats ==
The sanctuary needs enhanced protection and habitat management, especially in the adjacent forest areas. The biggest threat to Bor is forest fires. In 2011 around 800 ha (3.1 mi^{2}) of forest was destroyed by ground fire. Tendu collection in the 5 km (3.1 mi) buffer area around the sanctuary needs to be banned completely."

Increasing numbers of tigers has led to an increase in tiger attacks. In January, 2011 three villagers were attacked outside the sanctuary. As the attacks were outside the sanctuary compensation was not paid. Villagers have been speaking against tigers owing to attacks and cattle kills. Delay or nonpayment of compensation has moved the villagers' attitude against tigers.

== Visitor information ==
MSH 3

The best time to visit is in April and May. The sanctuary is closed on Mondays.

Traveling on the Wardha-Nagpur road MSH3, one must turn north at Seloo for Hingi and then to the visitor center at Bor Dam.
The nearest bus station is Hingni 5 km (3.1 mi) from the sanctuary.
The nearest railway station is at Wardha about 35 km (22 mi) away.
The nearest airport is Dr. Babasaheb Ambedkar International Airport at Nagpur 80 km (50 mi)away.

Promotion of wildlife tourism was planned in 2002 for Bhor Dam, on the outskirts of Bhor Wildlife Sanctuary at the project cost of Rs 6.2 million. The MTDC Resort now offers 10 double-bed rooms, three dormitories, and restaurant facilities.

== External sources ==
- Map Bor Wildlife Sanctuary
- Photos of a tiger captured by camera trap at Bor Sanctuary, 7 February 2010
