= Sindi, Maharashtra =

Sindi Pola city
- city
- Location in Maharashtra, India
- Coordinates: 20.8°N 78.87°E
- Country: India
- State: Maharashtra
- District: Wardha
- Elevation: 243 m (797 ft)

Population (2012)
  - Total: 18,200

Languages
  - Official: Marathi and Hindi
- Time zone: UTC+5:30 (IST)
- Postal code: 442105
- ISO 3166 code: IN-MH
- Website: maharashtra.gov.in

Sindi is a city and a municipal council in Wardha district. Sindi is also known as Pola city. Sindi railway station is important stop between Wardha-Nagpur central rail route.

== Geography ==
Sindi is located at 20.8°N 78.87°E. It has an average elevation of 243 metres (797 feet).

== Transport ==
There is a railway Station on Wardha - Nagpur line of Central Railways. Wardha to Sindi Bus (MSRTC) NAGPUR TO SINDI BUS (MSRTC)

== Demographics ==
As of 2001 India census, Sindi had a population of 13,052. Males constitute 52% of the population and females 48%. Sindi has an average literacy rate of 73%, higher than the national average of 59.5%: male literacy is 79%, and female literacy is 67%. In Sindi, 12% of the population is under 6 years of age.
