= State Highway 265 (Maharashtra) =

Road in Maharashtra, India

State Highway 265

Route information
- Maintained by MSRDC
- Length: 43 km (27 mi)

Major junctions
- North end: Savner, Nagpur
- South end: Mohgoan village connected with MH SH 255, Nagpur

Location
- Country: India
- State: Maharashtra
- Districts: Nagpur
- Primary destinations: Savner, Kalmeshwar, Gondakhari

Highway system
- Roads in India; Expressways; National; State; Asian; State Highways in Maharashtra

Maharashtra State Highway 265 SH265 is a normal state highway in Nagpur, in the state of Maharashtra. This state highway touches Savner, Kalmeshwar, and Gondakhari National Highway 53.State Highway 275 (Maharashtra)

== Summary ==
This road is one of the important road in Nagpur District providing connectivity with three National Highway NH 69, NH 26 B, and NH-6.

== Major junctions ==
This highway started from the intersection at Savner town with NH 69, crossing MH SH 248, at Kalmeshwar, NH-6 at Gondkhari village and end at Mohagoan village connecting with MH SH 255.

== Connections ==
Many villages, cities and towns in Nagpur District are connecting by this state highway.

- Savner
- Adasa
- Dapewada
- Kalmeshwar
- Gondkhari

Other Important Landmark on this highway.

- Veena Dam
- Zilpi Lake
- MIDC Kalmeshwar
- Dapewada Vittal Temple
- Adasa Ganpati Temple.

== See also ==
- List of state highways in Maharashtra
