= Pench Tiger Reserve =

Tiger Reserve in Central India

- IUCN category II (national park)
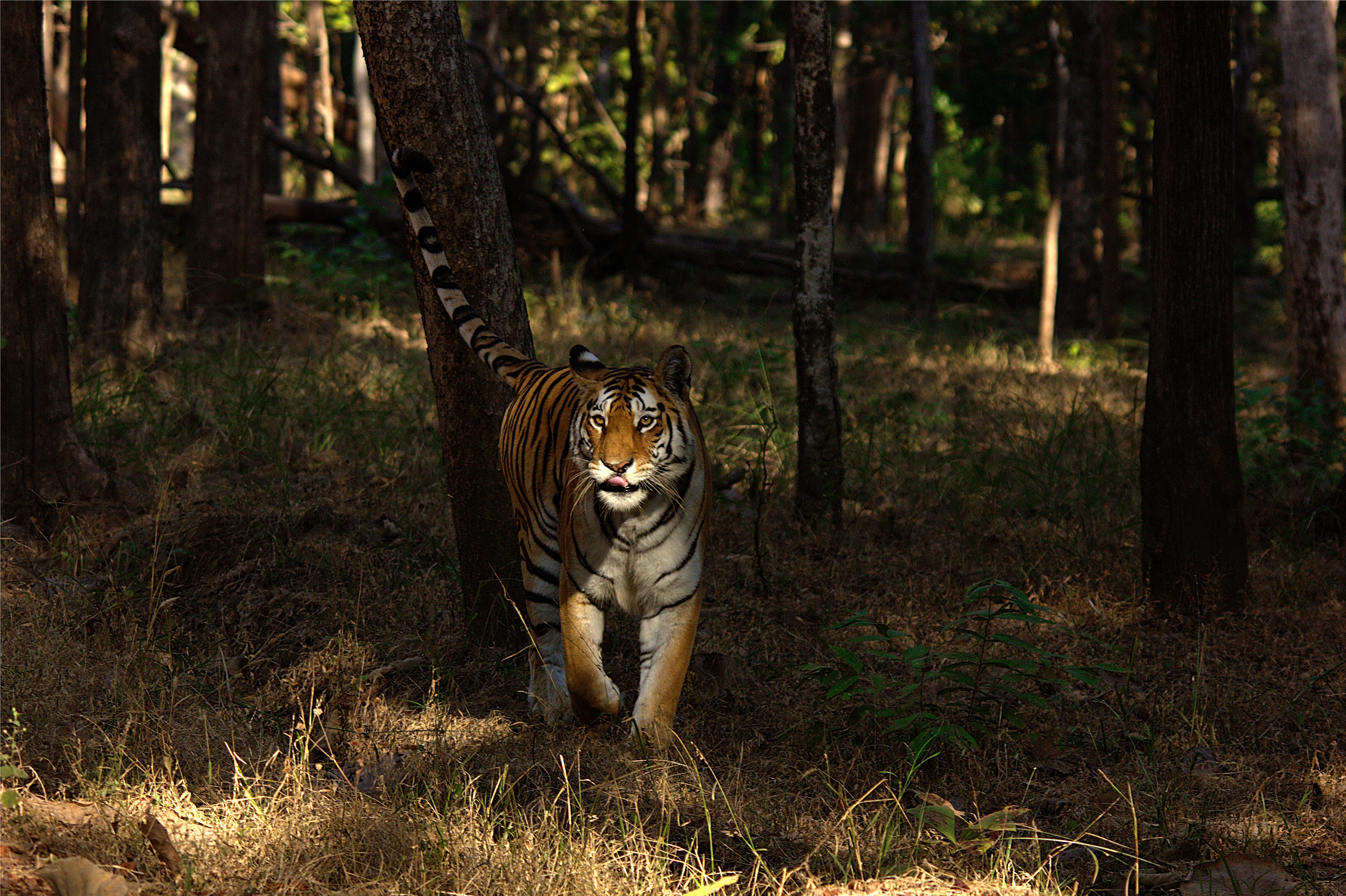
- Tigress in Pench Tiger Reserve

- Location within Madhya Pradesh Location within Maharashtra Location within India
- Interactive map of Pench Tiger Reserve
- Location: Seoni District and Chhindwara district, Madhya Pradesh; Nagpur district, Maharashtra, India
- Coordinates: 21°41′35″N 79°14′54″E
- Area: 1,179.63 km^{2} (455.46 sq mi)
- Established: 1977
- Website: penchtigerreserve.maharashtra.gov.in

Pench Tiger Reserve is a tiger reserve in India straddling across Madhya Pradesh and Maharashtra. On the Madhya Pradesh side, it encompasses a core area of 411.33 km^{2} (158.82 sq mi), with a buffer of 768.3 km^{2} (296.6 sq mi), making for a total protected area of 1,179.63 km^{2} (455.46 sq mi). On the Maharashtra side, the Pench Tiger Reserve has a core habitat area of 257.3 km^{2} (99.3 sq mi) along with a buffer zone of 483.96 km^{2} (186.86 sq mi) making total protected area of 741.2 km^{2} (286.2 sq mi). Pench Tiger Reserve comprises Pench National Park, Mowgli Pench Sanctuary and a buffer area, which span more than 1,920 km^{2} (740 sq mi).

== History ==
Pench Sanctuary was created in September 1977, with an initial area of 449.39 km^{2}. Pench National Park, recently renamed as Indira Priyadarshini Pench National Park, was created in 1983, carved out of the Sanctuary. The Tiger Reserve, 19th in the series, was formed under the Project Tiger scheme in November 1992. The fictional works of Rudyard Kipling, The Jungle Book and The Second Jungle Book, are set in the region. Kipling himself never visited the area, instead basing his descriptions on other locations in India.

Bor Wildlife Sanctuary and some adjacent protected areas will be merged with Pench Tiger Reserve (Maharashtra), as a 'Satellite core area', to more than double the area of that tiger reserve.

== Geography ==
Pench Tiger Reserve located in Seoni district and Chhindwara district of Madhya Pradesh and Nagpur district of Maharashtra. It gets its name from the Pench River that flows 74 km (46 mi) north to south through the reserve. The Pench River bisects the original Pench core reserve into two nearly equal parts; the 147.61 km^{2} (56.99 sq mi) of the Western Block which falls in the Gumtara Range of the Chhindwara district forest division and the 145.24 km^{2} (56.08 sq mi) of the Eastern Block in the Karmajhiri Range of the Seoni district forest division. The Reserve lies in the southern lower reaches of the Satpura Range of hills.

Pench Tiger Reserve derives its name from its life line, the Pench River. Inside the park, the river flows from north to south before joining the Kanhan River. The Meghdoot dam built across Pench River at Totaladoh has created a large water body of 72 km^{2} (28 sq mi) out of which 54 km^{2} (21 sq mi) falls in Madhya Pradesh and the rest in the adjoining state of Maharashtra. The Pench River emerges from Mahadeo Hills of Satpura Range and the various nallas and streams which drain into it.

=== Climate ===
The Central Indian Highlands have a tropical monsoonal climate, with a distinct monsoon (July to September), winter (November to February), and summer (April to June). The mean annual rainfall is around 1,400 mm, with the south-west monsoon accounting for most of the rainfall in the region. For the dry season (November to May), the mean rainfall is 59.5 mm, and the temperature varies from a minimum of 0 °C in winter to 45 °C in summer.

== Flora ==
Pench Tiger Reserve belongs to the Indo-Malayan phytogeographical region and is categorized as a tropical moist deciduous habitat. Floristically, Pench Tiger Reserve can be classified, according to Champion and Seth (1968) as Tropical Moist Deciduous Forests and Tropical Dry Deciduous Forests.

Teak is a ubiquitous species in the region, with a presence ranging from a sporadic distribution in most parts of the study area to localized teak-dominated patches. Teak (Tectona grandis), and associated species such as Madhuca indica, Diospyros melanoxylon, Terminalia tomentosa, Buchanania lanzan, Lagerstroemia parviflora, Ougeinia dalbergoides, Miliusa velutina and Lannea coromandalica, occur on flat terrain. The undulating terrain and hill slopes have patches of Mixed Forest dominated by Boswellia serrata and Anogeissus latifolia. Species like Sterculia urens and Gardenia latifolia are found scattered on rocky slopes. Bamboo forests occur in the hill slopes and along streams. Some of the open patches of the Park are covered with tall grasses interspersed with Butea monosperma and Zizyphus mauritiana. Evergreen tree species like Terminalia arjuna, Syzygium cumini and Ixora parviflora are found in riparian vegetation along nullahs and river banks. Cleistanthus collinus dominant patches are also found in some parts of the Tiger Reserve. The tracts that previously formed pastures of villages (subsequently relocated outside the National Park limits) now constitute open grassy meadows much favoured by the gregarious herbivores. With the approach of summer, the extent of open areas of the Reserve gradually increases with the recession of reservoir's waters.

== Fauna ==
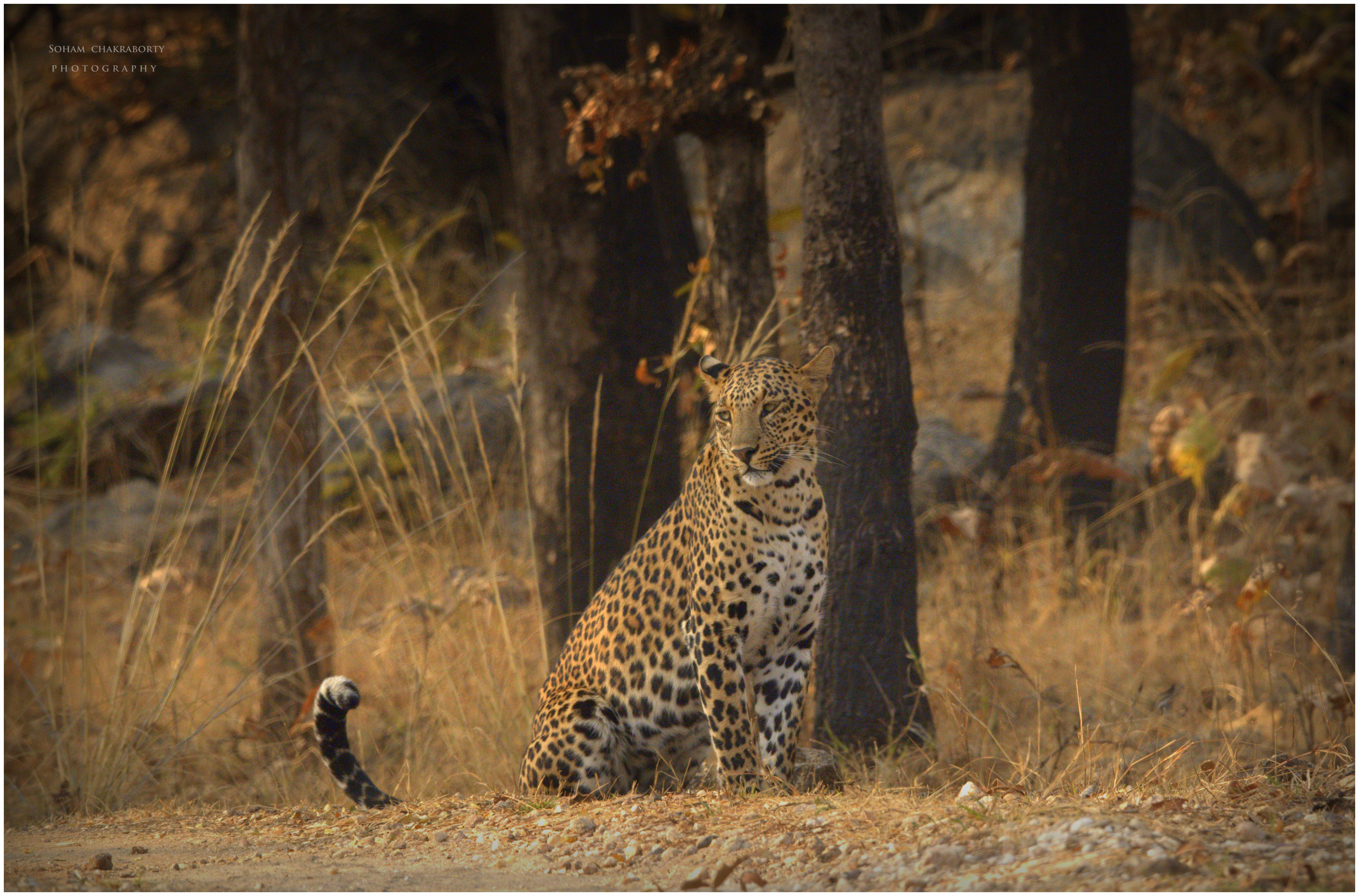
Leopard at Pench (MP)

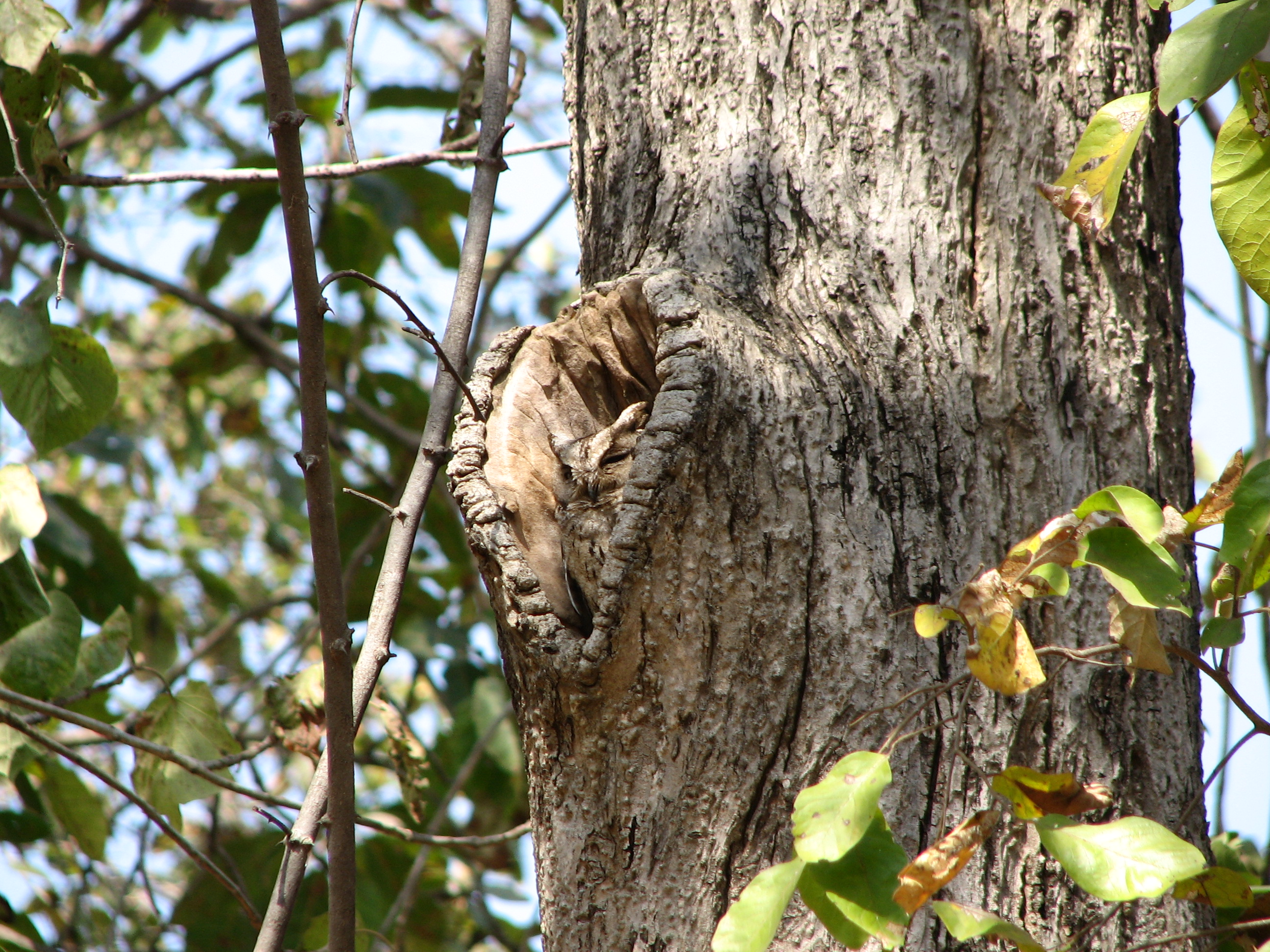
Owl in Pench National Park

Zoogeographically, the Reserve falls in Oriental region. The carnivore fauna is represented by the Bengal tiger (Panthera tigris tigris), Indian leopard (Panthera pardus), dhole (Cuon alpinus), jungle cat (Felis chaus), and small Indian civet (Viverricula indica). Wolves (Canis lupus pallipes) occur on the fringes and outside the Reserve limits. Striped hyena (Hyaena hyaena), sloth bear (Melursus ursinus), golden jackal (Canis aureus), and Asian palm civet (Paradoxurus hermaphroditus) make up the rest of the carnivore fauna of the Reserve. Chital (Axis axis), sambar (Cervus unicolor), gaur (Bos gaurus), nilgai (Boselaphus tragocamelus), wild pig (Sus scrofa), Indian muntjac (Muntiacus muntjac) and chowsingha (Tetraceros quadricornis), are the wild ungulate species found in the study area. Chital, sambar, nilgai and wild pigs are found all over the Tiger Reserve. With the distribution of water governing their movement patterns to a great extent, gaur migrate down from the hills during the dry season and occupy the forests along the Pench River and other sources of water, and migrate back to the hill forests during the monsoon. Nilgai are found mostly in a few open areas, along forest roads, scrub jungles and fringe areas of the Reserve. Chowsingha are more localized to the greatly undulating areas of the Reserve. Barking deer are seen infrequently in moist riverine stretches. Chinkara (Gazella bennetti) are infrequently seen on the open areas bordering and outside the Buffer Zone of the Reserve (e.g. Turia, Telia, and Dudhgaon).

The common northern plains gray langur (Semnopithecus entellus) and rhesus macaque (Macaca mulatta) represent the primate fauna of the area. The Indian porcupine (Hystrix indica), two species of mongoose viz. Indian grey mongoose (Urva edwardsii) and ruddy mongoose (Urva smithii), and Indian hare (Lepus nigricollis) also occur in this Tiger Reserve.

=== Famous tigers ===
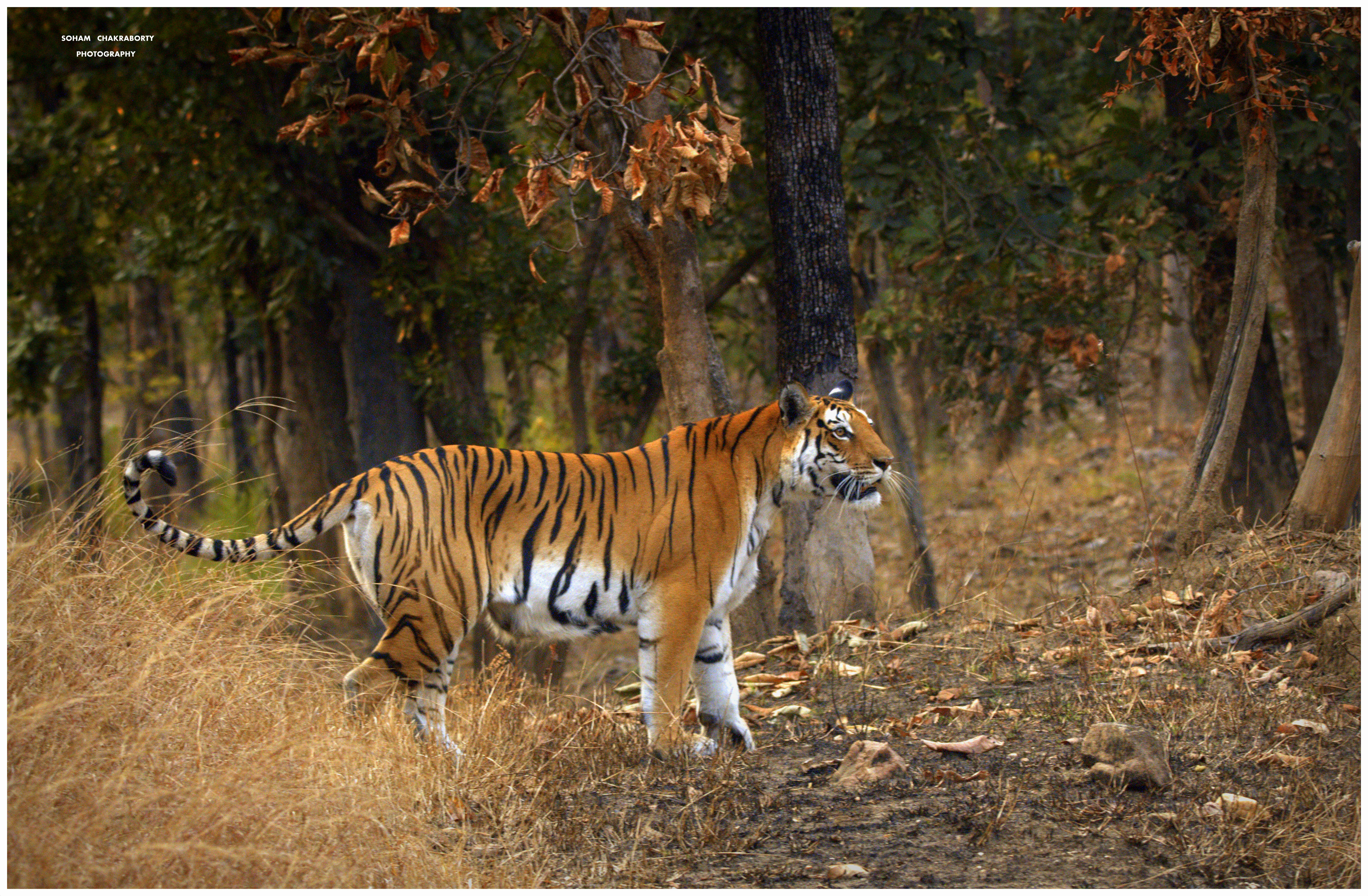
Patdev female of Pench Tiger Reserve

One of the tigresses in the reserve, Badi Mada or Barimada ('Big Mother'), became well known for giving birth to 29 cubs over 17 years.

Collarwali, a daughter of Badi Mada, starred with her mother in the BBC Wildlife Special Tiger: Spy in the Jungle, which popularised the reserve. She became one of India's best known tigers, giving birth to 26 cubs in 7 litters as of April 2017 and 29 cubs in 8 litters by her death in January 2022 at the age of 16. Born in 2005 and initially dubbed T-15, she acquired the name Collarwali ('The One With a Collar') after being the first tigress in the park fitted with a radio collar, in 2008. She was unusually large for a female and because she was comparatively friendly, was the most frequently seen tiger in the park. In 2010 she gave birth to an unusually large litter, 5 cubs. Of Collarwali's cubs, records indicate 14 of the 18 born by 2013 and 17 of the 22 from her first 6 litters survived to adulthood. They have dispersed to other parts of Pench and some may have crossed over to other tiger reserves such as Kanha National Park. For example, in December 2010, male T-39, born in her second litter in October 2008, travelled more than 50 km to near the boundary of the reserve. She died in January 2022 and was cremated by a local tribal leader.

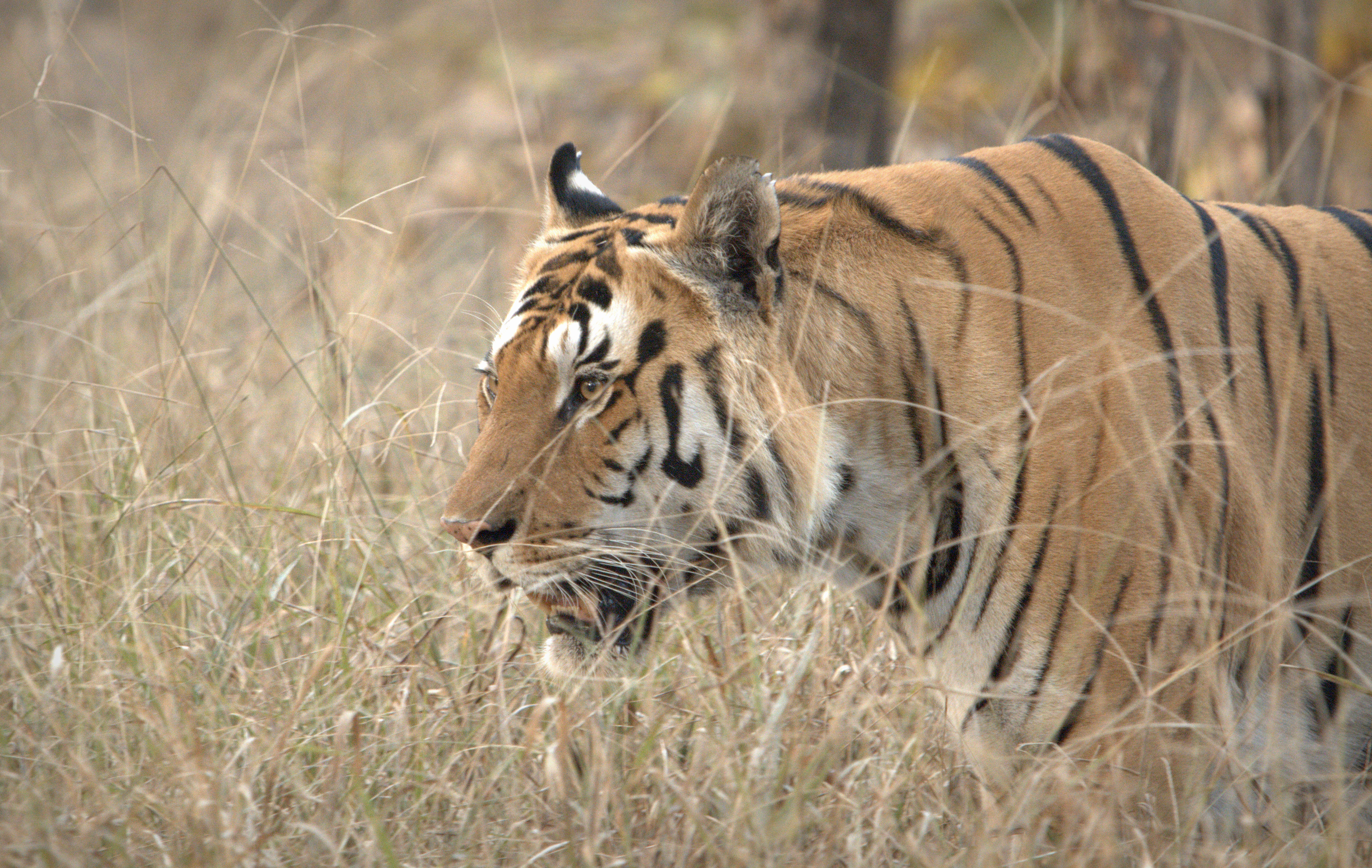
Swastik, a huge male tiger of Pench (MP).

The Baghin nala female or Baghinnalawali female, a littermate of Collarwali, was so-named because she established a territory close to a nullah (watercourse). Although shy, she was popular with tourists visiting Pench. However, on 28 and 29 March 2016, she and two 8-month-old cubs were found dead inside the core area of the tiger reserve, not far from a patrolling camp. Post-mortem examination confirmed poisoning, and three men were arrested in early April, suspected of having poisoned a deer that the tigers had later eaten.

Langdi also called T-20 Langdi was born in 2008, famous for her limp in front paw due to a congenital deformity in one leg which gave her this name.She is the sister of the renowned Collarwali tigress. She died of old age on 7 March 2026 at the age of 18, after an extraordinarily long life for a tiger; tigers usually live to 15 or 16. She gave birth to 10 cubs during her lifetime, including the famous tigers L Mark, Lakshmi, and Bijamatta.

== Research in Pench ==
Long-term research in Pench was initiated by the study on the interactions between wild animal and their n the Pench Sanctuary by Shukla (1990). This was followed by a tiger-prey estimation study by Karanth and Nichols (1998). Since 1995 the Wildlife Institute of India has initiated a series of studies beginning with a long-term radio telemetry study on the gaur (Bos frontalis) (Sankar et al. 2000a), followed by the creation of a spatial mapping database for the Tiger Reserve (Sankar et al. 2000b). Short-term Master's studies at the Wildlife Institute of India increased the knowledge on avifauna (Jayapal 1997), wild herbivores (Acharya 1997) tiger food habits and the diversity and distribution of the avifauna in Pench Tiger Reserve.

== Threats ==
Wildlife in Pench Tiger Reserve is threatened by poaching gangs working in and around Pench Tiger Reserve. In 2016, a tigress and her cubs were killed by poisoning. Another notorious series of incidents occurred in 2017.

Pench Tiger Reserve is under growing pressure from poaching, encroachment, grazing and forest degradation, which together threaten tiger habitat and prey populations. Recent research from PTR Maharashtra recorded livestock grazing across 15.33% of the reserve area, showing heavy human use disturb grasslands and forest edges.

Forest destruction increases due to illegal encroachment and converting woodland into farms. In the Satpuda–Pench corridor about 180 sq km forest loss linked to mining and encroachments, reducing safe movement routes for wildlife.
