= Ashti, Wardha =

Ashti Ashti
- Urban
- Location in Maharashtra, India
- Coordinates: 21°12′31.46″N 78°11′22.7″E
- Country: India
- State: Maharashtra
- District: Wardha
- Founder: Nawab Mohmmad Khan Niazi who was an Afghan noblemen. He worked as a mansabdar and jagirdar in the Mughal empire during the reign of Emperor Akbar.

Languages
  - Official: Marathi
- Time zone: UTC+5:30 (IST)
- Postal code: 442202
- ISO 3166 code: IN-MH
- Vehicle registration: MH-32

Ashti (Shahid) is a town and the tehsil headquarters in Arvi subdivision of Wardha district in the Indian state of Maharashtra. Ashti is a historical place famous for the participation in Indian independence movement and Tomb of Nawab Muhammad khan Niazi . People actively took part in Quit India Movement in 1942. Ashti is also known as shahidon ki Ashti.

== Etymology ==
Ashti word is a name of boy which from Arabic and Persian language Meaning of Ashti is peace in Arabic and Persian language. So the name of Town is Ashti and nowadays Ashti is called as shahid Ashti due freedom fight in 1942 for Indian independence movement. Title "Shahid" is dedicated to freedom fighters.

== Demographics ==
As per Indian government Census of 2011, the population was 76276.

Year	Male	Female	Total Population	Change	Religion (%)							
Year	Male	Female	Total Population	Change	Hindu	Muslim	Christian	Sikhs	Buddhist	Jain	Other religions and persuasions	Religion not stated
2001	38037	35557	73594	-	81.200	6.855	0.067	0.720	10.485	0.151	0.234	0.289
2011	39319	36957	76276	3.644	80.727	7.478	0.110	0.975	10.455	0.114	0.009	0.131

== History ==
- In August 1942, Mr. Gandhi announced the start of Quit India Movement. In response to this, people from Ashti and its nearby villages decided to actively take part in the Quit India Movement on date of 16 August 1942.
- In Mughal era, the Ashti was pergana under the guidance of Afghan Nobleman Nawab Muhammad Khan Niazi and his sons. His tomb and his son Nawab Ahmad Khan Niazi's tomb are located in Ashti.

== Places of interest in Ashti ==
- Dargah of pir Bayazid Bostami(R.A). Dargah is situated on the top of the hill. Every year on 15 Shaban, Urs is held on this dargah.
- Vitthal Mandir Ashti
- British police station, but today is office of H.R.V school Ashti. On this spot, a freedom fighter was killed on 16 August 1942.
- Jama Masjid Pethahmadpur or Maqbara Masjid. It is situated at pethahmadpur, which is an historical mosque built by Nawab Ahmad Khan Niazi in 1626 A.D.
- Baoli is located near Jama masjid pethahmadpur. Baoli is a water well which was built by Nawab Ahmad Khan Niazi. Its construction is so simple, but it is deep and made by black stone and sandstone.
- Tomb of Nawab Muhammad Khan Niazi and his son Nawab Ahmad Khan Niazi. The tomb is built in Mughal style. Nawab Muhammad Khan Niazi was an Afghan Nobleman who worked as Subedar in Mughal Court.

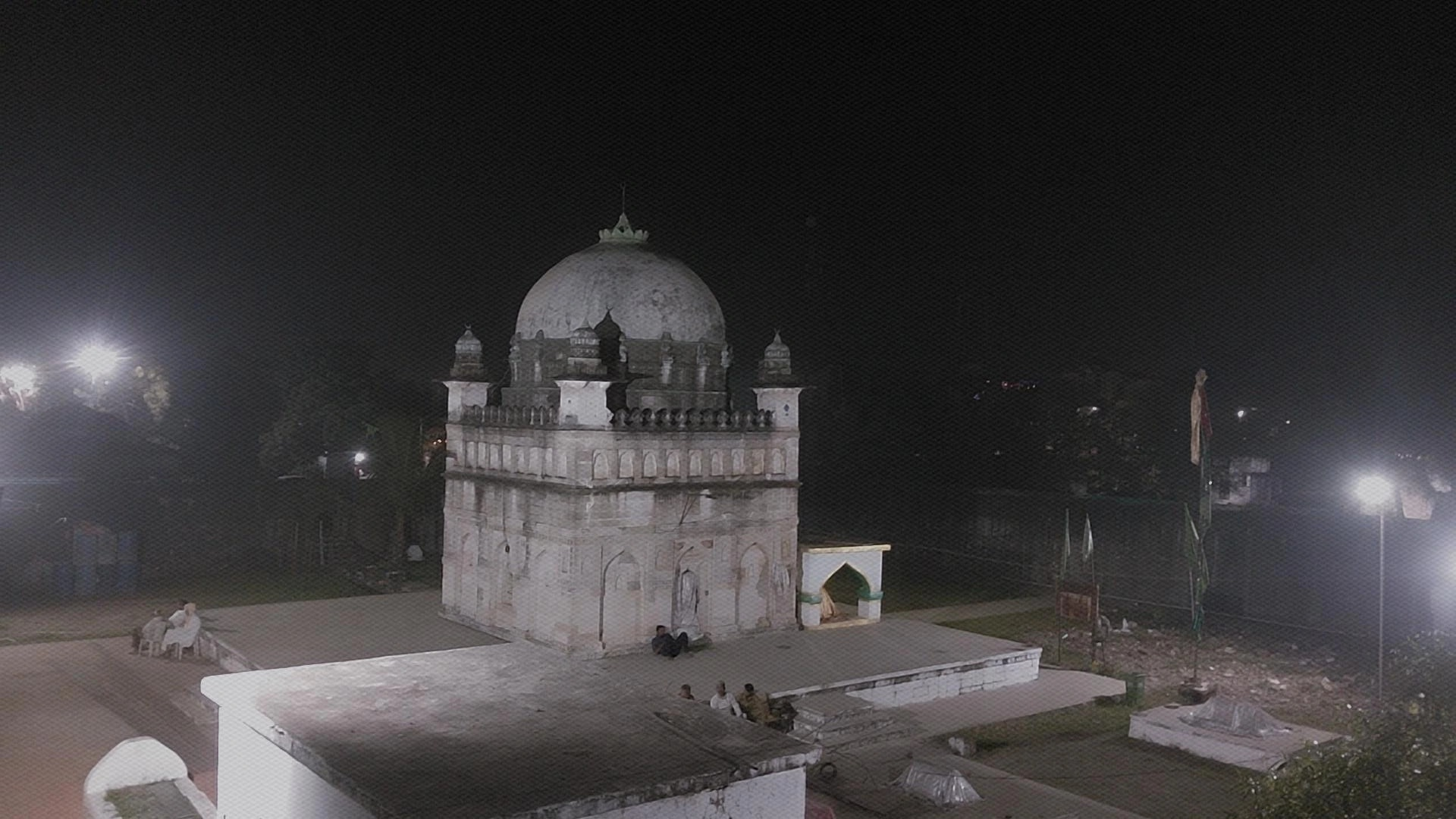
Tomb of Muhammad Khan Niazi

- Ahmad Khan Niazi Maqbara
- Lodhi Masjid is a historical mosque. This mosque consists of six domes. According to Persian inscription on mosque Ibrahim Khan Lodhi built this mosque.
- Kapileshwar Dham it is a Temple which is located at Kapileshwar dam. This Temple is dedicated to Lord Shiva.

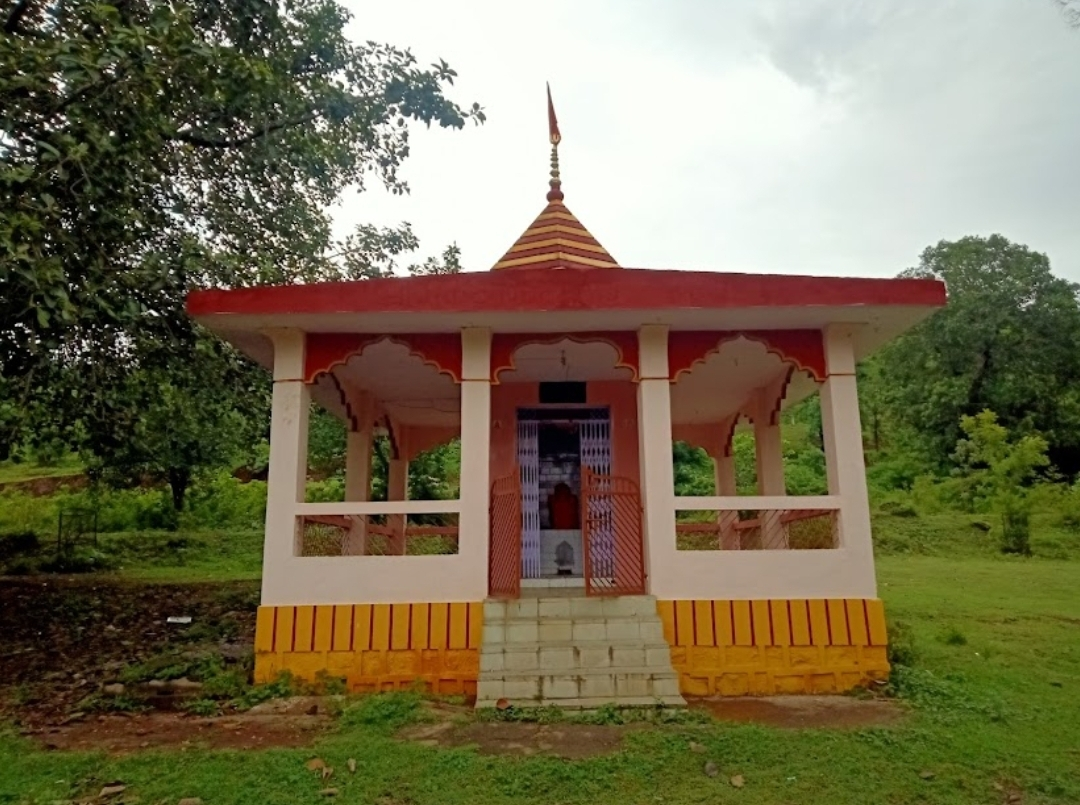
Hanuman temple near Kapileshwar Dham

- Shahid Smarak Ashti situated at the river bank of Bakli river. It is Martyrs Memorial which is dedicated to freedom fighter.
- Chor Baoli, located in Imli Pura, Ashti, is a stepwell built by the British..

== Sister City and Towns ==
- Chimur( Historically).
- Amner(Historically).
- Talegoan Dasshasar(Historically).
