= Deoli, Maharashtra =

Deoli
- city
- Location in Maharashtra, India
- Coordinates: 20.67°N 78.48°E
- Country: India
- State: Maharashtra
- District: Wardha
- Elevation: 262 m (860 ft)

Population (2001)
  - Total: 15,878

Languages
  - Official: Marathi
- Time zone: UTC+5:30 (IST)
- Postal code: 442101
- ISO 3166 code: IN-MH
- Website: maharashtra.gov.in

Deoli is a small town and a municipal council in Wardha district in the state of Maharashtra, India.

== Geography ==
Deoli is located at 20.67°N 78.48°E. It has an average elevation of 262 metres (859 feet).

== Demographics ==
As of 2011 India census, Deoli had a population of 19,288. Males constitute 51% of the population and females 49%. And 2011 Census Population 19288 Deoli has an average literacy rate of 72%, higher than the national average of 59.5%: male literacy is 78% and, female literacy is 65%. In Deoli, 12% of the population is under 6 years of age.

Year	Male	Female	Total Population	Change	Religion (%)							
Year	Male	Female	Total Population	Change	Hindu	Muslim	Christian	Sikhs	Buddhist	Jain	Other religions and persuasions	Religion not stated
2001	8151	7727	15878	-	87.530	3.873	0.132	0.120	7.652	0.661	0.000	0.031
2011	9996	9292	19288	21.476	86.453	4.127	0.124	0.052	8.492	0.643	0.083	0.026
