= Bor Dam =

- Location within Maharashtra
- Official name: Bor Dam D01225
- Location: Bori
- Coordinates: 20.9729808°N 78.6991882°E
- Opening date: 1965
- Owners: Government of Maharashtra, India

Dam and spillways
- Type of dam: Earthfill
- Impounds: Bor river
- Height: 36.28 m (119.0 ft)
- Length: 1,158 m (3,799 ft)
- Dam volume: 0.002474 km^{3} (0.000594 cu mi)

Reservoir
- Total capacity: 0.127420 km^{3} (0.030570 cu mi)
- Surface area: 13.506 km^{2} (5.215 sq mi)

Bor Dam, is an earthfill dam on Bor river near Bori in the Bor Wildlife Sanctuary, Seloo Tahsil, Wardha district in State of Maharashtra in India.

== Specifications ==
The height of the dam above lowest foundation is 36.28 m (119.0 ft) while the length is 1,158 m (3,799 ft). The volume content is 0.002474 km^{3} (0.000594 cu mi) and gross storage capacity is 0.0138750 km^{3} (0.0033288 cu mi).

== Purpose ==
- Irrigation

== See also ==
- Dams in Maharashtra
- List of reservoirs and dams in India
