= Forest division =

Forest administration in India

A forest division is a term used to signify an area containing one or more (usually) demarcated and (usually) protected or resource-managed forests, for administrative purposes. The term was in use in British India, and hence India, Pakistan and Bangladesh use this term for administrative purposes.

== In India ==
In India, the combined forests in a forest circle are completely divided into non-overlapping forest divisions for the purpose of administration and coordination, in an analogous form of dividing the political area of a district into subdivisions. Alignment of the divisions to political boundaries are not necessary, as forests often overlap political boundaries - but one division cannot span more than one state. It generally comprises one or more districts.

A forest division is broken up into one or more forest ranges.

Each division controls the protected areas and managed resources under its jurisdiction, and is presided over by a Deputy Conservator of Forests, appointed from the Indian Forest Service.
