= Wardha =

Wardha Vardhā
- City
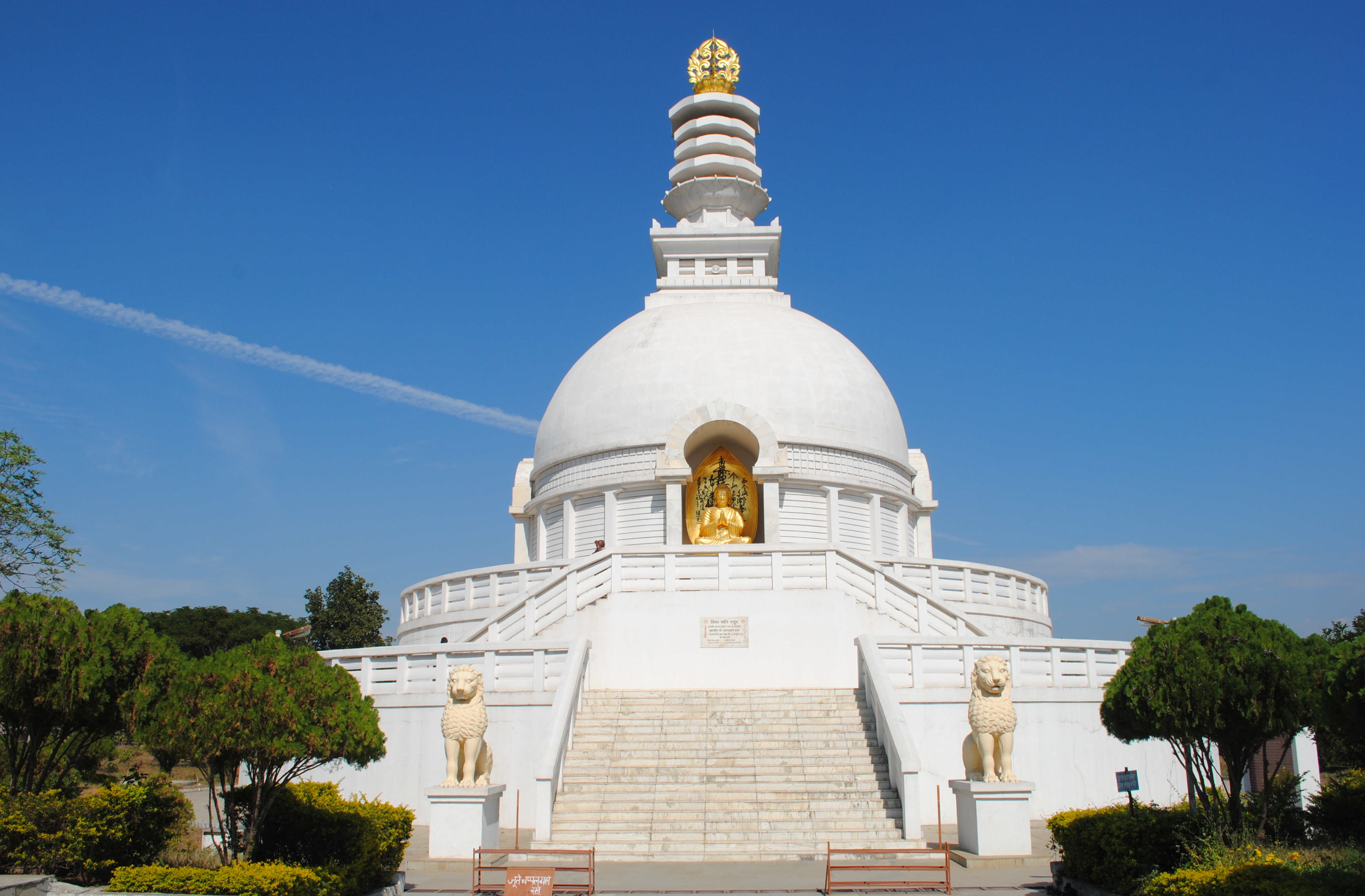
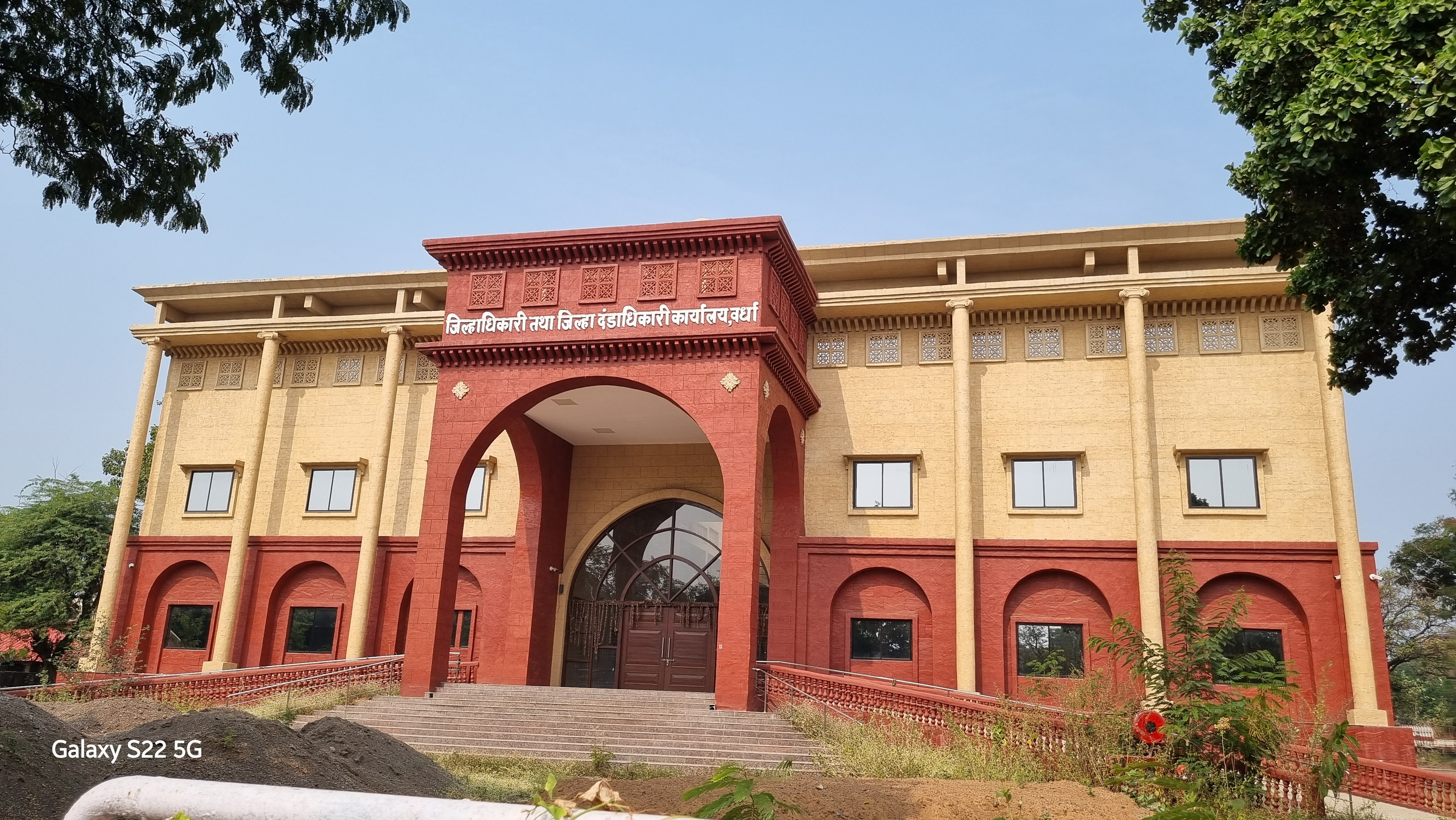
- Vishwashanti Stoop, Collector office
- Wardha in Maharashtra
- Coordinates: 20°44′30″N 78°36′20″E
- Country: India
- State: Maharashtra
- District: Wardha
- Established: 1866

Area
  - Total: 75 km^{2} (29 sq mi)
  - Rank: East Vidarbha: 3rd
- Elevation: 234 m (768 ft)

Population (2011)
  - Total: 106,444
  - Rank: East Vidarbha: 3^{rd}
  - Density: 1,400/km^{2} (3,700/sq mi)

Languages
  - Official: Marathi
- Time zone: UTC+5:30 (IST)
- Vehicle registration: MH-32
- Website: www.wardha.nic.in

Wardha (Note: ISO: Vardhā) is a city and a municipal council in Wardha district in the Indian state of Maharashtra. The administrative headquarter of Wardha district is situated here. Wardha gets its name from the Wardha River which flows on the northern, western and southern boundaries of the district. Founded in 1866, the town is now an important centre for cotton trade.

== History ==
Wardha was included in the empire of the Mauryas, Shungas, Satavahanas, and Vakatakas. Pravarapura, modern Pavnar, was once the capital of the Vakataka dynasty. The Vakatakas were contemporaries of the Imperial Guptas. Prabhavatigupta, the daughter of Chandragupta II (Vikramaditya), was married to the Vakataka ruler Rudrasena. The period of the Vakatakas was from the 2nd to the 5th century CE. The empire stretched from the Arabian Sea in the west to the Bay of Bengal in the east, and from the Narmada River in the north to the Krishna-Godavari delta in the south.

Later on, Wardha was ruled by the Chalukyas, Rashtrakutas, Yadavas, the Delhi Sultanate, the Bahamani Sultanate, the Muslim ruler of Berar, the Gonds and Marathas. Raja Bakht Buland Shah of the Gond Dynasty, and Raghuji of Bhonsale were the prominent rulers in the Medieval period.

During the 1850s Wardha district, (then a part of Nagpur district) fell into the hands of the British who included Wardha in the Central Province. In 1862, it was separated for convenient administrative purposes, and Kawatha near Pulgaon became the district headquarters. In 1866, the district headquarters was moved to Palakwadi village. The huts in the village were destroyed and a new city was constructed by English town-planner Sir Bachelor and Sir Reginald Craddock. This new city was named Wardha after the river Wardha which flows through the district.

Wardha has an adjacent city, Sevagram, and both were major centers for the Indian Independence Movement, especially as the location for an annual meeting of the Indian National Congress in 1934, and Mahatma Gandhi's Ashram.

Wardha was one of the pre-planned cities of British India. The town-planners were Sir Reginald Craddock and Sir Bachelor. In Craddock's memory, his name was given to the district's biggest school and an important road was named after Sir Bachelor in the British period. The Craddock School was renamed Mahatma Gandhi School. The District Hospital was named King George Hospital, but was renamed later on. The stone in which the old name was carved was at the main gate for more than a century. It was hidden by a new name board reading District Hospital. There are many buildings from the British period in the city, including the Z.P. old building, the Central Jail, the Church at Bajajwadi, and the Christian cemetery. The owners of Powale group and Dhandre group come from Wardha.

== Geography and climate ==
Wardha is located at 20.75°N 78.60°E. It has an average elevation of 234 m (768 ft).

Climate data for Wardha (1991–2020, extremes 1966–2012)
Month	Jan	Feb	Mar	Apr	May	Jun	Jul	Aug	Sep	Oct	Nov	Dec	Year
Record high °C (°F)	35.0 (95.0)	41.8 (107.2)	43.9 (111.0)	46.4 (115.5)	48.4 (119.1)	47.9 (118.2)	41.4 (106.5)	39.7 (103.5)	37.9 (100.2)	38.7 (101.7)	36.4 (97.5)	34.1 (93.4)	48.4 (119.1)
Mean daily maximum °C (°F)	29.2 (84.6)	32.3 (90.1)	37.0 (98.6)	41.2 (106.2)	43.2 (109.8)	37.9 (100.2)	32.1 (89.8)	30.8 (87.4)	32.3 (90.1)	32.7 (90.9)	30.7 (87.3)	29.5 (85.1)	33.9 (93.0)
Mean daily minimum °C (°F)	13.1 (55.6)	15.6 (60.1)	19.6 (67.3)	24.2 (75.6)	27.2 (81.0)	25.2 (77.4)	23.2 (73.8)	22.7 (72.9)	22.5 (72.5)	20.6 (69.1)	16.6 (61.9)	13.8 (56.8)	20.2 (68.4)
Record low °C (°F)	6.7 (44.1)	7.4 (45.3)	10.4 (50.7)	15.9 (60.6)	16.9 (62.4)	13.9 (57.0)	14.9 (58.8)	12.9 (55.2)	16.5 (61.7)	10.5 (50.9)	8.5 (47.3)	6.2 (43.2)	6.2 (43.2)
Average rainfall mm (inches)	8.7 (0.34)	7.6 (0.30)	14.8 (0.58)	6.9 (0.27)	7.0 (0.28)	169.0 (6.65)	298.3 (11.74)	236.6 (9.31)	158.3 (6.23)	51.2 (2.02)	9.7 (0.38)	6.9 (0.27)	975.0 (38.39)
Average rainy days	0.6	0.7	1.3	0.7	1.1	8.8	12.9	11.8	7.8	3.0	0.7	0.4	50.1
Average relative humidity (%) (at 17:30 IST)	43	39	34	27	27	52	72	79	72	58	53	47	50
Source: India Meteorological Department

== Demographics ==
Wardha city is governed by a municipal council (category-A). According to the 2011 census, there are about 106,444 citizens within the municipal boundaries. Urbanisation has helped develop neighboring villages including Sindi, Sawangi, Borgaon, Pipri, Mhasala, Nalwadi and Chitoda.

As of the 2011 Indian census, Wardha district had a population of 1,296,157 Males constitute 52% of the population and females 48%. Wardha has an average literacy rate of 80%, higher than the national average of 59.5%: male literacy is 83%, and female literacy is 76%. In Wardha, 11% of the population is under six years of age.

Wardha is the largest city in the Wardha district.

=== Religion ===
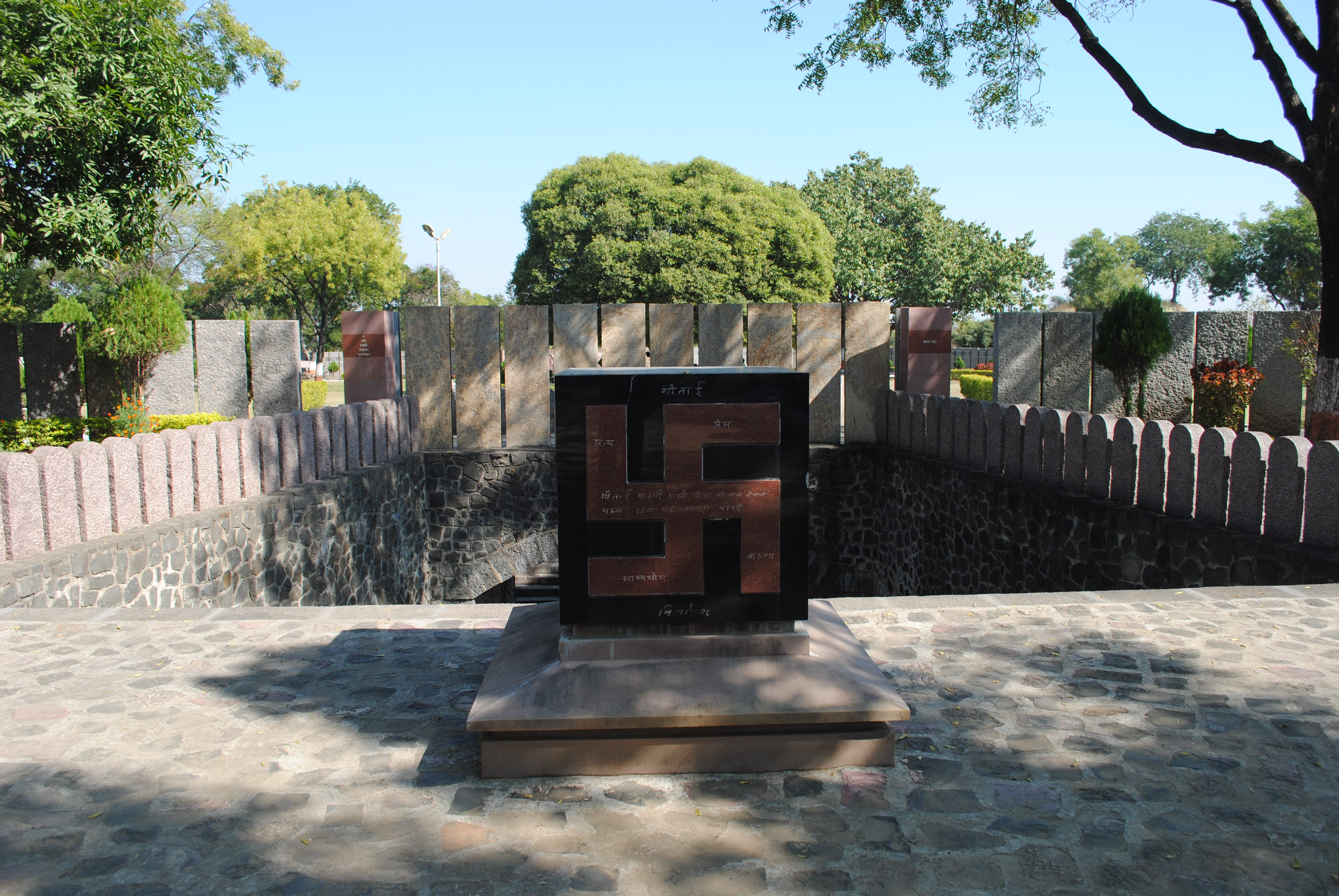
The Gitai Mandir, contains all the verses of the Bhagvad Gita inscribed on granite slabs.

The population of Wardha city constitutes Hindus and Buddhists with a small percentage of Muslims, Christians, Jains and Sikhs. The main spoken language is Marathi and other languages include: Hindi, Marwari, Gujarati, Sindhi and Punjabi.

There are many temples, viharas, gurdwaras, Jain temples, mosques and churches of which Laxminarayan Temple (Bachchhraj Road), Lingi Mandir (Mahadeo Mandir) near Dr. Raosaheb Gade Bhavan, Vitthal Mandir (Hawaldarpura), Ganesh Mandir (Main Road), Gajanan Maharaj Mandir, Sai mandir (M.G. Road), Digambar and Shwetambar Jain temples (Mahadeopura), Shanti Stupa (Gopuri), Gurudwara (Samtanagar) are important. There is a church named St. Thomas Church in Wardha which was built by the British in 1874, and it was a part of the Church of England in India earlier, and later after the Indian Church Act of 1927 was passed it became part of the Church of India, Pakistan, Burma and Ceylon. It is the Anglican church where Sir Bachelor and Sir Reginald Craddock used to worship. It was a civil church, transferred to the Church of North India in 1970. CNI Church in Wardha was the main Presbyterian church before the formation of the Church of North India in 1970. CNI later established Christ Church in Sewagram.

Year	Male	Female	Total Population	Change
2001	57499	53619	111118	-
2011	53697	52747	106444	-4.206

Religion in Wardha City (2011)
Religion	Percent
Hinduism	76.9%
Buddhism	10.82%
Islam	9.77%
Jainism	1.86%
Others	0.66%

=== Culture ===
In 1969, Marathi Sahitya Sammelan, the conference on Marathi Literature, was held in Wardha city. It was presided over by the president of the Conference Purushottam Shivram Rege.

== Transport ==
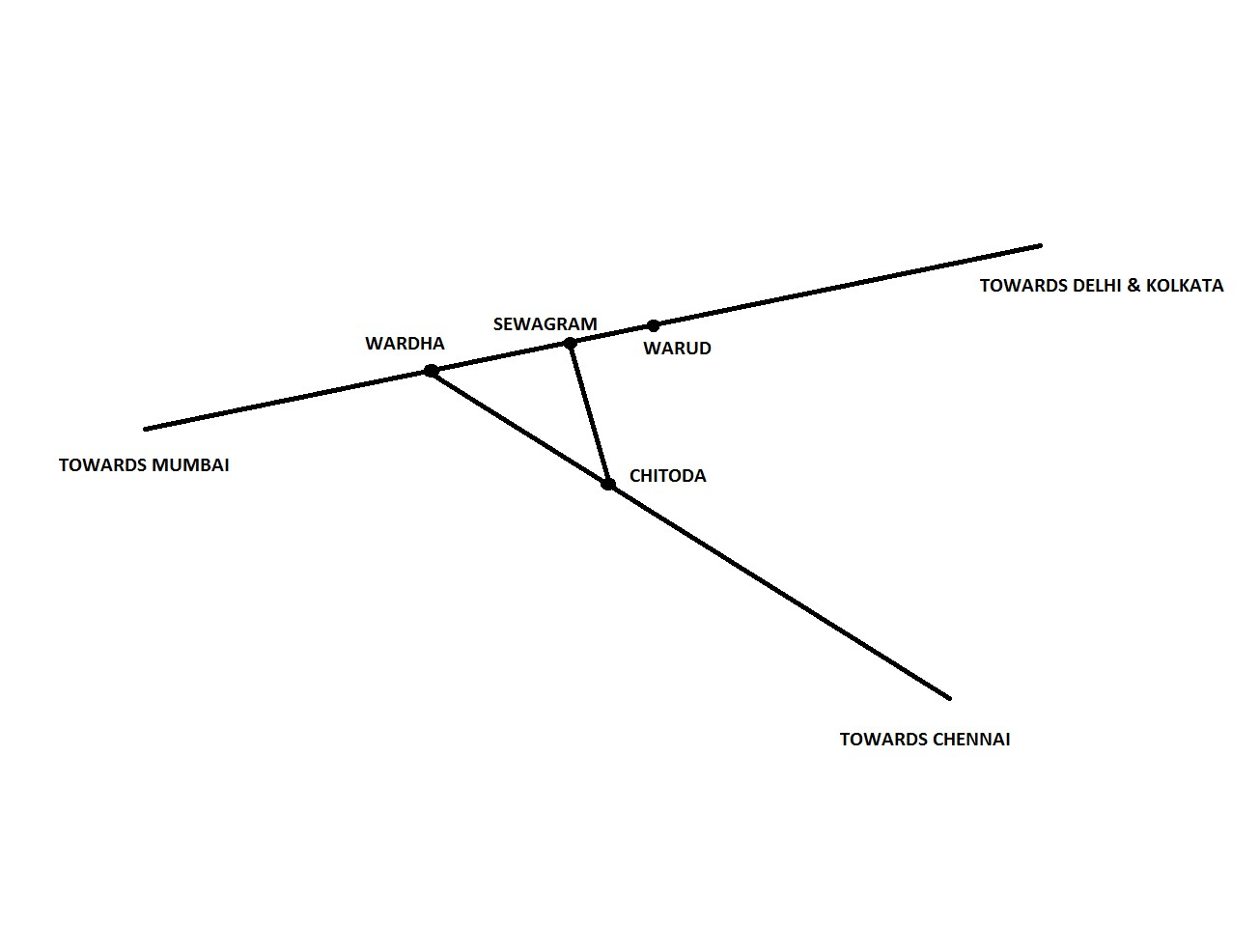
This map shows railway stations in Wardha and its outskirts.

Wardha city is well-connected by roads to the other cities of Maharashtra. National Highway No.361 (Nagpur-Wardha-Yavatmal-Nanded-Latur-Tuljapur) passes through the city. Nagpur-Aurangabad-Mumbai Express Highway also passes through it. Former Chief Minister Devendra Fadnavis' dream project Samruddhi Mahamarg or Nagpur-Mumbai Communication Super Expressway will also pass from the outskirts of the city.

Wardha city is well-connected to most of the parts of India by railways. Wardha railway station is an important rail junction on the Howrah-Nagpur-Mumbai line. The town is also connected to the southern part of the country through Sevagram railway station. Traffic on the Mumbai-Kolkata route is mainly dealt with at Wardha Station, and traffic on the Delhi-Chennai route is dealt with at Sewagram Station (formerly Wardha East station). A new Wardha–Nanded line via Yavatmal, Pusad, and Deoli is being constructed. Both the Delhi-Chennai and the Mumbai-Kolkata railway routes are already carrying heavy traffic and both routes are actually one between Sewagram and Nagpur stations. A new third and fourth line is under construction between Sewagram and Nagpur stations to cater to the heavy traffic.

The Dr. Babasaheb Ambedkar International Airport at Nagpur is the nearest airport with scheduled air services.

== Economy ==
Cotton farming and soybean cultivation in Kharif is quite common. The government has provided canals to irrigate during Rabi season when bengal gram (chickpea) becomes a popular choice to sow.

Many institutions are encouraging farmers to go natural or organic, but the lack of support systems either with the availability of techniques or the marketability of this produce is preventing the spread of this movement.

Wardha is becoming the second industrial hub of the Vidarbha area. This is due to its geographical location and good rail and road connectivity. In the last few decades, many companies and industrial plants were established there. Some of the major industrial plants include steel and powerplant factories.

Wardha IT park of C. Dass group is under construction at the IT park in the city. It is the second in the Vidarbha region after Nagpur. It is located at MIDC area on the Wardha-Sevagram road.

== Education ==
The Mahatma Gandhi Institute of Medical Sciences is the major medical college in the city. Bapurao Deshmukh College of Engineering founded by the trust in the name of freedom fighter Shri Bapurao Deshmukh is the oldest engineering college in the city. The Ramkrishna Bajaj College Of Agriculture is an agriculture college in the city. The Mahatma Gandhi Antarrashtriya Hindi Vishwavidyalaya is an international lingual college in the city. There are many other private as well as government institutions in Wardha. In short, some of the notable institutions in Wardha are given below.

- Bhavan's Lloyds Vidya Niketan
- Mahatma Gandhi Antarrashtriya Hindi Vishwavidyalaya
- Acharya Shrimannarayan Polytechnic
- Alphonsa Senior Secondary School
- Kasturba Vidya Mandir
- Datta Meghe Institute of Medical Sciences
- Govindram Seksaria College of Commerce
- Bajaj Institute of Technology, Wardha
- Agragami High School
- Bajaj College of Science, Wardha (Formerly known as Jankidevi Bajaj College of Science)
- Jawahar Navodaya Vidyalaya, Wardha
- Agnihotri Group Of Institute

== Important places ==
=== Gitai Mandir ===
This temple is in Gopuri near Vishwa Shanti Stupa. It is a unique temple in India as it has no deity or roof. It has only walls made of granite slabs on which 18 chapters of Gitai (Shrimad-bhagwad-gita in Marathi) are inscribed. The walls enclose a little park. The temple was inaugurated by Acharya Vinoba Bhave in 1980. Besides it are two exhibitions about the lives of Acharya Vinoba Bhave and Jamnalal Bajaj.

=== Vishwa Shanti Stupa ===
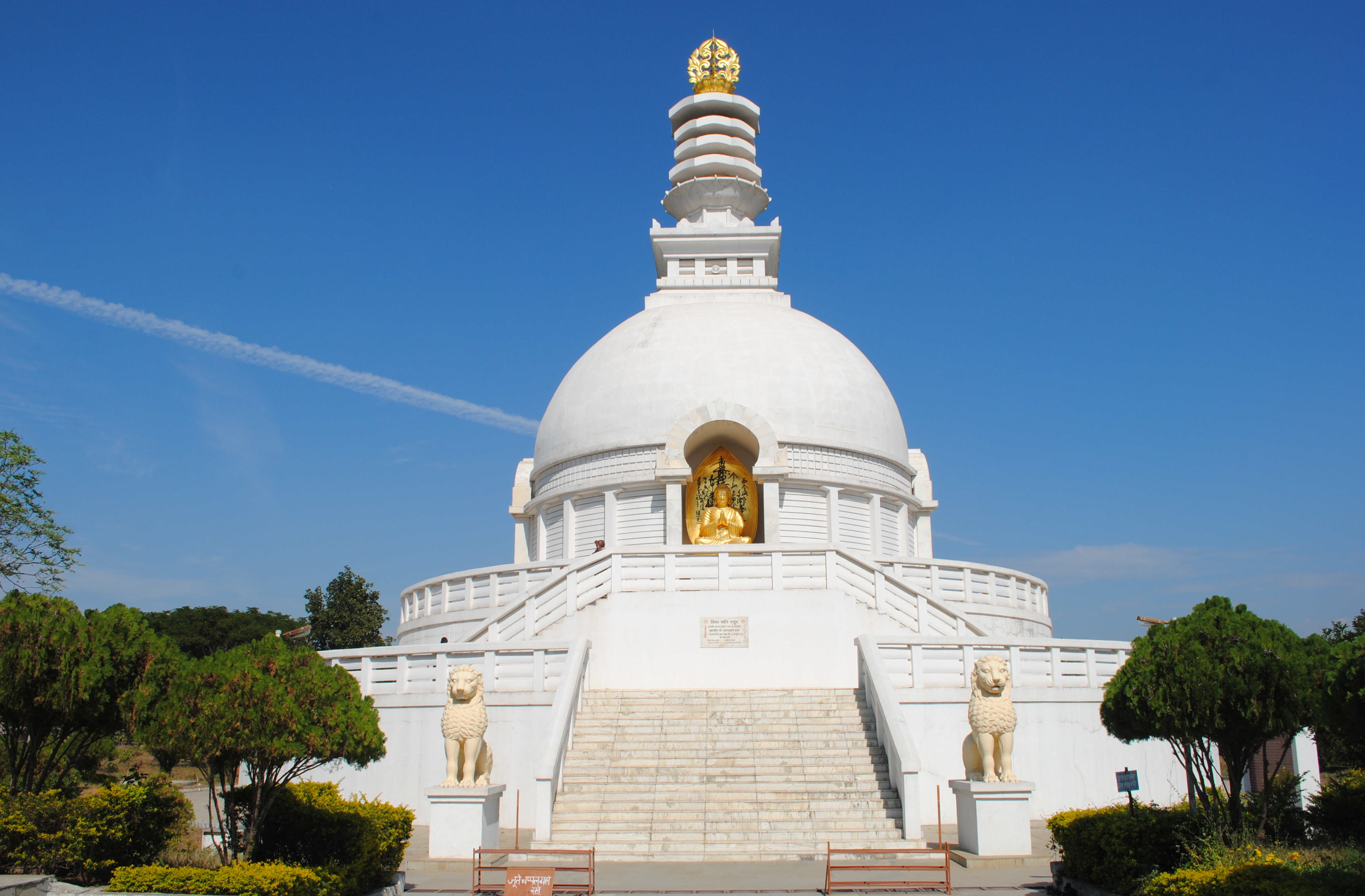
The Vishwa Shanti Stupa in Wardha

Vishwa Shanti Stupa was a dream of Nichidatsu Fujii or Fujii guruji as he was called by Gandhi. It is beside Gitai Mandir. It is a large white stupa. Statues of Buddha are mounted on stupa in four directions. It also has a small Japanese Buddhist temple with a large park. There is a temple near the stupa where prayers are said for universal peace. It is one of many Peace Pagodas that have been built around the world.

=== Magan Sangrahalaya ===
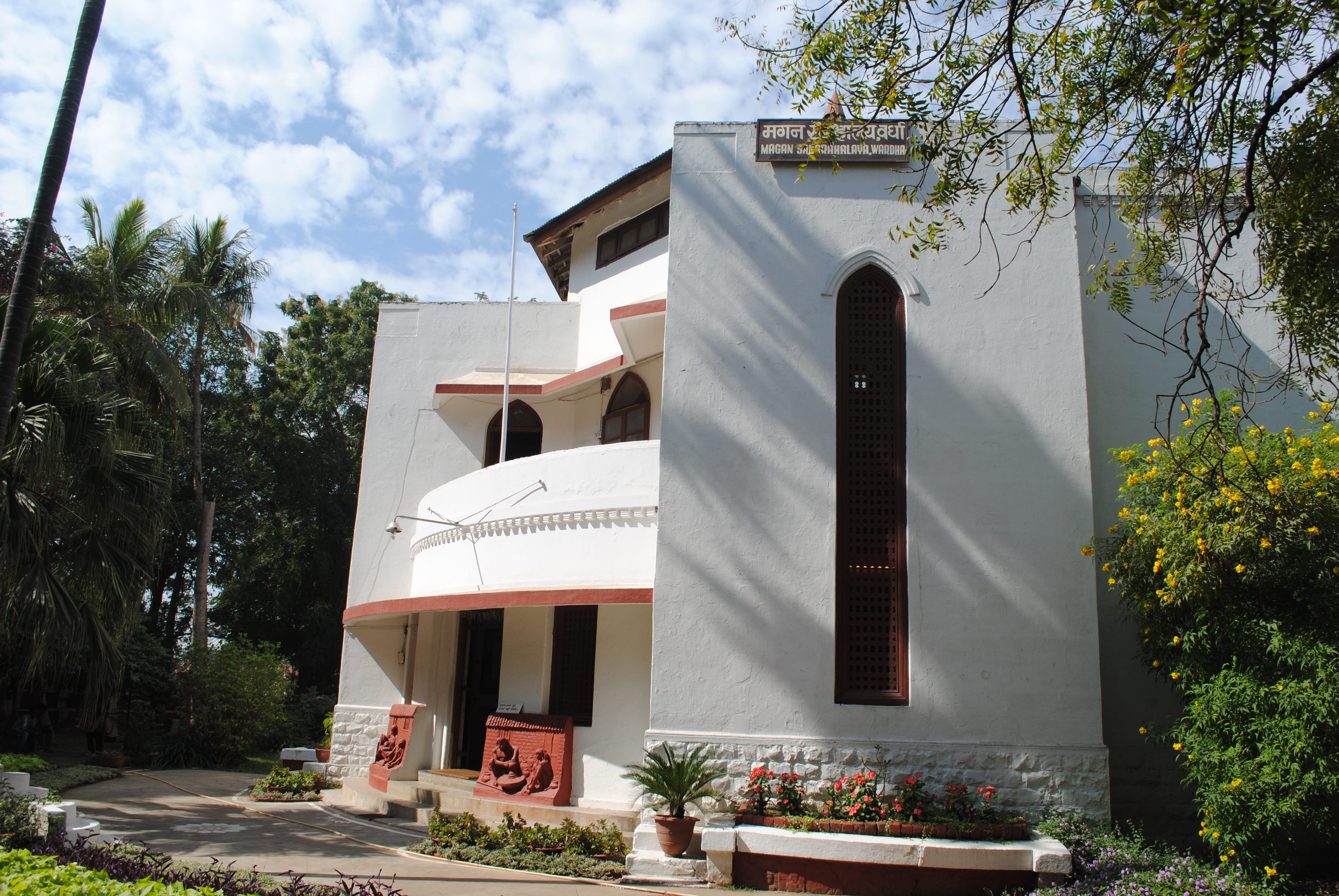
Magan Sangrahalaya, a museum about rural innovations, technologies

This museum was inaugurated by Mahatma Gandhi in 1938. It is in Maganwadi near the village's center of Science. The purpose of the museum is to spread awareness about the research and development of rural industries, agriculture, dairy, various types of charkhas, khadi, handicrafts by rural artisans, methods to promote the Swadeshi movement, magandeep khadi bhandar, sele khadi gramodyog khadi cloth and gramodyog products, and gandhi charkha sample, for example.

=== Sevagram Ashram ===
Sevagram Ashram was the residence of Mahatma Gandhi from 1936 to 1948. After his 1930 Dandi salt march, he decided not to return to his ashram at Sabarmati. After spending two years in jail, he travelled around India and, at the invitation of the Gandhian industrialist Jamnalal Bajaj, stayed for some time in Wardha City at Jamnalal's bungalow. In 1936, at the age of 67, Gandhiji moved to a village (which he subsequently called Sewagram - Hindi for village of service) at the outskirts of Wardha and started to live here in a group of huts with his wife Kasturba and other disciples. This slowly grew into an ashram, where Gandhi lived with his followers for the next twelve years, until his death. The premises are very calming. Many personal items used by Gandhi and his contemporaries are preserved here including his spectacles, telephone, notebook, tables, mats, etc...

=== Paramdham Ashram/ "Brahma Vidya Mandir" ===
This ashram was established by Acharya Vinoba Bhave in 1934 at Pawnar on the bank of the river Dham with a spiritual purpose. He also established Brahma Vidya Mandir ashram within it. He started the Bhoodan Movement. It was also the starting point of Bharat Chhodo Andolan. Pawnar is an ancient city dating back to Mahabharata. During the Bhonsle reign Pawnar was the Vidarbha Kingdom's most important military station. During excavation for the construction of the ashram, many sculptures and idols were found which are kept at the ashram which is open to visitors.

=== Kelzar Ganpati Mandir ===
The Kelzar Ganpati Mandir is about 26 km (16 mi) from Wardha on the Nagpur Road. This temple is on a hill and is surrounded by forests and hills near the Bor National Tiger Reserve and Bird Sanctuary. It is a historical place and its history goes back to Vashishtha Purana.

The place is also mentioned in Mahabharata as Ekchakranagari. According to myth, Pandavas lived here during agyatvas. Bhima killed Bakasura at this place and threw him down this hill. An ancient cave where Bakasura lived is at foot of the hill and his famous well is also nearby. This well has sculptured stones on its inner wall and stairs. Remains of an old fort are also seen here. Finding sculptures during digging for any purpose is common. Sculptures relating to Hinduism, Jainism and Buddhism have been found, the Archaeological Survey of India (ASI) is not paying attention to this. Many sculptures have been ruined due to lack of proper care. Some sculptures can be seen in this temple, on a nearby hillock, the gram panchayat office, the Buddha Vihar.

Dahegaonaa (Gosavi) is 5 km away from Kelzar where Tuljapur railway station connects to Nagpur and Wardha.

=== Shree Sant Kejaji Maharaj Mandir ===
The Shree sant kejaji Maharaj Mandir is about 17 km (11 mi) from Wardha on the Nagpur Road. This temple is surrounded by the Bor river. The Bor National Tiger Reserve and bird sanctuary are 16 km away from the temple.

In the twelfth century, the movement of saints started in Maharashtra. From the twelfth century onwards, Saint Dnyaneshwar started the work of spiritual and social reform through Bhakti Marg. It has been said that Tukaram Maharaj had completed his life till the 16th century. Saint has been pleased. The building was in the fruit. Gyanadeva Rachila found. Raised it .. Janardan Eknath Bhagwat raises the flag. Hymn slower Tuka Hallelsey Summon .. The legacy of this devotion has been undertaken by many saints in Maharashtra. This is the supernatural father-son Sant Kijaji and Sant Namdev Maharaj who came to Vidarbha 183 years ago. Ghorad became a Pandari in Vidarbha town. Kejaji was a spiritual person. He always used to worship Lord Vitthal for his devotion. As Kejaji Maharaj gradually became popular, Raje used to come to see Raghuji Bhosale Maharaj. Hand-made artwork is visible in Shiv Mandir temple

== Notable people ==
- Mahatma Gandhi
- Vinoba Bhave
- Baba Amte
- Sindhutai Sapkal
- Pandurang Sadashiv Khankhoje
- Jamnalal Bajaj
- Sharad Pawar

== See also ==
- Make In Maharashtra
- Wardha Lok Sabha constituency
