= Seloo =

- Town
- Location in Maharashtra, India
- Coordinates: 20°50′6″N 78°42′33″E
- Country: India
- State: Maharashtra
- District: Wardha

Government
  - Type: Nagar Parishad

Population
  - Total: 50,000

Languages
  - Official: Marathi
- Time zone: UTC+5:30 (IST)
- Postal Code: 442104
- Vehicle registration: MH32

Seloo is a tehsil in Wardha subdivision of Wardha district in the Indian state of Maharashtra. Bor Dam is a scenic place near Seloo Town. Bor Dam is just 16 km from Town. In 2011 the Town population was near 50000.

The Town has good Roads and reliable Water supply. It has various Shops as well as Schools, Colleges, Hospitals, Nurseries, Polytechnic College and a Computer Institutes.

The "Seloo Road" Railway Station, which is 6 km from the Town, Railway connect Seloo to all India. Seloo Town is situated on National Highway NH-361.
