= Wardha district =

Coordinates: 20°50′N 78°36′E

- District of Maharashtra
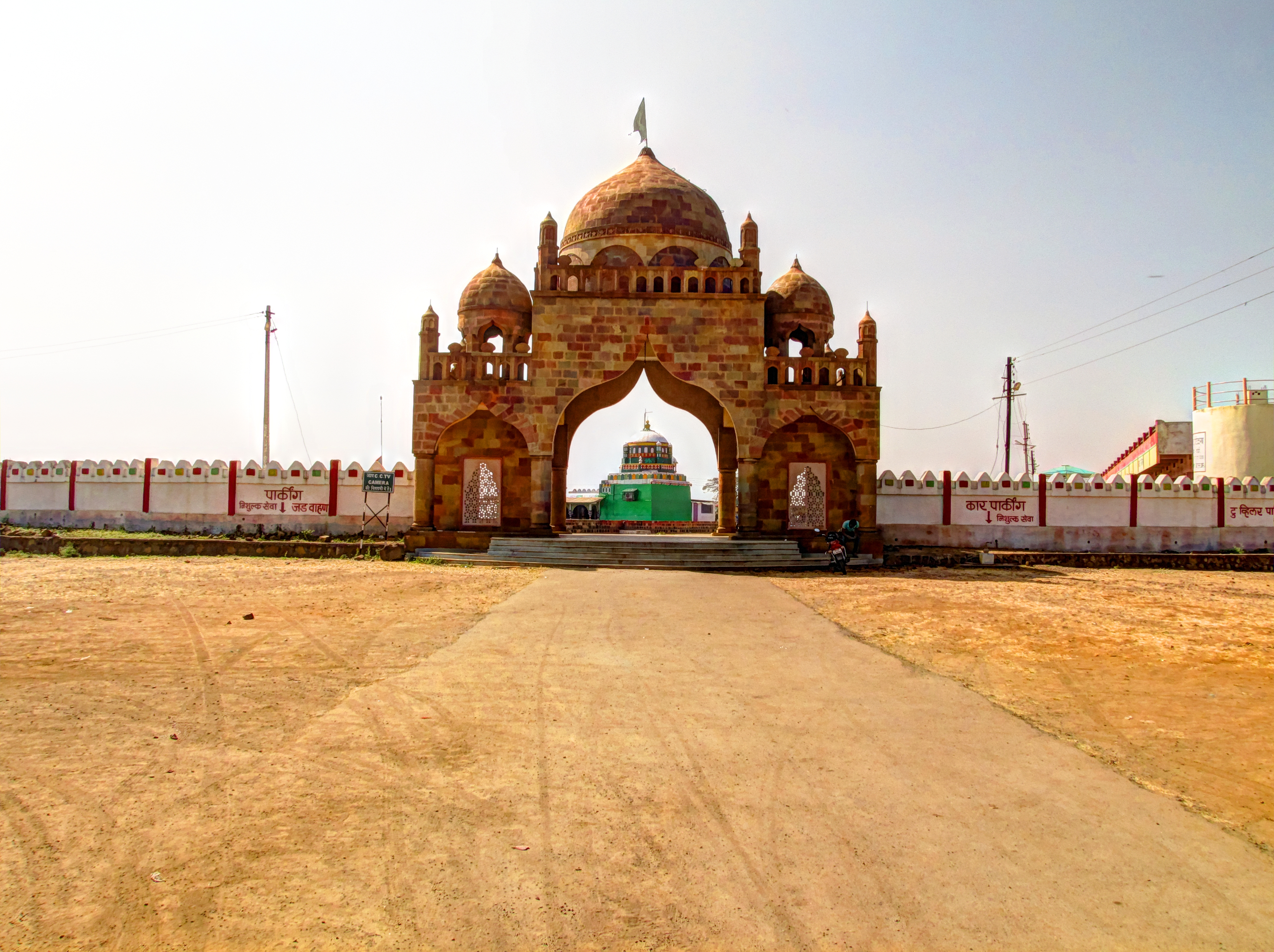
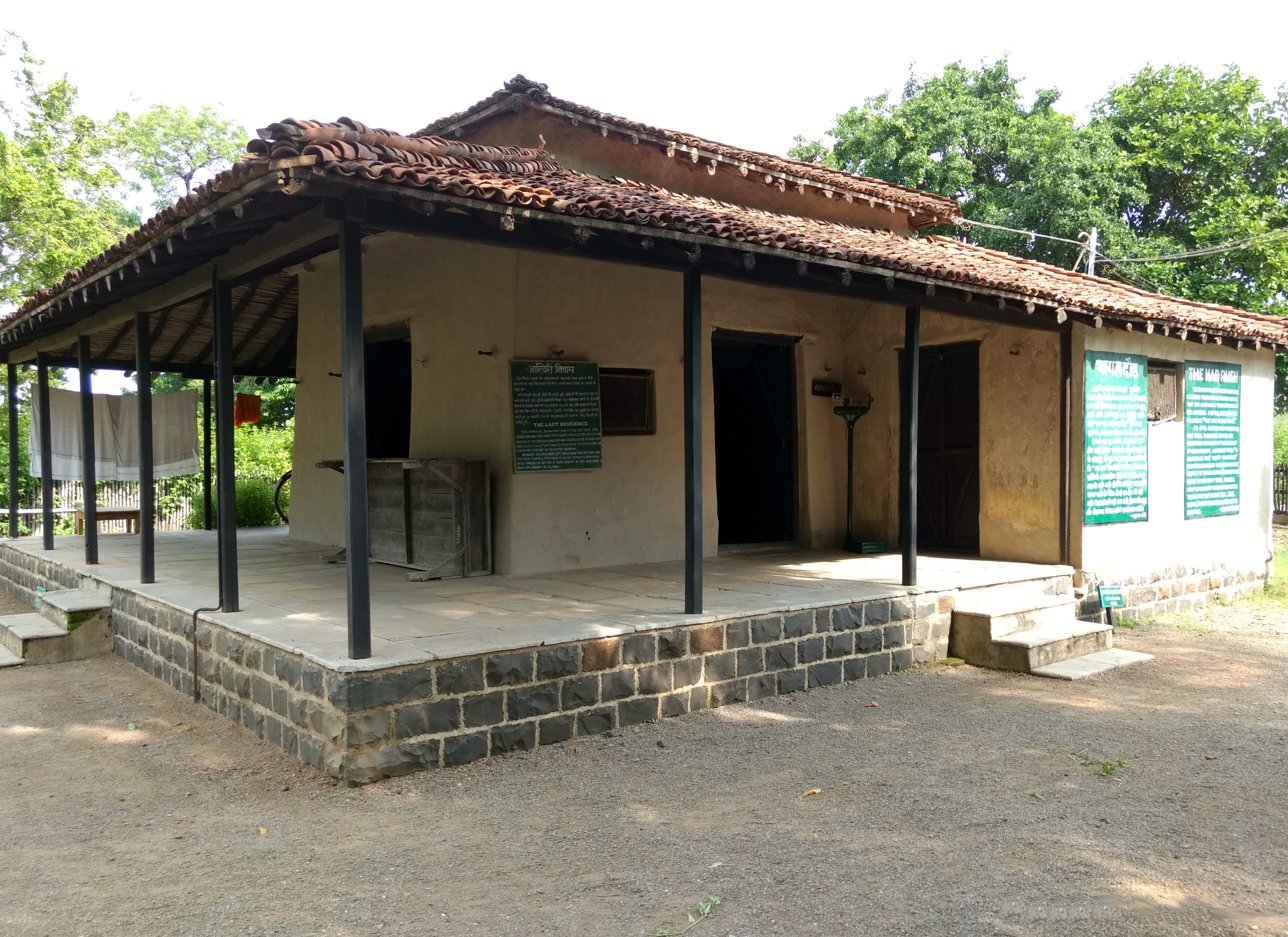
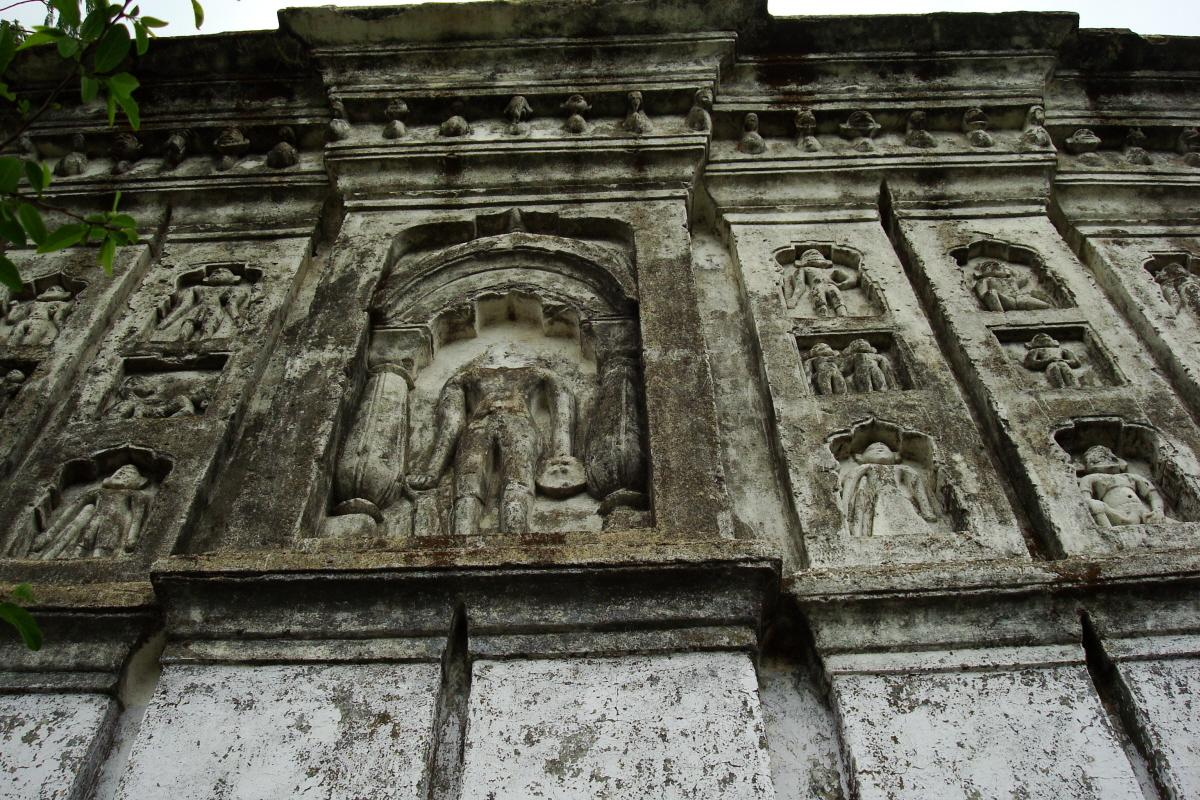
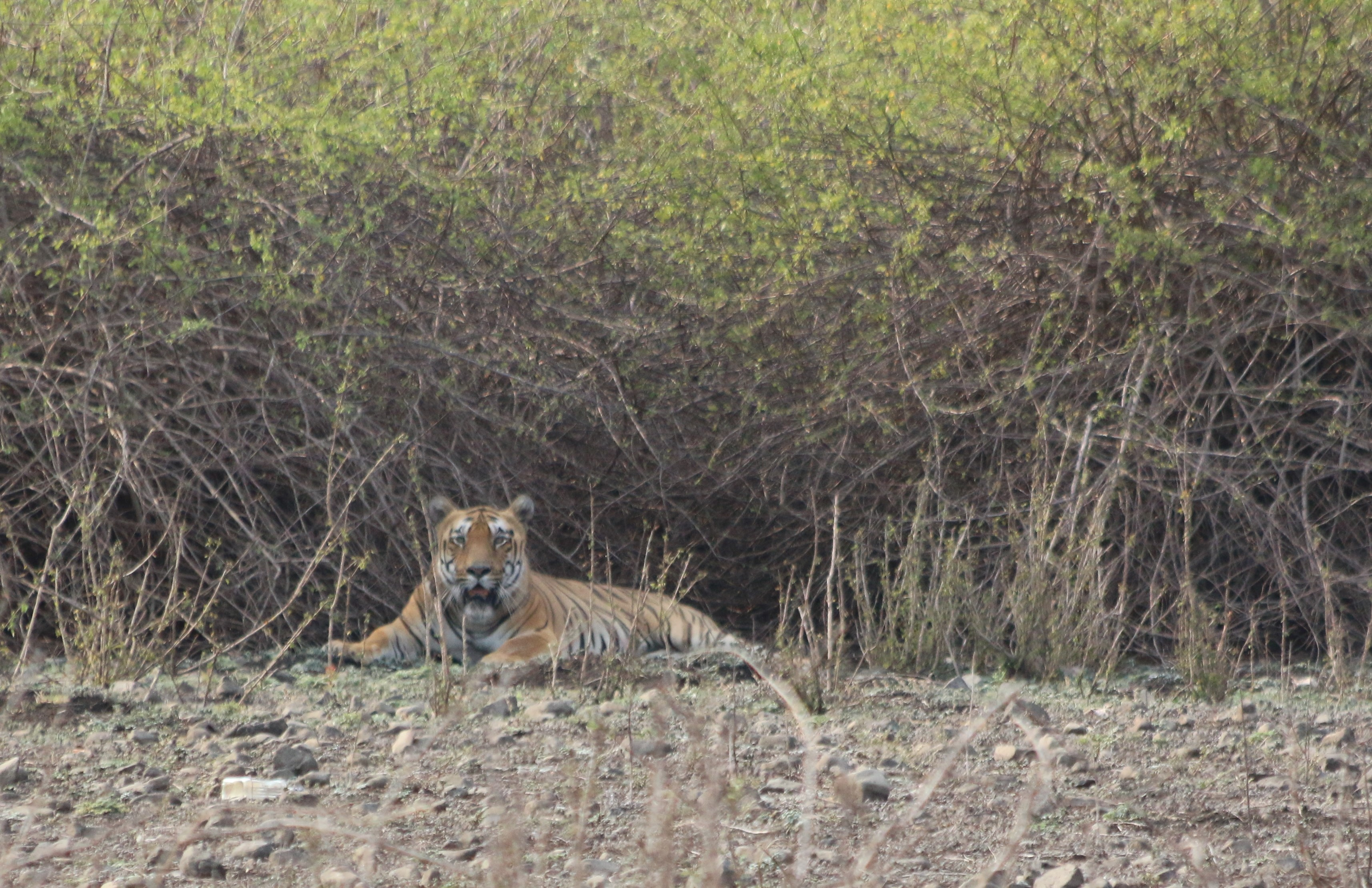
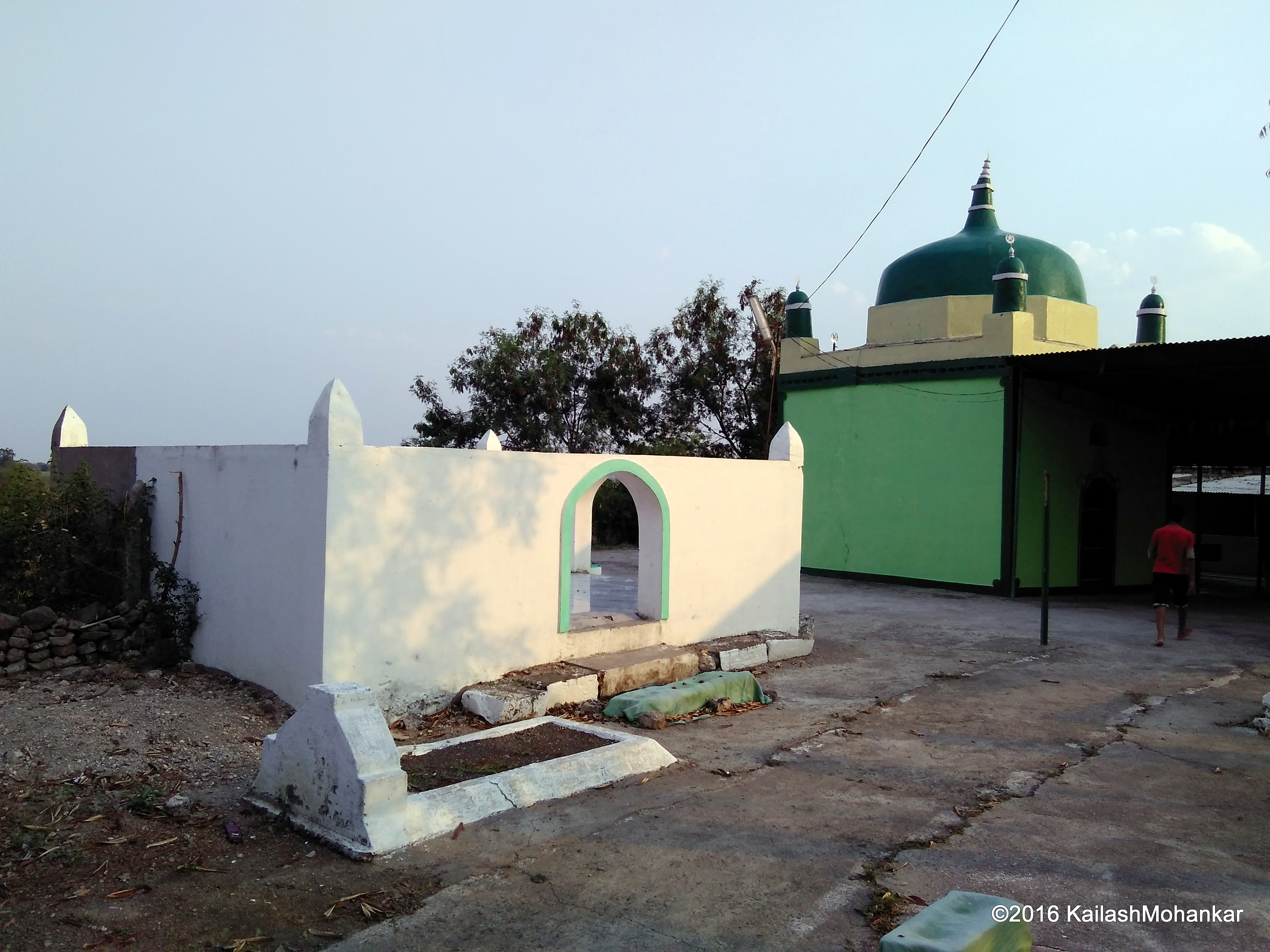
- Clockwise from top-left: Chilla Palace, Hut at Bapu Kuti in Sevagram, Tomb in Paunar Fort, Panchadhara Temple, Tiger in Bor Wildlife Sanctuary

- Location in Maharashtra
- Wardha district
- Country: India
- State: Maharashtra
- Division: Nagpur
- Headquarters: Wardha
- Tehsils: 1. Wardha, 2. Deoli, 3. Seloo, 4. Arvi 5. Ashti 6. Karanja 7. Hinganghat, 8. Samudrapur.

Government
  - Body: Wardha Zilla Parishad
  - Guardian Minister: Pankaj Rajesh Bhoyar; Minister of state
  - President Zilla Parishad: President NA'; Vice-President NA
  - District Collector: Smt. Vanmathi C. (IAS)
  - CEO Zilla Parishad: Jitin Rahman (IAS)
  - MPs: Amar Sharadrao Kale (NCP(SP)) (Wardha)

Area
  - Total: 6,310 km^{2} (2,440 sq mi)

Population (2011)
  - Total: 1,300,774
  - Density: 206/km^{2} (534/sq mi)

Demographics
  - Literacy: 86.99%
  - Sex ratio: 946:1000 (Female:Male)
- Time zone: UTC+05:30 (IST)
- Major highways: NH7(Hinganghat)
- Average annual precipitation: 1062.8 mm
- Website: wardha.gov.in/en/

Wardha district (Marathi pronunciation: [ʋəɾd̪ʰaː]) is in the state of Maharashtra in western India. This district is a part of Nagpur Division. The city of Wardha is the administrative headquarter of the district. Hinganghat, Pulgaon, Arvi and Wardha are the major cities in the District. The District had a population of 1,300,774, of which 26.28% were urban as of 2011.

== Officer ==
=== Members of Parliament ===
- Amar Sharadrao Kale (NCP - Sharad Pawar)
  (Wardha)

=== Guardian Minister ===
Guardian Minister Wardha
- Emblem of India
- Incumbent; Pankaj Rajesh Bhoyar; Minister of state since 18 January 2025
- Style: The Honourable
- Residence: Wardha
- Appointer: Chief Minister of Maharashtra
- Term length: 5 years / No time limit
- Website: wardha.gov.in/en/

==== list of Guardian Minister ====
Name	Term of office
Sachin Ahir; Cabinet Minister	11 November 2010– 26 September 2014
Sudhir Mungantiwar; Cabinet Minister	5 December 2014 - 8 November 2019
Sunil Chhatrapal Kedar; Cabinet Minister	9 January 2020 - 29 June 2022
Devendra Fadnavis; Deputy Chief Minister	24 September 2022- 4 October 2023
Sudhir Mungantiwar; Cabinet Minister	4 October 2023 - 17 January 2025
Pankaj Rajesh Bhoyar; Minister of state	18 January 2025 - Incumbent

=== District Magistrate/Collector ===
District Magistrate / Collector Wardha
- Emblem of India
- Incumbent; Smt. Vanmathi C. (IAS) since December, 2024
- Residence: At Wardha district
- Appointer: Government of Maharashtra
- Term length: No time limit
- Website: wardha.gov.in/en/

==== list of District Magistrate / Collector ====
Name	Term of office
Rahul Kardile (IAS)	March 2021 - December 2024
Smt. Vanmathi C (IAS)	December 2024 - Incumbent

== History ==
The history of the Wardha district dates back to ancient times. It was included in the empires of the Mauryas, Shungas, Satavahanas and Vakatakas. Pravarpur, now modern-day Pavnar, was once the capital of the Vakataka dynasty. Vakatakas were contemporaries of the Imperial Guptas. The daughter of Chandragupta II, Prabhavatigupta, was married to the Vakataka ruler Rudrasena II. The Vakataka Dynasty lasted from the 2nd to the 5th centuries AD. Their state stretched from the Arabian Sea in the west to The Bay of Bengal in the east and from The Narmada River in the north to The Krishna-Godavari Delta in the south.

Later on, Wardha was ruled by the Chalukyas, The Rashtrakutas, The Yadavas, The Delhi Sultanate, The Bahamani Sultanate, The Muslim ruler of Berar, The Gonds and The Marathas. Raja Buland Shah of Gond and Raghuji of Bhonsale were the prominent rulers in the medieval period.

Ashti town in Wardha district was ruled by the Mughals in the guidance of Nawab Muhammad Khan Niazi who was Subedar and Mansabdar in the Mughal empire in the reign of Emperor Akbar he got Ashti as a Jaageer. Nawab Ahmad Khan Niazi was the elder son of Nawab Muhammad Khan Niazi who also served as Mansabdar and Jagirdar in the Mughal court in the reign of Emperor Jahangir he got Ashti as Pergana as his ancestral property. Ahmad Khan Niazi defeated Rahim Khan Dakhni and captured Ellichpur from the Berar empire for the Mughals.

In the 1850s, Wardha, then a part of Nagpur, fell into the hands of the British. They included Wardha in the Central Province. Wardha is a sister city for Sevagram and both were used as major centers for the Indian Independence Movement, especially as headquarters for an annual meet of the Indian National Congress in 1934 and Mahatma Gandhi's Ashram.

The existing Wardha district was a part of Nagpur district till 1862. Further, it was separated for convenient administrative purposes and Kawatha near Pulgaon was the district headquarters. In the year 1866, the district headquarters moved to Palakwadi village which was rebuilt as Wardha city.

Central Ammunition Depot in Pulgaon city of Wardha District is the second-largest ammunition depot in Asia.

== Demographics ==
Historical population
Year	Pop.	±% p.a.
1901	386,012	—
1911	460,775	+1.79%
1921	463,696	+0.06%
1931	516,266	+1.08%
1941	519,330	+0.06%
1951	538,903	+0.37%
1961	634,277	+1.64%
1971	779,562	+2.08%
1981	926,618	+1.74%
1991	1,067,357	+1.42%
2001	1,236,736	+1.48%
2011	1,300,774	+0.51%

Religions in Wardha district (2011)
Religion	Percent
Hinduism	81.27%
Buddhism	13.49%
Islam	4.14%
Jainism	0.44%
Other or not stated	0.66%

According to the 2011 census, Wardha district has a population of 1,300,774, roughly equal to the nation of Mauritius or the US state of New Hampshire. This gives it a ranking of 377th in India (out of a total of 640). The district has a population density of 205 inhabitants per square kilometre (530/sq mi) . Its population growth rate over the decade 2001-2011 was 4.8%. Wardha has a sex ratio of 946 females for every 1000 males, and a literacy rate of 87.22%. 32.54% of the population lives in urban areas. Scheduled Castes and Scheduled Tribes make up 14.52% and 11.49% of the population respectively.

Census year	Total	Male	Female	Change	Religion (%)				
Census year	Total	Male	Female	Change	Hindu	Muslim	Buddhist	Jain	Other
2001	1236736	638990	597746	-	81.362	3.849	13.712	0.484	0.593
2011	1300774	668385	632389	5.178	81.267	4.140	13.486	0.435	0.672

Languages of Wardha district (2011)
1. Marathi (87.8%)
2. Hindi (6.88%)
3. Urdu (1.26%)
4. Others (4.08%)

At the time of the 2011 Census of India, 87.78% of the population in the district spoke Marathi, 6.88% Hindi and 1.26% Urdu as their first language. A form of the Rajasthani-Malvi language, known as Bhoyari/Pawari, was once exclusively spoken by members of the Bhoyar-Pawar caste in the district, but this dialect is now endangered, as only a few people in the community speak it, while most have switched to Marathi or Hindi.

== Politics ==
=== Lok Sabha Seat ===
- Wardha = Amar Kale (NCPSP)

=== Assembly Seats ===
- Wardha = Pankaj Rajesh Bhoyar (BJP)
- Deoli = Rajesh Bakane (BJP)
- Arvi = Sumit Wankhade (BJP)
- Hinganghat = Samir Trambakrao Kunawar (BJP)

== Prominent people ==
- Abdul Shafee, Senior Politician of Indian National Congress
- Baba Amte, India's Social and moral leader (born 26 December 1914) at Hinganghat
- Vinoba Bhave, Freedom fighter and social worker
- Jamnalal Bajaj, Freedom Fighter
- Abhay and Rani Bang, Social Workers, rendering medical services to the poor adiwasi people of Gadchiroli district.
- Sindhutai Sapkal, A Social Activist and Social Worker, working for orphans.

== Geographical indication ==
Waigaon Turmeric was awarded the Geographical Indication (GI) status tag from the Geographical Indications Registry, under the Union Government of India, on 3 June 2016 (valid until 25 March 2034).

Waigaon Halad Utpadak Sangh from Samudrapur, proposed the GI registration of Waigaon Turmeric. After filing the application in March 2014, the Turmeric was granted the GI tag in 2016 by the Geographical Indication Registry in Chennai, making the name "Waigaon Turmeric" exclusive to the Turmeric grown in the region. It thus became the first Turmeric variety from Maharashtra before Sangli Turmeric and the 21st type of goods from Maharashtra to earn the GI tag.
