= Ministry of Food and Drug Administration (Maharashtra) =

Government department of Maharashtra, India

Ministry of Food and Drug Administration, Government of Maharashtra
- Seal of the state of Maharashtra

Ministry overview
- Formed: 1960; 66 years ago
- Jurisdiction: (India) Maharashtra
- Headquarters: Mantralay, Mumbai
- Minister responsible: Narhari Zirwal, Cabinet Minister
- Deputy Minister responsible: Yogesh Kadam, Minister of State
- Ministry executive: Tukaram Mundhe (IAS)
- Parent department: Government of Maharashtra
- Website: fda.maharashtra.gov.in/aboutus.html

The Ministry of Food and Drug Administration is a ministry of the Government of Maharashtra. The ministry is responsible for consumer protection and regulating food and drug related issues in Maharashtra

The Ministry is headed by a cabinet level minister. Narhari Zirwal is current Minister of Food and Drugs Administration.

== History ==
Directorate of Drugs Control was renamed as Food and Drug Administration in 1970. Scope of FDA was increased to cover adulterated food as well as tobacco products. Various circle offices were opened in 1971 at city levels. Expansion took place in 1975 and posts of commissioners as well as joint commissioners were created to grant licenses at divisional levels.

== Structure ==
Ministry controls Food and Drug Administration Department. The department acts as execution wing to take actions. Cabinet level minister is assisted by the minister of state for administration.

=== Authorities ===
Prevention of Food Adulteration Act, 1954 gives powers to various authorities to regulate food and drug related issues.

Commissioner

==== Joint commissioners ====
Several joint commissioners are appointed to oversee

- Food
- Drugs
- Law

===== Divisional joint commissioners =====
- Administrative head for the Division and Licensing Authority for grant of Drugs Manufacturing Licenses (As per Drugs and Cosmetics Act 1940.)

== Head office ==
Minister of Food and Drug Administration मंत्री अन्न व औषध प्रशासन विभाग
- Emblem of India

- Flag of India
- Incumbent; Narhari Zirwal since 21 December 2024
- Ministry of Food and Drug Administration (Maharashtra)
- Style: The Honourable
- Abbreviation: Cabinet Minister
- Member of: State Cabinet
- Reports to: Chief Minister, Maharashtra Legislature
- Seat: Mantralaya, Mumbai
- Appointer: Governor on the advice of the Chief Minister
- Term length: 5 years
- Precursor: Devendra Fadnavis; (2024- 2024)
- Inaugural holder: M. G. Maney; (1960-1962)
- Formation: 1 May 1960
- Deputy: Yogesh Kadam

== Cabinet Ministers ==
No.	Portrait	Minister (Constituency)	Term of office			Political party	Ministry	Chief Minister
No.	Portrait	Minister (Constituency)	From	To	Period	Political party	Ministry	Chief Minister
Minister of Food and Drug Administration
01		Shankarrao Chavan (MLA for Bhokar Constituency No. 85- Nanded District) (Legislative Assembly)	01 May 1960	07 March 1962	1 year, 310 days	Indian National Congress	Yashwantrao I	Yashwantrao Chavan
02		M. G. Mane (MLC for Elected by MLAs Constituency No. 02 - Ahmednagar District) (Legislative Council)	08 March 1962	19 November 1962	256 days	Indian National Congress	Yashwantrao II	Yashwantrao Chavan
03		Marotrao Kannamwar (MLA for Saoli Constituency No. 73- Chandrapur District) (Legislative Assembly) (Chief Minister)	20 November 1962	24 November 1963	1 year, 4 days	Indian National Congress	Kannamwar l	Marotrao Kannamwar
04		P. K. Sawant (MLA for Chiplun Constituency No. 265- Ratnagiri District) (Legislative Assembly) (Interim Chief Minister)	25 November 1962	04 December 1963	9 days	Indian National Congress	Sawant	P. K. Sawant
05		Gopalrao Bajirao Khedkar (MLA for Akot Constituency No. 28- Akola District) (Legislative Assembly)	05 December 1963	01 March 1967	3 years, 86 days	Indian National Congress	Vasantrao I	Vasantrao Naik
06		Vasantrao Naik (MLA for Pusad Constituency No. 81- Yavatmal District) (Legislative Assembly) (Chief Minister)	01 March 1967	27 October 1969	2 years, 240 days	Indian National Congress	Vasantrao II	Vasantrao Naik
07		P. K. Sawant (MLA for Chiplun Constituency No. 265- Ratnagiri District) (Legislative Assembly)	27 October 1969	13 March 1972	2 years, 138 days	Indian National Congress	Vasantrao II	Vasantrao Naik
08		Shankarrao Chavan (MLA for Bhokar Constituency No. 85- Nanded District) (Legislative Assembly)	13 March 1972	04 April 1973	1 year, 32 days	Indian National Congress	Vasantrao III	Vasantrao Naik
09		Abdul Rahman Antulay (MLA for Shrivardhan Constituency No. 193- Raigad District) (Legislative Assembly)	04 April 1973	17 Match; 1974	347 days	Indian National Congress	Vasantrao III	Vasantrao Naik
10		Madhukar Dhanaji Chaudhari (MLA for Raver Constituency No. 11- Jalgaon District) (Legislative Assembly)	17 Match; 1974	21 February 1975	341 days	Indian National Congress	Vasantrao III	Vasantrao Naik
11		Ratnappa Kumbhar (MLA for Shirol Constituency No. 280- Kolhapur District (Legislative Assembly)	21 February 1975	16 April 1977	2 years, 54 days	Indian National Congress	Shankarrao I	Shankarrao Chavan
12		K. M. Patil (MLA for Amalner Constituency No. 15- Jalgaon District) (Legislative Assembly)	17 April 1977	07 March 1978	1 year, 324 days	Indian National Congress	Vasantdada I	Vasantdada Patil
13		Prabha Rau (MLA for Pulgaon Constituency No. 41- Wardha District) (Legislative Assembly)	07 March 1978	18 July 1978	133 days	Indian National Congress (Indira)	Vasantdada II	Vasantdada Patil
14		Hashmukhbhai Upadhaya (MLA for Kandivali Constituency No. 161- Mumbai Suburban District) (Legislative Assembly)	18 July 1978	17 February 1980	1 year, 214 days	Janata Party	Pawar I	Sharad Pawar
15		Jawaharlal Darda (MLC for Elected by MLAs Constituency No. 19 - Yavatmal District) (Legislative Council)	09 June 1980	21 January 1982	1 year, 226 days	Indian National Congress	Antulay	Abdul Rahman Antulay
16		V. Subramaniam (MLA for South Mumbai Constituency No. 121- Mumbai City District) (Legislative Assembly)	21 January 1982	02 February 1983	1 year, 12 days	Indian National Congress	Bhosale	Babasaheb Bhosale
17		Lalita Rao (MLA for Trombay Constituency No. 177- Mumbai Suburban District) (Legislative Assembly)	07 February 1983	17 April 1984	1 year, 70 days	Indian National Congress	Vasantdada III	Vasantdada Patil
18		Ramprasad Borade (MLA for Jintur Constituency No. 95- Parbhani District) (Legislative Assembly)	17 April 1984	05 March 1985	322 days	Indian National Congress	Vasantdada III	Vasantdada Patil
19		Surupsingh Hirya Naik (MLA for Navapur Constituency No. 04- Nandurbar District) (Legislative Assembly)	12 March 1985	03 June 1985	83 days	Indian National Congress	Vasantdada IV	Vasantdada Patil
20		Shivajirao Deshmukh (MLC for Elected by MLAs Constituency No. 18 - Sangli District) (Legislative Council)	03 June 1985	12 March 1986	282 days	Indian National Congress	Nilangekar	Shivajirao Patil Nilangekar
21		V. Subramanian (MLA for South Mumbai Constituency No. 121- Mumbai City District) (Legislative Assembly)	12 March 1986	26 June 1988	2 years, 106 days	Indian National Congress	Shankarrao II	Shankarrao Chavan
22		Prabha Rau (MLA for Pulgaon Constituency No. 41- Wardha District) (Legislative Assembly)	26 June 1988	03 March 1990	1 year, 250 days	Indian National Congress	Pawar II	Sharad Pawar
23		Javed Iqbal Khan (MLA for Trombay Constituency No. 177- Mumbai Suburban District) (Legislative Assembly)	03 March 1990	25 June 1991	1 year, 114 days	Indian National Congress	Pawar III	Sharad Pawar
24		Ramrao Adik (MLC for Elected by MLAs Constituency No. 05 - Ahmednagar District) (Legislative Council)	25 June 1991	22 February 1993	1 year, 242 days	Indian National Congress	Sudhakarrao	Sudhakarrao Naik
25		Arun Gujarathi (MLA for Chopda Constituency No. 10- Jalgaon District (Legislative Assembly)	06 March 1993	14 March 1995	2 years, 8 days	Indian National Congress	Pawar IV	Sharad Pawar
26		Diwakar Raote (MLC for Elected by MLAs Constituency No. 20 - Mumbai City District) (Legislative Council)	14 March 1995	01 February 1999	3 years, 324 days	Shiv Sena	Joshi	Manohar Joshi
27		Narayan Rane (MLA for Malvan Constituency No. 269- Sindhudurg District) (Legislative Assembly) (Chief Minister)	01 February 1999	11 May 1999	99 days	Shiv Sena	Rane	Narayan Rane
28		Pramod Navalkar (MLC for Mumbai Graduates Constituency No. 06 - Mumbai City District) (Legislative Council)	11 May 1999	17 October 1999	159 days	Shiv Sena	Rane	Narayan Rane
29		Chhagan Bhujbal (MLC for Elected by MLAs Constituency No. 09 - Mumbai City District) (Legislative Council) (Deputy Chief Minister)	19 October 1999	27 October 1999	8 days	Nationalist Congress Party	Deshmukh I	Vilasrao Deshmukh
30		Datta Meghe (MLC for Elected by MLAs Constituency No. 15 - Wardha District) (Legislative Council)	27 October 1999	16 January 2003	3 years, 81 days	Nationalist Congress Party	Deshmukh I	Vilasrao Deshmukh
31		Vasant Chavan (MLC for Governor Nominated Constituency No. 11 - Pune District) (Legislative Council)	18 January 2003	01 November 2004	1 year, 295 days	Indian National Congress	Sushilkumar	Sushilkumar Shinde
32		R. R. Patil (MLA for Tasgaon-Kavathe Mahankal Constituency No. 287- Sangli District) (Legislative Assembly) (Deputy Chief Minister)	01 November 2004	09 November 2004	8 days	Nationalist Congress Party	Deshmukh II	Vilasrao Deshmukh
33		Manohar Naik (MLA for Pusad Constituency No. 81- Yavatmal District) (Legislative Assembly)	09 November 2004	01 December 2008	4 years, 22 days	Nationalist Congress Party	Deshmukh II	Vilasrao Deshmukh
34		Manohar Naik (MLA for Pusad Constituency No. 81- Yavatmal District) (Legislative Assembly)	08 December 2008	06 November 2009	333 days	Nationalist Congress Party	Ashok I	Ashok Chavan
35		Manohar Naik (MLA for Pusad Constituency No. 81- Yavatmal District) (Legislative Assembly)	07 November 2009	10 November 2010	1 year, 3 days	Nationalist Congress Party	Ashok II	Ashok Chavan
36		Radhakrishna Vikhe Patil (MLA for Shirdi Constituency No. 218- Ahmednagar District) (Legislative Assembly)	11 November 2010	26 September 2014	3 years, 319 days	Indian National Congress	Prithviraj	Prithviraj Chavan
37		Devendra Fadnavis (MLA for Nagpur South West Constituency No. 52- Nagpur District) (Legislative Assembly) (Chief Minister)	31 October 2014	04 December 2014	34 days	Bharatiya Janata Party	Fadnavis I	Devendra Fadnavis
38		Girish Bapat (MLA for Kasba Peth Constituency No. 215- Pune District (Legislative Assembly)	05 December 2014	04 June 2019	4 years, 181 days	Bharatiya Janata Party	Fadnavis I	Devendra Fadnavis
39		Devendra Fadnavis (MLA for Nagpur South West Constituency No. 52- Nagpur District) (Legislative Assembly) (Chief_Minister); Additional Charge	04 June 2019	16 June 2019	12 days	Bharatiya Janata Party	Fadnavis I	Devendra Fadnavis
40		Jayakumar Jitendrasinh Rawal (MLA for Sindkheda Constituency No. 06- Dhule District) (Legislative Assembly)	16 June 2019	12 November 2019	149 days	Bharatiya Janata Party	Fadnavis I	Devendra Fadnavis
41		Devendra Fadnavis (MLA for Nagpur South West Constituency No. 52- Nagpur District) (Legislative Assembly) (Chief_Minister); In Charge	23 November 2019	28 November 2019	5 days	Bharatiya Janata Party	Fadnavis II	Devendra Fadnavis
42		Chhagan Bhujbal (MLA for Yevla Constituency No. 119- Nashik District) (Legislative Assembly)	28 November 2019	30 December 2019	32 days	Nationalist Congress Party	Thackeray	Uddhav Thackeray
43		Rajendra Shingne (MLA for Sindkhed Raja Constituency No. 24- Buldhana District (Legislative Assembly)	30 December 2019	29 June 2022	2 years, 181 days	Nationalist Congress Party	Thackeray	Uddhav Thackeray
44		Eknath Shinde (MLA for Kopri-Pachpakhadi Constituency No. 147- Thane District) (Legislative Assembly) (Chief Minister); In Charge	30 June 2022	14 August 2022	45 days	Shiv Sena (2022–present)	Eknath	Eknath Shinde
45		Sanjay Rathod (MLA for Digras Constituency No. 79- Yavatmal District (Legislative Assembly)	14 August 2022	14 July 2023	334 days	Shiv Sena (2022–present)	Eknath	Eknath Shinde
46		Dharamraobaba Bhagwantrao Aatram (MLA for Aheri Constituency No. 69- Gadchiroli District (Legislative Assembly)	14 July 2023	26 November 2024	1 year, 135 days	Nationalist Congress Party	Eknath	Eknath Shinde
47		Devendra Fadnavis (MLA for Nagpur South West Constituency No. 52- Nagpur District) (Legislative Assembly) (Chief_Minister); In Charge	05 December 2024	21 December 2024	16 days	Bharatiya Janata Party	Fadnavis III	Devendra Fadnavis
48		Narhari Zirwal (MLA for Dindori Constituency No. 122- Nashik District (Legislative Assembly)	21 December 2024	Incumbent	1 year, 261 days	Nationalist Congress Party	Fadnavis III	Devendra Fadnavis

== Ministers of State ==
No.	Portrait	Deputy Minister (Constituency)	Term of office			Political party	Ministry	Minister	Chief Minister
No.	Portrait	Deputy Minister (Constituency)	From	To	Period	Political party	Ministry	Minister	Chief Minister
Deputy Minister of Food and Drug Administration
Vacant			23 November 2019	28 November 2019	5 days	NA	Fadnavis II	Devendra Fadnavis	Devendra Fadnavis
01		Rajendra Patil Yadravkar (MLA for Shirol Constituency No. 280- Kolhapur District) (Legislative Assembly)	30 December 2019	27 June 2022	2 years, 179 days	Shiv Sena	Thackeray	Rajendra Shingne	Uddhav Thackeray
02		Satej Patil (MLC for Elected by Kolhapur Local Authorities Constituency No. 06 - Kolhapur District) (Legislative Council); Additional_Charge	27 June 2022	29 June 2022	2 days	Indian National Congress	Thackeray	Rajendra Shingne	Uddhav Thackeray
Vacant			30 June 2022	26 November 2024	2 years, 149 days	NA	Eknath	Eknath Shinde (2022 - 2022); Sanjay Rathod (2022 - 2023); Dharamraobaba Bhagwantrao Aatram (2023 – 2024)	Eknath Shinde
03		Yogesh Kadam (MLA for Dapoli Constituency No. 263- Ratnagiri District) (Legislative Assembly)	21 December 2024	Incumbent	1 year, 261 days	Shiv Sena (Shinde Group)	Fadnavis III	Narhari Zirwal (2024–Present)	Devendra Fadnavis
