= Ministry of Special Assistance (Maharashtra) =

Indian government ministry responsible for affirmative action

Ministry of Special Assistance, Government of Maharashtra
- मंत्रालय विशेष सहाय्य विभाग महाराष्ट्र शासन
- Seal of the state of Maharashtra

- Building of Administrative Headquarters of Mumbai

Ministry overview
- Formed: 1928
- Jurisdiction: (India) Maharashtra
- Headquarters: Mantralay, Mumbai
- Minister responsible: Narhari Zirwal, Cabinet Minister
- Deputy Minister responsible: Vacant, TBD since 29 June 2022, Minister of State
- Ministry executive: Shyam Tagare (IAS)
- Parent department: Government of Maharashtra
- Website: sjsa.maharashtra.gov.in/en

The Ministry of Special Assistance is a ministry of the Government of Maharashtra. It is responsible for welfare, social justice and empowerment of disadvantaged and marginalized sections of society.

The Ministry is headed by a cabinet level minister. Narhari Zirwal is current Minister of Special Assistance.

== Head office ==
Minister of Special Assistance विशेष सहाय्य मंत्री
- Emblem of India

- Flag of India
- Incumbent; Narhari Zirwal since 21 December 2024
- Ministry of Special Assistance (Maharashtra)
- Style: The Honourable
- Abbreviation: Cabinet Minister
- Member of: State Cabinet
- Reports to: Chief Minister, Maharashtra Legislature
- Seat: Mantralaya, Mumbai
- Appointer: Governor On The Advice Of The Chief Minister
- Term length: 5 years
- Precursor: Devendra Fadnavis; Chief Minister (2024-2024)
- Inaugural holder: Niramala Raje Bhosale (1960-1962)
- Formation: 1 May 1960
- Deputy: Vacant, TBD; since 29 June 2022

== Cabinet Ministers ==
No.	Portrait	Minister (Constituency)	Term of office			Political party	Ministry	Chief Minister
No.	Portrait	Minister (Constituency)	From	To	Period	Political party	Ministry	Chief Minister
Minister of Special Assistance
01		Balasaheb Shivram Bharde (MLA for Ahmednagar South Constituency No. 224- Ahmednagar District) (Legislative Assembly)	01 May 1960	07 March 1962	1 year, 310 days	Indian National Congress	Yashwantrao I	Yashwantrao Chavan
02		Niramala Raje Bhosale (MLA for Satara Constituency No. 268- Satara District) (Legislative Assembly)	08 March 1962	19 November 1962	256 days	Indian National Congress	Yashwantrao II	Yashwantrao Chavan
03		Madhukar Dhanaji Chaudhari (MLA for Raver Constituency No. 11- Jalgaon District) (Legislative Assembly)	20 November 1962	24 November 1963	1 year, 4 days	Indian National Congress	Kannamwar l	Marotrao Kannamwar
04		P. K. Sawant (MLA for Chiplun Constituency No. 265- Ratnagiri District) (Legislative Assembly) (Interim Chief Minister)	25 November 1962	04 December 1963	9 days	Indian National Congress	Sawant I	P. K. Sawant
05		Narendra Mahipati Tidke (MLA for Savner Constituency No. 49- Nagpur District) (Legislative Assembly)	05 December 1963	01 March 1967	3 years, 86 days	Indian National Congress	Vasantrao I	Vasantrao Naik
06		Pratibha Patil (MLA for Jalgaon City Constituency No. 13- Jalgaon District) (Legislative Assembly)	01 March 1967	09 September 1969	2 years, 192 days	Indian National Congress	Vasantrao II	Vasantrao Naik
07		D. S. Palaspagar (MLC for Elected by MLAs Constituency No. 19 - Bhandara District) (Legislative Council)	09 September 1969	13 March 1972	2 years, 186 days	Indian National Congress	Vasantrao II	Vasantrao Naik
08		M. B. Popat (MLA for Dhobitalao Constituency No. 160- Mumbai City District) (Legislative Assembly)	13 March 1972	04 April 1973	1 year, 32 days	Indian National Congress	Vasantrao III	Vasantrao Naik
09		Narendra Mahipati Tidke (MLA for Savner Constituency No. 49- Nagpur District) (Legislative Assembly)	04 April 1973	17 Match; 1974	347 days	Indian National Congress	Vasantrao III	Vasantrao Naik
10		Vasantdada Patil (MLA for Sangli Constituency No. 282- Sangli District) (Legislative Assembly)	17 Match; 1974	21 February 1975	341 days	Indian National Congress	Vasantrao III	Vasantrao Naik
11		Pratibha Patil (MLA for Jalgaon City Constituency No. 13- Jalgaon District) (Legislative Assembly)	21 February 1975	16 April 1977	2 years, 54 days	Indian National Congress	Shankarrao I	Shankarrao Chavan
12		Yashwantrao Mohite (MLA for Karad South Constituency No. 260- Satara District) (Legislative Assembly)	17 April 1977	07 March 1978	1 year, 324 days	Indian National Congress	Vasantdada I	Vasantdada Patil
13		Prabha Rau (MLA for Pulgaon Constituency No. 41- Wardha District) (Legislative Assembly)	07 March 1978	18 July 1978	133 days	Indian National Congress (Indira)	Vasantdada II	Vasantdada Patil
14		Uttamrao Patil (MLC for Elected by MLAs Constituency No. 19 - Jalgaon District) (Legislative Council)	18 July 1978	17 February 1980	1 year, 214 days	Janata Party	Pawar I	Sharad Pawar
15		Narendra Mahipati Tidke (MLA for Savner Constituency No. 49- Nagpur District) (Legislative Assembly)	09 June 1980	09 March 1981	273 days	Indian National Congress	Antulay	Abdul Rahman Antulay
16		Nanabhau Yembadwar (MLC for Bhandara - Gondia Local Authorities Constituency No. 14 - Gondia District) (Legislative Council)	09 March 1981	21 January 1982	318 days	Indian National Congress	Antulay	Abdul Rahman Antulay
17		Shivajirao Patil Nilangekar (MLA for Nilanga Constituency No. 238- Latur District) (Legislative Assembly)	21 January 1982	02 February 1983	1 year, 12 days	Indian National Congress	Bhosale	Babasaheb Bhosale
18		Narendra Marutrao Kamble (MLC for Elected by Governor Nominated No. 10 - Mumbai City District) (Legislative Council)	07 February 1983	05 March 1985	2 years, 26 days	Indian National Congress	Vasantdada III	Vasantdada Patil
19		Jawaharlal Darda (MLC for Elected by MLAs Constituency No. 19 - Yavatmal District) (Legislative Council)	12 March 1985	03 June 1985	83 days	Indian National Congress	Vasantdada IV	Vasantdada Patil
20		Balachandra Bhai Sawant (MLC for Elected by MLAs Constituency No. 09 - Ratnagiri District) (Legislative Council)	03 June 1985	12 March 1986	282 days	Indian National Congress	Nilangekar	Shivajirao Patil Nilangekar
21		Shankarrao Chavan (MLC for Elected by MLAs Constituency No. 08 - Nanded District) (Legislative Council) (Chief Minister)	12 March 1986	26 June 1988	2 years, 106 days	Indian National Congress	Shankarrao II	Shankarrao Chavan
22		Narendra Marutrao Kamble (MLC for Elected by Governor Nominated No. 10 - Mumbai City District) (Legislative Council)	26 June 1988	03 March 1990	1 year, 250 days	Indian National Congress	Pawar II	Sharad Pawar
23		Javed Iqbal Khan (MLA for Trombay Constituency No. 177- Mumbai Suburban District) (Legislative Assembly)	04 March 1990	25 June 1991	1 year, 113 days	Indian National Congress	Pawar III	
24		Sushilkumar Shinde (MLA for Solapur City Central Constituency No. 249- Solapur District) (Legislative Assembly)	25 June 1991	22 February 1993	1 year, 242 days	Indian National Congress	Sudhakarrao	Sudhakarrao Naik
25		Ramrao Adik (MLC for Elected by MLAs Constituency No. 05 - Ahmednagar District) (Legislative Council)	06 March 1993	14 March 1995	2 years, 8 days	Indian National Congress	Pawar IV	Sharad Pawar
26		Manohar Joshi (MLA for Dadar Constituency No. 181- Mumbai City District) (Legislative Assembly) (Chief Minister)	14 March 1995	19 October 1997	2 years, 219 days	Shiv Sena	Joshi	Manohar Joshi
27		Pramod Navalkar (MLC for Mumbai Graduates Constituency No. 06 - Mumbai City District) (Legislative Council)	19 October 1997	01 February 1999	1 year, 105 days	Shiv Sena	Joshi	Manohar Joshi
28		Sureshdada Jain (MLA for Jalgaon City Constituency No. 13- Jalgaon District (Legislative Assembly)	01 February 1999	11 May 1999	99 days	Shiv Sena	Rane	Narayan Rane
29		Haribhau Bagade (MLA for Aurangabad East Constituency No. 109- Chhatrapati Sambhaji Nagar District Also Previously Known Aurangabad District (Legislative Assembly)	11 May 1999	17 October 1999	159 days	Bharatiya Janata Party	Rane	Narayan Rane
30		Chhagan Bhujbal (MLC for Elected by MLAs Constituency No. 09 - Mumbai City District) (Legislative Council) (Deputy Chief Minister)	19 October 1999	03 May 2001	1 year, 194 days	Nationalist Congress Party	Deshmukh I	Vilasrao Deshmukh
31		Madhukarrao Pichad (MLA for Akole Constituency No. 213- Ahmednagar District (Legislative Assembly)	03 May 2001	16 January 2003	1 year, 257 days	Nationalist Congress Party	Deshmukh I	Vilasrao Deshmukh
32		Vijaysinh Mohite–Patil (MLA for Malshiras Constituency No. 254- Solapur District) (Legislative Assembly)	18 January 2003	23 December 2003	346 days	Nationalist Congress Party	Sushilkumar	Sushilkumar Shinde
33		Vijaysinh Mohite–Patil (MLA for Malshiras Constituency No. 254- Solapur District) (Legislative Assembly) (Deputy Chief Minister)	23 December 2003	01 November 2004	314 days	Nationalist Congress Party	Sushilkumar	Sushilkumar Shinde
32		R. R. Patil (MLA for Tasgaon-Kavathe Mahankal Constituency No. 287- Sangli District) (Legislative Assembly) (Deputy Chief Minister)	01 November 2004	09 November 2004	8 days	Nationalist Congress Party	Deshmukh II	Vilasrao Deshmukh
33		Jayant Patil (MLA for Walva Constituency No. 283- Sangli District) (Legislative Assembly)	09 November 2004	01 December 2008	4 years, 22 days	Nationalist Congress Party	Deshmukh II	Vilasrao Deshmukh
34		Nawab Malik (MLA for Anushakti Nagar Constituency No. 172- Mumbai Suburban District) (Legislative Assembly)	08 December 2008	06 November 2009	333 days	Nationalist Congress Party	Ashok I	Ashok Chavan
35		Chhagan Bhujbal (MLA for Yevla Constituency No. 119- Nashik District) (Legislative Assembly) (Deputy Chief Minister)	07 November 2009	10 November 2010	1 year, 3 days	Nationalist Congress Party	Ashok II	Ashok Chavan
36		Patangrao Kadam (MLA for Palus-Kadegaon Constituency No. 285- Sangli District) (Legislative Assembly)	11 November 2010	26 September 2014	3 years, 319 days	Indian National Congress	Prithviraj	Prithviraj Chavan
37		Vishnu Savara (MLA for Vikramgad Constituency No. 129- Palghar District) (Legislative Assembly)	31 October 2014	05 December 2014	35 days	Bharatiya Janata Party	Fadnavis I	Devendra Fadnavis
38		Rajkumar Badole (MLA for Arjuni-Morgaon Constituency No. 63- Gondiya District) (Legislative Assembly)	05 December 2014	16 June 2019	4 years, 193 days	Bharatiya Janata Party	Fadnavis I	Devendra Fadnavis
39		Suresh Khade (MLA for Miraj) Constituency No. 281- Sangli District (Legislative Assembly)	16 June 2019	12 November 2019	149 days	Bharatiya Janata Party	Fadnavis I	Devendra Fadnavis
40		Devendra Fadnavis (MLA for Nagpur South West Constituency No. 52- Nagpur District) (Legislative Assembly) (Chief Minister) (In Charge)	23 November 2019	28 November 2019	5 days	Bharatiya Janata Party	Fadnavis II	Devendra Fadnavis
41		Chhagan Bhujbal (MLA for Yevla Constituency No. 119- Nashik District) (Legislative Assembly)	28 November 2019	30 December 2019	32 days	Nationalist Congress Party	Thackeray	Uddhav Thackeray
42		Dhananjay Munde (MLA for Parli Constituency No. 233- Beed District) (Legislative Assembly)	30 December 2019	29 June 2022	2 years, 181 days	Nationalist Congress Party	Thackeray	Uddhav Thackeray
43		Eknath Shinde (MLA for Kopri-Pachpakhadi Constituency No. 147- Thane District) (Legislative Assembly) (Chief Minister) (In Charge)	30 June 2022	14 August 2022	45 days	Shiv Sena (2022–present)	Eknath	Eknath Shinde
44		Eknath Shinde (MLA for Kopri-Pachpakhadi Constituency No. 147- Thane District) (Legislative Assembly) (Chief Minister)	14 August 2022	14 July 2023	334 days	Shiv Sena (2022–present)	Eknath	Eknath Shinde
45		Hasan Mushrif (MLA for Kagal Constituency No. 273- Kolhapur District) (Legislative Assembly)	14 July 2023	26 November 2024	1 year, 135 days	Nationalist Congress Party	Eknath	Eknath Shinde
46		Devendra Fadnavis (MLA for Nagpur South West Constituency No. 52- Nagpur District) (Legislative Assembly) (Chief_Minister); In Charge	05 December 2024	21 December 2024	16 days	Bharatiya Janata Party	Fadnavis III	Devendra Fadnavis
47		Narhari Zirwal (MLA for Dindori Constituency No. 122- Nashik District (Legislative Assembly)	21 December 2024	Incumbent	1 year, 261 days	Nationalist Congress Party	Fadnavis III	Devendra Fadnavis

== Ministers of State ==
No.	Portrait	Deputy Minister (Constituency)	Term of office			Political party	Ministry	Minister	Chief Minister
No.	Portrait	Deputy Minister (Constituency)	From	To	Period	Political party	Ministry	Minister	Chief Minister
Deputy Minister of Special Assistance
Vacant			23 November 2019	28 November 2019	5 days	NA	Fadnavis II	Devendra Fadnavis	Devendra Fadnavis
01		Abdul Sattar Abdul Nabi (MLA for Sillod Constituency No. 104- Chhatrapati Sambhaji Nagar District Also Previously Known Aurangabad District (Legislative Assembly)	30 December 2019	27 June 2022	2 years, 179 days	Shiv Sena	Thackeray	Dhananjay Munde	Uddhav Thackeray
02		Aditi Tatkare (MLA for Shrivardhan Constituency No. 193- Raigad District) (Legislative Assembly); Additional_Charge	27 June 2022	29 June 2022	2 days	Nationalist Congress Party	Thackeray	Dhananjay Munde	Uddhav Thackeray
Vacant			30 June 2022	26 November 2024	2 years, 149 days	NA	Eknath	Eknath Shinde (2022 - 2023); Hasan Mushrif (2023 – 2024)	Eknath Shinde
Vacant			21 December 2024	incumbent	1 year, 261 days	NA	Fadnavis III	Narhari Zirwal (2024 – Present)	Devendra Fadnavis
