= PLO (disambiguation) =

PLO is the Palestine Liberation Organization, an organization for the creation of the independent State of Palestine.

PLO may also refer to:

- Pot Limit Omaha, a poker variant
- People's Law Office, a law office in America
- Plo Koon, a fictional character in Star Wars
- Port Lincoln Airport
- Pregnancy- and lactation-associated osteoporosis, a rare form of osteoporosis
- Pulgaon railway station (station code: PLO), Maharashtra, India

== See also ==
- PL/0, a computer programming language
