= Deoli Assembly constituency =

Deoli might refer to one of the following assembly constituencies in India:

- Deoli, Maharashtra Assembly constituency
- Deoli, Delhi Assembly constituency
