= Deoli, Maharashtra Assembly constituency =

Constituency of the Maharashtra legislative assembly in India

Coordinates: 20.66°N 78.48°E

Deoli-Pulgaon
- Constituency No. 45 for the Maharashtra Legislative Assembly

Constituency details
- Country: India
- Region: Western India
- State: Maharashtra
- District: Wardha
- Lok Sabha constituency: Wardha
- Established: 1962
- Total electors: 274,833

Member of Legislative Assembly
- 15th Maharashtra Legislative Assembly
- Incumbent Rajesh Bhaurao Bakane
- Party: BJP
- Alliance: NDA
- Elected year: 2024

Deoli-Pulgaon Assembly constituency is one of the 288 Vidhan Sabha (legislative assembly) constituencies in the state of Maharashtra in western India. This constituency is one of the four Vidhan Sabha constituencies in Wardha district and comprises the entire Deoli tehsil including Pulgaon town and parts of the Wardha and Hinganghat tehsils of this district.

Deoli-Pulgaon Assembly constituency is part of the Wardha Lok Sabha constituency along with five other Vidhan Sabha segments, namely Wardha, Arvi and Hinganght in Wardha district and Dhamangon Railway and Morshi in Amravati district.

== Members of the Legislative Assembly ==
Year	Member	Party
1962	Shankarrao Sonawane	Indian National Congress
1967	N. R. Kale	Independent
1972	Prabha Rau	Indian National Congress
1978	Prabha Rau	Indian National Congress (I)
1980	Manik Sabane	Indian National Congress (I)
1985	Prabha Rau	Indian National Congress
1990	Saroj Kashikar	Janata Dal
1995	Prabha Rau	Indian National Congress
1999	Ranjit Kamble	Indian National Congress
2004	Ranjit Kamble	Indian National Congress
Before 2008: See Pulgaon Assembly constituency
2009	Ranjit Kamble	Indian National Congress
2014	Ranjit Kamble	Indian National Congress
2019	Ranjit Kamble	Indian National Congress
2024	Rajesh Bakane	Bharatiya Janata Party

== Election results ==
=== Assembly Election 2024 ===
2024 Maharashtra Legislative Assembly election : Deoli
Party	Candidate	Votes	%	±%
BJP	Rajesh Bhaurao Bakane	90,319	47.52%	New
INC	Ranjit Prataprao Kamble	81,011	42.62%	▼0.67
Independent	Kiran Arunrao Thakre	5,927	3.12%	New
BSP	Umesh Mahadeorao Mhaiskar	4,502	2.37%	▼0.60
VBA	Kundan Chokha Jambhulkar	3,947	2.08%	▼2.71
ASP(KR)	Ankush Vijayrao Koche	1,215	0.64%	New
NOTA	None of the Above	850	0.45%	▼0.13
Margin of victory		9,308	4.90%	▼15.68
Turnout		190,908	69.46%	▲5.98
Total valid votes		190,058		
Registered electors		274,833		▼0.23
BJP gain from INC		Swing	▲4.23	

=== Assembly Election 2019 ===
2019 Maharashtra Legislative Assembly election : Deoli
Party	Candidate	Votes	%	±%
INC	Ranjit Prataprao Kamble	75,345	43.29%	▲6.07
Independent	Rajesh Bhauraoji Bakane	39,541	22.72%	New
SS	Samir Sureshrao Deshmukh	30,978	17.80%	▲15.06
VBA	Siddharatha Bhojraj Doifode	8,324	4.78%	New
Independent	Agrawal Dilip Bajranglal	8,016	4.61%	New
BSP	Mohan Ramraoji Raikwar	5,166	2.97%	▼11.90
Independent	Mhaiskar Umesh Mahadeorao	1,617	0.93%	New
NOTA	None of the Above	1,002	0.58%	▲0.16
Margin of victory		35,804	20.57%	▲20.01
Turnout		175,066	63.55%	▼4.45
Total valid votes		174,031		
Registered electors		275,460		▲10.89
INC hold		Swing	▲6.07	

=== Assembly Election 2014 ===
2014 Maharashtra Legislative Assembly election : Deoli
Party	Candidate	Votes	%	±%
INC	Ranjit Prataprao Kamble	62,533	37.22%	▼2.18
BJP	Suresh Ganpatrao Waghmare	61,590	36.66%	▼0.22
BSP	Mhaiskar Umesh Mahadeorao	24,973	14.86%	▲4.27
NCP	Shashank Gangadharrao Ghodmare	6,343	3.78%	New
SS	Nilesh Ramesh Gulhane	4,609	2.74%	New
Independent	Namdeorao Natthuji Meshram	1,907	1.14%	New
Independent	Manoj Manvatkar	1,364	0.81%	New
NOTA	None of the Above	701	0.42%	New
Margin of victory		943	0.56%	▼1.96
Turnout		168,785	67.95%	▲1.43
Total valid votes		168,002		
Registered electors		248,404		▲10.62
INC hold		Swing	▼2.18	

=== Assembly Election 2009 ===
2009 Maharashtra Legislative Assembly election : Deoli
Party	Candidate	Votes	%	±%
INC	Ranjit Prataprao Kamble	58,575	39.40%	New
BJP	Ramdas Tadas	54,829	36.88%	New
BSP	Dr. Vijay Govindrao Raut	15,757	10.60%	New
Independent	Ghodmare Shashank Gangadharrao	10,834	7.29%	New
Independent	Aaglave Vijay Nagorao	3,933	2.65%	New
Independent	Shankar Kamalrao Bawane	1,832	1.23%	New
CPI(M)	Yashwant Namdeorao Zade	1,797	1.21%	New
Margin of victory		3,746	2.52%	
Turnout		148,706	66.22%	
Total valid votes		148,670		
Registered electors		224,565		
INC win (new seat)				

== See also ==
- Deoli
- Pulgaon
- Wardha district
- List of constituencies of Maharashtra Vidhan Sabha
- Maharashtra Vidhan Sabha
