= Ranjit Kamble =

Indian politician (born 1964)

Minister for Rural Development, Horticulture, Water Supply and Sanitation
- In office 7 November 2009 – 28 September 2014

Member of Maharashtra Legislative Assembly
- In office (2009-2014), (2014-2019), (2019 – 2024)
- Preceded by: Constituency Created
- Succeeded by: Rajesh Bhaurao Bakane
- Constituency: Deoli
- In office (1999-2004), (2004 – 2009)
- Preceded by: Prabha Rau
- Succeeded by: Constituency Abolished
- Constituency: Pulgaon

Personal details
- Born: 31 July 1964 (age 62) Hyderabad, Telangana
- Party: Indian National Congress
- Spouse: Purnima Kamble
- Children: 2

Ranjit Prataprao Kamble is the former State Minister of Water Supply and Sanitation, Food and Civil Supplies, Consumer Protection, Tourism and Public Works (PWD) in the Government of Maharashtra in India. He is leader from the Indian National Congress Party. He is the nephew of Former Senior congress leader and MP Prabha Rau.

== Political career ==
He was elected as member of Maharashtra Legislative Assembly from Deoli-Pulgaon, in Wardha district in October 2014. He was also MLA from Deoli-Pulgaon from 1999 to 2004, 2004–09, and 2009–14.

Preceded by	State Minister of Water Supply and Sanitation, Food and Civil Supplies, Consumer Protection, Tourism and Public Works(PWD); 20 November 2010 –	Succeeded by incumbent

== Held Positions ==
2013 – Appointed Guardian Minister of Bhandara District.
