= Pulgaon Assembly constituency =

Former constituency of the Maharashtra legislative assembly in India

Coordinates: 20.72°N 78.32°E

Pulgaon
- Former constituency for the Maharashtra Legislative Assembly

Constituency details
- Country: India
- Region: Western India
- State: Maharashtra
- Lok Sabha constituency: Wardha
- Established: 1962
- Abolished: 2008

Pulgaon Assembly constituency was one of the seats in Maharashtra Legislative Assembly in India. It was made defunct after constituency map of India was redrawn in 2008. It was part of Wardha Lok Sabha constituency.

== Members of Legislative Assembly ==
Year	Member	Party
1962	Shankarrao Sonawane	Indian National Congress
1967	N. R. Kale	Independent
1972	Prabha Rau	Indian National Congress
1978	Prabha Rau	Indian National Congress (I)
1980	Manik Sabane	Indian National Congress (I)
1985	Prabha Rau	Indian National Congress
1990	Saroj Kashikar	Janata Dal
1995	Prabha Rau	Indian National Congress
1999	Ranjit Kamble	Indian National Congress
2004	Ranjit Kamble	Indian National Congress
Till 2008: See Deoli Assembly constituency
2009	Ranjit Kamble	Indian National Congress
2014	Ranjit Kamble	Indian National Congress
2019	Ranjit Kamble	Indian National Congress
2024	Rajesh Bakane	Bharatiya Janata Party

== Election results ==
=== Assembly Election 2004 ===
2004 Maharashtra Legislative Assembly election : Pulgaon
Party	Candidate	Votes	%	±%
INC	Ranjit Prataprao Kamble	58,836	42.46%	▼1.18
INC	Shende Pramod Bhusaheb	53,963	38.94%	▼4.70
SBP	Sau. Saroj Ravi Kashikar	38,151	27.53%	New
Independent	Shyam Gaikwad	34,731	25.06%	New
BSP	Thakur Pradeepsingh Ujagarsingh	19,223	13.87%	New
BSP	Dr. Gode Shirish Santoshrao	15,519	11.20%	New
SS	Ravikant Panduranj Balpande	10,883	7.85%	New
Margin of victory		4,873	3.52%	▼16.52
Turnout		1,38,704	65.12%	▲4.98
Total valid votes		1,38,579		
Registered electors		2,13,009		▲15.45
INC hold		Swing	▼1.18	

=== Assembly Election 1999 ===
1999 Maharashtra Legislative Assembly election : Pulgaon
Party	Candidate	Votes	%	±%
INC	Ranjit Prataprao Kamble	44,977	43.64%	▲11.46
NCP	Ramdas Tadas	24,326	23.60%	New
BJP	Charansingh Chawre	15,459	15.00%	▲5.74
Independent	Prakashbhau Kelkar	12,199	11.84%	New
Independent	Gupta Gaurishankar Rameshwarji	2,476	2.40%	New
Independent	Daphare Pandurang Vithobaji	2,071	2.01%	New
Margin of victory		20,651	20.04%	▲6.95
Turnout		1,10,958	60.14%	▼14.82
Total valid votes		1,03,060		
Registered electors		1,84,498		▲3.14
INC hold		Swing	▲11.46	

=== Assembly Election 1995 ===
1995 Maharashtra Legislative Assembly election : Pulgaon
Party	Candidate	Votes	%	±%
INC	Prabha Anand Rao	43,148	32.18%	▼5.56
Independent	Deshmukh Sureshrao Bapuraoji	25,597	19.09%	New
Independent	Kashikar Saroj Ravi	22,382	16.69%	New
JD	Arun Nathobaji Lohakare	13,370	9.97%	▼28.68
BJP	Fulkari Purushottam Chindhuji	12,419	9.26%	▲3.93
BBM	Bhende Dadaji Jagobaji	7,940	5.92%	New
Independent	Uike Shrawan Budhaji	1,338	1.00%	New
Margin of victory		17,551	13.09%	▲12.17
Turnout		1,36,880	76.52%	▲11.25
Total valid votes		1,34,083		
Registered electors		1,78,880		▲16.99
INC gain from JD		Swing	▼6.47	

=== Assembly Election 1990 ===
1990 Maharashtra Legislative Assembly election : Pulgaon
Party	Candidate	Votes	%	±%
JD	Saroj Ravi Kashikar	37,651	38.65%	New
INC	Prabha Rau	36,758	37.74%	▼14.89
Independent	Fulzele Jalandar Bajirao	9,806	10.07%	New
BJP	Vijaykumar Devedaspant Nival	5,197	5.34%	New
Independent	Paniya Jugalkishor Haridas	3,250	3.34%	New
BSP	Yeshankhede Sahebrao Uttam	2,870	2.95%	New
Independent	Madavi Uttamrao Shripatrao	683	0.70%	New
Margin of victory		893	0.92%	▼25.13
Turnout		99,088	64.81%	▲3.33
Total valid votes		97,403		
Registered electors		1,52,897		▲23.23
JD gain from INC		Swing	▼13.97	

=== Assembly Election 1985 ===
1985 Maharashtra Legislative Assembly election : Pulgaon
Party	Candidate	Votes	%	±%
INC	Prabha Anand Rao	39,419	52.62%	New
IC(S)	Karlekar Vasantrao Janardanrao	19,909	26.58%	New
RPI(K)	Naydu Nilkanth Hanumant	11,389	15.20%	New
Independent	Ghodeswar Prabhakar Shankarrao	2,074	2.77%	New
Independent	Kadi Narayanrao Dadaji	909	1.21%	New
Independent	Fulzele Jalandar Bajirao	553	0.74%	New
Margin of victory		19,510	26.05%	▼19.54
Turnout		76,055	61.30%	▲7.10
Total valid votes		74,906		
Registered electors		1,24,074		▲7.99
INC gain from INC(I)		Swing	▼15.39	

=== Assembly Election 1980 ===
1980 Maharashtra Legislative Assembly election : Pulgaon
Party	Candidate	Votes	%	±%
INC(I)	Manik Mahadeorao Sabane	41,626	68.01%	▼1.67
INC(U)	Prabha Rau	13,725	22.43%	New
Independent	Manwatkar Ramkrushna Chandranhan	2,689	4.39%	New
BJP	Ganpatrao Sadashio Chandekar	2,076	3.39%	New
Independent	Arunkumar Nathuji Lohakare	1,087	1.78%	New
Margin of victory		27,901	45.59%	▼5.65
Turnout		62,282	54.21%	▼23.42
Total valid votes		61,203		
Registered electors		1,14,891		▲6.18
INC(I) hold		Swing	▼1.67	

=== Assembly Election 1978 ===
1978 Maharashtra Legislative Assembly election : Pulgaon
Party	Candidate	Votes	%	±%
INC(I)	Prabha Anand Rao	57,827	69.69%	New
RPI(K)	Khobaragade Durwas Laluji	15,310	18.45%	▲13.31
INC	Dhande Shankarrao Balaji	8,745	10.54%	▼54.50
Independent	Babhale Bhagwat Zitruji	606	0.73%	New
Margin of victory		42,517	51.24%	▲5.87
Turnout		84,772	78.35%	▲11.36
Total valid votes		82,980		
Registered electors		1,08,201		▲13.53
INC(I) gain from INC		Swing	▲4.65	

=== Assembly Election 1972 ===
1972 Maharashtra Legislative Assembly election : Pulgaon
Party	Candidate	Votes	%	±%
INC	Prabha Anand Rao	40,499	65.04%	▲34.94
AIFB	Motilal Shamlal Kapoor	12,248	19.67%	New
RPI	Devidas Balkrishna Patil	5,049	8.11%	▼14.87
RPI(K)	Arunkumar T. Ramteke	3,198	5.14%	New
ABJS	Pohekar Ramrao Bapuji	1,273	2.04%	New
Margin of victory		28,251	45.37%	▲36.88
Turnout		63,820	66.96%	▼0.29
Total valid votes		62,267		
Registered electors		95,306		▲3.74
INC gain from Independent		Swing	▲26.45	

=== Assembly Election 1967 ===
1967 Maharashtra Legislative Assembly election : Pulgaon
Party	Candidate	Votes	%	±%
Independent	N. R. Kale	23,267	38.59%	New
INC	S. V. Sonawane	18,146	30.10%	▼12.65
RPI	D. S. Meshram	13,852	22.98%	▼10.28
Independent	S. W. Pandya	1,563	2.59%	New
Independent	A. S. Sonawane	1,473	2.44%	New
Independent	S. K. Bhora	668	1.11%	New
Independent	W. G. Ambade	629	1.04%	New
Margin of victory		5,121	8.49%	▼0.99
Turnout		65,361	71.15%	▲4.23
Total valid votes		60,291		
Registered electors		91,867		▲16.92
Independent gain from INC		Swing	▼4.15	

=== Assembly Election 1962 ===
1962 Maharashtra Legislative Assembly election : Pulgaon
Party	Candidate	Votes	%	±%
INC	Shankarrao Vithlrao Sonawane	20,621	42.74%	New
RPI	Dharmdas Sakharam	16,044	33.26%	New
ABJS	Ganpat Sadashiorao Chandekar	5,585	11.58%	New
Independent	Krushnarao Nimbaji Karode	5,341	11.07%	New
Independent	Haridas Munsiji Upadhye	651	1.35%	New
Margin of victory		4,577	9.49%	
Turnout		52,542	66.87%	
Total valid votes		48,242		
Registered electors		78,575		
INC win (new seat)				

== See also ==
- Wardha District
- List of constituencies of Maharashtra Legislative Assembly
