= Dhanraj Mahale =

Indian politician

Member of Legislative Assembly Maharashtra
- In office October 2009 – September 2014
- Preceded by: Narhari Sitaram Zirwal
- Succeeded by: Narhari Sitaram Zirwal
- Constituency: Dindori

Personal details
- Party: Shiv Sena

Dhanraj Mahale is a Shiv Sena politician from Nashik district. He was a member of Maharashtra Legislative Assembly representing Dindori Vidhan Sabha constituency from 2009 to 2014.

== Positions held ==
- 2009: Elected as Member of Maharashtra Legislative Assembly
