= Rajendra Patil Yadravkar =

Indian politician

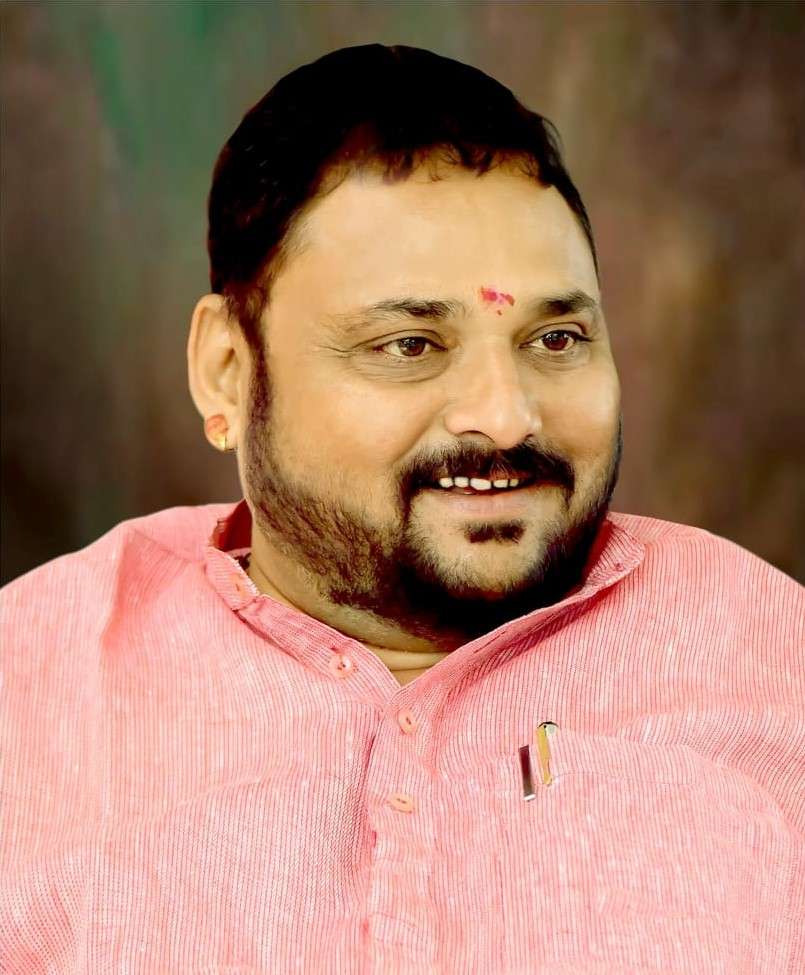

Minister of State Government of Maharashtra
- In office 30 December 2019 – 27 June 2022
- Minister: Public Health and Family Welfare; Medical Education.; Food and Drug Administration; Textiles; Cultural Affairs
- Governor: Bhagat Singh Koshyari
- Chief Minister: Uddhav Thackeray
- Deputy CM: Ajit Pawar

Member of the Maharashtra Legislative Assembly
- Incumbent
- Assumed office October 2019
- Preceded by: Ulhas Patil
- Constituency: Shirol

Personal details
- Born: 5 May 1970 (age 56) Yadrav, Shirol Taluka, Kolhapur District
- Party: Rajarshi Shahu Vikas Aghadi
- Other political affiliations: Nationalist Congress Party; Indian National Congress

Dr. Rajendra Shamraoji Patil (Yadravkar) is a politician from Kolhapur district, Maharashtra who was Minister of State in the government of Maharashtra formed by Shiv Sena party. He was appointed Minister of state for Public Health & Family Welfare, Medical Education, Food & Drug Administration, Textile, Culture Affairs in the Government of Maharashtra. He is now a Member of Maharashtra Legislative Assembly from Shirol Vidhan Sabha constituency elected as an independent member.

== Positions held ==
- 2019: Elected to Maharashtra Legislative Assembly
- 2019: Appointed Minister of State Government of Maharashtra
- 2019: Appointed minister of state for Public Health & Family Welfare, Medical Education, Food & Drug Administration, Textile, Culture Affairs in the Government of Maharashtra
- 2024: Elected to Maharashtra Legislative Assembly

== See also ==
- Uddhav Thackeray ministry
