= Narhari Zirwal =

Indian politician (born 1959)

Narhari Sitaram Zirwal

Cabinet Minister in Maharashtra
- Incumbent
- Assumed office 15 December 2024
- Cabinet: Fadnavis III
- Chief Minister: Devendra Fadnavis
- Ministry & Departments: Food & Drug Administration; Special Assistance
- Guardian Minister: Hingoli

18th Deputy Speaker of Maharashtra Legislative Assembly
- In office 14 March 2020 – 26 November 2024
- Governor: Bhagat Singh Koshyari; Ramesh Bais; C. P. Radhakrishnan
- Speaker: Nana Patole; Rahul Narwekar
- Preceded by: Vijayrao Bhaskarrao Auti
- Succeeded by: Anna Bansode

Speaker of the Maharashtra Legislative Assembly
- Acting; 4 February 2021 – 3 July 2022
- Governor: Bhagat Singh Koshyari
- Deputy: Himself
- Preceded by: Nana Patole
- Succeeded by: Rahul Narwekar

Member of Maharashtra Legislative Assembly
- Incumbent
- Assumed office 31 October 2014
- Preceded by: Dhanraj Mahale
- Constituency: Dindori
- In office 23 November 2004 – 30 October 2009
- Preceded by: Ramdas Charoskar
- Succeeded by: Dhanraj Mahale
- Constituency: Dindori

Personal details
- Born: 19 June 1959 (age 66) Dindori, Bombay State, India
- Party: Nationalist Congress Party
- Occupation: Politician

Narhari Sitaram Zirwal (born 19 June 1959) is an Indian politician who is serving as a cabinet minister in Third Fadnavis ministry. He previously served as the Deputy Speaker of Maharashtra Legislative Assembly and is a member of the Nationalist Congress Party. He is a Five term member of the Maharashtra Legislative Assembly from Dindori in Maharashtra.

== Positions held ==
- Member of the Maharashtra Legislative Assembly (MLA) for 5 Terms: 1999-2004, 2009-2014, 2014–present.
