= Urmila Singh =

Indian politician (1946–2018)

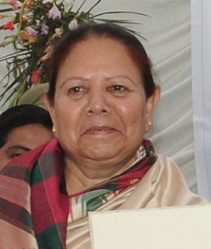

17th Governor of Himachal Pradesh
- In office 25 January 2010 – 28 January 2015
- Preceded by: Prabha Rau
- Succeeded by: Kalyan Singh (additional charge)

Member of the Madhya Pradesh Legislative Assembly
- In office 1993–2003
- Preceded by: Thakur Dal Singh
- Succeeded by: Ram Gulam Uikey
- Constituency: Ghansor
- In office 1985–1990

Personal details
- Born: 6 August 1946 Raipur, Central Provinces and Berar, British India
- Died: 29 May 2018 (aged 71) Indore, Madhya Pradesh, India
- Party: Indian National Congress
- Spouse: Bhagwat Singh
- Children: 4 (2 daughter and 2 sons)
- Parent: Suryadev Singh (father)
- Education: B.A.LLB
- As of 13 June, 2018 Source: ["Biography:Singh, Urmila" (PDF). Madhya Pradesh Legislative Assembly.]

Urmila Singh (6 August 1946 – 29 May 2018) was an Indian politician who served as the Governor of Himachal Pradesh from 25 January 2010 to 28 January 2015.

== Early life ==
Urmila Singh was born in Phingeshwar village in Raipur district, now located in Chhattisgarh state, into a land owning Adivasi family of central India, which also produced freedom fighters and social reformers. Urmila's great-grandfather, Raja Natwar Singh (alias Lalla Shah) of Haridaypur, was a freedom fighter, who was executed by the British rulers. Some other family members were deported to serve sentences in the Andaman and Nicobar Islands.

Urmila Singh was married at a young age to Virendra Bahadur Singh, Raja of Seraipally princely state in Chhattisgarh. The couple became the parents of one daughter and two sons and Urmila Singh devoted herself to the nurture of her family. Virendra Bahadur Singh became a prominent Congress party political and a member of the Madhya Pradesh Legislative Assembly, elected from the areas that his family had previously ruled for several centuries. His mother, Rani Shyam Kumari Devi, was a Member of Parliament.

== Political career ==
=== In Madhya Pradesh ===
After the sudden early death of her husband, Urmila Singh stepped into the political arena to contest the assembly seat previously held by him. She was duly elected for several consecutive terms from the family borough to the Madhya Pradesh assembly and remained a member from 1985 to 2003.

She served as a Minister of State for Dairy Development (1993–95) and as Cabinet Minister for Social Welfare and Tribal Welfare (1998–2003). She also served as President of the MP Congress between 1996 and 1998.

=== In Chhattisgarh ===
The new state of Chhattisgarh was carved out of Madhya Pradesh in 2000, and Urmila's constituency now fell to the portion of the new state. Urmila Singh was therefore automatically a member of the first ever legislative assembly of Chhattisgarh between 2000 and 2003. The Congress party suffered a rout in both states in the 2003 assembly elections and Urmila Singh was one of the casualties. She lost the elections in 2008 also.

=== As Governor ===
In recognition of her services to the congress party, the congress-led central government appointed her governor of Himachal Pradesh in 2010. She took office on 25 January 2010 and completed her term on 24 January 2015, becoming the first woman governor in Himachal to do so.

== Death ==
Urmila Singh died on 29 May 2018, aged 71. According to family sources, she had been suffering from brain-related complications. She was admitted to a private hospital where her condition remained unstable. She is survived by her two sons and a daughter.
