= Ulhas Patil =

Indian politician

Dr. Ulhas Patil

Member of Legislative Assembly of Maharashtra
- In office 2014–2019
- Preceded by: Satgonda Revgonda Patil
- Succeeded by: Rajendra Patil Yadravkar
- Constituency: Shirol

Personal details
- Born: 27 October 1962 (age 63) Shirol
- Party: Shivsena
- Website: www.ulhaspatil.com

Ulhas Sambhaji Patil is a politician from Kolhapur district, Maharashtra. He was a member of the 13th Maharashtra Legislative Assembly. He represents the Shirol Assembly Constituency as a member of Shiv Sena. He was born in a farmer's family and knew the basic problems of farmers from childhood. This propelled him to fight for farmers’ problems. Ulhas Patil started his work in the early 1990s. He has organized many protests for farmers in Kolhapur district.

He first filled his candidature for Vidhan Sabha from Shirol assembly constituency from Swabhimani Shetkari Sanghtna and then in 2014 from Shiv Sena and was elected as a member of legislative assembly for the first time.

He contested the 2024 assembly election from Swabhimani Shetkari Sanghatana.

== Positions held ==
- 2014: Elected to Maharashtra Legislative Assembly

== See also ==
- Hatkanangle Lok Sabha constituency
