= Ratnappa Kumbhar =

Indian politician (1909–1998)

Dr Ratnappa Kumbhar
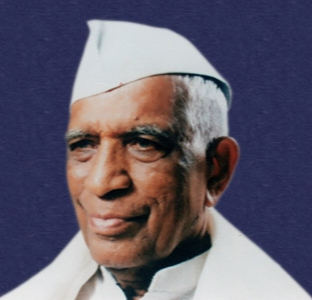

Personal details
- Born: 15 September 1909 Nimshirgaon
- Died: 23 September 1998 (aged 89)
- Party: Indian National Congress
- Occupation: Politician

Dr Ratnappa Bharamappa Kumbhar (15 September 1909 – 23 December 1998), also called Deshbhakt Ratnappa Kumbhar, was an Indian independence activist from Ichalkaranji, who actively participated in the Indian independence movement. He was one of the persons to sign the Final Draft of the Constitution of India along with B. R. Ambedkar. He received Padma Shri award in 1985 (social work). He was Member of the Parliament, Member of Legislative Council and also worked as a Minister of Food and Civil Supplies in Maharashtra Government.

== Biography ==
Dr. Ratnappa Kumbhar was born into a Lingayat pottery family at Nimshirgaon village in Shirol tehsil.

== Indian independence movement ==
During his youth he was keenly interested in political and social work and mobilized support under the Praja Parishad banner against the local princely state rulers with Madhavrao Bagal and other associates like Dinakara Desai He and Desai were arrested on 8 July 1939. Kumbhar, Bagal, Desai and others were arrested and fined by Kolhapur State He actively participated in the freedom movement and later went underground for about 6 years. He was on the forefront of an agitation for dissolution of princely states. He was also elected as a member of the Constituent Assembly of India. For his long devotion to the independence movement, he was called Deshbhakt ("Patriot") Ratnappa Kumbhar.

== Political career ==
After Independence, Kumbhar was elected to the 1st Lok Sabha from the Kolhapur cum Satara constituency. He was responsible for founding a sugar mill in Ichalkaranji.

Between 1962 and 1982 and from 1990 till his death in 1998, he was a member of the Maharashtra Legislative Assembly representing the Shirol constituency. From 1974 until 1978 he was Minister of State for home and civil supplies. He was instrumental in bringing about the industrial and agricultural prosperity of Shirol and Hatkanangle tehsil of Kolhapur.

== Co-operative Movement ==
Ratnappa Kumbhar, undertook various Co-operative Movements and also ran them successfully, including:

1. Panchaganga Sahakari Sakhar Karkhana Ltd. Ganganagar Ichalkaranji.
2. Peoples Co-operative Bank Ltd.
3. The Kolhapur Zilla Sahakari Shetakari Vinkari Soot Girani Ltd
4. The Janata Central co-operative consumer stores Ltd.

Ratnappa Kumbhar died in the morning of 23 December 1998, at the age of 89.

- The Deshbhakt Ratnappa Kumbhar College of Commerce college in Kolhapur is named after him.
- In Kamptee taluka of Nagpur district Mr. Ramdas Khopey established a school named after Deshbhakta Ratnappa Kumbhar.
