= Pulgaon railway station =

Railway station in Maharashtra, India

Pulgaon
- Indian Railways logo

General information
- Location: State highway 243, Pulgaon, Maharashtra; India
- Coordinates: 20°43′36″N 78°19′01″E
- Elevation: 272.32 metres (893.4 ft)
- System: Indian Railways junction station
- Owner: Indian Railways
- Operator: Central Railway
- Line: Nagpur–Bhusawal section of Howrah–Nagpur–Mumbai line
- Platforms: 3

Construction
- Structure type: Standard, on ground
- Parking: Available

Other information
- Status: Functioning
- Station code: PLO
- Division(s): Nagpur CR railway division

History
- Opened: 1867
- Former names: Great Indian Peninsula Railway
Location
- Location within Maharashtra Location within India

Pulgaon railway station serves Pulgaon in Wardha district in the Indian state of Maharashtra. Pulgaon is on the banks of Wardha River.

== History ==
The first train in India travelled from Mumbai to Thane on 16 April 1853. By May 1854, Great Indian Peninsula Railway's Bombay–Thane line was extended to Kalyan. Bhusawal railway station was set up in 1860 and in 1867 the GIPR branch line was extended to Nagpur.

In 1917, Arvi was linked with Pulgaon with a 35 km (22 mi)-long 762 mm (2 ft 6 in) narrow-gauge railway by Central Provinces Railway. Central Railway now runs two trains a day on weekdays. The round trip takes a little over three hours.

=== Electrification ===
The railways in the Badnera–Wardha sector were electrified in 1990–91.

== Amenities ==
Pulgaon railway station has the following amenities: waiting room and light refreshment stall.

== Gallery ==
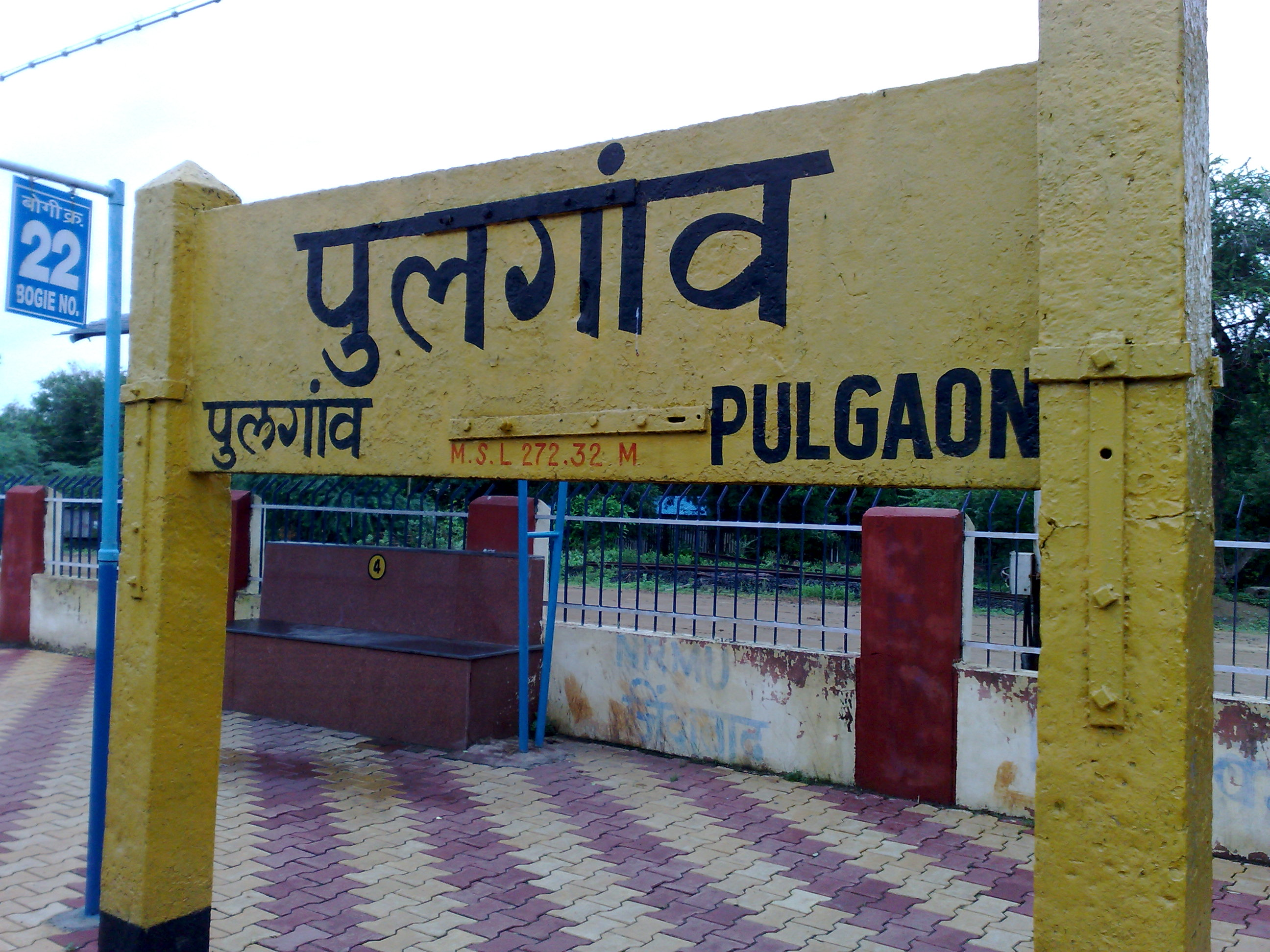
Pulgaon station railway station board

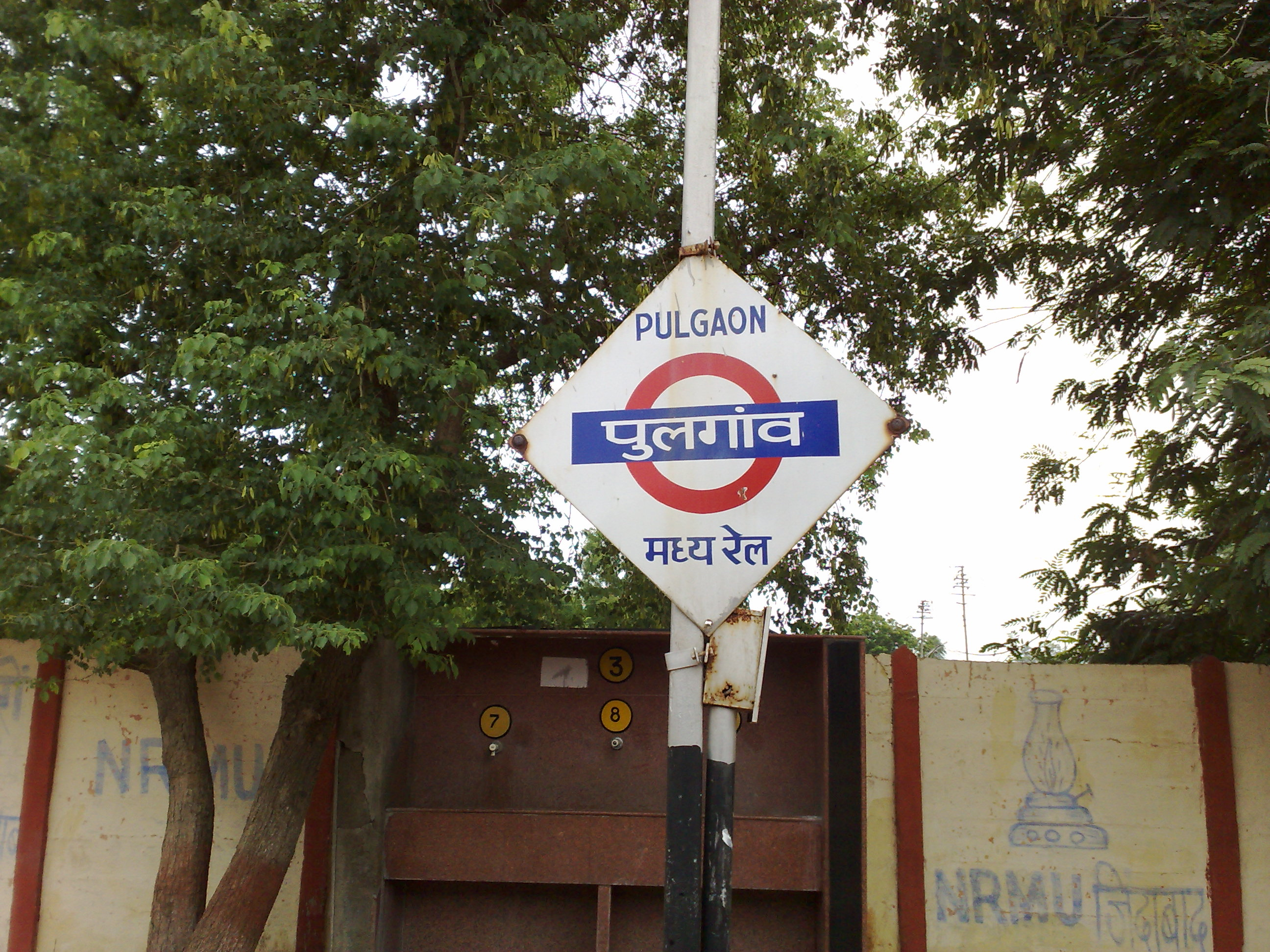
Pulgaon station platform board

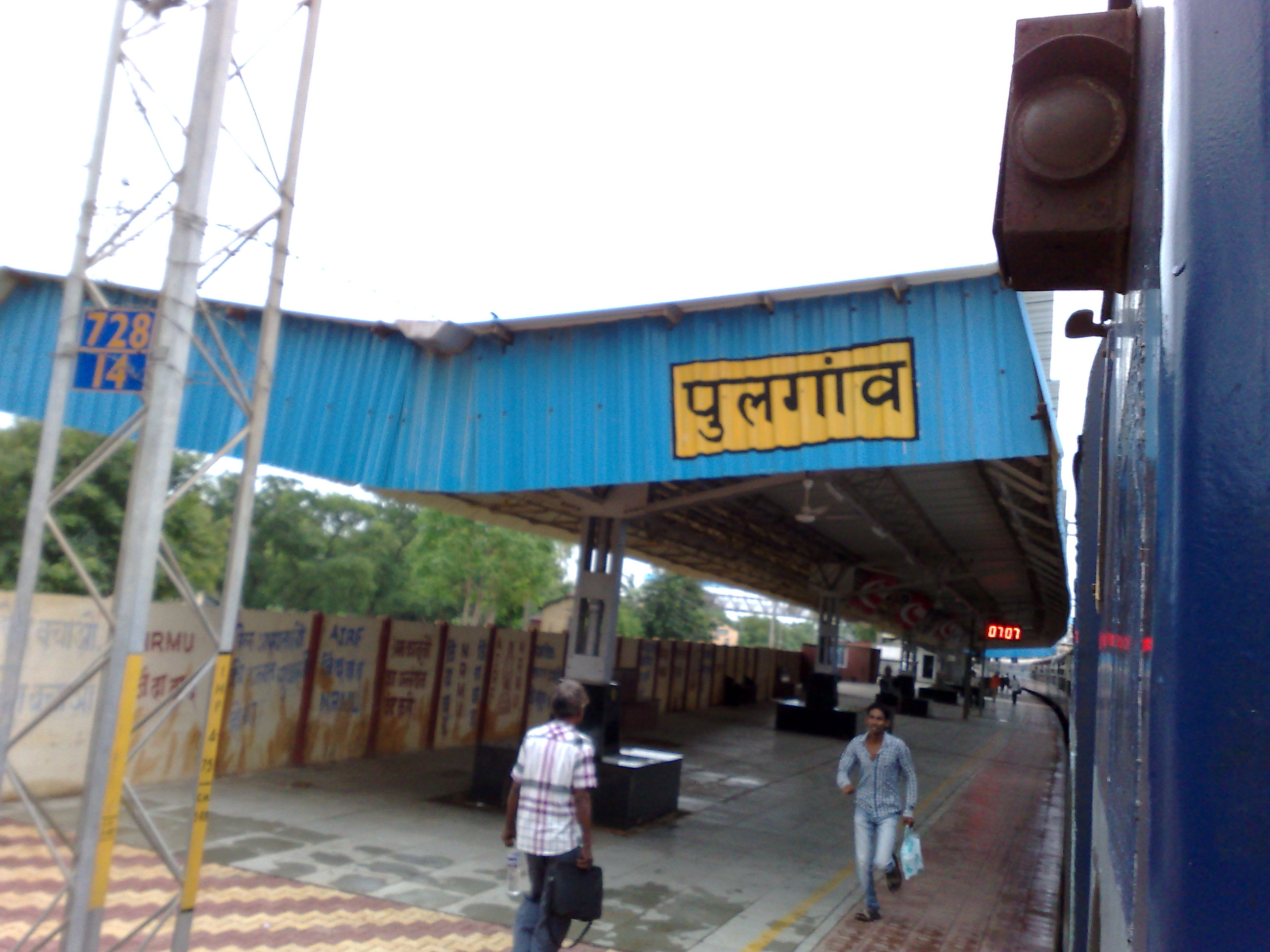
Pulgaon station roof

Preceding station	Indian Railways	Following station
Kaotha towards ?	Central Railway zone Howrah–Nagpur–Mumbai line	Talni towards ?
Terminus	Central Railway zone Pulgaon–Arvi branch line	Arvi towards ?
