= Kacharu Bhau Raut =

Indian politician

Kacharu Bhau Raut was a member of the 11th Lok Sabha of India. He represented the Malegaon constituency of Maharashtra and is a member of the Bharatiya Janata Party political party.
