= Rajesh Bhaurao Bakane =

Indian politician

Member of the Maharashtra Legislative Assembly
- Incumbent
- Assumed office 2024
- Preceded by: Ranjit Kamble
- Constituency: Deoli

Personal details
- Political party: Bharatiya Janata Party
- Children: Gauresh Bakane
- Parent: Bhauraoji Ramkrishan Bakane
- Profession: Politician & Social Activist

Rajesh Bhaurao Bakane is an Indian politician from Maharashtra. He is a member of the Maharashtra Legislative Assembly, representing Deoli, Maharashtra Assembly constituency as a member of the Bharatiya Janata Party.

== Political career ==
Rajesh Bakane is a member of the Rashtriya Swayamsevak Sangh (RSS), a far-right Hindu nationalist paramilitary volunteer organisation.

== See also ==
- List of chief ministers of Maharashtra
- Maharashtra Legislative Assembly
