= Dindori, Maharashtra Assembly constituency =

Constituency of the Maharashtra legislative assembly in India

Coordinates: 20.20°N 73.83°E

Dindori
- Constituency No. 122 for the Maharashtra Legislative Assembly

Constituency details
- Country: India
- Region: Western India
- State: Maharashtra
- District: Nashik
- Lok Sabha constituency: Dindori
- Established: 1952
- Total electors: 329,389
- Reservation: ST

Member of Legislative Assembly
- 15th Maharashtra Legislative Assembly
- Incumbent Narhari Sitaram Zirwal
- Party: NCP
- Alliance: NDA
- Elected year: 2024

Dindori Assembly constituency is one of the 288 Vidhan Sabha (legislative assembly) constituencies of Maharashtra state in western India. It is reserved for the Scheduled Tribes (ST) community.

== Overview ==
Dindori (दिंडोरी) Vidhan Sabha seat is part of the Dindori Lok Sabha constituency along with five other Vidhan Sabha segments, namely Chandwad, Kalvan, Nandgaon, Niphad and Yeola. All the constituencies are situated in Nashik district.

== Members of Legislative Assembly ==
Year	Member	Party
1952	Dwarikaprasad Anantram; Roopsingh Umraosingh	Indian National Congress
1957	Daokhar Fakirrao Sakharam; Bagul Ramdas Pandu	Communist Party of India
1962	Raghunath Gopalrao Gunjal	Indian National Congress
1967	S. B. Ptinde	Peasants and Workers Party of India
1972	Kacharu Bhau Raut	Indian National Congress
1978	Bhagawantrao Dharmaji Gaikwad	Indian National Congress
1980	Haribhau Shankar Mahale	Janata Party
1985	Haribhau Shankar Mahale	Janata Party
1990	Bhagawantrao Dharmaji Gaikwad	Indian National Congress
1995	Charoskar Kisan Govind	Indian National Congress
1999	Charoskar Ramdas Kisanrao	Nationalist Congress Party
2004	Narhari Sitaram Zirwal	Nationalist Congress Party
2009	Dhanraj Mahale	Shiv Sena
2014	Narhari Sitaram Zirwal	Nationalist Congress Party
2019	Narhari Sitaram Zirwal	Nationalist Congress Party
2024	Narhari Sitaram Zirwal	Nationalist Congress Party

== Election results ==
=== Assembly Election 2024 ===
2024 Maharashtra Legislative Assembly election : Dindori
Party	Candidate	Votes	%	±%
Nationalist Congress Party (post–2023)	Narhari Sitaram Zirwal	138,622	53.98%	New
NCP-SP	Charoskar Sunita Ramdas	94,219	36.69%	New
Independent	Sushila Shivaji Charoskar	9,704	3.78%	New
Independent	Santosh Manik Rahere	4,301	1.67%	New
VBA	Yogesh Uttam Bhusar	3,619	1.41%	▼5.10
NOTA	None of the above	1,673	0.65%	▼0.46
Margin of victory		44,403	17.29%	▼12.11
Turnout		258,484	78.47%	▲8.81
Total valid votes		256,811		
Registered electors		329,389		▲9.70
Nationalist Congress Party (post–2023) gain from NCP		Swing	▼6.21	

=== Assembly Election 2019 ===
2019 Maharashtra Legislative Assembly election : Dindori
Party	Candidate	Votes	%	±%
NCP	Narhari Sitaram Zirwal	124,520	60.19%	▲26.15
SS	Bhaskar Gopal Gavit	63,707	30.80%	▲3.06
VBA	Arun Dattatray Gaikwad	13,476	6.51%	New
MNS	Adv. Tikaram Katthu Bagul	3,148	1.52%	▼2.67
NOTA	None of the above	2,298	1.11%	▲0.50
BSP	Jana Somnath Vatar	2,021	0.98%	
Margin of victory		60,813	29.40%	▲23.10
Turnout		209,172	69.66%	▼5.33
Total valid votes		206,872		
Registered electors		300,260		▲11.54
NCP hold		Swing	▲26.15	

=== Assembly Election 2014 ===
2014 Maharashtra Legislative Assembly election : Dindori
Party	Candidate	Votes	%	±%
NCP	Narhari Sitaram Zirwal	68,284	34.04%	▼9.56
SS	Dhanraj Mahale	55,651	27.74%	▼15.96
INC	Charoskar Ramdas Kisanrao	43,415	21.64%	New
CPI(M)	Adv. Dattu Sitaram Padvi	13,924	6.94%	▼0.08
MNS	Sudhakar Dhondiram Raut	8,406	4.19%	New
BJP	Ashok Shivaji Burunge	6,996	3.49%	New
BSP	Chandrashekhar Baburao Kamble	1,966	0.98%	▼0.11
NOTA	None of the above	1,230	0.61%	New
Margin of victory		12,633	6.30%	▲6.21
Turnout		201,870	74.99%	▲10.29
Total valid votes		200,596		
Registered electors		269,205		▲10.96
NCP gain from SS		Swing	▼9.66	

=== Assembly Election 2009 ===
2009 Maharashtra Legislative Assembly election : Dindori
Party	Candidate	Votes	%	±%
SS	Dhanraj Mahale	68,569	43.70%	▲24.06
NCP	Zirwal Narhari Sitaram	68,420	43.60%	▲0.52
CPI(M)	Gangode Madhukar Dagu	11,022	7.02%	▼0.07
Independent	Hadal Ramesh Shivram	3,685	2.35%	New
Independent	Topale Mahesh Govardhan	2,184	1.39%	New
BSP	Karate Vishnu Kashinath	1,706	1.09%	▼1.67
Independent	Nathe Suresh Vithoba	1,333	0.85%	New
Margin of victory		149	0.09%	▼20.75
Turnout		156,967	64.70%	▲2.77
Total valid votes		156,919		
Registered electors		242,616		▲5.75
SS gain from NCP		Swing	▲0.62	

=== Assembly Election 2004 ===
2004 Maharashtra Legislative Assembly election : Dindori
Party	Candidate	Votes	%	±%
NCP	Narhari Sitaram Zirwal	61,205	43.08%	▲10.80
Independent	Ramdas Kisanrao Charoskar	31,606	22.25%	New
SS	Dr. B. L. Gangurde	27,900	19.64%	▼1.75
CPI(M)	Gavit Chintaman Janu	10,075	7.09%	▼2.56
Independent	Bendkoli Vishnupant Mahadu	5,846	4.12%	New
BSP	Gavit Gulab Kalu	3,926	2.76%	▲1.60
Independent	Karate Parashram (Pappu) Karbhari	1,499	1.06%	New
Margin of victory		29,599	20.84%	▲9.95
Turnout		142,073	61.93%	▲2.42
Total valid votes		142,057		
Registered electors		229,427		▲23.25
NCP hold		Swing	▲10.80	

=== Assembly Election 1999 ===
1999 Maharashtra Legislative Assembly election : Dindori
Party	Candidate	Votes	%	±%
NCP	Charoskar Ramdas Kisanrao	32,522	32.28%	New
SS	Gumbade Somnath Sakharam	21,551	21.39%	▼10.80
INC	Gaikwad Panditrao Narayan	17,043	16.92%	▼22.28
Independent	Khoskar Hiraman Bhika	14,568	14.46%	New
CPI(M)	Bhagare Hiraman Amrita	9,723	9.65%	▲1.55
Independent	Chaudhari Anandrao Badu	3,699	3.67%	New
BSP	Ghute Sudam Santuji	1,168	1.16%	▲0.51
Margin of victory		10,971	10.89%	▲3.88
Turnout		110,778	59.51%	▼15.42
Total valid votes		100,750		
Registered electors		186,149		▲0.91
NCP gain from INC		Swing	▼6.92	

=== Assembly Election 1995 ===
1995 Maharashtra Legislative Assembly election : Dindori
Party	Candidate	Votes	%	±%
INC	Charoskar Kisan Govind	51,970	39.20%	▼11.75
SS	Gumbade Somnath Sakharam	42,682	32.19%	▲5.03
JD	Mahale Haribhau Shankar	20,785	15.68%	▼3.46
CPI(M)	Surade Sahemrao Raghunath	10,737	8.10%	New
Independent	Pawar Yeshwantrao Maharu	2,683	2.02%	New
Independent	Khetade Vishwanath Babanrao	980	0.74%	New
BSP	Karate Dada Ananda	862	0.65%	▼0.19
Margin of victory		9,288	7.01%	▼16.78
Turnout		138,217	74.93%	▲19.14
Total valid votes		132,584		
Registered electors		184,464		▲22.41
INC hold		Swing	▼11.75	

=== Assembly Election 1990 ===
1990 Maharashtra Legislative Assembly election : Dindori
Party	Candidate	Votes	%	±%
INC	Gaikwad Bhagawantrao Dharmaji	41,837	50.95%	▲14.27
SS	Khetade Ramdas Daulat	22,302	27.16%	New
JD	Choudhari Ananda Babu	15,714	19.14%	New
Independent	Potinde Govindrao Shankarrao	1,068	1.30%	New
BSP	Hadas Namdeo Pandurang	687	0.84%	New
Margin of victory		19,535	23.79%	▲4.83
Turnout		84,078	55.79%	▼0.30
Total valid votes		82,118		
Registered electors		150,695		▲25.33
INC gain from JP		Swing	▼4.69	

=== Assembly Election 1985 ===
1985 Maharashtra Legislative Assembly election : Dindori
Party	Candidate	Votes	%	±%
JP	Harishankar Mahale	36,851	55.64%	New
INC	Chavan Harischandra Deoram	24,292	36.68%	New
Independent	Karate Dattatray Bala	3,512	5.30%	New
Independent	Ramchandra Punja Mahale	1,577	2.38%	New
Margin of victory		12,559	18.96%	▼7.39
Turnout		67,438	56.09%	▲7.38
Total valid votes		66,232		
Registered electors		120,242		▲11.20
JP gain from JP		Swing	▼2.72	

=== Assembly Election 1980 ===
1980 Maharashtra Legislative Assembly election : Dindori
Party	Candidate	Votes	%	±%
JP	Mahale Haribhau Shankar	29,999	58.36%	New
INC(I)	Lilake Ramdas Ganapat	16,456	32.01%	▼9.60
PWPI	Bomble Trimbak Hari	3,645	7.09%	▼12.09
Independent	Gaikawad Bhagwant Dharmaji	886	1.72%	New
Independent	Tongare Popat Ramchandra	311	0.61%	New
Margin of victory		13,543	26.35%	▲6.33
Turnout		52,671	48.71%	▼8.37
Total valid votes		51,403		
Registered electors		108,131		▲7.10
JP gain from INC(I)		Swing	▲16.75	

=== Assembly Election 1978 ===
1978 Maharashtra Legislative Assembly election : Dindori
Party	Candidate	Votes	%	±%
INC(I)	Gaikwad Bhagawant Dharmaji	23,321	41.61%	New
JP	Amrita Kashiram Gaikwad	12,101	21.59%	New
PWPI	Potinde Govind Shankarrao	10,748	19.18%	▲8.30
INC	Raut Kacharu Bhau	8,596	15.34%	▼44.86
Independent	Page Vasantrao Kalu	1,278	2.28%	New
Margin of victory		11,220	20.02%	▼19.72
Turnout		57,632	57.08%	▲14.00
Total valid votes		56,044		
Registered electors		100,966		▲3.27
INC(I) gain from INC		Swing	▼18.59	

=== Assembly Election 1972 ===
1972 Maharashtra Legislative Assembly election : Dindori
Party	Candidate	Votes	%	±%
INC	Kacharu Bhau Raut	24,340	60.20%	▲14.92
Independent	Ramchandra Makunda Bhoye	8,272	20.46%	New
PWPI	Shankar Bhikaji Potinde	4,401	10.88%	▼43.84
Independent	Sawleram Bhikaji Dhule	1,765	4.37%	New
Independent	Trymbak Hari Bombale	1,022	2.53%	New
CPI(M)	Narayan Dhondi More	632	1.56%	New
Margin of victory		16,068	39.74%	▲30.30
Turnout		42,122	43.08%	▼8.84
Total valid votes		40,432		
Registered electors		97,771		▲21.05
INC gain from PWPI		Swing	▲5.48	

=== Assembly Election 1967 ===
1967 Maharashtra Legislative Assembly election : Dindori
Party	Candidate	Votes	%	±%
PWPI	S. B. Ptinde	20,861	54.72%	New
INC	Kacharu Bhau Raut	17,262	45.28%	▲6.12
Margin of victory		3,599	9.44%	▲1.72
Turnout		41,933	51.92%	▼29.36
Total valid votes		38,123		
Registered electors		80,766		▲67.61
PWPI gain from INC		Swing	▲15.56	

=== Assembly Election 1962 ===
1962 Maharashtra Legislative Assembly election : Dindori
Party	Candidate	Votes	%	±%
INC	Raghunath Gopalrao Gunjal	14,063	39.16%	▲5.13
CPI	Fakirrao Sakharam Dawakhar	11,290	31.44%	▼13.36
Independent	Madhav Pandurang Patil	4,408	12.27%	New
PSP	Punja Bhavrao Thakare	3,971	11.06%	New
Independent	Fakira Walu Karate	1,903	5.30%	New
Independent	Namdeo Madhav Aher	279	0.78%	New
Margin of victory		2,773	7.72%	▲2.52
Turnout		39,167	81.28%	▲2.57
Total valid votes		35,914		
Registered electors		48,186		▼63.22
INC gain from CPI		Swing	▲16.38	

=== Assembly Election 1957 ===
1957 Bombay State Legislative Assembly election : Dindori
Party	Candidate	Votes	%	±%
CPI	Daokhar Fakirrao Sakharam	23,489	22.78%	New
CPI	Bagul Ramdas Pandu	22,709	22.02%	New
INC	Jadhav Madhavrao Laxmanrao	18,129	17.58%	▼43.33
INC	Raut Kacharu Bhau	16,960	16.45%	▼44.46
Independent	Dhule Shankar Ramji	5,128	4.97%	New
Independent	Bhoye Sakkharam Govind	4,506	4.37%	New
Independent	Ghute Khanderao Sajan	4,460	4.33%	New
Independent	Raut Tryambak Pandu	4,130	4.01%	New
RRP	Raut Govinda Laxman	3,608	3.50%	New
Margin of victory		5,360	5.20%	▲1.65
Turnout		103,119	78.71%	▲0.12
Total valid votes		103,119		
Registered electors		131,014		▲40.64
CPI gain from INC		Swing	▼9.45	

=== Assembly Election 1952 ===
1952 Hyderabad State Legislative Assembly election : Dindori
Party	Candidate	Votes	%	±%
INC	Dwarikaprasad Anantram	23,596	32.23%	New
INC	Roopsingh Umraosingh	21,000	28.68%	New
Independent	Shokalsingh Khana	6,629	9.05%	New
ABJS	Phupsingh Ramcharan	6,212	8.48%	New
Socialist	Moolchand Hiralal	4,842	6.61%	New
ABJS	Hannoosingh Kokesh	4,230	5.78%	New
Socialist	Sundersingh Ghursen	4,008	5.47%	New
Independent	Chetram Ganashyam Prasad Choudhari	2,695	3.68%	New
Margin of victory		2,596	3.55%	
Turnout		73,212	78.59%	
Total valid votes		73,212		
Registered electors		93,154		
INC win (new seat)				

== See also ==
- Dindori, Maharashtra
- List of constituencies of Maharashtra Vidhan Sabha
