= Pregnancy and lactation-associated osteoporosis =

- Other names: Pregnancy-associated osteoporosis (PAO)
- Specialty: OB/GYN

Pregnancy- and lactation-associated osteoporosis (PLO; also known as pregnancy-associated osteoporosis) is a rare early presentation of osteoporosis in which women experience low trauma or spontaneous fractures during or soon after pregnancy or lactation.

Fragility fractures of the spine are most commonly described, but the condition can be associated with other types of fracture. The symptoms usually appear during or after a first pregnancy with the most common complaint being severe back pain

The exact causes of the disease are not yet known, and most women with PLO have no known predisposing cause of osteoporosis or bone fragility.

== PLO with vertebral fractures ==
PLO with vertebral fractures is more likely in older and thinner pregnant women during their first pregnancy.
