= Shirol Assembly constituency =

Constituency of the Maharashtra legislative assembly in India

Coordinates: 16.74°N 74.60°E

Shirol
- Constituency No. 280 for the Maharashtra Legislative Assembly
- Rajendra Patil, present MLA of Shirol

Constituency details
- Country: India
- Region: Western India
- State: Maharashtra
- District: Kolhapur
- Lok Sabha constituency: Hatkanangle
- Established: 1952
- Total electors: 329,732
- Reservation: None

Member of Legislative Assembly
- 15th Maharashtra Legislative Assembly
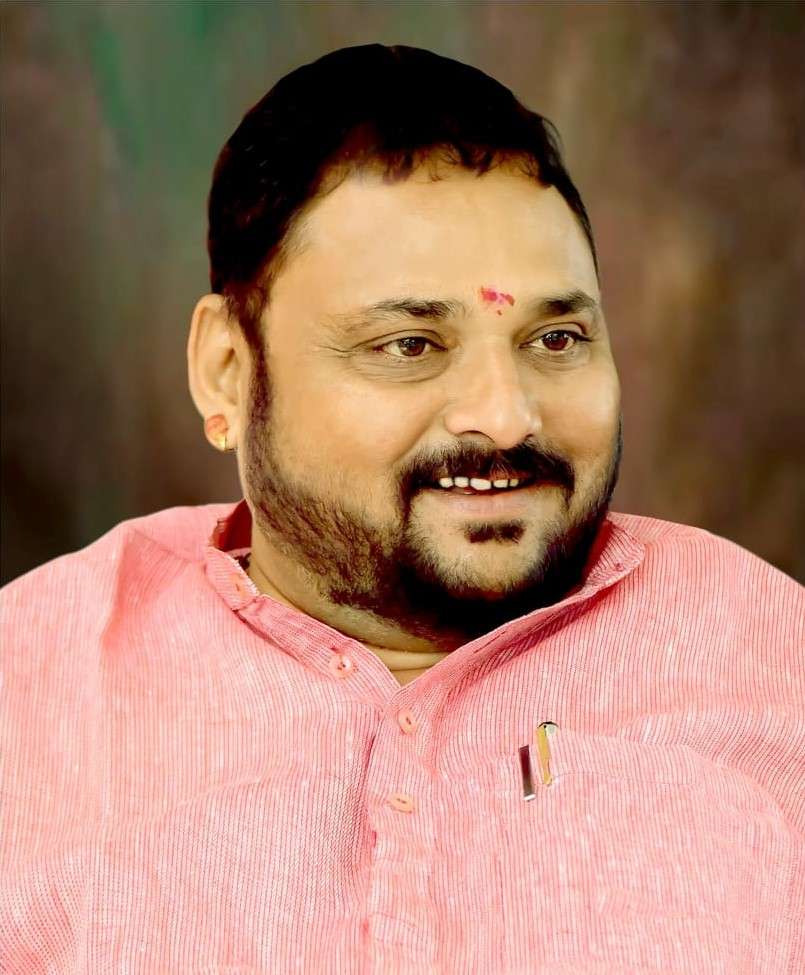
- Incumbent Dr. Rajendra S. Patil (Yadravkar)
- Party: RSVA
- Alliance: NDA
- Elected year: 2024

Shirol Assembly constituency is one of the 288 Vidhan Sabha (legislative assembly) constituencies in Maharashtra state in western India.

== Overview ==
Shirol (constituency number 280) is one of the ten Vidhan Sabha constituencies located in Kolhapur district. This constituency covers the entire Shirol tehsil of this district.

Shirol is part of the Hatkanangle Lok Sabha constituency along with five other Vidhan Sabha segments, namely Shahuwadi, Hatkanangale and Ichalkaranji in Kolhapur district and Islampur and Shirala in Sangli district.

== Members of Legislative Assembly ==
Year	Member	Party
1952	Rajaram Bagade	Indian National Congress
1957	Satgonda Revgonda Patil	Independent
1962	Ratnappa Kumbhar	Indian National Congress
1967	Ratnappa Kumbhar	Indian National Congress
1972	Ratnappa Kumbhar	Indian National Congress
1978	Ratnappa Kumbhar	Indian National Congress
1980	Dinkarrao Yadav	Peasants and Workers Party
1985	Sarojinitai Khanjire	Indian National Congress
1990	Ratnappa Kumbhar	Indian National Congress
1995	Ratnappa Kumbhar	Indian National Congress
1999	Satgonda Revgonda Patil	Indian National Congress
2004	Raju Shetti	Independent
2009	Satgonda Revgonda Patil	Indian National Congress
2014	Ulhas Patil	Shiv Sena
2019	Rajendra Patil Yadravkar	Independent
2024	Rajendra Patil Yadravkar	Rajarshi Shahu Vikas Aghadi

== Election results ==
=== Assembly Election 2024 ===
2024 Maharashtra Legislative Assembly election : Shirol
Party	Candidate	Votes	%	±%
RSVA	Dr. Rajendra Patil Yadravkar	134,630	52.21%	New
INC	Ganpatrao Appasaheb Patil	93,814	36.38%	New
SWP	Ulhas Sambhaji Patil	25,010	9.70%	▼12.55
NOTA	None of the Above	1,289	0.50%	▼0.05
Margin of victory		40,816	15.83%	▲3.88
Turnout		259,133	78.59%	▲3.90
Total valid votes		257,844		
Registered electors		329,732		▲5.23
RSVA hold		Swing	▲13.54	

=== Assembly Election 2019 ===
2019 Maharashtra Legislative Assembly election : Shirol
Party	Candidate	Votes	%	±%
Independent	Dr. Rajendra Patil Yadravkar	90,038	38.67%	New
SS	Ulhas Sambhaji Patil	62,214	26.72%	▼4.84
SWP	Anil Alias Savkar Balu Madnaik	51,804	22.25%	▲0.63
JSS	Anilkumar Dinkarrao Yadav	14,776	6.35%	New
VBA	Sunil Ramchandra Khot	9,589	4.12%	New
Independent	Pramoddada Suresh Patil	2,821	1.21%	New
NOTA	None of the above	1,287	0.55%	▼0.03
Margin of victory		27,824	11.95%	▲3.02
Turnout		234,318	74.78%	▼3.62
Total valid votes		232,811		
Registered electors		313,330		▲8.56
Independent gain from SS		Swing	▲7.11	

=== Assembly Election 2014 ===
2014 Maharashtra Legislative Assembly election : Shirol
Party	Candidate	Votes	%	±%
SS	Ulhas Sambhaji Patil	70,809	31.56%	▲16.64
NCP	Dr. Rajendra Patil Yadravkar	50,776	22.63%	New
SWP	Savakar Madnaik	48,511	21.62%	▼15.30
INC	Appasaheb Alias Satgonda Revgonda Patil	48,066	21.42%	▼24.23
Independent	Kadale Suresh Mallu	2,580	1.15%	New
NOTA	None of the above	1,291	0.58%	New
Margin of victory		20,033	8.93%	▲0.19
Turnout		226,276	78.40%	▲4.50
Total valid votes		224,350		
Registered electors		288,630		▲13.16
SS gain from INC		Swing	▼14.09	

=== Assembly Election 2009 ===
2009 Maharashtra Legislative Assembly election : Shirol
Party	Candidate	Votes	%	±%
INC	Satgonda Revgonda Patil	85,941	45.65%	▲21.29
SWP	Ulhas Sambhaji Patil	69,495	36.92%	New
SS	Kurade Raju Annu	28,084	14.92%	▲8.11
BSP	Mane Shankarrao Krishnarao	2,452	1.30%	▼0.58
Independent	Bhandare Satish Bhagwan	2,280	1.21%	New
Margin of victory		16,446	8.74%	▼2.00
Turnout		188,507	73.90%	▼0.02
Total valid votes		188,252		
Registered electors		255,072		▲8.02
INC gain from Independent		Swing	▲10.55	

=== Assembly Election 2004 ===
2004 Maharashtra Legislative Assembly election : Shirol
Party	Candidate	Votes	%	±%
Independent	Raju Shetti	61,254	35.10%	New
INC	Magdum Rajanitai Vishwanath	42,507	24.36%	▼20.45
Independent	Patil Rajendra Shamrao Yadravakar	34,593	19.82%	New
SS	Bhau Alias Pundlik Krishna Jadhav	11,884	6.81%	▼12.63
Independent	Patil Diliprao Baburao	11,550	6.62%	New
JSS	Faruk Faijulkhan Pathan	8,109	4.65%	New
BSP	Prof. Mane Bhagwan Maruti	3,281	1.88%	New
Independent	Ramdas Bapuso Koli	1,348	0.77%	New
Margin of victory		18,747	10.74%	▼0.01
Turnout		174,548	73.92%	▲1.40
Total valid votes		174,526		
Registered electors		236,124		▲12.82
Independent gain from INC		Swing	▼9.71	

=== Assembly Election 1999 ===
1999 Maharashtra Legislative Assembly election : Shirol
Party	Candidate	Votes	%	±%
INC	Satgonda Revgonda Patil	65,174	44.81%	▼7.39
NCP	Anna Alias Shamrao Patil Yadravkar	49,540	34.06%	New
SS	Khot Anna Alies Mansingrao Shankarrao	28,270	19.44%	▲16.96
BBM	Anwar Chandan Jamadar	1,276	0.88%	New
Independent	Bhandare Devppanna Baburao	1,176	0.81%	New
Margin of victory		15,634	10.75%	▼5.22
Turnout		151,784	72.52%	▼8.47
Total valid votes		145,436		
Registered electors		209,299		▲1.70
INC hold		Swing	▼7.39	

=== Assembly Election 1995 ===
1995 Maharashtra Legislative Assembly election : Shirol
Party	Candidate	Votes	%	±%
INC	Dr. Ratnappa Bharamappa Kumbhar	85,533	52.20%	▼0.42
Independent	Shamrao Patil (Yadravkar) Alias Shamgonda Babgonda Patil	59,365	36.23%	New
CPI	K. B. Dange	6,961	4.25%	New
JD	Nirmal Shankarrao Bala	5,153	3.14%	New
SS	Ghorpade Nivruti Baburao	4,058	2.48%	▼2.12
Margin of victory		26,168	15.97%	▲1.41
Turnout		166,671	80.99%	▲3.13
Total valid votes		163,848		
Registered electors		205,797		▲17.48
INC hold		Swing	▼0.42	

=== Assembly Election 1990 ===
1990 Maharashtra Legislative Assembly election : Shirol
Party	Candidate	Votes	%	±%
INC	Dr. Ratnappa Bharamappa Kumbhar	71,081	52.62%	▼0.72
Independent	Shamgonda Kalgonda Patil	51,415	38.06%	New
SS	Vilas Shripati Ugale	6,209	4.60%	New
PWPI	Dinkarrao Bhauso Yadav	4,424	3.27%	▼38.63
Independent	Appaso Annapa Bandgar	1,057	0.78%	New
Margin of victory		19,666	14.56%	▲3.12
Turnout		136,393	77.86%	▲9.21
Total valid votes		135,084		
Registered electors		175,176		▲28.91
INC hold		Swing	▼0.72	

=== Assembly Election 1985 ===
1985 Maharashtra Legislative Assembly election : Shirol
Party	Candidate	Votes	%	±%
INC	Khanjire Sarojani Babasaheb	49,103	53.34%	New
PWPI	Yadav Dinkarrao Bhausaheb	38,571	41.90%	▼9.07
Independent	Jamadar Anwar Chandan	3,655	3.97%	New
Margin of victory		10,532	11.44%	▲8.49
Turnout		93,290	68.65%	▼8.15
Total valid votes		92,049		
Registered electors		135,891		▲13.00
INC gain from PWPI		Swing	▲2.37	

=== Assembly Election 1980 ===
1980 Maharashtra Legislative Assembly election : Shirol
Party	Candidate	Votes	%	±%
PWPI	Yadav Dinkarrao Bhausaheb	46,288	50.97%	▲14.53
INC(I)	Dr. Ratnappa Bharamappa Kumbhar	43,610	48.02%	New
Margin of victory		2,678	2.95%	▼11.33
Turnout		92,357	76.80%	▼5.68
Total valid votes		90,819		
Registered electors		120,253		▲11.76
PWPI gain from INC		Swing	▲0.25	

=== Assembly Election 1978 ===
1978 Maharashtra Legislative Assembly election : Shirol
Party	Candidate	Votes	%	±%
INC	Dr. Ratnappa Bharamappa Kumbhar	44,205	50.72%	▼24.38
PWPI	Yadav Dinkarrao Bhausaheb	31,756	36.44%	New
JP	Nimbalkar Rajsingh Appaseheb Alias Bantiraje Khardekar	10,675	12.25%	New
Margin of victory		12,449	14.28%	▼38.27
Turnout		88,743	82.48%	▲1.81
Total valid votes		87,148		
Registered electors		107,595		▲4.48
INC hold		Swing	▼24.38	

=== Assembly Election 1972 ===
1972 Maharashtra Legislative Assembly election : Shirol
Party	Candidate	Votes	%	±%
INC	Dr. Ratnappa Bharamappa Kumbhar	61,330	75.10%	▲23.29
SSP	Jadhav S. Rao Ganpatrao	18,412	22.55%	New
ABJS	Kore Shankarrao Shivling	1,923	2.35%	New
Margin of victory		42,918	52.55%	▲48.67
Turnout		83,074	80.67%	▼6.91
Total valid votes		81,665		
Registered electors		102,979		▲19.51
INC hold		Swing	▲23.29	

=== Assembly Election 1967 ===
1967 Maharashtra Legislative Assembly election : Shirol
Party	Candidate	Votes	%	±%
INC	Dr. Ratnappa Bharamappa Kumbhar	37,897	51.81%	▼16.32
Independent	Satgonda Revgonda Patil	35,057	47.93%	New
Margin of victory		2,840	3.88%	▼37.10
Turnout		75,463	87.58%	▲1.18
Total valid votes		73,149		
Registered electors		86,167		▲19.66
INC hold		Swing	▼16.32	

=== Assembly Election 1962 ===
1962 Maharashtra Legislative Assembly election : Shirol
Party	Candidate	Votes	%	±%
INC	Ratnappa Bharamappa Kumbhar	40,986	68.13%	▲20.91
Independent	Satgonda Revgonda Patil	16,335	27.15%	New
PWPI	Imam Yakub Matwal	2,390	3.97%	New
Independent	Bhavarilal Devkaran Baladava	446	0.74%	New
Margin of victory		24,651	40.98%	▲37.90
Turnout		62,211	86.40%	▲8.80
Total valid votes		60,157		
Registered electors		72,007		▲17.29
INC gain from Independent		Swing	▲17.82	

=== Assembly Election 1957 ===
1957 Bombay State Legislative Assembly election : Shirol
Party	Candidate	Votes	%	±%
Independent	Patil Satgonda Ravagonda	23,965	50.31%	New
INC	Dr. Ratnappa Bharamappa Kumbhar	22,496	47.22%	▼8.03
Independent	Patil Sitaram Sakharam	1,177	2.47%	New
Margin of victory		1,469	3.08%	▼30.83
Turnout		47,638	77.60%	▲5.39
Total valid votes		47,638		
Registered electors		61,391		▲17.29
Independent gain from INC		Swing	▼4.94	

=== Assembly Election 1952 ===
1952 Bombay State Legislative Assembly election : Shirol
Party	Candidate	Votes	%	±%
INC	Bagade Rajaram Tukaram	20,883	55.25%	New
Socialist	Managave Jinnappa Lingappa	8,067	21.34%	New
PWPI	Yadav Dinkarrao Bhausaheb	7,403	19.59%	New
Independent	Kulkarni Malhar Dhondu	963	2.55%	New
Independent	Shah Devchand Uttamchand	483	1.28%	New
Margin of victory		12,816	33.91%	
Turnout		37,799	72.21%	
Total valid votes		37,799		
Registered electors		52,343		
INC win (new seat)				

== See also ==
- Shirol
- List of constituencies of Maharashtra Vidhan Sabha
