= Trombay Assembly constituency =

Constituency of the Maharashtra Legislative Assembly

Coordinates: 19.017°N 72.910°E

Trombay
- Former constituency for the Maharashtra Legislative Assembly

Constituency details
- Country: India
- Region: Western India
- State: Maharashtra
- Division: Konkan
- District: Mumbai Suburban
- Lok Sabha constituency: Mumbai North East
- Established: 1976
- Abolished: 2008
- Reservation: None

Trombay Assembly constituency was one of constituencies to Maharashtra Legislative Assembly. It was part of Mumbai North East Lok Sabha constituency. It existed from 1973 to 2008. It consisted of Wards 122—Anik Mahul, 124—Anushakti Nagar, 125—Subhash Nagar-Agarwadi and 126—Govandi NorthTrombay in Greater Bombay Municipal Corporation.

Till 1 October 1990 it was part of Bombay district. When Bombay district was bifurcated into Bombay City and Bombay Suburban districts it came under Bombay Suburban. In November 1995 the name Bombay was changed Mumbai.

== Members of the Legislative Assembly ==
Year	Member	Party
1978	S. Balakrishnan	Republican Party of India
1980	Lalita Rao	Indian National Congress (I)
1985	Javed Khan	Indian National Congress
1990	Javed Khan	Indian National Congress
1995	Ratnakar Narkar	Shiv Sena
1999	Sayed Sohail Ashraf	Indian National Congress
2004	Yusuf Mohamed Abrahani	Indian National Congress

== Election results ==
=== Assembly Election 2004 ===
2004 Maharashtra Legislative Assembly election : Trombay
Party	Candidate	Votes	%	±%
INC	Abrahani Yusuf Mohamed Hussain	115,823	52.69%	▲5.12
SS	Rahul Shewale	72,095	32.80%	▲1.73
SP	Sayed Ather Ali	6,622	3.01%	▼8.01
Independent	Afroz Abdul Razzak Mohammed	5,622	2.56%	New
BSP	Vidhyasagar Bhimrao Vidhyagar	5,509	2.51%	▲0.25
Independent	Amritsagar Bhau Ganapati	2,108	0.96%	New
Independent	Gautam Haribhau Tupere	1,707	0.78%	New
Margin of victory		43,728	19.89%	▲3.38
Turnout		219,804	44.95%	▼1.20
Total valid votes		219,804		
Registered electors		488,949		▲12.10
INC hold		Swing	▲5.12	

=== Assembly Election 1999 ===
1999 Maharashtra Legislative Assembly election : Trombay
Party	Candidate	Votes	%	±%
INC	Ashraf Sayed Sohail	95,783	47.58%	▲24.10
SS	Narkar Ratnakar Pandurang	62,547	31.07%	▼7.68
SP	Nasir Jamal	22,195	11.02%	▼10.62
Independent	Ravindra Pawar	6,166	3.06%	New
BSP	Deepak Ashok Sakpal	4,542	2.26%	New
RJD	Atique Ansari	2,017	1.00%	New
Independent	V. S. Gangadharan	2,011	1.00%	New
Margin of victory		33,236	16.51%	▲1.24
Turnout		201,321	46.16%	▼11.59
Total valid votes		201,319		
Registered electors		436,177		▲7.88
INC gain from SS		Swing	▲8.83	

=== Assembly Election 1995 ===
1995 Maharashtra Legislative Assembly election : Trombay
Party	Candidate	Votes	%	±%
SS	Narkar Ratnakar Pandurang	90,450	38.74%	▲0.60
INC	Javed Iqbal Khan	54,803	23.47%	▼32.62
SP	Sajid Rashid	50,530	21.64%	New
BBM	Avinash Mahatekar	16,960	7.26%	New
JD	Dalwi Husein Umar	6,964	2.98%	▼0.37
JP	Tavafique Khan	2,025	0.87%	New
Margin of victory		35,647	15.27%	▼2.68
Turnout		238,380	58.96%	▲1.58
Total valid votes		233,455		
Registered electors		404,307		▲30.34
SS gain from INC		Swing	▼17.35	

=== Assembly Election 1990 ===
1990 Maharashtra Legislative Assembly election : Trombay
Party	Candidate	Votes	%	±%
INC	Javed Iqbal Khan	97,715	56.09%	▲17.98
SS	Acharya Sharad Narayan	66,447	38.14%	New
JD	Malik Liyaqut Husain Ibarat Husain	5,839	3.35%	New
Republican Party of India (Balakrishnan)	S. Balakrishnan	1,082	0.62%	New
Margin of victory		31,268	17.95%	▲1.81
Turnout		176,831	57.01%	▲9.55
Total valid votes		174,204		
Registered electors		310,200		▲41.44
INC hold		Swing	▲17.98	

=== Assembly Election 1985 ===
1985 Maharashtra Legislative Assembly election : Trombay
Party	Candidate	Votes	%	±%
INC	Javed Iqbal Khan	38,965	38.12%	New
BJP	Mujumdar Saurabh Ramakant	22,466	21.98%	▼10.63
Independent	Amaranath W. Patil	15,460	15.12%	New
Independent	Gorhe Neelam Diwakar	14,805	14.48%	New
Independent	Mohamed Husein	5,679	5.56%	New
Independent	Prabhakar Ramnath Shanbag	1,236	1.21%	New
Independent	Anwar Sadat	1,101	1.08%	New
Margin of victory		16,499	16.14%	▲4.11
Turnout		103,741	47.30%	▲9.09
Total valid votes		102,230		
Registered electors		219,321		▲31.36
INC gain from INC(I)		Swing	▼6.52	

=== Assembly Election 1980 ===
1980 Maharashtra Legislative Assembly election : Trombay
Party	Candidate	Votes	%	±%
INC(I)	Lalita Rao	27,963	44.63%	▲25.63
BJP	Mujumdar Saurabh Ramakant	20,426	32.60%	New
INC(U)	Abu Bakar Mobin Khan	7,344	11.72%	New
RPI(K)	G. D. Chokshe	6,305	10.06%	▼19.32
Margin of victory		7,537	12.03%	▲10.27
Turnout		63,411	37.98%	▼18.53
Total valid votes		62,651		
Registered electors		166,967		▲15.43
INC(I) gain from RPI(K)		Swing	▲15.25	

=== Assembly Election 1978 ===
1978 Maharashtra Legislative Assembly election : Trombay
Party	Candidate	Votes	%	±%
RPI(K)	S. Balakrishnan	23,824	29.39%	New
SS	Patil Amarnath Vaman	22,399	27.63%	New
INC(I)	Lalita Rao	15,409	19.01%	New
RPI	R. G. Kharat	5,192	6.40%	New
Independent	Shaikh Shafi Maqbul	5,104	6.30%	New
PWPI	Shanbag Prabhakar Ramnath	2,313	2.85%	New
Independent	Barrister Khade V. D.	2,128	2.62%	New
Margin of victory		1,425	1.76%	
Turnout		82,887	57.30%	
Total valid votes		81,072		
Registered electors		144,645		
RPI(K) win (new seat)				

== See also ==
- List of constituencies of the Maharashtra Legislative Assembly
