= Prabha Rau =

Indian politician

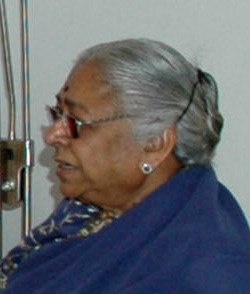
- Prabha Rau - Wasu

18th Governor of Rajasthan
- In office 2 December 2009 – 26 April 2010
- Preceded by: Shilendra Kumar Singh
- Succeeded by: Shivraj Patil

16th Governor of Himachal Pradesh
- In office 19 July 2008 – 24 January 2010
- Preceded by: Vishnu Sadashiv Kokje
- Succeeded by: Urmila Singh

Member of Parliament, Lok Sabha
- In office (1999–2004)
- Preceded by: Datta Meghe
- Succeeded by: Suresh Ganapat Wagmare
- Constituency: Wardha

Member of Maharashtra Legislative Assembly
- In office (1995–1999)
- Preceded by: Saroj Ravi Kashikar
- Succeeded by: Ranjit Kamble
- Constituency: Pulgaon
- In office (1985–1990)
- Preceded by: Manik Mahadeorao Sabane
- Succeeded by: Saroj Ravi Kashikar
- Constituency: Pulgaon
- In office (1972-1978), (1978 – 1980)
- Preceded by: N.R. Kale
- Succeeded by: Manik Mahadeorao Sabane
- Constituency: Pulgaon

President of Maharashtra Pradesh Congress Committee
- In office (1985-1988), (2004 – 2008)
- Preceded by: N. M. Kamble
- Succeeded by: Patangrao Kadam

Personal details
- Born: 4 March 1935 Khandwa district, Madhya Pradesh
- Died: 26 April 2010 (aged 75) New Delhi, India
- Spouse: S Anand Rau
- Children: 2
- Relatives: Ranjit Kamble (nephew)

Prabha Rau (4 March 1935 – 26 April 2010) was an Indian politician and the Governor of Rajasthan state of India when she died. She was appointed Governor of Rajasthan after she was transferred from Governor of Himachal Pradesh after Urmila Singh took charge on 25 Jan 2010 at Shimla. Initially following the death of previous governor of Rajasthan S.K. Singh, she got additional charge as Governor of Rajasthan along with charge of Governor of Himachal Pradesh. She was the governor of Himachal Pradesh since 19 July 2008. She was the former president of Maharashtra Pradesh Congress Committee. She hailed from Wardha. She has a brother named Arun Wasu.

She was Member of Parliament in 13th Lok Sabha and was elected from Wardha (Lok Sabha constituency) in Maharashtra. She was elected to Maharashtra Legislative Assembly in 1972 from Pulgaon for the first time.

She was a former athlete and had represented Maharashtra in the long jump, high jump, hurdles, discus throw, and running. She was a musician and held a master's degree in Politics and Music.

Rau died on 26 April 2010 after suffering a heart attack in the Jodhpur house in New Delhi. She became the second Governor of Rajasthan in a row to die in office.

Government offices
Preceded by Vishnu Sadashiv Kokje	Governor of Himachal Pradesh; 2008–2010	Succeeded by Urmila Singh
