= Pulgaon =

Pulgaon Bridgetown
- town
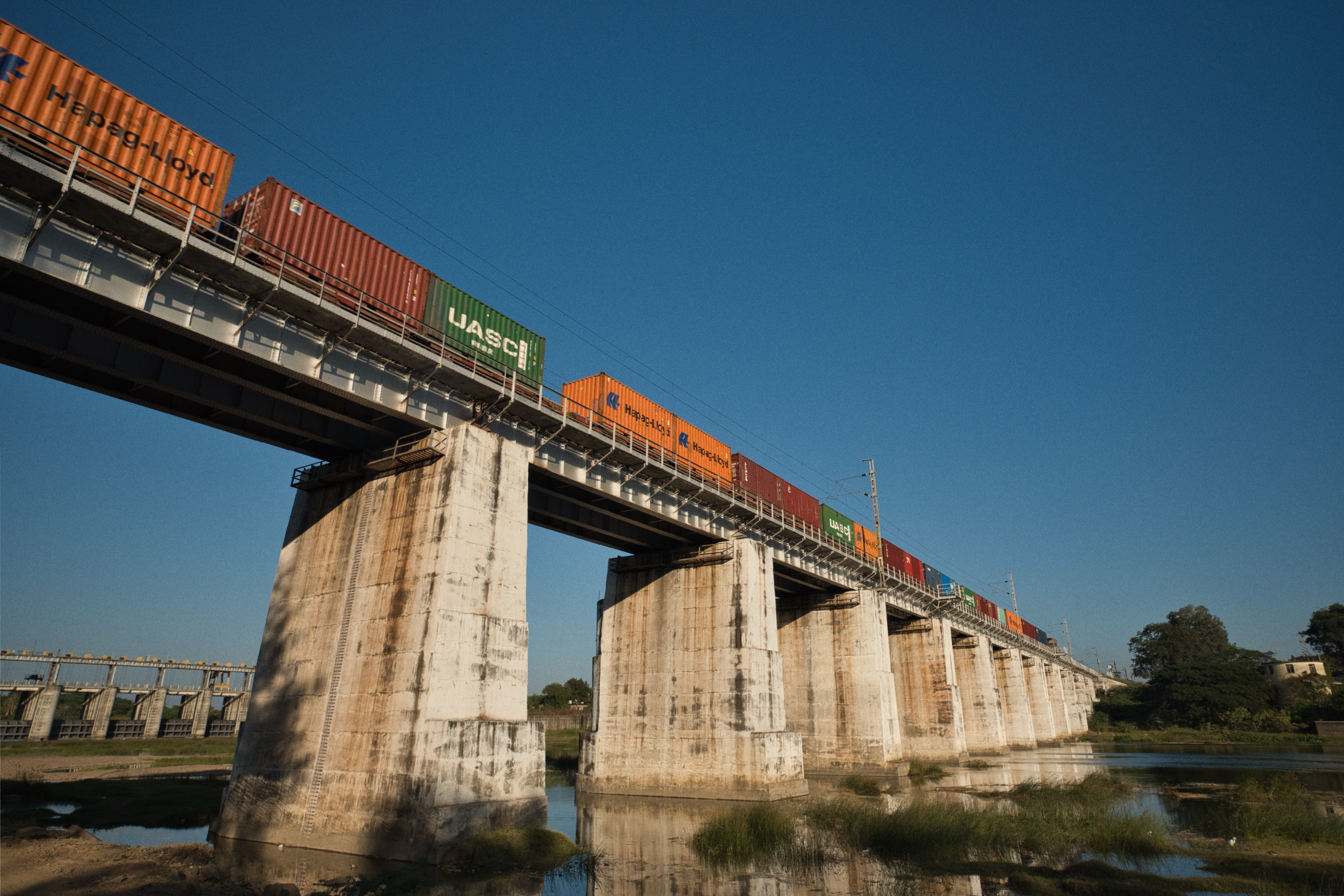
- Pulgaon train bridge

- Location in Maharashtra, India
- Coordinates: 20.726°N 78.317°E
- Country: India
- State: Maharashtra
- Region: Vidarbha
- District: Wardha

Government
  - Type: Municipal Council
  - Body: Pulgaon Municipal Council
- Elevation: 285 m (935 ft)

Population (2011)
  - Total: 33,925 (Note: According to the Census Organization of India. See Pulgaon population 2011.)
  - Density: 959/km^{2} (2,480/sq mi)
- Demonym(s): Pulgaonkar, Bridgetowner

Languages
  - Official: Marathi
- Time zone: UTC+5:30 (IST)
- PIN: 442302 (town) * 442303 (CAD)
- Telephone code: 91-7158
- Vehicle registration: MH32 (Wardha District)
- Website: www.collectorwardha.nic.in

Pulgaon is a municipal council in Wardha district in the India state of Maharashtra. The nearest city is Wardha, 32 kilometres (20 mi) away via the Mumbai–Nagpur Expressway.

== History ==
Pulgaon was created as a municipality in 1901 (Note: The Census Handbook of the Wardha district instead gives the year as 1902.) and has an area of 14 km^{2} (5.3 sq mi) under its jurisdiction. The old town lies south of the railway station and is relatively new; it grew from a collection of hutments of workers employed for the nearby railway bridge over the Wardha river. It is therefore unofficially called "Bridgetown" (from Marathi: पुल, romanized: pul, lit. 'bridge' and Marathi: गाव, romanized: gaon, lit. 'village/town'). The town's rapid rise in importance was partially due to its favorable position in the center of a cotton-growing area.

The town is built on rocky soil and derives its water supply mainly from the Wardha river, and more recently, from wells. In dry years, water scarcity has occurred.

In 2005, Pulgaon was a B-grade municipal council, with boundary limits of 5.29 square miles (13.7 km^{2}). Like many small towns across India, Pulgaon's limits have been expanded and the majority of the population are actually legally within either Nachangaon or Gunjkheda.

== Demographics ==
=== Religious places ===
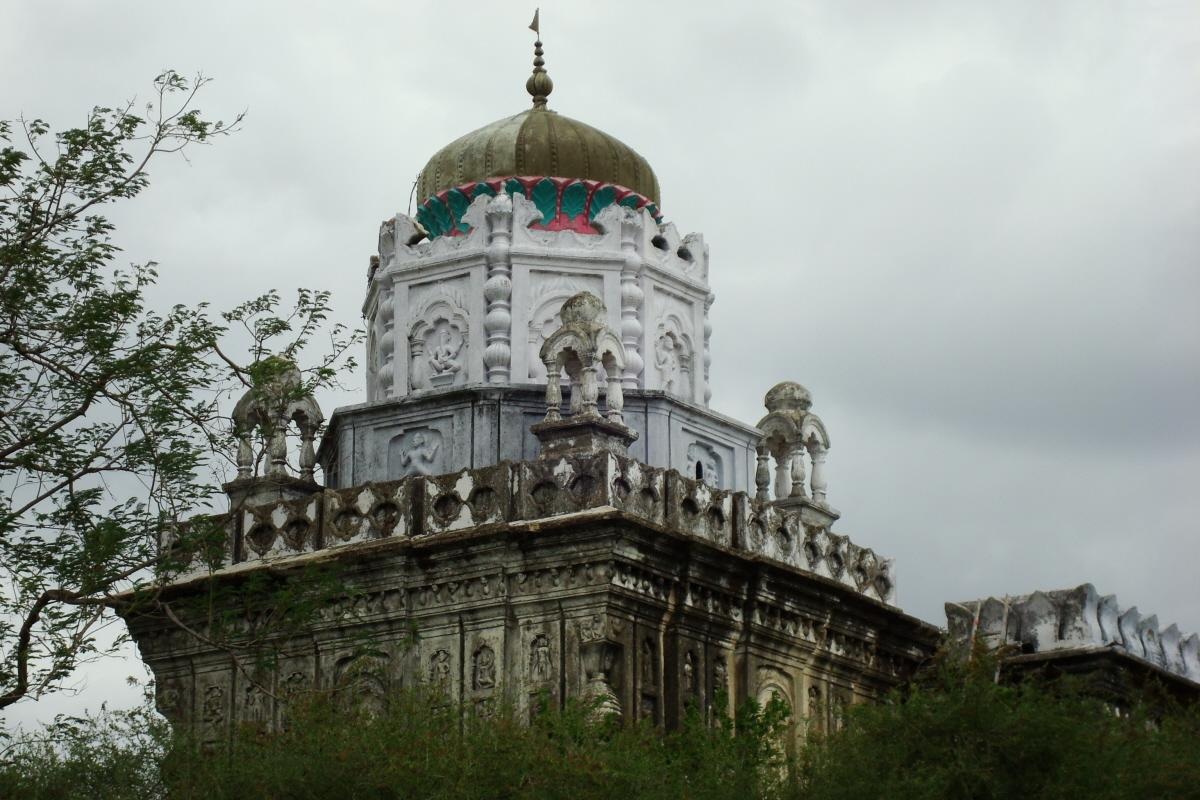
Shiva temple, Panchadhara

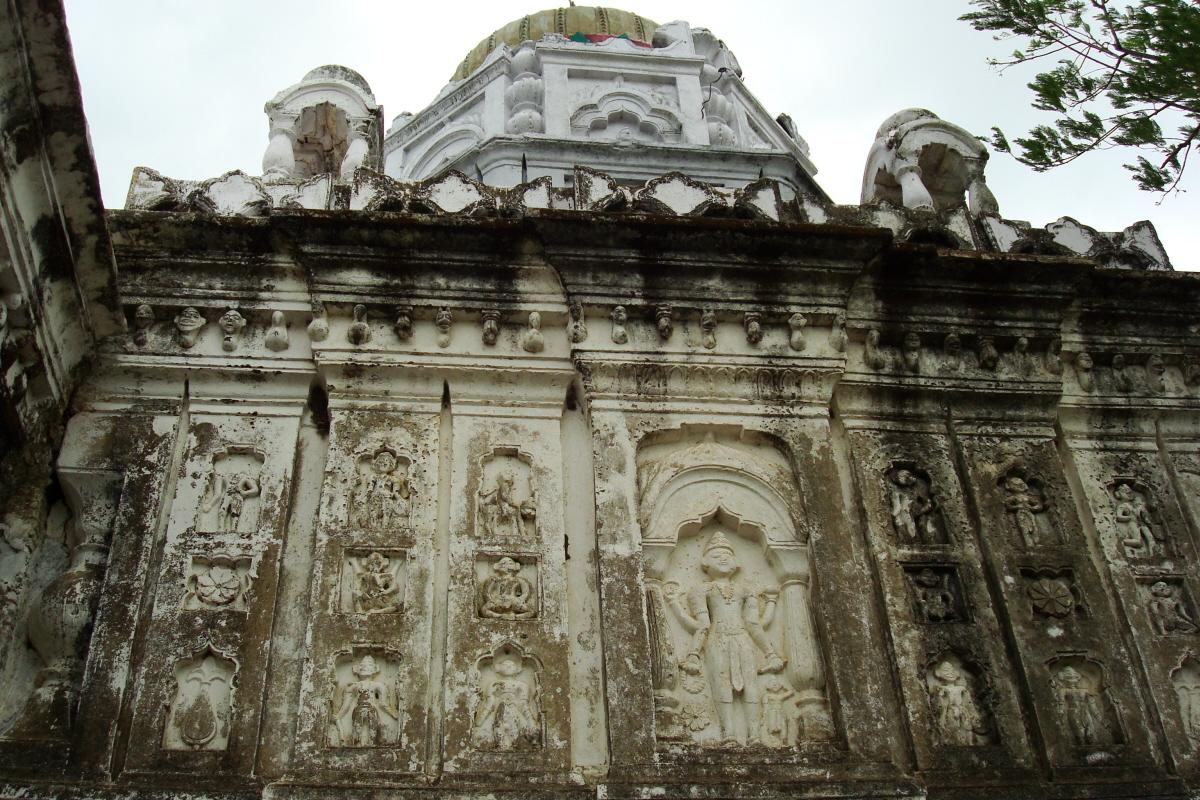
Shiva temple, Panchadhara

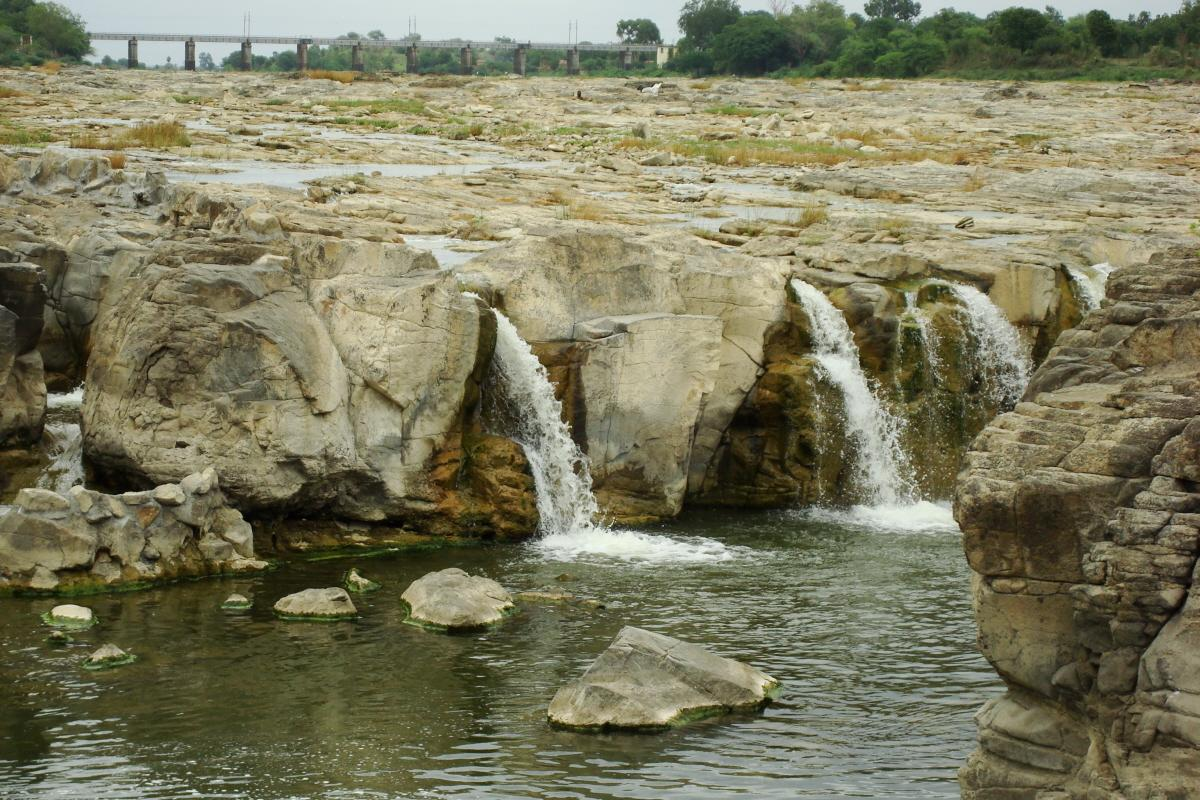
Panchadhara point

Pulgaon has places of worship representing Hinduism, Buddhism, Sikhism, Jainism, Christianity, and Islam.

The major Hindu temples in the town are of Madan Mohan, Balaji, Shiva, Hanuman, Ram, Datta, Bhavani-Mata, Katheen-Mata, Bhairav-Baba, and Vitthal. The Bhavani temple was the first temple built in Pulgaon. The Balaji temple is reported to be 80 years old and is looked after by a trust. The Shiva temple at Panchadhara is one of the oldest too. The temple of Madan Mohan Vallabh Sampraday Haveli was built approximately 110 years ago by Ishwardasji Mohata. Madan Mohanji (Krishna), Shyaminiji (Radha), and Laddu Gopal in Astha Dhatu are celebrated there. Datta Mandir, which is very ancient, was built by Shrimati Bramhlin Santinbai.

The town's Buddhist temple contains a bronze bust of the Buddha, reported to have been brought from Thailand. The temple has a spacious sabhamandap (Marathi: सभामंडप, lit. 'auditorium'), and was built by the neo-Buddhists of Pulgaon.

The town's Jain temple is one of the oldest temples and is the only Jain temple in the region. The "Mahavir Jayanti Utsav" is celebrated every year, with a huge procession through the town.

| Year | Male | Female | Total Population | Change | Religion (%) | | | | | | | |
| Year | Male | Female | Total Population | Change | Hindu | Muslim | Christian | Sikhs | Buddhist | Jain | Other religions and persuasions | Religion not stated |
|---|---|---|---|---|---|---|---|---|---|---|---|---|
| 2001 | 18978 | 17544 | 36522 | - | 62.962 | 8.556 | 0.528 | 0.244 | 26.335 | 1.358 | 0.000 | 0.016 |
| 2011 | 17573 | 16352 | 33925 | -7.111 | 62.388 | 11.163 | 0.584 | 0.336 | 24.212 | 1.259 | 0.027 | 0.032 |

=== Education ===
Pulgaon as the Jr. & Sr. Colleges of all the streams viz., Science, Commerce, & Arts.

The R. K. High School & Jr. College is the top-ranked school in town and the oldest. Additional high schools include the Aadarsh High School & Jr. College, Labour Camp High School, St. John High School, Central School, Dr. Zakir Hussain Urdu High School, and Lalitabai Muraka Girls High School and Jr. College.

Pulgaon is home to the Industrial Training Institute, Pulgaon, which was established in 1963 by the government of Maharashtra.

A town library is operated by the Siddharth Navyouvak library.

=== Sports ===
Established in 1952, the Liberty Club is a local sports club that coordinates most indoor games. Additionally, the club engages in social and cultural work. In 1961, it helped organize a mahila mandal, tailoring classes, and the construction of a vyayamshala (Marathi: व्यायामशाळा, lit. 'gymnasium'). Since 1962, it has also put out a weekly magazine called Shiv Prerana, in both Hindi and Marathi.

== Economy ==
Pulgaon is one of the leading cotton trade centers in the district. Pulgaon Cotton Mills, founded in 1890 by the British, is an old industry in central India. The Mill was closed by the state government in March 2003. The loss of this major source of income in the region put almost 2,000 families in trouble. Other industries include cotton ginning and pressing factories, hand-loom textiles, and BEC fertilizers.

=== Central Ammunition Depot ===
Located near Pulgaon is the Central Ammunition Depot, a military area and the second-largest ammunition depot in Asia. It was a place of minimal security risk until around 1999–2000. Following the September 11 attacks and the Indian parliament attack in 2001, the security of the area was increased, and all types of leisure activity in the area were stopped. Visiting Bhairav-Baba temple, which resides inside the premises, is strictly restricted due to security risks.

There are two schools inside this military area: Kendriya Vidyalaya, Pulgaon; and Army Primary School, Pulgaon. The students are primarily children of military personnel.

On 31 May 2016, a major fire broke out in the ammunition depot. At least 2 army and 18 DSC personnel were killed, and 19 more were injured.

=== Transportation ===
There is an Maharashtra State Road Transport Corporation (MSRTC) bus depot and workshop in Pulgaon. In 2007, it had a capacity of 38 buses. Cities and towns connected by buses to Pulgaon include Nagpur, Wardha, Gondia, Yavatmal, Akola, Amravati, Chandrapur, and Mahur.

Pulgaon railway station lies on the Howrah-Nagpur-Mumbai line, and is a major stop due to the nearby Central Ammunition Depot. A narrow-gauge railway line connected Pulgaon to Arvi; it is now abandoned.

== Municipal Council ==
The municipal council is composed of 19 elected councilors. A president is elected by the councilors from among themselves to preside over its meetings. In 1961–62, the total municipal receipts were ₹287,337 of which ₹112,347 came from municipal taxes.

The results of the 2016 Municipal Council elections are given in the following table:

| Party name | Party flag or symbol | Number of Corporators |
|---|---|---|
| Bharatiya Janata Party (BJP) | | 8 |
| Indian National Congress (INC) | | 2 |
| Bahujan Samaj Party (BSP) | | 5 |
| Nationalist Congress Party (NCP) | | 0 |
| Shiv Sena (SS) | | 0 |
| Maharashtra Navnirman Sena (MNS) | | 0 |
| Independents | | 3 |
