= List of villages in Mawal taluka =

Villages in Mawal taluka
- Tehsil
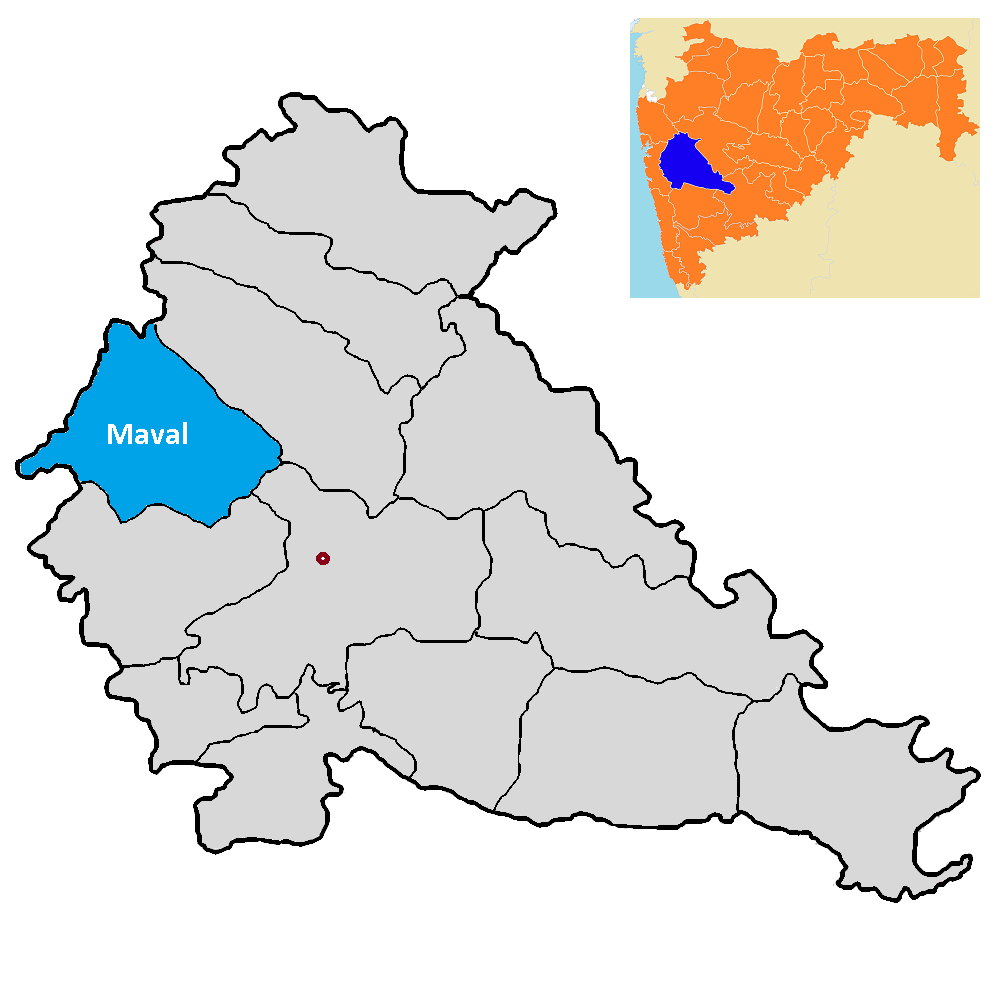
- Location of Mawal in Pune district in Maharashtra
- Country: India
- State: Maharashtra
- District: Pune district
- ISO 3166 code: ISO 3166-2:IN

Mawal taluka, whose name is also spelled as Maval, is an administrative area of Pune district, in the state of Maharashtra, India. At the time of the 2011 Census of India, it comprised 187 villages, a figure that was unchanged from 2001. Among those were the six uninhabited villages of Nandgaon, Jevare, Budhele, Pale Pawan Mawal, Shevati and Phagane.

== A ==
- Adavi
- Adhale Budruk
- Adhale Khurd
- Adhe Khurd
- Ahirvade
- Ajivali
- Akurdi
- Ambale
- Ambegaon
- Ambi
- Apati
- Atvan
- Aundhe Khurd
- Aundholi

== B ==
- Badhalawadi
- Baur
- Bebad Ohol
- Bedse
- Belaj
- Bhadawali
- Bhaje
- Bhajgaon
- Bhoyare
- Boraj
- Borivali
- Brahmanoli
- Brahman Wadi
- Brahmanwadi
- Budhavadi

== C ==
- Chandkhed
- Chavsar
- Chikhalse

== D ==
- Dahivali
- Dahuli
- Darumbare
- Deoghar
- Devale
- Devghar
- Dhalewadi
- Dhamane
- Dhangavhan
- Divad
- Done
- Dongargaon
- Dudhivare

== G ==
- Gahunje
- Gevhande Apati
- Gevhande Khadak
- Ghonshet
- Godumbare
- Govitri

== I ==
- Induri
- Inglun

== J ==
- Jadhavwadi
- Jambavade
- Jambhavali
- Jambhul
- Jovan

== K ==
- Kacharewadi
- Kadadhe
- Kadav
- Kale
- Kalhat
- Kambare Andar Mawal
- Kambare Nane Mawal
- Kamshet
- Kanhe
- Karandoli
- Karanjgaon
- Karla
- Karunj
- Kashal
- Katavi
- Keware
- Khadkale
- Khand
- Khandashi
- Kivale
- Kolechafesar
- Kondivade Andar Mawal
- Kondivade Nane Mawal
- Kothurne
- Kune Ansute
- Kune Nane Mawal
- Kurvande
- Kusavali
- Kusgaon Khurd
- Kusgaon Pawan Mawal
- Kusur

== L ==
- Lohagad
- Lonavala

== M ==
- Mahagaon
- Majgaon
- Malavandi Thule
- Malawali Nane Mawal
- Malawali Pawan Mawal
- Malegaon Budruk
- Malegaon Khurd
- Malewadi
- Mangarul
- Mau
- Mendhewadi
- Mohitewadi
- Moramarwadi
- Morave
- Mundhavare

== N ==
- Nagathali
- Nandgaon
- Nane
- Nanoli Nane Mawal
- Nanoli Tarf Chakan
- Navlakhumbre
- Nayagaon
- Nesave
- Nigade

== O ==
- Ovale
- Ozarde

== P ==
- Pachane
- Pale Nane Mawal
- Pangaloli
- Pansoli
- Parandvadi
- Paravadi
- Patan
- Pathargaon
- Pawalewadi
- Phalane
- Pimpal Khunte
- Pimpaloli
- Pimpari
- Prabhachiwadi
- Pusane

== R ==
- Rajpuri
- Rakaswadi
- Rasikwadi

== S ==
- Sadapur
- Sadavali
- Sai
- Salumbare
- Sangavade
- Sangavi
- Sangise
- Sate
- Sawale
- Sawantwadi
- Shilatane
- Shilimb
- Shindgaon
- Shirdhe
- Shire
- Shirgaon
- Shivali
- Shivane
- Somatane
- Somavadi
- Sudhavadi
- Sudumbare

== T ==
- Taje
- Takave Budruk
- Takave Khurd
- Talegaon Dabhade
- Thakursai
- Thoran
- Thugaon
- Tikona
- Tung

== U ==
- Udhewadi
- Ukasan
- Umbare Navalakh
- Urse

== V ==
- Vadavali
- Vadeshwar
- Vadivale
- Vagheshwar
- Valakh
- Valavanti
- Varale
- Varsoli
- Varu
- Vaund
- Vehergaon
- Velhavali

== W ==
- Wahangaon
- Waksai

== Y ==
- Yelase
- Yelghol
