= Apati, Mawal =

Village in Maharashtra

Apati
- Village
- Location in Maharashtra, India Apati (India)
- Coordinates: 18.6876798°N 73.1663435°E
- Country: India
- State: Maharashtra
- District: Pune
- Tehsil: Mawal

Government
  - Type: Panchayati Raj
  - Body: Gram panchayat

Area
  - Total: 796.36 ha (1,967.8 acres)

Population (2011)
  - Total: 359
  - Density: 45.1/km^{2} (117/sq mi)
- Sex ratio 179/180 ♂/♀

Languages
  - Official: Marathi
  - Other spoken: Hindi
- Time zone: UTC+5:30 (IST)
- Pin code: 410405
- Telephone code: 02114
- ISO 3166 code: IN-MH
- Vehicle registration: MH-14
- Website: pune.nic.in

Apati is a village and gram panchayat in India, situated in Mawal taluka of Pune district in the state of Maharashtra. It encompasses an area of 796.36 ha (1,968 acres).

== Administration ==
The village is administrated by a sarpanch, an elected representative who leads a gram panchayat. At the time of the 2011 Census of India, the village was the headquarters for the eponymous gram panchayat, which also governed the villages of Atvan, Dudhivare and Gevhande Apati.

== Demographics ==
At the 2011 census, the village comprised 76 households. The population of 359 was split between 179 males and 180 females.

== See also ==
- List of villages in Mawal taluka
