= Dahivali =

Dahivali may refer to:

- Dahivali, Mawal, Pune, Maharashtra, India
- Dahivali, Ratnagiri, Maharashtra, India
