= Devale =

Devale may refer to:

== People ==
- Devale Ellis (born 1984), American football player

== Places ==
- Devale, Mawal, Pune district, Maharashtra, India
- Devale, Raigad, Maharashtra, India

== See also ==
- Deval, given name and surname
