= Inglun =

Village in Maharashtra

Inglun Ingalun
- Village
- Location in Maharashtra, India Inglun (India)
- Coordinates: 18.909797°N 73.5434244°E
- Country: India
- State: Maharashtra
- District: Pune
- Tehsil: Mawal

Government
  - Type: Panchayati Raj
  - Body: Gram panchayat

Area
  - Total: 1,483 ha (3,660 acres)

Population (2011)
  - Total: 506
  - Density: 34.1/km^{2} (88.4/sq mi)
- Sex ratio 246 /260 ♂/♀

Languages
  - Official: Marathi
  - Other spoken: Hindi
- Time zone: UTC+5:30 (IST)
- Pin code: 410405
- Telephone code: 02114
- ISO 3166 code: IN-MH
- Vehicle registration: MH-14
- Website: pune.nic.in

Inglun, also known as Ingalun, is a village and gram panchayat in India, situated in Mawal taluka of Pune district in the state of Maharashtra. It encompasses an area of 1,483 ha (3,665 acres). occupation of most of the people's in inglun is farming. The village is located close to Thokarwadi dam which is a good source of water for farmers. Inglun is also very famous for consistent rainfall every year.

== Administration ==
The village is administrated by a sarpanch, an elected representative who leads a gram panchayat. At the time of the 2011 Census of India, the village was the headquarters for the eponymous gram panchayat, which also governed the village of Kune Ansute.

== Demographics ==
At the 2011 census, the village comprised 101 households. The population of 506 was split between 246 males and 260 females.

== See also ==
- List of villages in Mawal taluka
