= Waksai =

Village in Maharashtra

- Village
- Country: India
- State: Maharashtra
- District: Pune
- Tehsil: Mawal

Government
  - Type: Panchayati Raj
  - Body: Gram panchayat

Area
  - Total: 402.58 ha (994.8 acres)

Population (2011)
  - Total: 2,511
  - Density: 623.7/km^{2} (1,615/sq mi)
- Sex ratio 1329 / 1182 ♂/♀

Languages
  - Official: Marathi
  - Other spoken: Hindi
- Time zone: UTC+5:30 (IST)
- Telephone code: 02114
- ISO 3166 code: IN-MH
- Vehicle registration: MH-14
- Website: pune.nic.in

Waksai is a village in Mawal taluka of Pune district in the state of Maharashtra, India. It encompasses an area of 402.58 ha (995 acres).

== Administration ==
The village is administrated by a sarpanch, an elected representative who leads a gram panchayat. In 2019, the village was itself the seat of a gram panchayat.

== Demographics ==
At the 2011 Census of India, the village comprised 526 households. The population of 2511 was split between 1329 males and 1182 females.

== See also ==
- List of villages in Mawal taluka
