= Apati =

Apati may refer to:

- Apati, Mawal, a village in Pune district, Maharashtra, India
- Apati, Ladakh, a village in Kargil district, Ladakh, India
- Apateu (Hungarian: Apáti), a commune in Arad County, Romania
- István Apáti (born 1978), Hungarian jurist and politician
