= Ozarde =

Village in Maharashtra

Ozarde Ozharde
- Village
- Location in Maharashtra, India Ozarde (India)
- Coordinates: 18.7085405°N 73.5970674°E
- Country: India
- State: Maharashtra
- District: Pune
- Tehsil: Mawal

Government
  - Type: Panchayati Raj
  - Body: Gram panchayat

Area
  - Total: 580.55 ha (1,434.6 acres)

Population (2011)
  - Total: 981
  - Density: 169/km^{2} (438/sq mi)
- Sex ratio 490 / 491 ♂/♀

Languages
  - Official: Marathi
  - Other spoken: Hindi
- Time zone: UTC+5:30 (IST)
- Pin code: 410405
- Telephone code: 02114
- ISO 3166 code: IN-MH
- Vehicle registration: MH-14
- Website: pune.nic.in

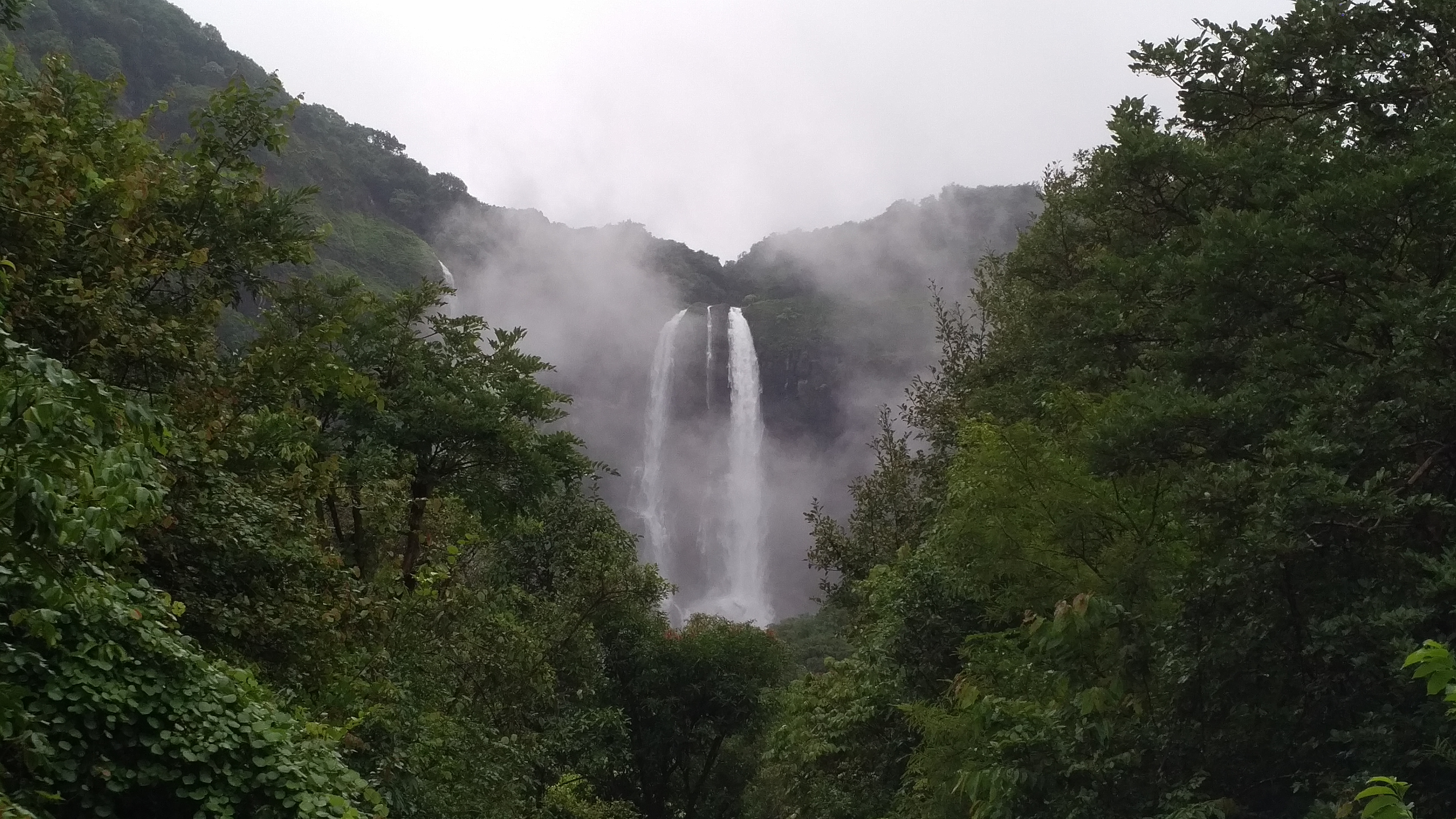
Ozarde Waterfalls; near Koyna Nagar in Maharashtra

Ozarde is a village and gram panchayat in India, situated in Mawal taluka of Pune district in the state of Maharashtra. It encompasses an area of 580.55 ha (1,435 acres).

== Administration ==
The village is administrated by a sarpanch, an elected representative who leads a gram panchayat. At the time of the 2011 Census of India, the village was a self-contained gram panchayat, meaning that there were no other constituent villages governed by the body.

== Demographics ==
At the 2011 census, the village comprised 165 households. The population of 981 was split between 490 males and 491 females.

== Air travel connectivity ==
The closest airport to the village is Pune Airport.

== See also ==
- List of villages in Mawal taluka
