= Somatane =

Village in Maharashtra

- Village
- Location in Maharashtra, India
- Coordinates: 18.695057°N 73.682170°E
- Country: India
- State: Maharashtra
- District: Pune
- Taluka: Maval (Mawal)

Government
  - Type: Panchayati Raj
  - Body: Gram panchayat

Area
  - Total: 434.04 ha (1,072.5 acres)
- Elevation: 616 m (2,021 ft)

Population (2011)
  - Total: 5,300
  - Density: 1,200/km^{2} (3,200/sq mi)
- Sex ratio 2715 / 2585 ♂/♀

Language
  - Official Language: Marathi
- Time zone: UTC+5:30 (IST)
- Area Code: 410 506
- Vehicle registration: MH 14
- Website: pune.nic.in

Somatane is an Indian village and gram panchayat located in Mawal taluka of Pune district, Maharashtra. It encompasses an area of 434.04 ha (1,073 acres).

== Administration ==
The village is administrated by a sarpanch, an elected representative who leads a gram panchayat. At the time of the 2011 Census of India, the village was a self-contained gram panchayat, meaning that there were no other constituent villages governed by the body.

== Demographics ==
At the 2011 census, the village comprised 1159 households. The population of 5300 was split between 2715 males and 2585 females.

== See also ==
- List of villages in Mawal taluka
