= Wahangaon =

Village in Maharashtra

Coordinates: 20°29′N 79°14′E

- Village
- Location in Maharashtra, India Wahangaon (India)
- Country: India
- State: Maharashtra
- District: Pune
- Tehsil: Mawal

Government
  - Type: Panchayati Raj
  - Body: Gram panchayat

Area
  - Total: 629 ha (1,550 acres)

Population (2011)
  - Total: 391
  - Density: 62.2/km^{2} (161/sq mi)
- Sex ratio 221 / 170 ♂/♀

Languages
  - Official: Marathi
  - Other spoken: Hindi
- Time zone: UTC+5:30 (IST)
- Telephone code: 02114
- ISO 3166 code: IN-MH
- Vehicle registration: MH-14
- Website: pune.nic.in

Wahangaon is a village in Mawal taluka of Pune district in the state of Maharashtra, India. It encompasses an area of 629 ha (1,554 acres).

== Administration ==
The village is administrated by a sarpanch, an elected representative who leads a gram panchayat. At the time of the 2011 Census of India, the gram panchayat governed four villages and was based at Dahuli.

== Demographics ==
At the 2011 census, the village comprised 71 households. The population of 391 was split between 221 males and 170 females.

== See also ==
- List of villages in Mawal taluka
