= Varu (Mawal) =

Village in Maharashtra

- Village
- Country: India
- State: Maharashtra
- District: Pune
- Tehsil: Mawal

Government
  - Type: Panchayati Raj
  - Body: Gram panchayat

Area
  - Total: 312.59 ha (772.4 acres)

Population (2011)
  - Total: 971
  - Density: 311/km^{2} (805/sq mi)
- Sex ratio 489 / 482 ♂/♀

Languages
  - Official: Marathi
  - Other spoken: Hindi
- Time zone: UTC+5:30 (IST)
- Telephone code: 02114
- ISO 3166 code: IN-MH
- Vehicle registration: MH-14
- Website: pune.nic.in

Varu is a village in Mawal taluka of Pune district in the state of Maharashtra, India. It encompasses an area of 312.59 ha (772 acres).

== Administration ==
The village is administrated by a sarpanch, an elected representative who leads a gram panchayat. In 2019, the village was not itself listed as a seat of a gram panchayat, meaning that the local administration was shared with one or more other villages.

== Demographics ==
At the 2011 Census of India, the village comprised 143 households. The population of 971 was split between 489 males and 482 females.

== See also ==
- List of villages in Mawal taluka
