= Gevhande Khadak =

Village in Maharashtra

- Village
- Location in Maharashtra, India Gevhande Khadak (India)
- Coordinates: 18.6302601°N 73.4920139°E
- Country: India
- State: Maharashtra
- District: Pune
- Tehsil: Mawal

Government
  - Type: Panchayati Raj
  - Body: Gram panchayat

Area
  - Total: 285 ha (700 acres)

Population (2011)
  - Total: 279
  - Density: 97.9/km^{2} (254/sq mi)
- Sex ratio 130/149 ♂/♀

Languages
  - Official: Marathi
  - Other spoken: Hindi
- Time zone: UTC+5:30 (IST)
- Pin code: 410405
- Telephone code: 02114
- ISO 3166 code: IN-MH
- Vehicle registration: MH-14
- Website: pune.nic.in

Gevhande Khadak is a village in India, situated in Mawal taluka of Pune district in the state of Maharashtra. It encompasses an area of 285 ha (704 acres).

== Administration ==
The village is administrated by a sarpanch, an elected representative who leads a gram panchayat. At the time of the 2011 Census of India, the gram panchayat governed two villages and was based at Thakursai.

== Demographics ==
At the 2011 census, the village comprised 42 households. The population of 279 was split between 130 males and 149 females.

== Air travel connectivity ==
The closest airport to the village is Pune Airport.

== See also ==
- List of villages in Mawal taluka
