= Dahuli =

Village in Maharashtra

- Village
- Location in Maharashtra, India Dahuli (India)
- Coordinates: 18.8824197°N 73.4623603°E
- Country: India
- State: Maharashtra
- District: Pune
- Tehsil: Mawal

Government
  - Type: Panchayati Raj
  - Body: Gram panchayat

Area
  - Total: 579 ha (1,430 acres)

Population (2011)
  - Total: 296
  - Density: 51.1/km^{2} (132/sq mi)
- Sex ratio 154/142 ♂/♀

Languages
  - Official: Marathi
  - Other spoken: Hindi
- Time zone: UTC+5:30 (IST)
- Pin code: 410405
- Telephone code: 02114
- ISO 3166 code: IN-MH
- Vehicle registration: MH-14
- Website: pune.nic.in

Dahuli is a village and gram panchayat in India, situated in Mawal taluka of Pune district in the state of Maharashtra. It encompasses an area of 579 ha (1,431 acres).

== Administration ==
The village is administrated by a sarpanch, an elected representative who leads a gram panchayat. At the time of the 2011 Census of India, the village was the headquarters for the eponymous gram panchayat, which also governed the villages of Borivali, Vehergaon and Wahangaon.

== Demographics ==
At the 2011 census, the village comprised 59 households. The population of 296 was split between 154 males and 142 females.

== See also ==
- List of villages in Mawal taluka
