= Poladpur-Naneghol =

Village in Maharashtra

- village
- Interactive map of Poladpur-Naneghol
- Country: India
- State: Maharashtra
- District: Raigad

Population
  - Total: 400−500

Languages
  - Official: Marathi
- Time zone: UTC+5:30 (IST)
- PIN: 402303
- Vehicle registration: MH06
- Nearest city: Mahad Poladpur
- Lok Sabha constituency: Raigad
- Vidhan Sabha constituency: Mahad

Poladpur-Naneghol is a small village in Raigad District, Maharashtra, India.

== Demographics ==
The village is located in the hills of the Sahyadri mountain range. It is 1 km from the holy river Savitri and Historic temple Shiva. The population of the village is just under 500. Falane, Gole, Dabhekar, Chandivkar, Salvi, Shelar, Renose, Varvatkar, Bawalekar, Utekar, Jangam, and Jadhav are the main families in the village.

== Geography ==
Naneghol is 180 kilometres (110 mi) from Mumbai, 140 kilometres (87 mi) from the district head office at Alibag, and 13 kilometres (8.1 mi) from the Tehsil office at Poladpur.

The village has three neighborhoods called Varche, Madhale, and Khalche Awhad. Recently, Katkar wadi National Tribes which is 2 km away from the village, was attached to the village.

The Pratapgad and Javali Forest are nearby. Mahabaleshwar is also very close to the village.

== Economy ==
The people of the village are very simple and hard working. The main occupation is farming, which is dependent on the monsoon rains that fall in June to September every year. The average rainfall in Naneghol and surrounding areas is approximately 5,000 to 5,500 mm from June to October every year. The main crop is rice. Other products include nachani (millet), vari (coix barbata), and vegetables for their own use. There are many mangos, jackfruit, and corinda trees around the village.

== Religion and temples ==
Villagers believe in parampara and are Varkari followers of Jñāneśvar, Tukaram, Namdev, Janabai. Vithoba and Ganesha are the most popular deities.

There is one temple in the centre of the village. Ganesha, Hanuman, and Jñāneśvar statues are in the temple. Villagers worship for seven days in a performance called Harinam Saptah in the Krishna Paksha of the month of Mārgaśīrṣa according to the Hindu calendar.

Holi, Gaṇēśa Caturthī, Navratri, and Tulsi Vivah are the chief festivals of the village.

== Facilities ==
The village has a primary school up to class four. After finishing their primary education, the children go to Narvir Tanaji Malusare Vidhyalaya in Devale, which is 2 km from the village.
