= Ghonshet =

Village in Maharashtra

- Village
- Location in Maharashtra, India Ghonshet (India)
- Coordinates: 18.8218119°N 73.514741°E
- Country: India
- State: Maharashtra
- District: Pune
- Tehsil: Mawal

Government
  - Type: Panchayati Raj
  - Body: Gram panchayat

Area
  - Total: 369.77 ha (913.7 acres)

Population (2011)
  - Total: 1,328
  - Density: 359.1/km^{2} (930.2/sq mi)
- Sex ratio 681/647 ♂/♀

Languages
  - Official: Marathi
  - Other spoken: Hindi
- Time zone: UTC+5:30 (IST)
- Pin code: 410405
- Telephone code: 02114
- ISO 3166 code: IN-MH
- Vehicle registration: MH-14
- Website: pune.nic.in

Ghonshet is a village and gram panchayat in India, situated in Mawal taluka of Pune district in the state of Maharashtra. It encompasses an area of 369.77 ha (914 acres).

== Administration ==
The village is administrated by a sarpanch, an elected representative who leads a gram panchayat. At the time of the 2011 Census of India, the village was the headquarters for the eponymous gram panchayat, which also governed the villages of Kacharewadi and Vaund.

== Demographics ==
At the 2011 census, the village comprised 236 households. The population of 1328 was split between 681 males and 647 females.

== Air travel connectivity ==
The closest airport to the village is Pune Airport.

== See also ==
- List of villages in Mawal taluka
