= Jambavade =

Village in Maharashtra

- Village
- Location in Maharashtra, India Jambavade (India)
- Coordinates: 18.5192746°N 73.8505322°E
- Country: India
- State: Maharashtra
- District: Pune
- Tehsil: Mawal

Government
  - Type: Panchayati Raj
  - Body: Gram panchayat

Area
  - Total: 311.78 ha (770.4 acres)

Population (2011)
  - Total: 784
  - Density: 251/km^{2} (651/sq mi)
- Sex ratio 399 /385 ♂/♀

Languages
  - Official: Marathi
  - Other spoken: Hindi
- Time zone: UTC+5:30 (IST)
- Pin code: 410405
- Telephone code: 02114
- ISO 3166 code: IN-MH
- Vehicle registration: MH-14
- Website: pune.nic.in

Jambavade is a village in India, situated in Mawal taluka of Pune district in the state of Maharashtra. It encompasses an area of 311.78 ha (770 acres).

== Administration ==
The village is administrated by a sarpanch, an elected representative who leads a gram panchayat. In 2019, the village was itself the seat of a gram panchayat.

== Demographics ==
At the 2011 Census of India, the village comprised 136 households. The population of 784 was split between 399 males and 385 females.

== See also ==
- List of villages in Mawal taluka
