= Divad =

Village in Maharashtra

- Village
- Location in Maharashtra, India Divad (India)
- Coordinates: 18.5360252°N 73.7207848°E
- Country: India
- State: Maharashtra
- District: Pune
- Tehsil: Mawal

Government
  - Type: Panchayati Raj
  - Body: Gram panchayat

Area
  - Total: 730 ha (1,800 acres)

Population (2011)
  - Total: 1,626
  - Density: 220/km^{2} (580/sq mi)
- Sex ratio 821/805 ♂/♀

Languages
  - Official: Marathi
  - Other spoken: Hindi
- Time zone: UTC+5:30 (IST)
- Pin code: 410405
- Telephone code: 02114
- ISO 3166 code: IN-MH
- Vehicle registration: MH-14
- Website: pune.nic.in

Divad is a village and gram panchayat in India, situated in Mawal taluka of Pune district in the state of Maharashtra that encompasses an area of 730 ha (1,804 acres).

== Administration ==
The village is administrated by a sarpanch, an elected representative who leads a gram panchayat. At the time of the 2011 Census of India, the village was a self-contained gram panchayat, meaning that there were no other constituent villages governed by the body.

== Demographics ==
At the 2011 census, the village comprised 279 households. The population of 1626 was split between 821 males and 805 females.

== Air travel connectivity ==
The closest airport to the village is Pune Airport.

== See also ==
- List of villages in Mawal taluka
