= Kothurne =

Village in Maharashtra

- Village
- Location in Maharashtra, India Kothurne (India)
- Coordinates: 18.6723994°N 73.5035026°E
- Country: India
- State: Maharashtra
- District: Pune
- Tehsil: Mawal

Government
  - Type: Panchayati Raj
  - Body: Gram panchayat

Area
  - Total: 353.70 ha (874.0 acres)

Population (2011)
  - Total: 1,343
  - Density: 379.7/km^{2} (983.4/sq mi)
- Sex ratio 699/644 ♂/♀

Languages
  - Official: Marathi
  - Other spoken: Hindi
- Time zone: UTC+5:30 (IST)
- Pin code: 410405
- Telephone code: 02114
- ISO 3166 code: IN-MH
- Vehicle registration: MH-14
- Website: pune.nic.in

Kothurne is a village and gram panchayat in India, situated in Mawal taluka of Pune district in the state of Maharashtra, encompasses an area of 353.70 ha (874 acres).

== Administration ==
The village is administrated by a sarpanch, an elected representative who leads a gram panchayat. At the time of the 2011 Census of India, the village was a self-contained gram panchayat, meaning that there were no other constituent villages governed by the body.

== Demographics ==
At the 2011 census, the village comprised 239 households. The population of 1343 was split between 699 males and 644 females.

== Air travel connectivity ==
The closest airport to the village is Pune Airport.

== See also ==
- List of villages in Mawal taluka
