= Yelghol =

Village in Maharashtra

- Village
- Location in Maharashtra, India Yelghol (India)
- Coordinates: 18.659°N 73.553°E
- Country: India
- State: Maharashtra
- District: Pune
- Tehsil: Mawal

Government
  - Type: Panchayati Raj
  - Body: Gram panchayat

Area
  - Total: 477.94 ha (1,181.0 acres)

Population (2011)
  - Total: 877
  - Density: 183/km^{2} (475/sq mi)
- Sex ratio 447 / 430 ♂/♀

Languages
  - Official: Marathi
  - Other spoken: Hindi
- Time zone: UTC+5:30 (IST)
- Telephone code: 02114
- ISO 3166 code: IN-MH
- Vehicle registration: MH-14
- Website: pune.nic.in

Yelghol is a village in Mawal taluka of Pune district in the state of Maharashtra, India. It encompasses an area of 477.94 ha (1,181 acres).

== Administration ==
The village is administrated by a sarpanch, an elected representative who leads a gram panchayat. In 2019, the village was itself the seat of a gram panchayat.

== Demographics ==
At the 2011 Census of India, the village comprised 129 households. The population of 877 was split between 477 males and 430 females.

== See also ==
- List of villages in Mawal taluka
