= Bhatkar (surname) =

Bhatkar (Marathi: भाटकर) is a Marathi surname. Notable people with the name include:

- Laxman Shrawan Bhatkar (1901–70), Indian social worker
- Ramesh Bhatkar (1949–2019), Indian Marathi and Bollywood actor
- Snehal Bhatkar (1919–2007; born Vasudev Gangaram Bhatkar), Indian film music composer
- Vijay P. Bhatkar (born 1946), Indian computer scientist and educationalist
