= Adhale Khurd =

Village in Maharashtra, India

- Village
- Location in Maharashtra, India Adhale Khurd (India)
- Coordinates: 18.6506569°N 73.6200392°E
- Country: India
- State: Maharashtra
- District: Pune
- Tehsil: Mawal

Government
  - Type: Panchayati Raj
  - Body: Gram panchayat

Area
  - Total: 744 ha (1,840 acres)

Population (2011)
  - Total: 1,773
  - Density: 238/km^{2} (617/sq mi)
- Sex ratio 917/856 ♂/♀

Languages
  - Official: Marathi
  - Other spoken: Hindi
- Time zone: UTC+5:30 (IST)
- Pin code: 410405
- Telephone code: 02114
- ISO 3166 code: IN-MH
- Vehicle registration: MH-14
- Website: pune.nic.in

Adhale Khurd is a village and gram panchayat in India, situated in Mawal taluka of Pune district in the state of Maharashtra. It encompasses an area of 744 ha (1,838 acres). It is situated near National Highway 4.

== Administration ==
The village is administrated by a sarpanch, an elected representative who leads a gram panchayat. At the time of the 2011 Census of India, the village was a self-contained gram panchayat, meaning that there were no other constituent villages governed by the body.

== Demographics ==
At the 2011 census, the village comprised 317 households. The population of 1773 was split between 917 males and 856 females.

== See also ==
- List of villages in Mawal taluka
