= Thakursai =

Village in Maharashtra

- Village
- Location in Maharashtra, India Thakursai (India)
- Coordinates: 18.6535915°N 73.4823065°E
- Country: India
- State: Maharashtra
- District: Pune
- Tehsil: Mawal

Government
  - Type: Panchayati Raj
  - Body: Gram panchayat

Area
  - Total: 264.22 ha (652.9 acres)

Population (2011)
  - Total: 335
  - Density: 127/km^{2} (328/sq mi)
- Sex ratio 168 / 167 ♂/♀

Languages
  - Official: Marathi
  - Other spoken: Hindi
- Time zone: UTC+5:30 (IST)
- Telephone code: 02114
- ISO 3166 code: IN-MH
- Vehicle registration: MH-14
- Website: pune.nic.in

Thakursai is a village and gram panchayat in India, situated in the Mawal taluka of Pune district in the state of Maharashtra. It encompasses an area of 264.22 ha (653 acres).

== Administration ==
The village is administrated by a sarpanch, an elected representative who leads a gram panchayat. At the time of the 2011 Census of India, the village was the headquarters for the eponymous gram panchayat, which also governed the village of Gevhande Khadak.

== Demographics ==
At the 2011 census, the village comprised 59 households. The population of 335 was split between 168 males and 167 females.

== See also ==
- List of villages in Mawal taluka
