= Brahmanoli =

Village in Maharashtra

- Village
- Location in Maharashtra, India Brahmanoli (India)
- Coordinates: 18.5204303°N 73.8567437°E
- Country: India
- State: Maharashtra
- District: Pune
- Tehsil: Mawal

Government
  - Type: Panchayati Raj
  - Body: Gram panchayat

Area
  - Total: 177 ha (440 acres)

Population (2011)
  - Total: 618
  - Density: 349/km^{2} (904/sq mi)
- Sex ratio 288/330 ♂/♀

Languages
  - Official: Marathi
  - Other spoken: Hindi
- Time zone: UTC+5:30 (IST)
- Pin code: 410405
- Telephone code: 02114
- ISO 3166 code: IN-MH
- Vehicle registration: MH-14
- Website: pune.nic.in

Brahmanoli is a village in India, situated in Mawal taluka of Pune district in the state of Maharashtra. It encompasses an area of 177 ha (437 acres).

== Administration ==
The village is administrated by a sarpanch, an elected representative who leads a gram panchayat. In 2019, the village was not itself listed as a seat of a gram panchayat, meaning that the local administration was shared with one or more other villages.

== Demographics ==
At the 2011 Census of India, the village comprised 120 households. The population of 618 was split between 288 males and 330 females.

== Air travel connectivity ==
The closest airport to the village is Pune Airport.

== See also ==
- List of villages in Mawal taluka
