= Lohgarh (disambiguation) =

Lohgarh (lit. 'Iron Fort') is a town in the Yamunanagar district of Haryana, India.

It may also refer to:

- Lohgarh, a village in the town of Zirakpur in the state of Punjab, India
- Lohgarh, Nakodar, a village in Nakodar, Jalandhar district, Punjab, India
- Lohgarh, Phillaur, a village in the Jalandhar district of Punjab, Punjab, India
- Lohgarh, one of several villages in Ludhiana West Tehsil, Ludhiana district, Punjab, India
- Lohgarh, former name of Gurdaspur, a city in Punjab, India

== See also ==
- Lohagarh Fort, Bharatpur, Rajasthan, India
- Lohagad, a fort in Maharashtra, India
- Lohagad, Mawal, a village in Maharashtra, India
