= Salumbare =

Village in Maharashtra, India

Salumbare Salumbre
- Village
- Country: India
- State: Maharashtra
- District: Pune
- Tehsil: Mawal

Government
  - Type: Panchayati Raj
  - Body: Gram panchayat

Area
  - Total: 377.22 ha (932.1 acres)

Population (2011)
  - Total: 1,397
  - Density: 370.3/km^{2} (959.2/sq mi)
- Sex ratio 697 / 700 ♂/♀

Languages
  - Official: Marathi
  - Other spoken: Hindi
- Time zone: UTC+5:30 (IST)
- Website: pune.nic.in

Salumbare is a village and gram panchayat in India, situated in the Mawal taluka of Pune district in the state of Maharashtra. It encompasses an area of 377.22 ha (932 acres).

== Administration ==
The village is administrated by a sarpanch, an elected representative who leads a gram panchayat. At the time of the 2011 Census of India, the village was a self-contained gram panchayat, indicating that there were no other constituent villages governed by the body.

== Demographics ==
At the 2011 census, the village comprised 299 households. The population of 1397 was split between 697 males and 700 females.

== See also ==
- List of villages in Mawal taluka
