= Yelase =

Village in Maharashtra

- Village
- Location in Maharashtra, India Yelase (India)
- Country: India
- State: Maharashtra
- District: Pune
- Tehsil: Mawal

Government
  - Type: Panchayati Raj
  - Body: Gram panchayat

Area
  - Total: 234.55 ha (579.6 acres)

Population (2011)
  - Total: 1,248
  - Density: 532.1/km^{2} (1,378/sq mi)
- Sex ratio 636 / 612 ♂/♀

Languages
  - Official: Marathi
  - Other spoken: Hindi
- Time zone: UTC+5:30 (IST)
- Telephone code: 02114
- ISO 3166 code: IN-MH
- Vehicle registration: MH-14
- Website: pune.nic.in

Yelase is a village in Mawal taluka of Pune district in the state of Maharashtra, India. It encompasses an area of 234.55 ha (580 acres).

== Administration ==
The village is administrated by a sarpanch, an elected representative who leads a gram panchayat. In 2019, the village was itself the seat of a gram panchayat.

== Demographics ==
At the 2011 Census of India, the village comprised 230 households. The population of 1248 was split between 636 males and 612 females.

== See also ==
- List of villages in Mawal taluka
