= Shilimb =

Village in Maharashtra

Shilimb Shilim
- Village
- Location in Maharashtra, India Shilimb (India)
- Coordinates: 18.6045917°N 73.3941015°E
- Country: India
- State: Maharashtra
- District: Pune
- Tehsil: Mawal

Government
  - Type: Panchayati Raj
  - Body: Gram panchayat

Area
  - Total: 1,221 ha (3,020 acres)

Population (2011)
  - Total: 1,122
  - Density: 91.89/km^{2} (238.0/sq mi)
- Sex ratio 577 / 545 ♂/♀

Languages
  - Official: Marathi
  - Other spoken: Hindi
- Time zone: UTC+5:30 (IST)
- Telephone code: 02114
- ISO 3166 code: IN-MH
- Vehicle registration: MH-14
- Website: pune.nic.in

Shilimb is a village in India, situated in the Mawal taluka of Pune district in the state of Maharashtra. It encompasses an area of 1,221 ha (3,017 acres).

== Administration ==
The village is administrated by a sarpanch, an elected representative who leads a gram panchayat. At the time of the 2011 Census of India, the village was the headquarters for the eponymous gram panchayat, which also governed the villages of Kadav and Vagheshwar.

== Demographics ==
At the 2011 census, the village comprised 199 households. The population of 1122 was split between 577 males and 545 females.

At that time, 632 of the people were literate, giving a literacy rate of 64.36 percent. The male literacy was 71.34 percent and that for females was 56.93 percent.

== See also ==
- List of villages in Mawal taluka
