= Sawale =

Village in Maharashtra

Sawale Sawala
- Village
- Location in Maharashtra, India Sawale (India)
- Coordinates: 18.9467897°N 73.4145519°E
- Country: India
- State: Maharashtra
- District: Pune
- Tehsil: Mawal

Government
  - Type: Panchayati Raj
  - Body: Gram panchayat

Area
  - Total: 1,301 ha (3,210 acres)

Population (2011)
  - Total: 1,002
  - Density: 77.02/km^{2} (199.5/sq mi)
- Sex ratio 501 /501 ♂/♀

Languages
  - Official: Marathi
  - Other spoken: Hindi
- Time zone: UTC+5:30 (IST)
- Telephone code: 02114
- ISO 3166 code: IN-MH
- Vehicle registration: MH-14
- Website: pune.nic.in

Sawale is a village and gram panchayat in India, situated in the Mawal taluka of Pune district in the state of Maharashtra. It encompasses an area of 1,301 ha (3,210 acres).

== Administration ==
The village is administrated by a sarpanch, an elected representative who leads a gram panchayat. At the time of the 2011 Census of India, the village was a self-contained gram panchayat, meaning that there were no other constituent villages governed by the body.

== Demographics ==
At the 2011 census, the village comprised 223 households. The population of 1002 was split between 501 males and 501 females.

== See also ==
- List of villages in Mawal taluka
