= Darumbare =

Village in Maharashtra

- Village
- Location in Maharashtra, India Darumbare (India)
- Coordinates: 18.6481344°N 73.6712149°E
- Country: India
- State: Maharashtra
- District: Pune
- Tehsil: Mawal

Government
  - Type: Panchayati Raj
  - Body: Gram panchayat

Area
  - Total: 649.10 ha (1,604.0 acres)

Population (2011)
  - Total: 1,736
  - Density: 267.4/km^{2} (692.7/sq mi)
- Sex ratio 893/843 ♂/♀

Languages
  - Official: Marathi
  - Other spoken: Hindi
- Time zone: UTC+5:30 (IST)
- Pin code: 410405
- Telephone code: 02114
- ISO 3166 code: IN-MH
- Vehicle registration: MH-14
- Website: pune.nic.in

Darumbare is a village and gram panchayat in India, situated in Mawal taluka of Pune district in the state of Maharashtra. It encompasses an area of 649.10 ha (1,604 acres). It is situated near National Highway 4.

== Administration ==
The village is administrated by a sarpanch, an elected representative who leads a gram panchayat. At the time of the 2011 Census of India, the village was a self-contained gram panchayat, meaning that there were no other constituent villages governed by the body.

== Demographics ==
At the 2011 census, the village comprised 344 households. The population of 1736 was split between 893 males and 843 females.

== See also ==
- List of villages in Mawal taluka
