= Tikona, Mawal =

Village in Maharashtra, India

Tikona
- Village
- Country: India
- State: Maharashtra
- District: Pune
- Tehsil: Mawal

Government
  - Type: Panchayati Raj
  - Body: Gram panchayat

Area
  - Total: 676.61 ha (1,671.9 acres)

Population (2011)
  - Total: 978
  - Density: 145/km^{2} (374/sq mi)
- Sex ratio 516 / 462 ♂/♀

Languages
  - Official: Marathi
  - Other spoken: Hindi
- Time zone: UTC+5:30 (IST)
- Website: pune.nic.in

Tikona is a village and gram panchayat in India, situated in the Mawal taluka of Pune district in the state of Maharashtra. It encompasses an area of 676.61 ha (1,672 acres).

== Administration ==
The village is administrated by a sarpanch, an elected representative who leads a gram panchayat. At the time of the 2011 Census of India, the village was a self-contained gram panchayat, meaning that there were no other constituent villages governed by the body.

== Demographics ==
At the 2011 census, the village comprised 177 households. The population of 978 was split between 516 males and 462 females.

== See also ==
- List of villages in Mawal taluka
