= Kune Nane Mawal =

Village in Maharashtra

- Village
- Location in Maharashtra, India Kune Nane Mawal (India)
- Coordinates: 18.7656767°N 73.3478053°E
- Country: India
- State: Maharashtra
- District: Pune
- Tehsil: Mawal

Government
  - Type: Panchayati Raj
  - Body: Gram panchayat

Area
  - Total: 944 ha (2,330 acres)

Population (2011)
  - Total: 1,954
  - Density: 207/km^{2} (536/sq mi)
- Sex ratio 1005/949 ♂/♀

Languages
  - Official: Marathi
  - Other spoken: Hindi
- Time zone: UTC+5:30 (IST)
- Pin code: 410405
- Telephone code: 02114
- ISO 3166 code: IN-MH
- Vehicle registration: MH-14
- Website: pune.nic.in

Kune Nane Mawal is a village in India, situated in Mawal taluka of Pune district in the state of Maharashtra. It encompasses an area of 944 ha (2,333 acres).

== Administration ==
The village is administrated by a sarpanch, an elected representative who leads a gram panchayat. In 2019, the village was itself the seat of a gram panchayat.

== Demographics ==
At the 2011 Census of India, the village comprised 430 households. The population of 1954 was split between 1005 males and 949 females.

== Air travel connectivity ==
The closest airport to the village is Pune Airport.

== See also ==
- List of villages in Mawal taluka
