= Dahivali, Mawal =

Village in Maharashtra

Dahivali
- Village
- Location in Maharashtra, India Dahivali (India)
- Coordinates: 18.7788707°N 73.4764982°E
- Country: India
- State: Maharashtra
- District: Pune
- Tehsil: Mawal

Government
  - Type: Panchayati Raj
  - Body: Gram panchayat

Area
  - Total: 320 ha (790 acres)

Population (2011)
  - Total: 950
  - Density: 300/km^{2} (770/sq mi)
- Sex ratio 497/453 ♂/♀

Languages
  - Official: Marathi
  - Other spoken: Hindi
- Time zone: UTC+5:30 (IST)
- Pin code: 410405
- Telephone code: 02114
- ISO 3166 code: IN-MH
- Vehicle registration: MH-14
- Website: pune.nic.in

Dahivali is a village in India, situated in Mawal taluka of Pune district in the state of Maharashtra. It encompasses an area of 320 ha (791 acres).

== Administration ==
The village is administrated by a sarpanch, an elected representative who leads a gram panchayat. In 2019, the village was not itself listed as a seat of a gram panchayat, meaning that the local administration was shared with one or more other villages.

== Demographics ==
At the 2011 Census of India, the village comprised 184 households. The population of 950 was split between 497 males and 453 females.

== See also ==
- List of villages in Mawal taluka
