= Atvan =

Village in Maharashtra

Atvan(sakru pathar)
- Village
- Sakaru pathar
- Location in Maharashtra, India Atvan(sakru pathar) (India)
- Coordinates: 18.699515°N 73.386352°E
- Country: India
- State: Maharashtra
- District: Pune
- Tehsil: Mawal

Government
  - Type: Panchayati Raj
  - Body: Gram panchayat

Area
  - Total: 535.50 ha (1,323.2 acres)

Population (2019)
  - Total: 183
  - Density: 34.2/km^{2} (88.5/sq mi)
- Sex ratio 89/94 ♂/♀

Languages
  - Official: Marathi
- Time zone: UTC+5:30 (IST)
- Pin code: 410405
- Telephone code: 02114
- ISO 3166 code: IN-MH
- Vehicle registration: MH-14
- Website: pune.nic.in

Atvan is a village in Mawal taluka of Pune district in the state of Maharashtra, India. It encompasses an area of 535.50 ha (1,323 acres).

Tourism in Atvan- Somjai matta temple, Lionspoint, Tigerpoint, Tigerfall, Shivling point. Committee established in Atvan - JFM Committee Atvan. Chairperson of Atvan: Santosh Dhondu Margale

== Administration ==
The village is administrated by a sarpanch, an elected representative who leads a gram panchayat. In 2019, the village was not itself listed as a seat of a gram panchayat, meaning that the local administration was shared with one or more other villages.

== Demographics ==
At the 2019 Census of India, the village comprised 30 households. The population of 183 was split between 89 males and 94 females.

== See also ==
- List of villages in Mawal taluka
