= Laxman Shrawan Bhatkar =

Indian politician and social worker (1901–1970)

Personal details
- Born: 1901 Thugaon Amravati district
- Died: 7 February 1970 (aged 68–69)

Laxman Shrawan Bhatkar (born 1901 – 7 February 1970) was a politician and social worker from Central Provinces and Berar of British Raj. He was born in 1901 at Thugaon village of then Amravati district of the Province. He studied at Depressed Classes Mission High School at Mumbai.

Later he became member of Satyashodhak Samaj under the guidance of great Vitthal Ramji Shinde. He used to compose playfolk songs and stories for the welfare of untouchables. For them, he started Chokhamela Hostel at Chikhali in Buldhana district in 1921.

In 1951, he was elected to 1st Lok Sabha from the 2 seats of Buldana Akola constituency of then Madhya Pradesh State along with Gopalrao Bajirao Khedkar. In 1957, he was re-elected as a representative of the 2nd Lok Sabha from Buldana Akola constituency of then Bombay State. He represented Khamgaon Lok Sabha constituency in 3rd Lok Sabha. Along with it they were the Members of Constitution Assembly of India as Members (by province/state) Central Provinces and Berar.

He died on 7 February 1970.
