= Deoghar, Pune =

Village in Maharashtra

Deoghar Devghar
- village
- Location in Maharashtra, India Deoghar (India)
- Coordinates: 18°38′50″N 73°24′50″E
- Country: India
- State: Maharashtra
- District: Pune district

Government
  - Type: Panchayati raj (India)
  - Body: Gram panchayat

Languages
  - Official: Marathi
- Time zone: UTC+5:30 (IST)
- PIN: 412108
- Nearest city: Lonavala

Deoghar is a village in the Maval taluka of Pune district in Maharashtra State, India.
