= Karunj =

Village in Maharashtra

- Village
- Location in Maharashtra, India Karunj (India)
- Coordinates: 18.7096188°N 73.512311°E
- Country: India
- State: Maharashtra
- District: Pune
- Tehsil: Mawal

Government
  - Type: Panchayati Raj
  - Body: Gram panchayat

Area
  - Total: 566 ha (1,400 acres)

Population (2011)
  - Total: 1,722 *sarpanch* -:sadashiv shendage
  - Density: 304/km^{2} (788/sq mi)
- Sex ratio 900/822 ♂/♀

Languages
  - Official: Marathi
  - Other spoken: Hindi
- Time zone: UTC+5:30 (IST)
- Pin code: 410405
- Telephone code: 02114
- ISO 3166 code: IN-MH
- Vehicle registration: MH-14
- Website: maharashtra.gov.in

Karunj is a village and gram panchayat in India, situated in Mawal taluka of Pune district in the state of Maharashtra. It encompasses an area of 566 ha (1,399 acres).

== Administration ==
The village is administrated by a sarpanch, an elected representative who leads a gram panchayat.In the Gram Panchayat elections held in 2019, Mr. Sadashiv Dasharath Shendge! was elected as the first elected Sarpanch of Karunj village by a majority. At the time of the 2011 Census of India, the village was the headquarters for the eponymous gram panchayat, which also governed the village of karunj and Bedse.

== Demographics ==
At the 2011 census, the village comprised 279 households. The population of 1722 was split between 900 males and 822 females.

== See also ==
- List of villages in Mawal taluka
