= Kivale =

Village in Maharashtra

- Village
- Location in Maharashtra, India Kivale (India)
- Coordinates: 18.6600607°N 73.7201942°E
- Country: India
- State: Maharashtra
- District: Pune
- Tehsil: Khed

Government
  - Type: Panchayati Raj
  - Body: Gram panchayat

Area
  - Total: 1,261 ha (3,120 acres)

Population (2011)
  - Total: 788
  - Density: 62.5/km^{2} (162/sq mi)
- Sex ratio 418/370 ♂/♀

Languages
  - Official: Marathi
  - Other spoken: Hindi
- Time zone: UTC+5:30 (IST)
- Pin code: 412101
- Telephone code: 020
- ISO 3166 code: IN-MH
- Vehicle registration: MH-14
- Website: pune.nic.in

Kivale is a village in India, situated in the Mawal taluka of Pune district in the state of Maharashtra. It encompasses an area of 1,261 ha (3,116 acres).

== Administration ==
The village is administrated by a sarpanch, an elected representative who leads a gram panchayat. At the time of the 2011 Census of India.

== Demographics ==
At the 2011 census, the village comprised 134 households. The population was 788 (418 males and 370 females).

== Air travel connectivity ==
The closest airport to the village is Pune Airport.

== See also ==
- List of villages in Mawal taluka
