= Dahivali, Ratnagiri =

Village in Maharashtra

Dahivali
- Village
- Interactive map of Dahivali
- Country: India
- State: Maharashtra

Dahivali is a small village in Ratnagiri district, Maharashtra state in Western India. The 2011 Census of India recorded a total of 465 residents in the village. Dahivali's geographical area is approximately 726 hectares (1,790 acres).
