= Varale (Mawal) =

Village in Maharashtra

- Village
- Country: India
- State: Maharashtra
- District: Pune
- Tehsil: khed taluka

Government
  - Type: Panchayati Raj
  - Body: Gram panchayat

Area
  - Total: 416 ha (1,030 acres)

Population (2011)
  - Total: 800
  - Density: 190/km^{2} (500/sq mi)
- Sex ratio 360 / 440 ♂/♀

Languages
  - Official: Marathi
  - Other spoken: Hindi
- Time zone: UTC+5:30 (IST)
- Telephone code: 02114
- ISO 3166 code: IN-MH
- Vehicle registration: MH-14
- Website: pune.nic.in

Varale is a village in Khed taluka of Pune district in the state of Maharashtra, India. It encompasses an area of 416 ha (1,028 acres).

== Administration ==
The village is administrated by a sarpanch, an elected representative who leads a gram panchayat. In 2019, the village was not itself listed as a seat of a gram panchayat, meaning that the local administration was shared with one or more other villages.

== Demographics ==
At the 2011 Census of India, the village comprised 1633 households. The population of 7202 was split between 3785 males and 3417 females.

== See also ==
- List of villages in khed taluka
