= Devale, Raigad =

Village in Maharashtra

Devale
- village
- Interactive map of Devale
- Country: India
- State: Maharashtra
- District: Raigad

Languages
  - Official: Marathi
- Time zone: UTC+5:30 (IST)
- Postal code: 402303

Devale is a small village located in Poladpur Tehsil, in Raigad district, Maharashtra, India.

It is closely surrounded by hills from Sahyadri Mountain Ranges and the river Savitri. There is a view of Mahabaleshwar and Pratapgadh from there.

The village is formed by four small vadis: Fase vadi (vitthal vadi), Jambhul vadi, Chikhal vadi (chitre vadi) and Palikadache devale. Except Chikhal vadi (chitrevadi), all other vadis are on top of three different hillocks and together form village of Devale.

One of the ancient Shiva temples resides on the banks of river Savitri. It is said that villagers wanted to rebuild the Shiva Temple and started excavating the area near the Shivalingam, when they discovered the Stone Ledden base of preexisting old Shiva Temple. The present Shiva Temple is built on top of this base. Many other more ancient temples like Bhairavnaath temple are main historical places to see.

This village has a recently built dam which connects the two High Hills and blocks a free flowing terrain. The dam increases the beauty of this place many-fold.

== Schools ==
Devale has two schools, the Central School Devale, which has primary education facility up to 4th Standard and the other school is a secondary school for education from 5th Standard to 10th Standard.

The secondary school is Naraveer Tanaji Malusare Vidyalay Devale (N.T.M.V.D). It is located on the bank of river Savitri. It has a well trained teaching staff and a good infrastructure with computer training and Library facility.

School not only encourages students to pursue education but also inculcates the importance of nature and plants in their life. The school is well known for its Kabaddi players. Most of the students belong to farmer families and they learn basics of Farming and tree plantation during their childhood and school rightly supports their interest and also teaches them importance of the higher education. Every year school arrange cultural events and educational tours for Students.

== Economy ==
The main profession of the people from Devale is farming. There are three main seasons; winter (November to February), summer (March to June) and Monsoon (rainy) season (June or July until September). Devale gets very heavy rains every year, up to 30 cm in a day in peak July time.

The main crop is rice; other farm products include nachani and "vari". Farmers also produce various vegetables and fruits. There are many mango, jackfruit and cashew nut trees in and around the village.

People from this region are part of a much greater section of Maharashtra, called Konkan, and thus follow Konkani life style.
