= Khadkale =

- Census town
- Location in Maharashtra, India
- Coordinates: 18.772°N 73.5806°E
- Country: India
- State: Maharashtra
- District: Pune

Population (2001)
  - Total: 9,792

Languages
  - Official: Marathi
- Time zone: UTC+5:30 (IST)

Khadkale is a census town in Pune district in the Indian state of Maharashtra.

== Demographics ==
As of 2001 India census, Khadkale had a population of 9792. Males constitute 52% of the population and females 48%. Khadkale has an average literacy rate of 70%, higher than the national average of 59.5%: male literacy is 77%, and female literacy is 62%. In Khadkale, 15% of the population is under 6 years of age.
