= Maval taluka =

- Tehsil
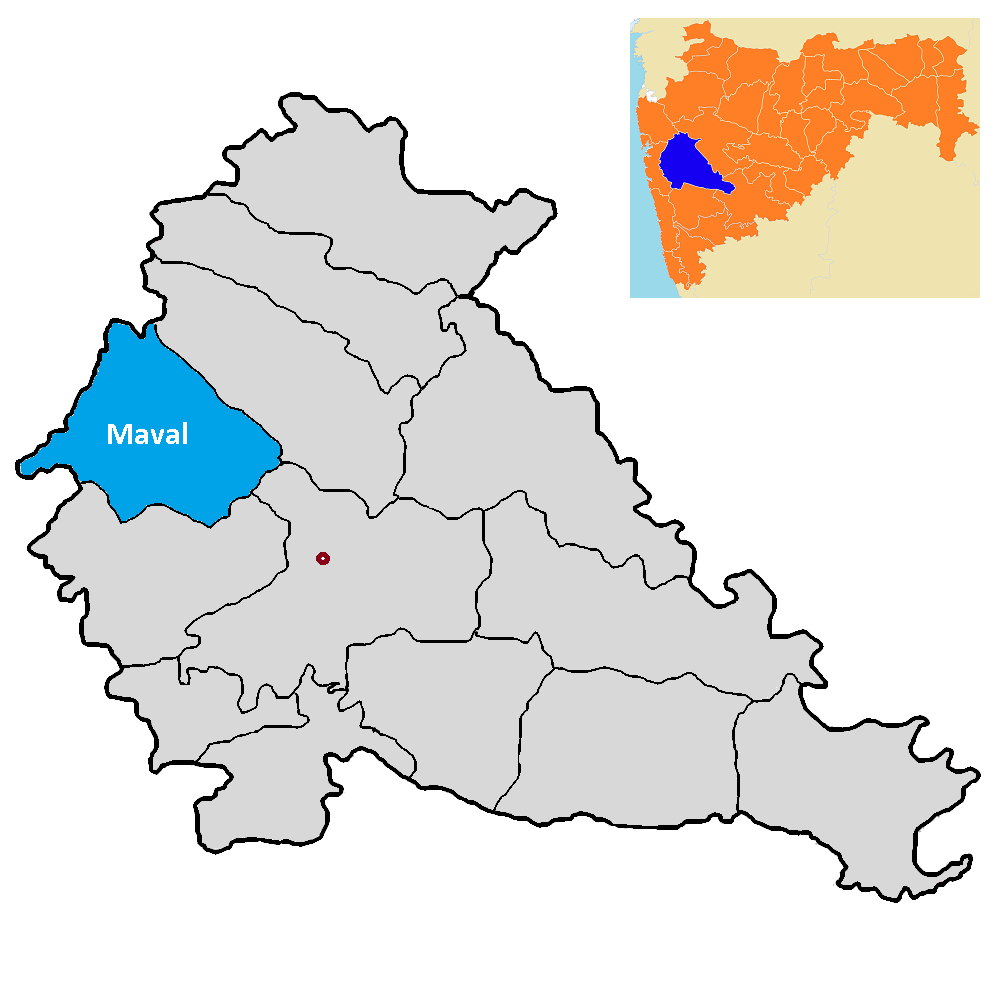
- Location of Maval in Pune district in Maharashtra
- Country: India
- State: Maharashtra
- District: Pune district

Population (2011)
  - Total: 377,559

Maval taluka is a taluka in Mawal subdivision of Pune district of state of Maharashtra in India.

At the time of the 2011 Census of India, the taluka comprised 187 villages, a figure that was unchanged from 2001. There were also three census towns at that time - Wadagaon, Khadkale and Kusgaon Budruk. The census towns had their own governing bodies, whilst the gram panchayats which governed the villages numbered 100; there were two villages - Ahirvade and Kamshet - which had no official governing body.

== Demographics ==
Religions in Maval taluk (2011)
Religion	Percent
Hinduism	85.62%
Buddhism	7.12%
Islam	4.38%
Jainism	1.27%
Christianity	0.89%
Other or not stated	0.72%

Maval taluka has a population of 377,559 according to the 2011 census. Maval had a literacy rate of 82.38% and a sex ratio of 902 females per 1000 males. 46,644 (12.35%) are under 7 years of age. 157,775 (41.79%) lived in urban areas. Scheduled Castes and Scheduled Tribes make up 9.62% and 7.74% of the population respectively.

Languages of Maval taluk (2011)
1. Marathi (82.9%)
2. Hindi (8.90%)
3. Marwari (1.24%)
4. Gujarati (0.97%)
5. Kannada (0.95%)
6. Others (5.01%)

At the time of the 2011 Census of India, 82.93% of the population in the district spoke Marathi, 8.90% Hindi, 1.24% Marwari, 0.97% Gujarati and 0.95% Kannada as their first language.

== See also ==
- Talukas in Pune district
- List of villages in Mawal taluka
