= Baur =

Baur can refer to:

- Baur (surname)
- Baur River, river in India
- Baur (village), a village in Pune district, India
- Baur H-AR, a fictitious heavy assault rifle in Battlefield 2142.
- Karosserie Baur, German coachmaker
