= Intermeccanica =

Italian-Canadian car manufacturer

Construzione Automobili Intermeccanica
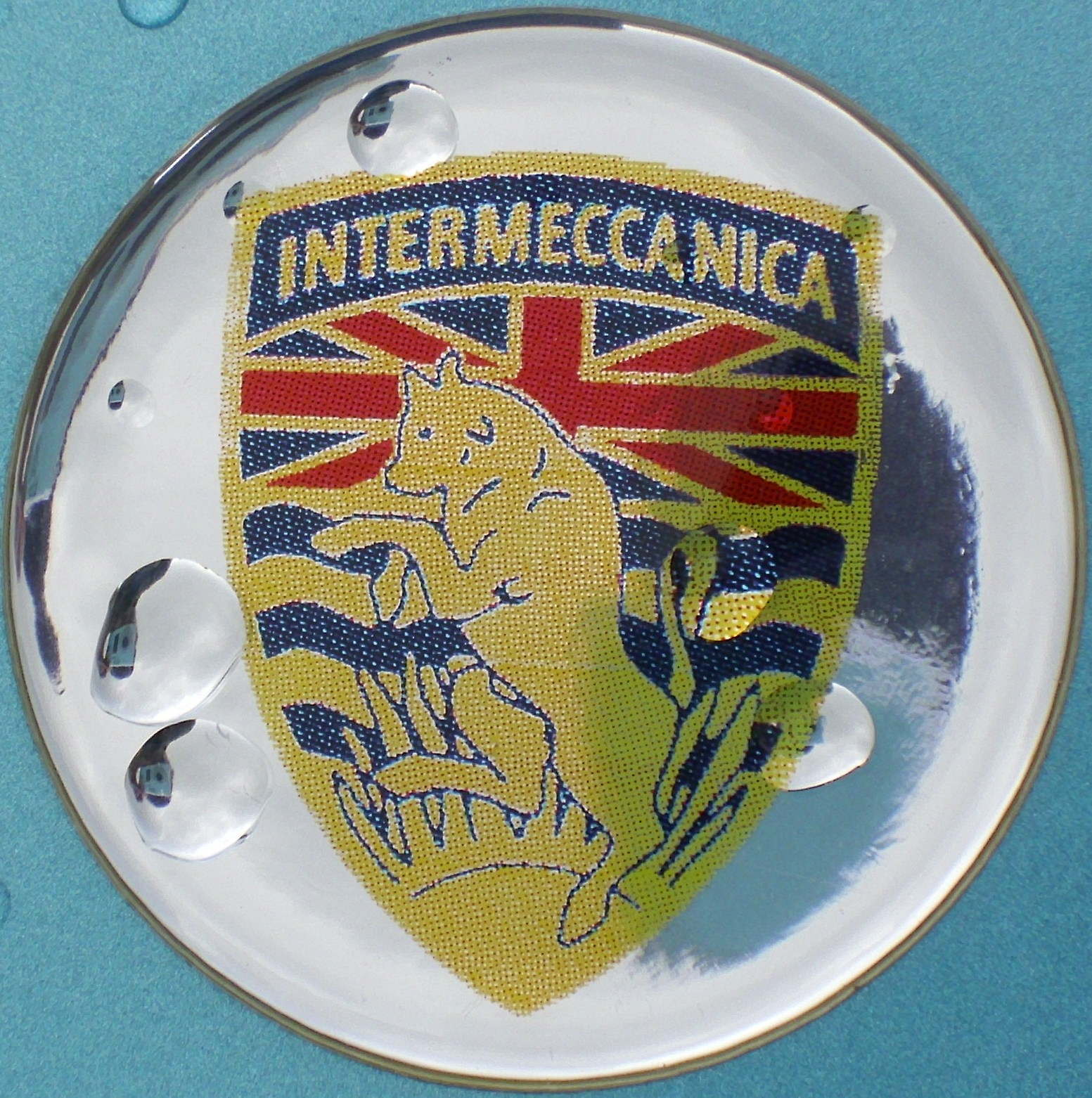
- Type: Private
- Industry: Automotive
- Founded: 1959
- Founder: Frank Reisner
- Headquarters: New Westminster, Canada
- Area served: Worldwide
- Key people: Henry Reisner (President)
- Products: Performance automobiles

Intermeccanica (formally Construzione Automobili Intermeccanica) is an automobile manufacturer, founded in Turin, Italy, in 1959 by Frank Reisner and Paula Reisner. It subsequently moved first to the United States, then to Canada, and is currently headed by Frank's son, Henry Reisner.

== History ==
=== Founding ===
Initially, the company made tuning kits. The first car was a Formula Junior single-seater using a Peugeot engine, in 1960, which was followed by 21 aluminium-bodied Intermeccanica-Puch (IMP) 500 cc-engined cars, of which one won at the Nürburgring.

Larger American V8 engines were used in the Apollo GT, of which 88 cars were made for International Motor Cars, from 1961 to 1965. The Veltro prototype, however, had a small Ford Anglia-sourced engine. These cars and some other prototypes were designed by Franco Scaglione. The Italia was a larger GT sports car, of which approximately 500 were made, from 1966 to 1972, followed by eleven Murena GT models in 1971. The same year, with Erich Bitter and Opel, Intermeccanica developed the Indra, followed by a few years of assembling the Squire car.

The company relocated to Santa Ana, California, in 1975 and started to build replica cars, such as the Porsche 356 Speedster in 1976 and Checker Taxi in 1979. It is now known as Intermeccanica International Inc., and has been based in Vancouver since 1982.

Intermeccanica today manufactures the Roadster, a replica of the 1959 Porsche 356 convertible, as well as offering a replica of the 1940 World War 2 Volkswagen Kubelwagen "Type 82". Other products include a 1958 Speedster and "turbo look" versions of both the Roadster and Speedster.

=== Intermeccanica history, 1959 to date ===
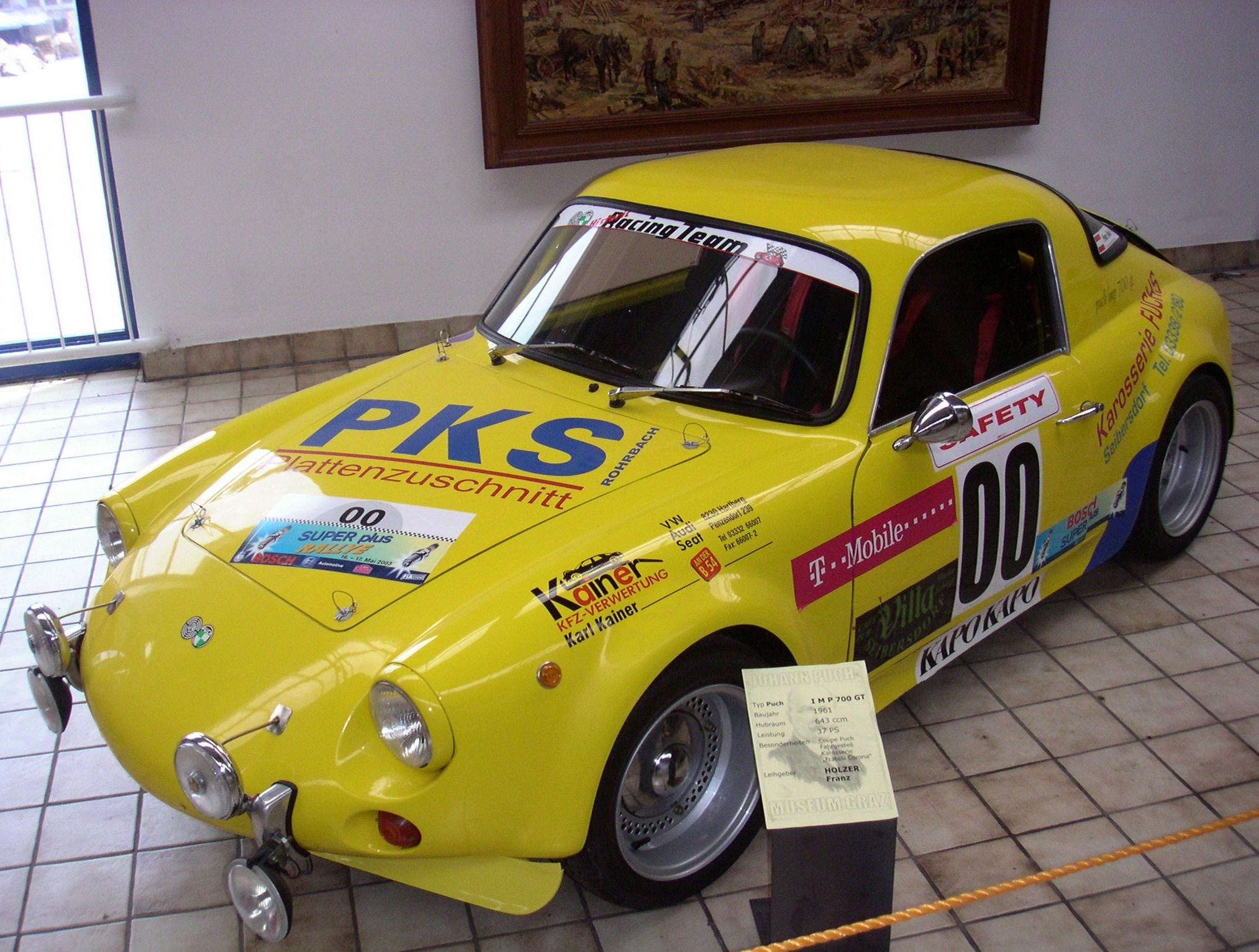
Intermeccanica Puch IMP 700 GT Coupé (1961), based on the Austrian Puch 500

Intermeccanica was founded in Turin, Italy, in 1959. Its first project was speed equipment kits for Renault, Simca, Peugeot, and DKW. Kits consisted of dual throat carburetors, intake manifolds, high-performance cams and oil filters.

A full line of free-flow exhaust systems was developed for 50 or more European cars in cooperation with an Italian tube company. These were marketed under the Intermeccanica label everywhere but North America, and sold particularly well in South Africa. In North America, they were distributed by Stebro, who eventually made the systems themselves.

In 1960, from modifications of Peugeot engines a Formula Junior de-stroked, a counterweighted engine was developed, using the facilities of Conrero. A Formula Junior racing car, one of the first with a rear engine, was also built and sold. When the English Formula Juniors with Ford-based engines in the rear came out a few months later, the IM was outclassed. However, about ten engines were sold.

A small aluminium two-seater coupe was developed by Intermeccanica, based on the Austrian Puch 500. The Puch was a hybrid, with part Fiat 500 chassis and body and part Puch mechanicals, namely a 500 cc air-cooled opposed twin engine, special brakes, and transmission. After a presentation of the prototype car to Steyr-Daimler-Puch AG in Graz, Austria, 21 of these small coupés were built. Some were touring cars, and some lightened for racing. The IMP won the 500 cc class one year at Nurburgring.

During 1961–1963, the Apollo GT body was developed by Intermeccanica for International Motor Cars (a company based in Oakland, California) based on an original design by Ron Plescia, a graduate of Design Center of Pasadena California and a professional product designer. There was one aluminium prototype completed by Intermeccanica. The company then supplied body/chassis units in steel to International Motor Cars, with the design tweaked by famous Italian designer Franco Scaglione; final assembly was done by IMC in Oakland, using the new Buick aluminium V8 engine and all Buick running gear. The cars were upholstered in leather and used Borrani wire wheels. Altogether 77 coupés (including the original alloy prototype and a 2+2 prototype) and 11 convertible Apollos were built between 1961 and 1965. In 1963 Intermeccanica exhibited the Apollo coupe at the Turin Automobile Show.

In 1965 the prototype Apollo 2 + 2 was built and exhibited at the New York Automobile Show. It was judged best of the show. Also, a Mustang station wagon prototype was built for some J. Walter Thompson advertising agency partners. The car was presented as an idea car to Ford Motor Company.

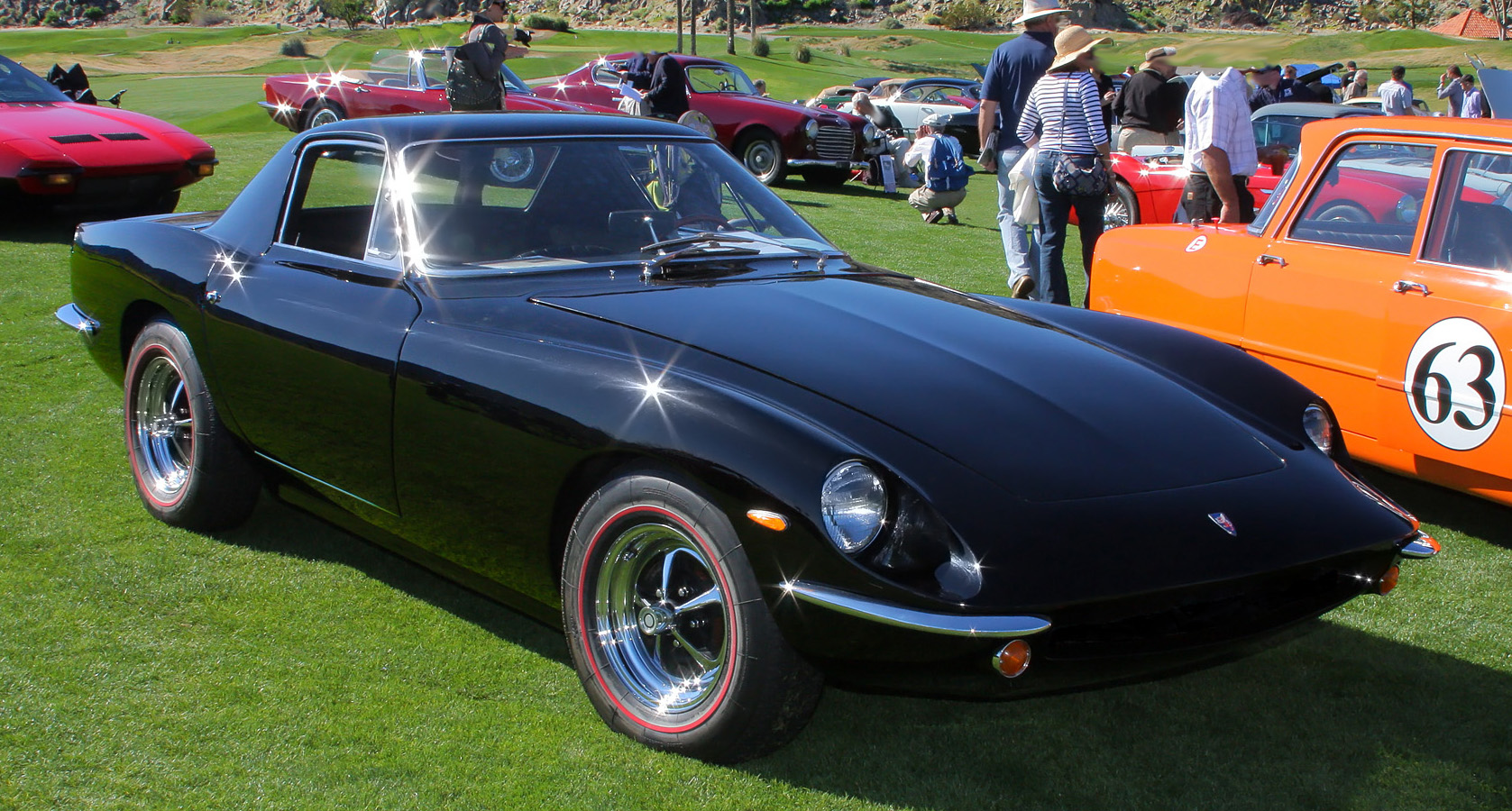
"Griffith 600" coupé (1966)

A prototype English Ford 106E based car was built, called the Veltro.

In 1966, a new project was started with Jack Griffith of Long Island, New York, for a larger production all steel car with more financing. Griffith had previously been responsible for a similar transatlantic venture, the TVR Griffith 200. Ex-BRM chassis designer John Crosthwaite, working as a consultant for Griffith (and later for Reisner on the Italia), designed the chassis for the Robert Cumberford shaped car called the Griffith GT. The Cumberford designs were finished and refined by Franco Scaglione and a Griffith was shown with a Plymouth 4.5 L V8 engine at the 1966 New York Motor Show.

Tooling was built and production started. Around fourteen cars were shipped when Griffith's company closed. A new customer, Steve Wilder, decided to take over the project, called the cars Omega and had them assembled by Holman and Moody in North Carolina. A total of 33 of these were delivered to the US.

It became obvious at this stage that the only way to pursue the construction of cars was if the cars left Italy fully assembled and running. In cooperation with an Italian bank, Credito Italiano, Intermeccanica found a distributor in Genser Forman of New Jersey, and finally, production and sales reached the 100 to 120 cars per year level. These cars were Ford V8 powered, with Ford running gear.

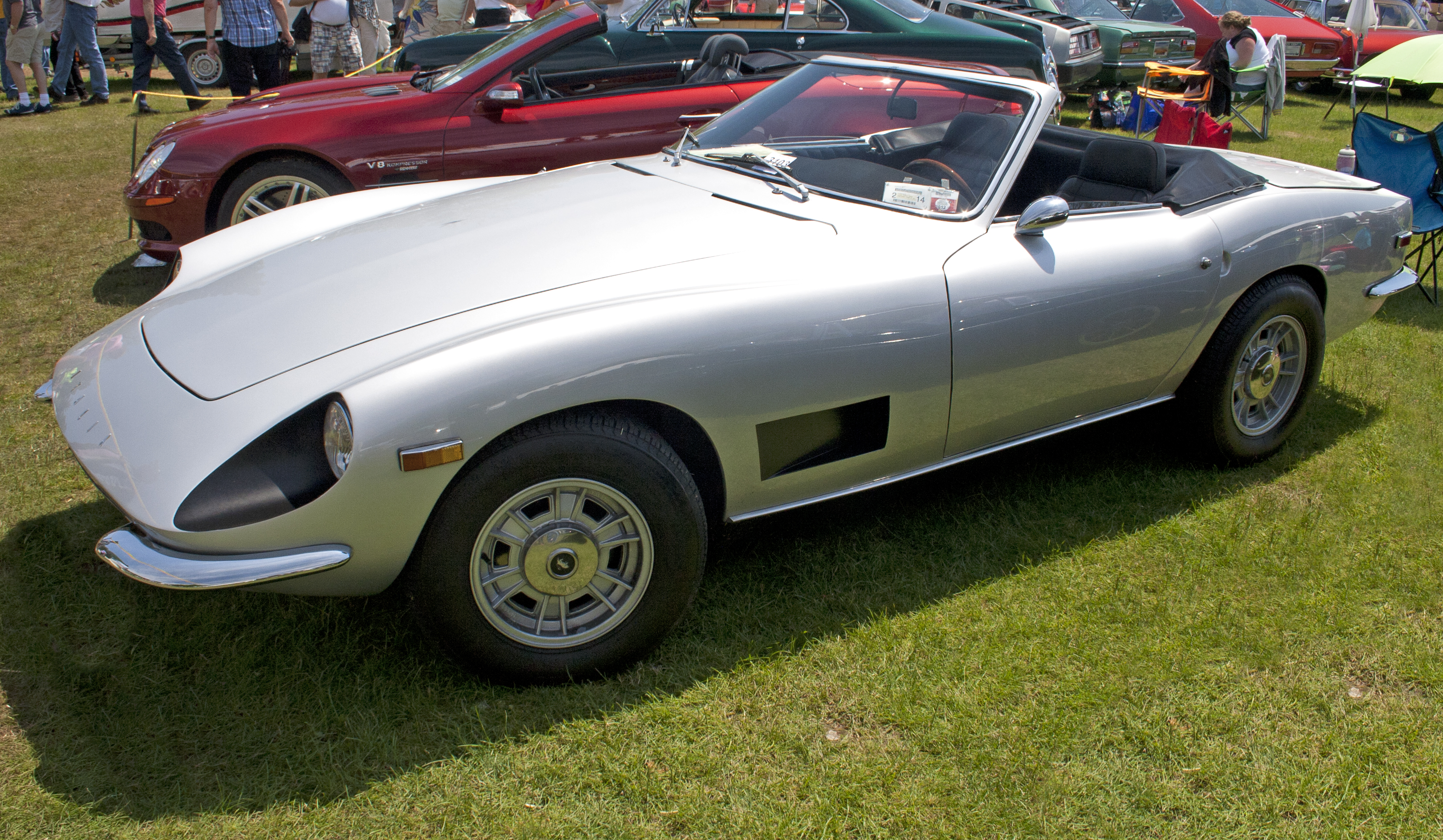
1972 Intermeccanica Italia spyder

The distribution was occasionally changed, but up until 1970 about 500 cars were built, first called Torino and later Italia (Ford already had the name Torino registered). The Italia was eventually produced as both a coupe and a very successful convertible.

A Corvair-based all steel prototype called the Phoenix was built for racing driver John Fitch.

During 1965-66 it is believed just two stretched Ford Mustang sports wagons in Highland Green and Signal Red with Ford 429 Hi-Performance engines were built to showcase to Ford what a family wagon could look like as a production vehicle, These luxury packages (four leather seats, bars with cut glass, deep pile carpets and aircraft switches) were constructed again as running cars for an importer in New York. Although Ford declined to take these prototypes onto production the originals exist to this day as fully restored and running show cars looking exactly as they would have back in their day, At the 1969 April New York Automobile Show Intermeccanica had cars on three different stands. For the 1969 Turin Automobile Show, a modified Italia, which conformed to Italian requirements, and added a few features such as a rear movable airfoil, was built. It was called the Italia IMX but remained a prototype.

During 1969–1970, Italias started to sell in Europe, especially in Germany through the newly appointed distributor, Erich Bitter. In 1970 the Centaur, a one-off two-door sedan based on a Corvette, was built for a doctor from the Mid-West. Also, Opel, a GM subsidiary in Germany, contacted Intermeccanica and a whole new project of a car, using the Opel mechanicals, the Chevrolet 350 engine, hydramatic transmission, DeDion rear end, disc brakes (parts used in the Opel Diplomat) was developed by Intermeccanica. The new car was the Indra, purely designed by Franco Scaglione. The Indra was presented at the Geneva Automobile Show and was Intermeccanica's most successful car.

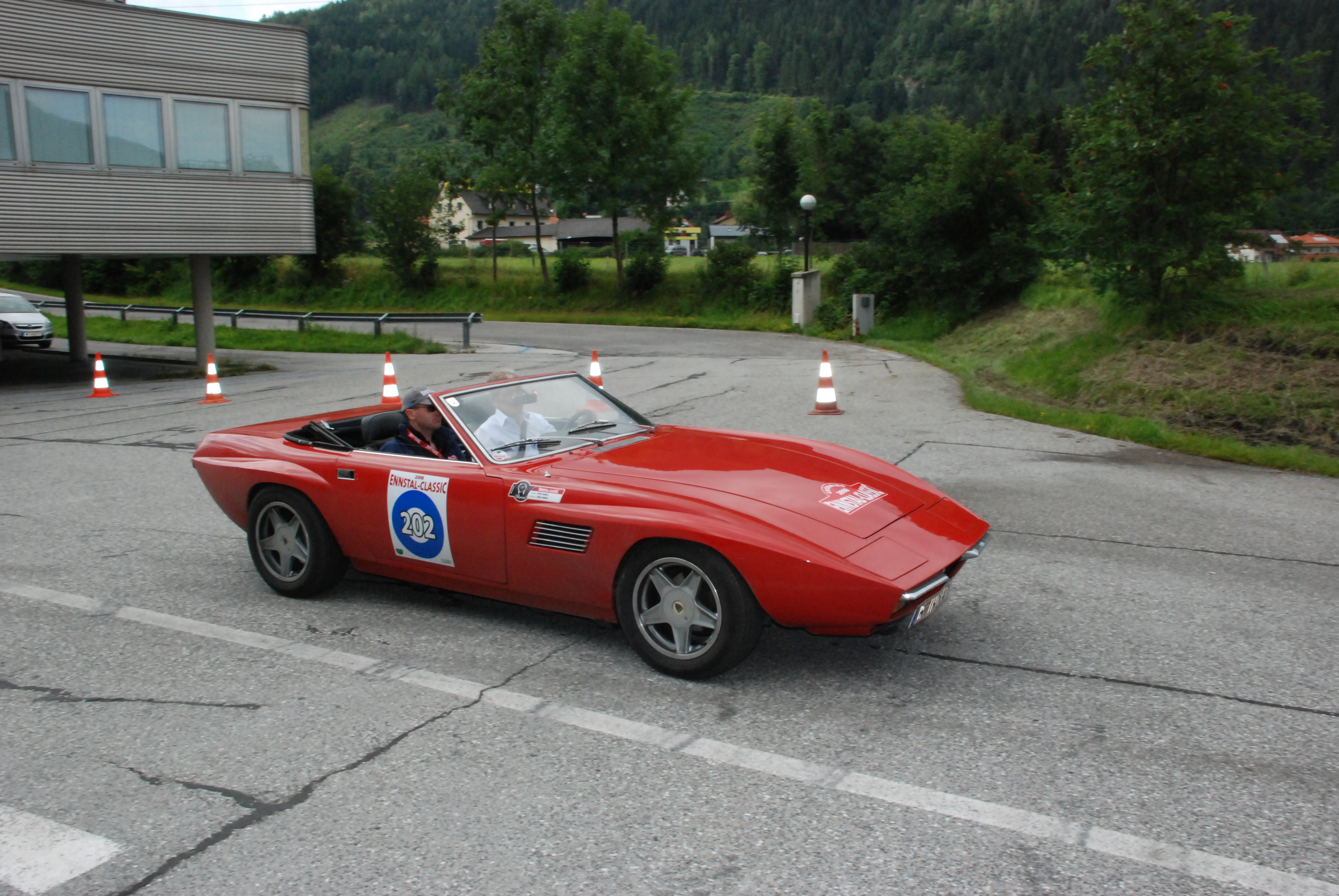
Intermeccanica Indra

Between 1971 and 1974, 125 Indras in three variants, convertible, notchback coupe, and fastback coupe were developed and built. In 1973 the Indra was presented at the New York Automobile Show, again with many orders taken and distributorship for the U.S. set up. At this stage, GM changed policy and stopped supplying both the Chevrolet engines and the Opel parts, as well as advising their Opel dealers in Germany that they were no longer to sell the Indras, with disastrous results for Intermeccanica. Distributor Erich Bitter developed a very similar replacement, the Bitter CD, built by Baur.

During 1974–1975, a series of replica SS Jaguars were assembled by Intermeccanica for a U.S. customer. These were fiberglass replicas, called Squires.

In 1975 two prototype Ford-engined Indras were built one shipped to the U.S. with all equipment for Indra construction in the U.S. also one development car with all Ford running gear This project was developed and initially financed by the Economic Development Council and the City of San Bernardino, California. About a month after Reisner and his family arrived in California, the project was canceled. In 1976 a Porsche Speedster replica was developed by Reisner, and tooling made, as well as a prototype, in Los Angeles.

During 1976–1979, Automobili Intermeccanica was formed in partnership between Reisner and Tony Baumgartner in Santa Ana, California, to build Speedsters. About 600 Speedsters were constructed. Baumgartner bought out Reisner's 50% share of Automobili Intermeccanica and later sold the Speedster project and equipment to Classic Motor Carriages in Florida.

During 1979–1980, tooling was developed by Reisner for the construction of a neo-classic based on the Checker chassis, with lines inspired by the Mercedes Erdmann Rossi model and the Duesenberg. This was a big, 129-inch wheelbase car. When the economy in California took a downturn and the market for this kind of car collapsed, the partnership could not come up with the financing required. Its code name was Lexington.

In 1981, Reisner developed a Roadster RS model based on the 1959 Porsche 356 Convertible "D" and made full tooling for this car. In October Reisner visited Vancouver and made an agreement with local investors, one an old Italia importer from Montreal, to transfer production of the Roadster RS to Vancouver.

During 1982–1985, Intermeccanica International Inc. started production of the Roadster RS and developed markets in Canada, the U.S., and Japan. In 1985 Intermeccanica developed a new tubular chassis for the Roadster RS to replace the original VW pan.

In 1986 Intermeccanica refined the Roadster RS, adding first simple flares, later modified nose and flares. Also developed was a new tubular steel chassis for the Roadster that uses all the mechanical parts of a six-cylinder Porsche 911. Hardtops were also added to both models.

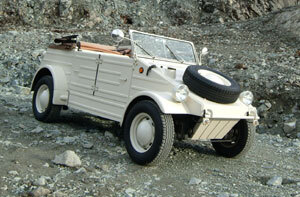
Kübelwagen replica by Intermeccanica

During 1995–1996, A new project, a replica of a "Volkswagen Kübelwagen", a Porsche-designed VW jeep used in World War II, was undertaken and production was initiated.

In October 2001 Reisner died of complications due to sarcoidosis. Frank's son Henry Reisner, who had worked at Intermeccanica part-time during high school and university, and full-time since took over as president. He is currently working on increasing production of Intermeccanica Roadsters, Speedsters and Kubelwagens destined for the U.S., Canada, and Japan.

In 2015, Henry Reisner co-founded ElectraMeccanica in Vancouver, British Columbia to start producing zero-emission electric commuter cars. Intermeccanica is a subsidiary of ElectraMeccanica since 2017, and the cross-functional team has been working on the research and development and production of the SOLO, and the research and development of the TOFINO.
