= Karanjgaon =

Karanjgaon may refer to:

- Karanjgaon, Mawal, Pune district, Maharashtra, India
- Karanjgaon, Niphad, Nashik district, Maharashtra, India

== See also ==
- Karajgaon, Palghar district, Maharashtra, India
