= Bitter Automotive =

German premium sports-luxury automobile marque

Erich Bitter Automobil GmbH
- Logo in the form of a stylised letter 'B'

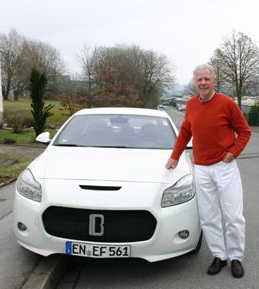
- Erich Bitter posing with a Bitter based on an Insignia
- Type: GmbH
- Industry: Automotive
- Founded: Schwelm, Germany (1971)
- Founder: Erich Bitter
- Headquarters: Schwelm, Germany
- Area served: Europe
- Products: Automobiles
- Website: Bitter Automotive (in German)

Erich Bitter Automobil GmbH (Bitter) is a premium sports-luxury automobile marque produced in Germany and later Austria. Founder Erich Bitter (1933–2023), a then retired racing driver turned automobile tuner, importer and ultimately designer began crafting his own vehicles after business ventures with Italian manufacturer Intermeccanica ended.

Bitter specialises in rebody-ing other manufacturer's vehicles and its initial production was between 1973 and 1989, selling vehicles in Europe and the United States. Thereafter, several prototypes followed with possible future low-volume production, but none arrived until the launch of the Bitter Vero in 2007.

== CD ==
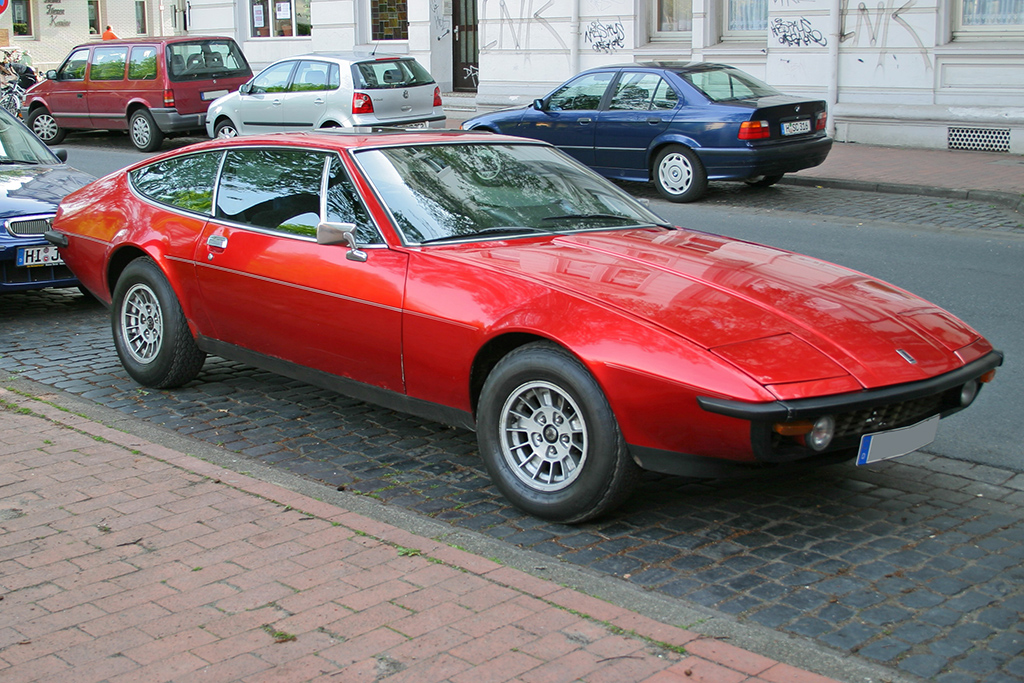

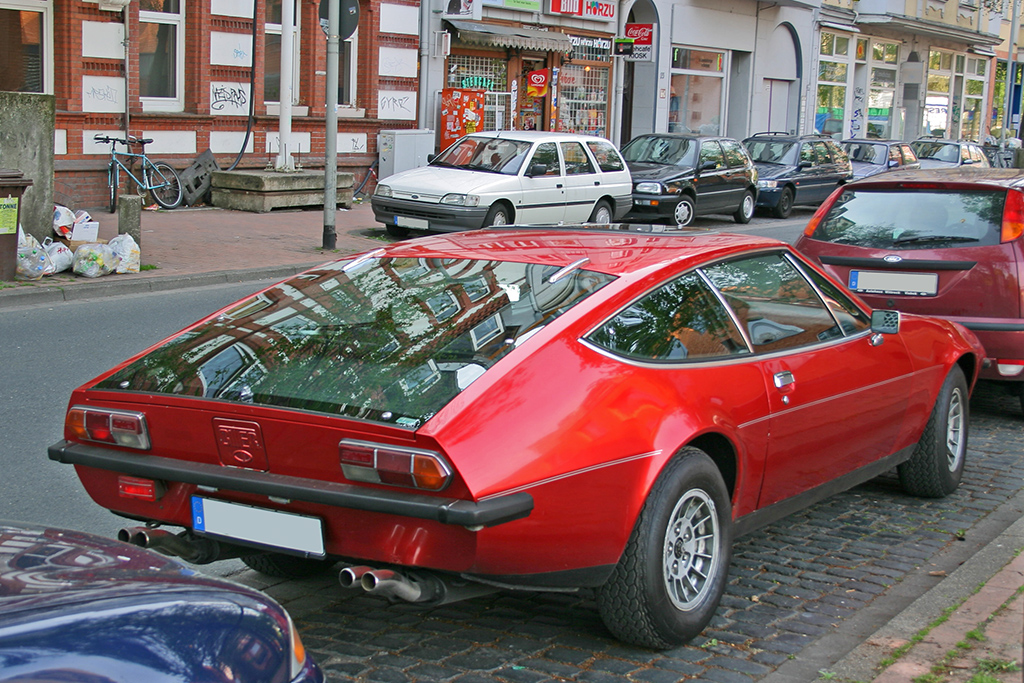
Bitter CD coupé

The Bitter CD, a three-door hatchback coupe featuring a 230 PS (169 kW) Chevrolet V8 with a 327ci displacement, was built between 1973 and 1979.

The CD was first shown in prototype form on 9 September 1969 at the Frankfurt Auto Show, as the Opel Coupé Diplomat ("CD") derived from the sedan version. It was designed by Charles M. "Chuck" Jordan (Opel's Design boss between 1967 and 1971 and later vice-president of General Motors (GM)) and Opel designer Dick Ruzzin, with the assistance of George A. Gallion, David Holls, Herbert Killmer and Hideo Kodama, as well as Erhard Schnell (Director of the Opel Designstudios 3 for Advanced Design from 1964). The tail was inspired by an Erhard Schnell's proposal for the 1969 Opel Aero GT.

Thanks to the positive reaction to the CD prototype, Opel considered developing a production model. The doors would adopt a conventional opening system and the bumper bar, windshield wipers and other parts would be derived from the Opel Diplomat in order to facilitate production and maintain costs. Robert "Bob" Lutz, who was Opel's Head of Sales and Marketing at the time and was keen to produce the car, commissioned Pietro Frua to advance the concept and produce two road-going prototypes.

In 1971, it was David R. "Dave" Holls (Opel design boss since July 1971; previously assistant to Chuck Jordan) who encouraged Erich Bitter to build the Bitter CD. As a result, Bitter GmbH was formed in 1971 to market the CD. He chose to locate the company on a 1-acre (4,000 m^{2}) site in his home town of Schwelm, Germany.

However, because he did not have the necessary capital and other resources to set up his own production facilities, Bitter turned to Baur GmbH in Stuttgart, as a proven independent small-scale manufacturer. He selected them based on their ability to produce high-quality prototypes and limited-production cars for other German manufacturers.

Bitter based his original CD designs on those of Frua, before making alterations closer to production. The basic design changes to Frua's CD design vis-à-vis the 1969 Opel CD consisted of a truncated rear end, modified windshield and less chrome application. Dave Holls and Opel's design team supplemented the design with a small front spoiler, larger grille, higher bumper bars and by prolonging upwards the lower edge of the rear side windows across the C-pillar to the rear hatch. Final prototype testing was conducted at the Opel Test Facility in Dudenhofen, in addition to load duration tests by Bitter at the Hydropulseur facility of Baur.

The Baur team also engaged in significant development work, which included manufacturing a hard foam mockup. Their role then extended to manufacturing the CD body panels, assembling the shell, preparing interior as well as installing the Opel Diplomat's mechanicals.

The Bitter CD was displayed, with great success, at the 1973 Frankfurt Motor Show, where Erich Bitter took 176 orders for his stylish new coupe. However, the 1973 oil crisis led to the cancellation of most orders. Despite this, production commenced later that same year at Baur GmbH. The target of 200 units a year was never realised, and Bitter sold 395 units in total. The purchase price in 1974 was DM 58,400.

Total production by year

1973	1974	1975	1976	1977	1978	1979	Body in white
6	99	79	73	71	30	37	5

== SC ==
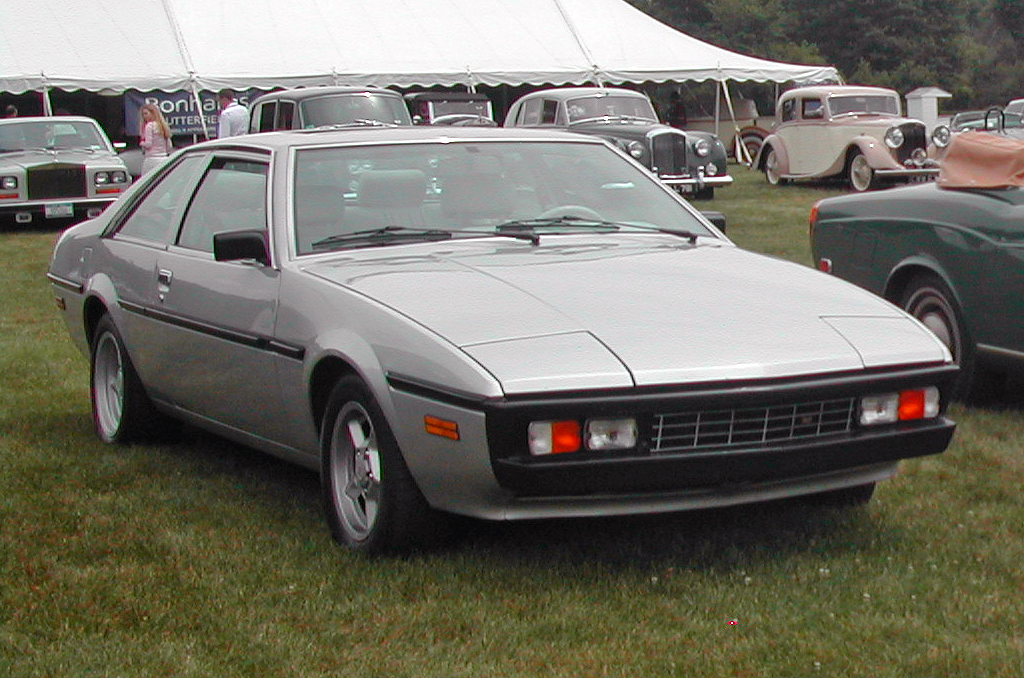

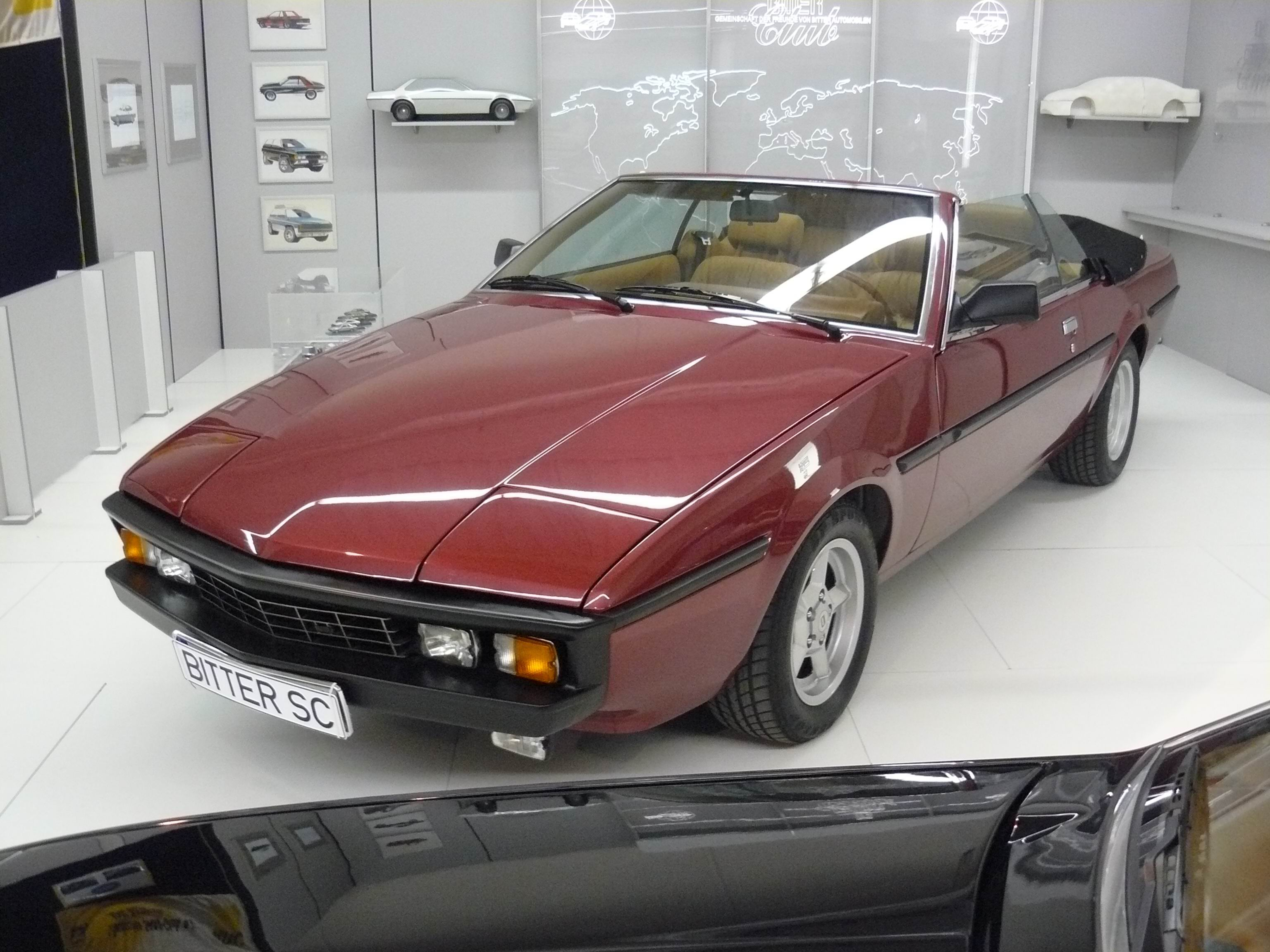
Bitter SC coupé (top) and convertible (bottom)

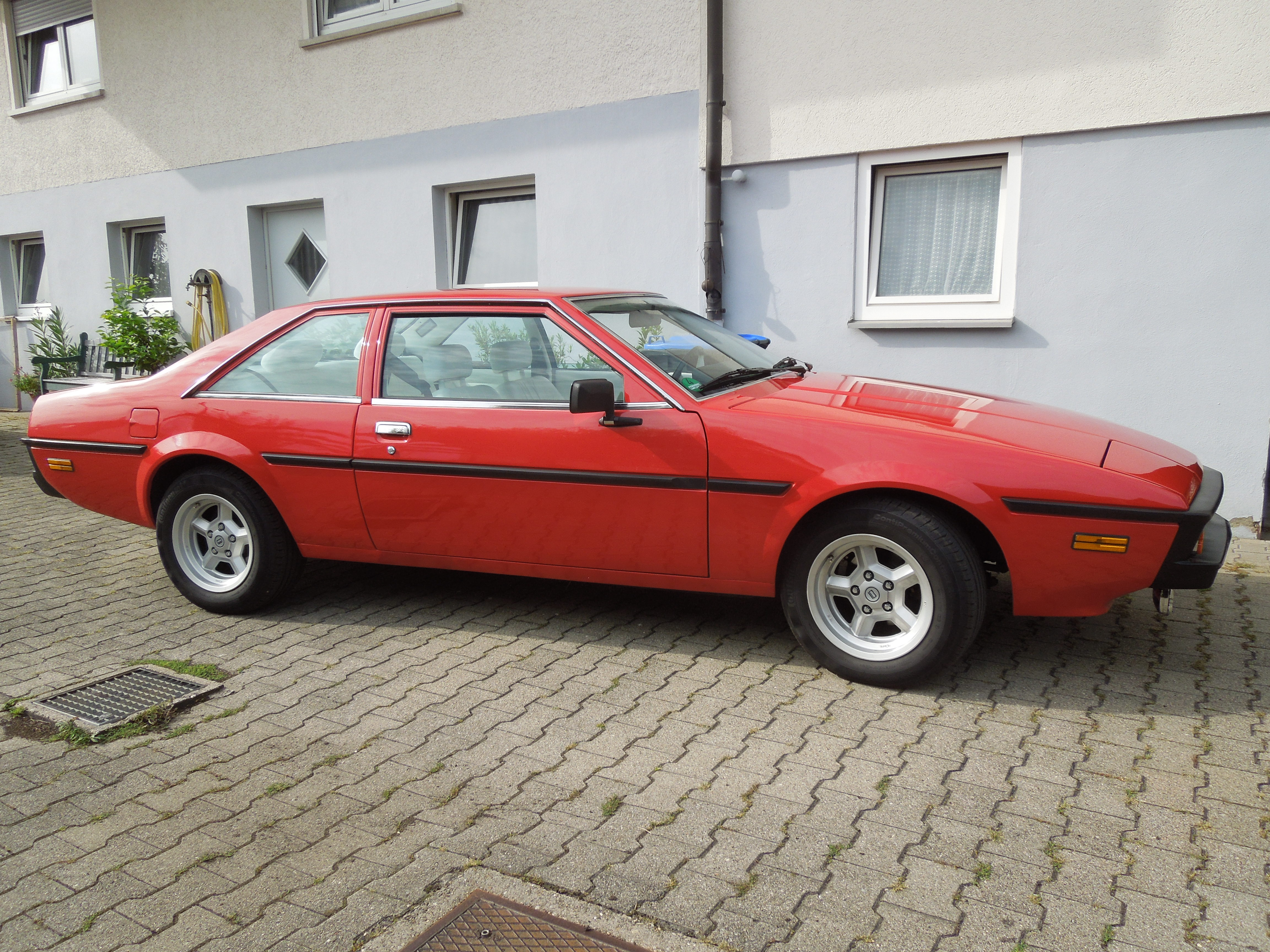

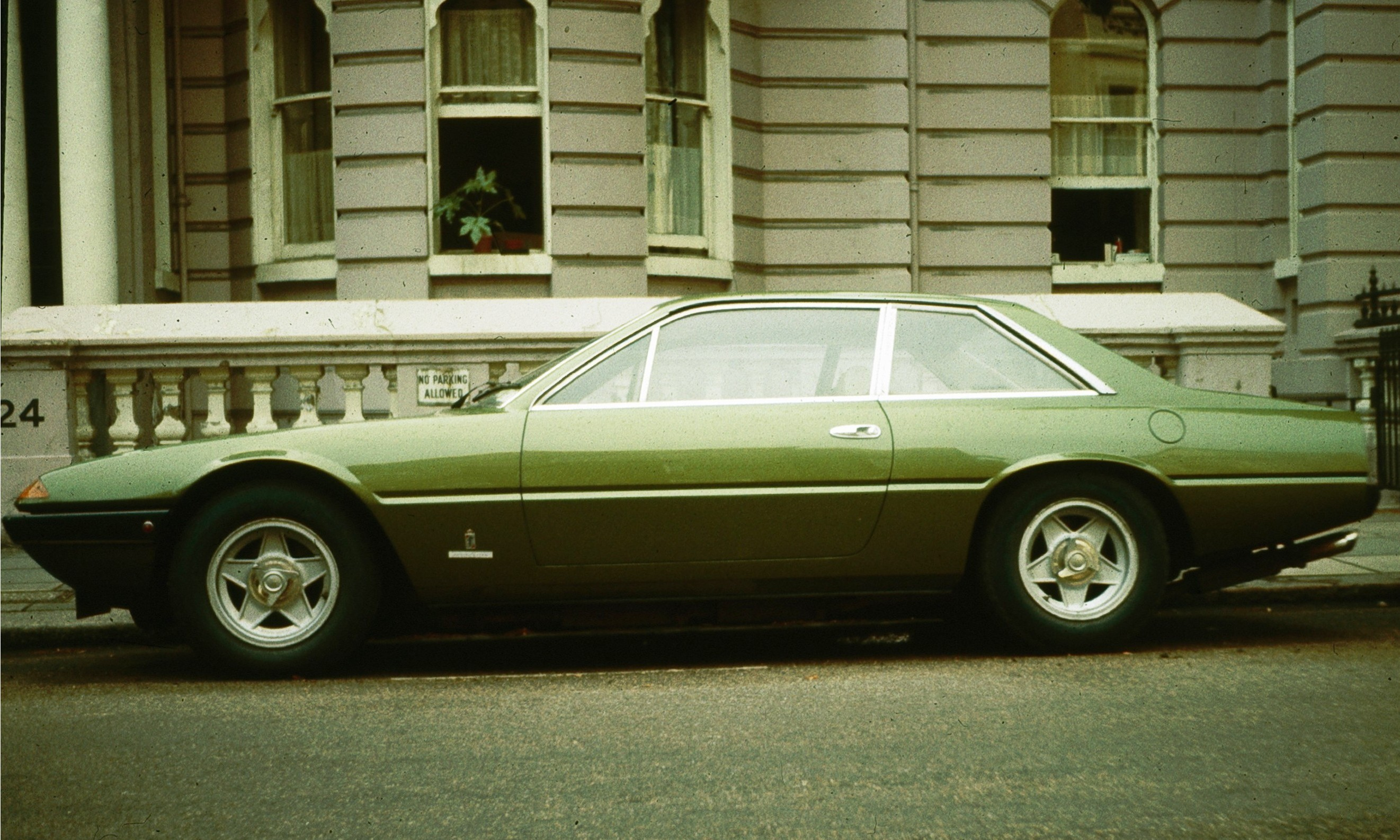
Visual similarities between the 1979 Bitter SC (top) and the 1972 Ferrari "Tipo F101" family (bottom)

The first SC model to be launched was the coupé, which was first shown in 1979 although sales did not start until the spring of 1981. It was followed by the convertible, first presented in 1981 at the Frankfurt Auto Show and going on sale in the spring of 1983. The final version to arrive was the sedan, shown in 1984 and becoming available in 1985. Like the CD, the SC was based on Opel's largest model at the time, the Opel Senator. It remained in production until 1989.

Exterior styling design echoed that of the Pininfarina-designed Ferrari 365 GT4 2+2 first shown in 1972, and later marketed as the 400 (1976) and 412 (1979). Bitter originally considered using a V8 engine; the 2.5-liter V8 from the Lamborghini Urraco and a Holden V8 both underwent benchtesting. However, emissions levels, fuel consumption, and high costs precluded their installation.

The SC was originally powered by a fuel-injected Opel 3.0-Litre in-line six-cylinder engine of 180 PS (132 kW). The power was acceptable but not quite sufficient for a car of its price class. Overheating concerns precluded fitting a turbocharger and instead Erich Bitter opted to add displacement. He had Opel-tuners Mantzel drastically increase the stroke, from 69.8 to 90.5 mm (2.75 to 3.56 in), creating a 3848 cc version. Referred to as a 3.9-litre (engine code M39E, the "M" for Mantzel), this version appeared in 1984 and produces 210 PS (154 kW) while also offering fifty percent more torque.

Bitter had hoped to maintain their relationship with Karosserie Baur, who had built the Bitter CD, but that company had meanwhile received a contract for building the BMW M1 and had no capacity to spare. Instead, Bitter went to a small, northern Italian coachbuilder called OCRA, near Turin. OCRA, however, did not have the means or experience to series produce bodies and lost the contract in early 1982, after 79 examples had been built. The bodywork on these early cars suffered from quality issues, in particular being very rust prone. Bitter then contracted with Maggiora to build the cars. As earlier, the painted bodies were sent to the Bitter factory in Schwelm where they underwent final assembly. As volumes picked up, however, assembly was handed off to Steyr-Puch in Graz, Austria in 1983.

Along with the introduction of the convertible in 1981, a four-wheel-drive version of the coupé was also added. The four-wheel-drive system was developed by Ferguson Research who also offered it for installation into the Opel Senator/Vauxhall Royale. Only a handful of these were built.

In 1984, Bitter announced at the New York Auto Show that it would enter into a limited marketing agreement with GM to sell the coupé version in the United States, through participating Buick dealerships. By being able to offer a premium European product, GM had hoped to regain market share lost to BMW at the time. The option of importing Opel cars was dismissed on the basis that it was perceived to be an entry-level brand, relative to BMW's premium status. Ultimately, fewer than a dozen Buick dealers (mostly in the metro New York City area) would bear the Bitter signage, resulting in minimal sales. The American introduction of the car was handled by Bitter Automobile of America, which was headquartered in Chicago and co-headed by Erich Bitter and Chicago business mogul Lee Miglin. The failure was based on its business model - with costs increasing and car manufacture becoming ever more complex, the market for rebodying other manufacturers' vehicles had been diminishing for decades.

1984 model cars were made to meet federal emissions standards by an independent importer, but engine components were melting and the cars were not making advertised power. For 1985, Bitter received help from Porsche and the cars were fitted with an oxygen sensor and a catalytic converter from Porsche. The version cleaned by Porsche develops 200 hp SAE net (149 kW; 203 PS) at 5100 rpm and 236 lb⋅ft (320 N⋅m) at 2400 rpm.

Total production by bodyshape

Coupé	Convertible	Sedan
461	22	5

== Vero ==
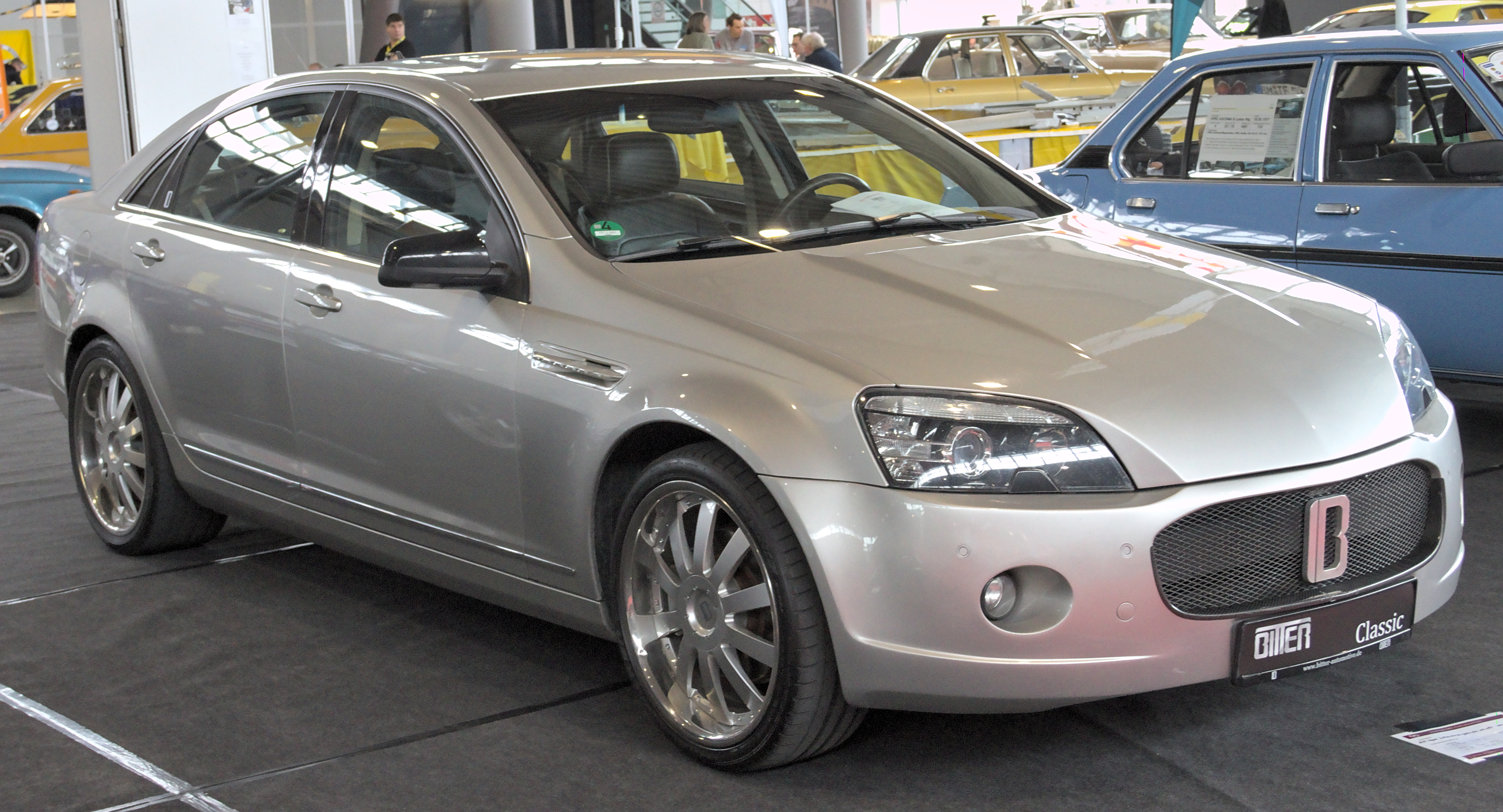

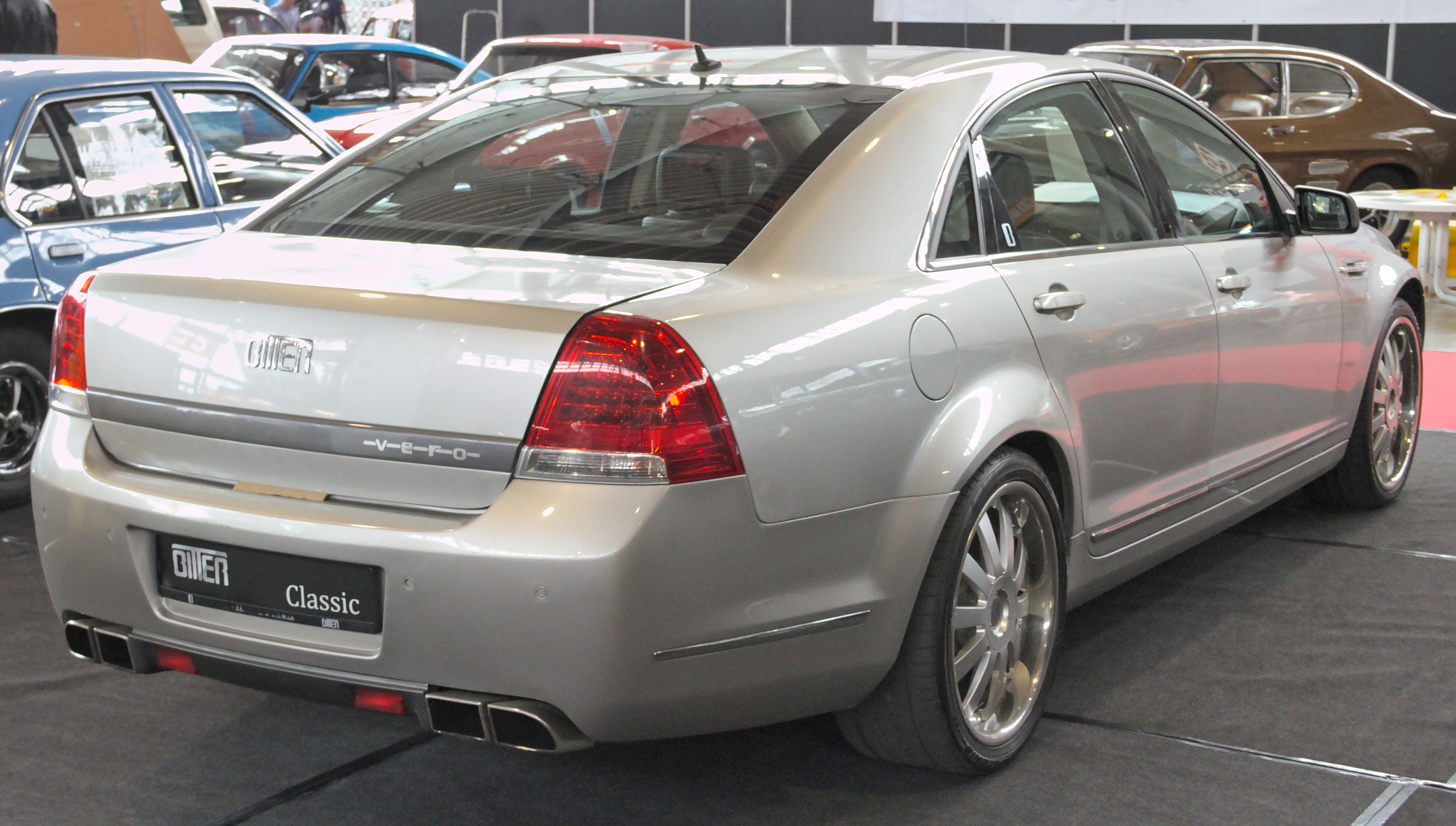
Bitter Vero

In 2007, Bitter resumed small-scale production by launching the Vero at the 2008 Geneva Motor Show. This car was derived from the Australian-made Holden Caprice (WM) sedan (the long-wheelbase luxury derivative of the Commodore VE), believed to be purchased directly from Holden thanks to Erich Bitter's friendship with Holden's former chairman Peter Hanenberger.

Relative to the donor car, the Vero features unique restyling claimed to have cost A$1 million, which took about a week to install. In particular, the vehicle is fitted with 20-inch alloy wheels and has an extended bonnet along with a redesigned front bumper incorporating a new grille, as well as a rear bumper insert to house rear foglights required in Europe. Its leather-trimmed interior featured luxury fittings from the donor car such as a DVD player and screens in the back of the front headrests for rear passengers. The donor car's Chevrolet V8 6.0-litre 362 PS (266 kW) engine, with a six-speed automatic transmission, remained unchanged.

The Vero sold in Germany for €121,975 and was discontinued in 2012.

== Vero Sport ==
In 2009, Bitter unveiled a "Vero Sport" at the Geneva Motor Show. Unlike the regular Holden Caprice (WM)-derived Vero, the Sport was directly based on the short-wheelbase Holden Commodore (VE) SS sedan, also sold as the Pontiac G8 in the United States. Like the Vero, the Vero Sport was also discontinued in 2012.

== Other models ==
=== Bitter Insignia ===
Bitter produced a luxury version of the Opel Insignia OPC between 2010 and 2013 as the Bitter Insignia.

=== Opel Adam, Opel Mokka and Opel Cascada by Bitter ===
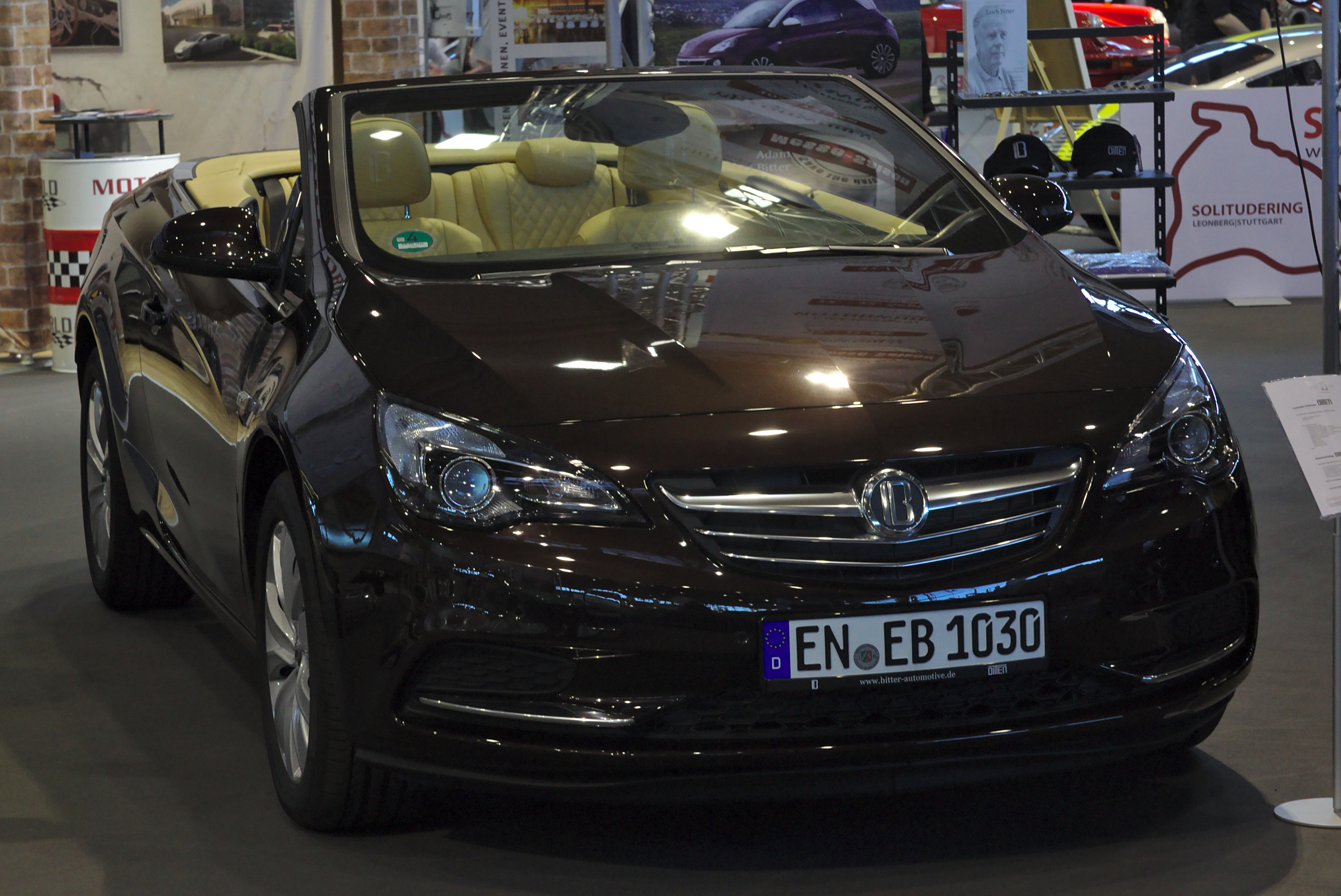
Bitter Cascada

Bitter produced luxury versions of the Opel Adam, the Opel Cascada and Opel Mokka. The Bitter Adam (marketed as "Adam by Bitter") has been produced since 2013. Production of the Bitter Mokka (marketed as "Mokka by Bitter") began in 2016. The name was changed to Mokka X (marketed as "Mokka X by Bitter") in late 2016 along with a facelift, just like the Opel and Vauxhall versions.

=== Current ===
Bitter currently produces luxury versions of the Mokka/Mokka e, Corsa GS-Line, Grandland X and Insignia models.

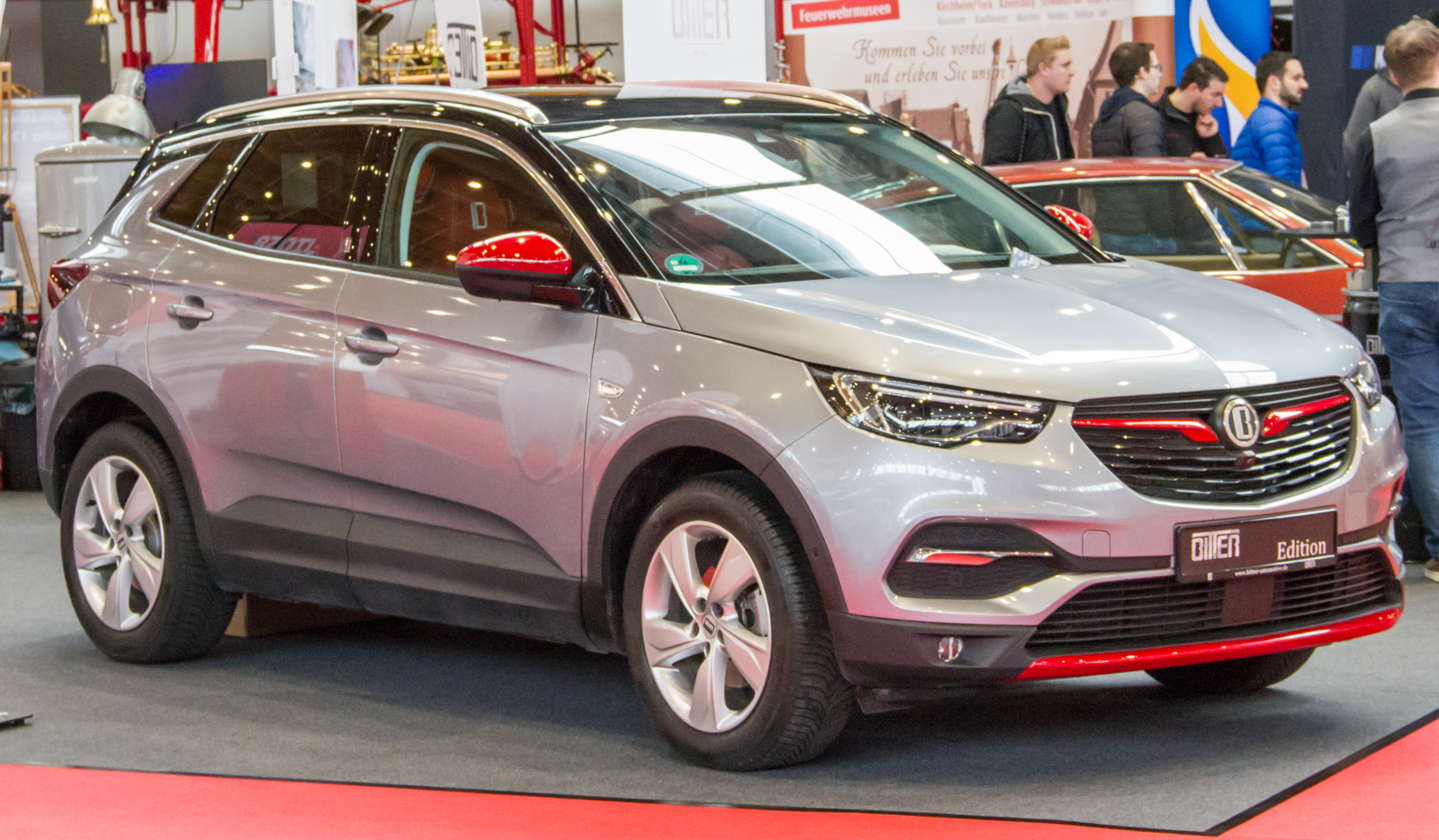
Bitter Grandland X

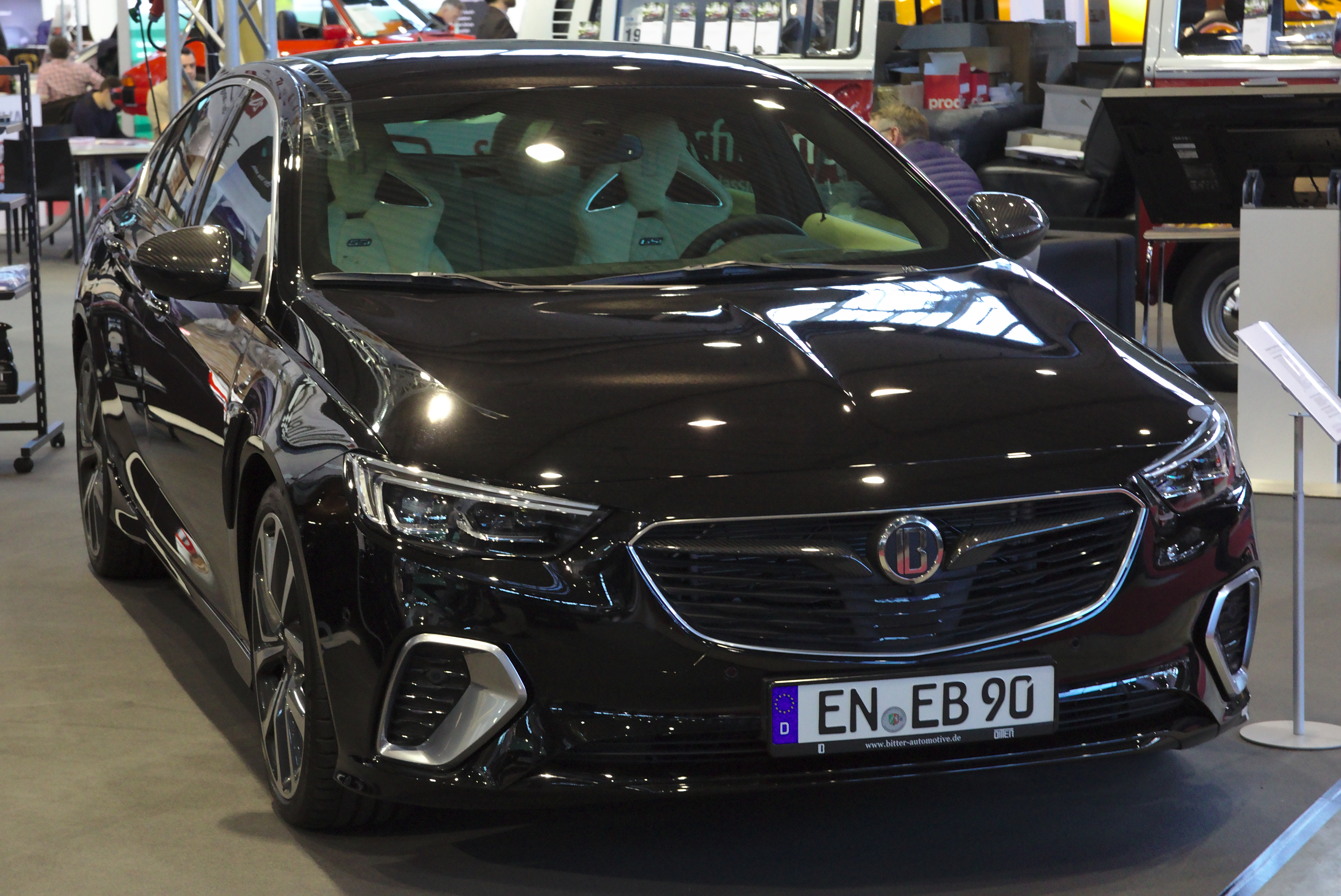
Bitter Insignia B

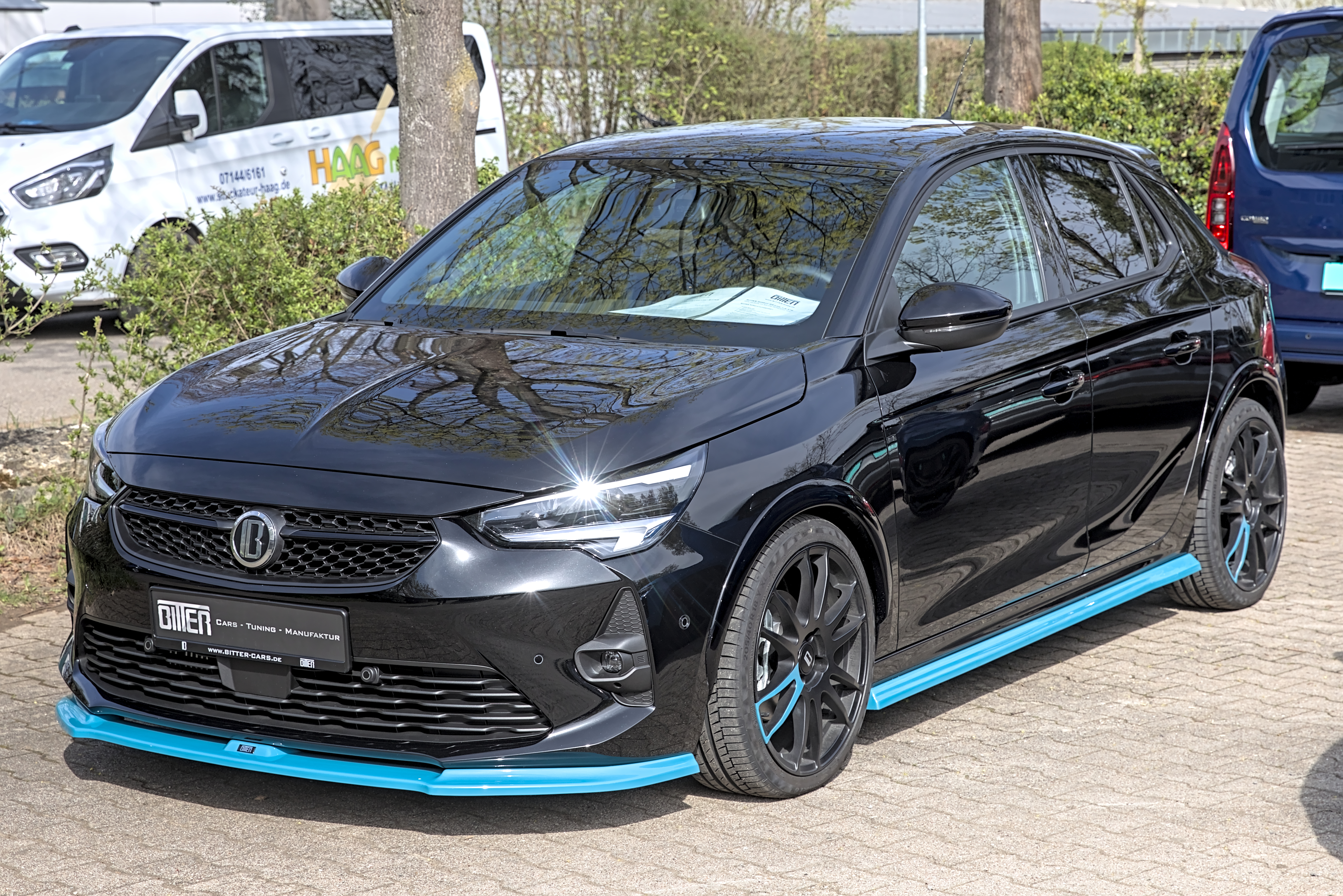
Bitter Corsa F

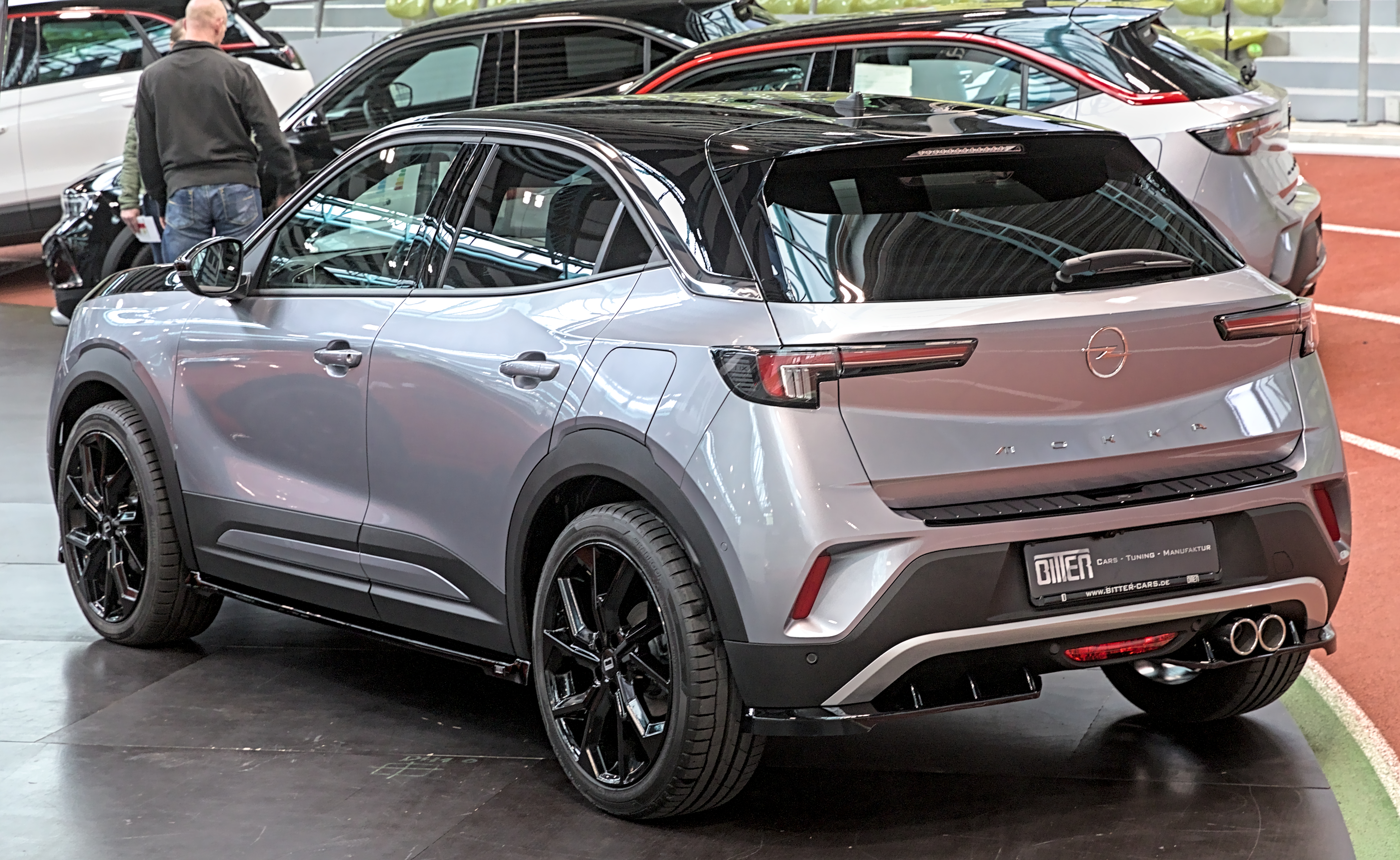
Bitter Mokka B

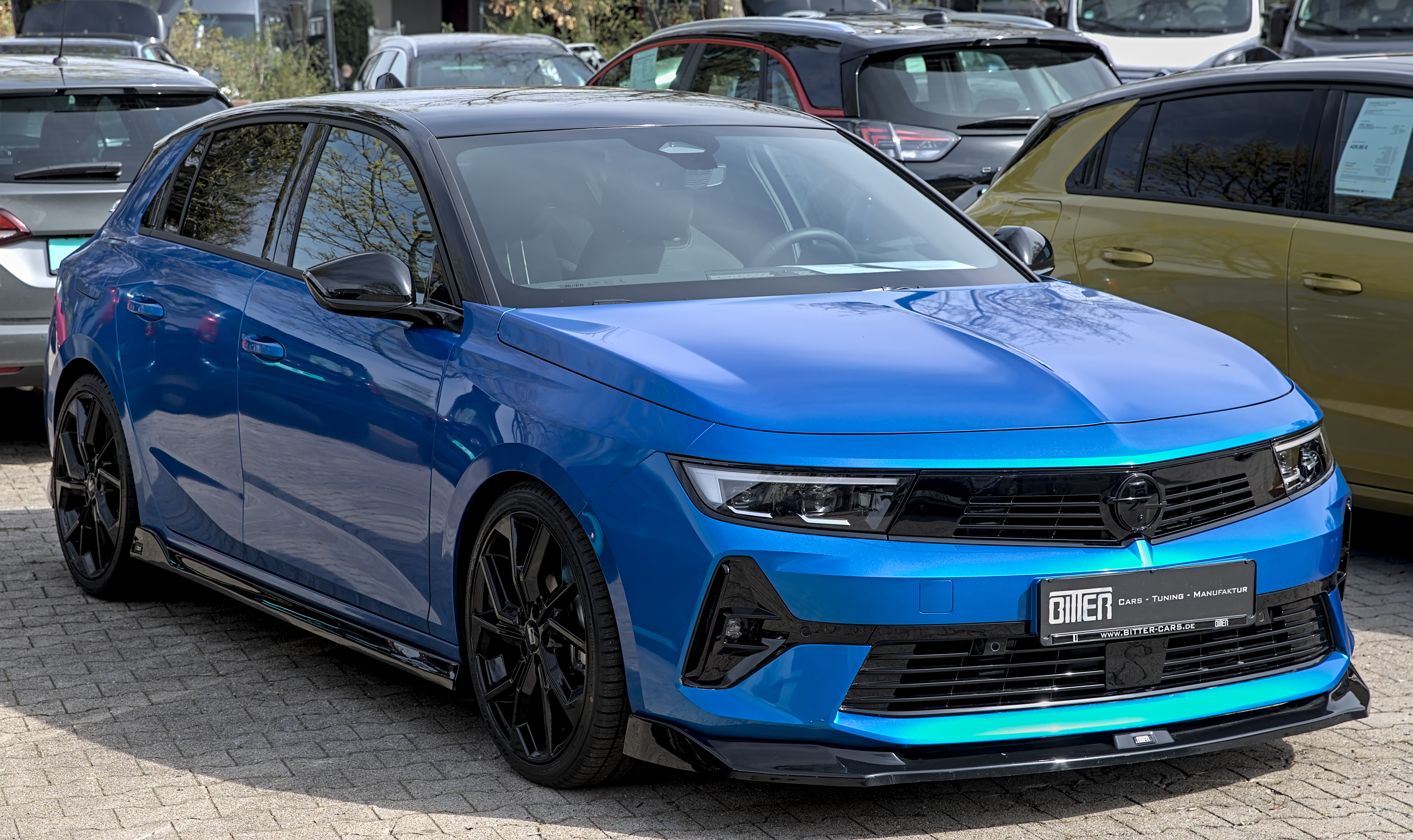
Bitter Astra L

== Prototypes and concepts ==
In addition to the series models, Bitter continued to present studies, some of which were even ready for series production. Despite repeated attempts, some of which were promising, he never managed to go into serial production again.

=== Bitter Blazer (1976) ===
The Bitter Blazer was a modification of the Chevrolet Blazer with a new, Europeanized front end, which was characterized by a horizontal radiator grille and light units from the Opel Admiral B. In addition, there was a refined interior. It followed the concept of the Monteverdi Safari . The vehicle remained a one-off.

=== Bitter Super Aero (1978) ===
The Super Aero was a compact two-seat sports car based on the Opel Kadett C.

=== Bitter Rallye GT (1984) ===
The Rallye GT was a compact two-seat sports car based on the Opel Manta. The vehicle had a Targa-style removable central roof panel and was developed by Bitter and Isdera . Erich Bitter predicted a sales price of DM 40,000. However, he refrained from series production because the supply of technical components was not secured in the long term.

=== Bitter Type 3 (1987) ===
The Bitter Type 3 was a 2+2 seater convertible introduced in 1988 as the successor to the SC and primarily intended for sale in the United States.

The technical basis was the Opel Omega A, with a floor pan shortened by 35 millimetres (1.4 in). Bitter designed the body himself; it featured pop-up headlights and the round taillights of the Chevrolet Corvette C4. A 3.0-litre six-cylinder from Opel provided motive power, the output of which was specified in a sales brochure as 177 PS (130 kW).

A total of five prototypes were made, with bodies built by CECOMP in Italy. The original prototype was equipped with the 3.9-liter, Mantzel-developed six-cylinder engine from the Bitter SC. The next four cars were fitted with the Omega's 3.0-liter engine.

Initially, it was planned to organize sales in the United States through the Isuzu dealer network, with consideration given to marketing the car as an Isuzu. The GM plans assumed that 10,000 units would be sold per year. At the end of 1988, the first American sales brochures were printed, but before production of the car could start, GM withdrew its plans. Nothing came of the Type 3 beyond the five prototypes, two of which still exist today. The other three were destroyed in crash tests.

=== Bitter Type 3 Sedan (1987) ===
Also based on the Opel Omega A, Bitter developed a four-door sedan whose lines essentially corresponded to those of the Type 3 convertible. Only a wooden model of the sedan was made.

=== Bitter Tasco (1991) ===
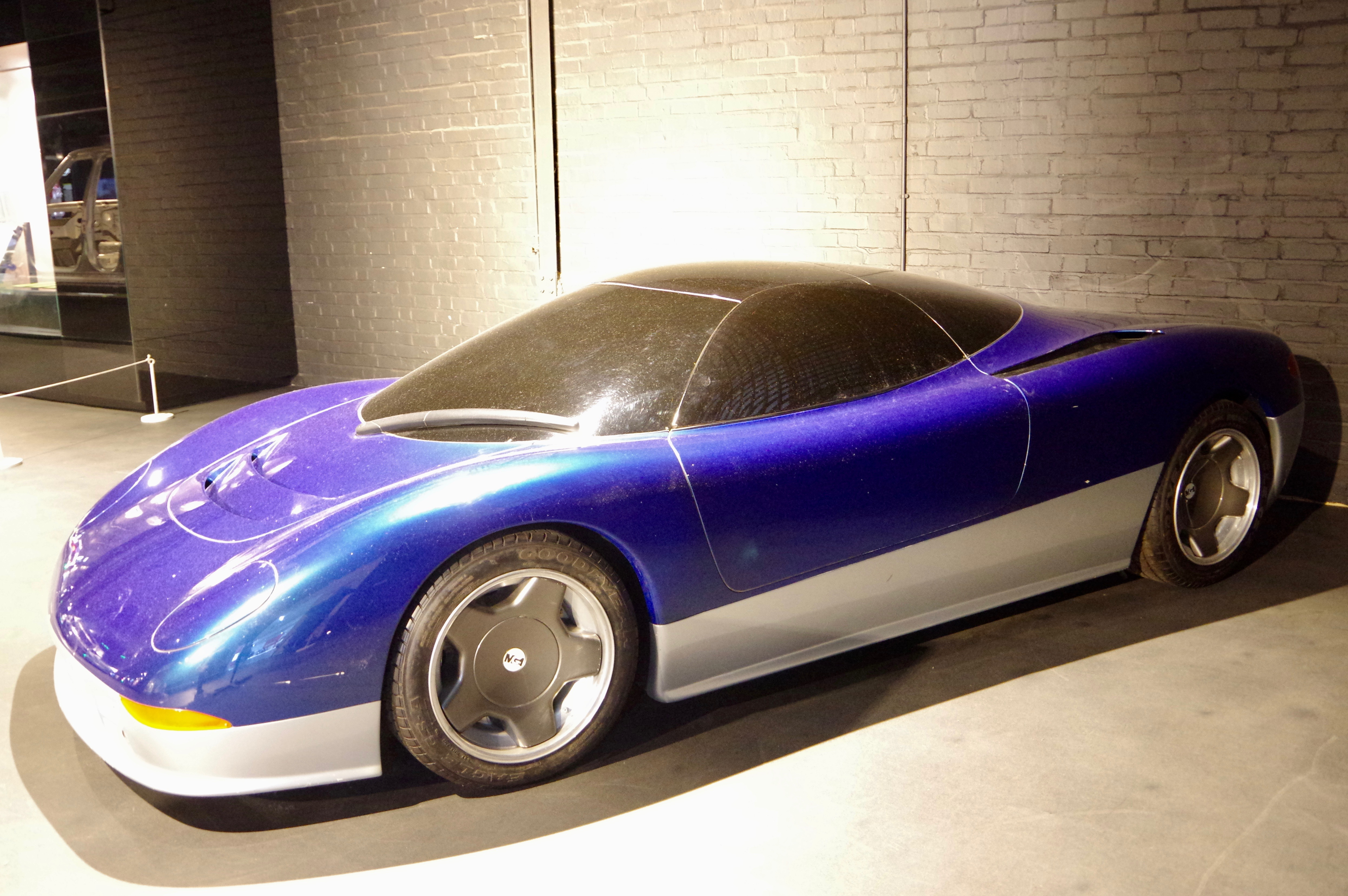
Bitter Tasco in the Coventry Transport Museum.

The Tasco was a two-seat, mid-engine, Chrysler powered sports car that Bitter developed with Japanese funding. The body was designed by Lawson Swinfield and the team at MGA Developments in Coventry. Series production did not materialize; only two copies of the Tasco were made.

=== Bitter Berlina (1994) ===
The Bitter Berlina was a four-door sports sedan based on the Opel Omega MV6, which basically resembled the Type 3 sedan. A sloping front section with folding headlights was striking. The rear lights of the Opel Calibra were used at the rear. There was only one prototype, presented at the 1994 Geneva Motor Show and constructed by an Italian coachbuilder Stola. The start of series production failed due to unsecured financing.

=== Bitter GT1 (1998) ===
The GT1 was a two-seat, mid-engine, sports car based on the Lotus Elise GT1.

=== Bitter CD II (2003) ===
In 2003, in an attempt to resume its small-scale production, Bitter presented a modern reincarnation of the CD, known as the CD II. The vehicle was presented at the Geneva Motor Show in 2004. A two-door hatchback coupé, it was based on the Australian-made Holden Monaro but was rumoured to feature a V12 engine. This may have referred to the GM Holden V12 Alloytec Project. Two prototypes were created; investors were sought but the car never reached full production. Bitter continued to pursue the concept of modifying powerful Australian GM vehicles for the European market with the Vero model.

== In popular culture ==
The Bitter SC was the subject of a sub-plot in episode 9 of season 6 of The Goldbergs, "Bachelor Party".
