= Brahmanwadi =

Village in Maharashtra

The 2011 Census of India lists two villages called Brahmanwadi in Mawal taluka, Pune district, in the state of Maharashtra. Both form a part of the Karanjgaon gram panchayat and are listed separately from the village of Brahman Wadi in the same taluka.

At the time of the census, one of the villages encompassed an area of 222.19 ha (549 acres). It comprised 145 households. The population of 834 was split between 410 males and 424 females. The other had an area of 223 ha (551 acres). It comprised 150 households. The population of 973 was split between 506 males and 467 females.

18.825856°N 73.542313°E

== See also ==
- List of villages in Mawal taluka
