= Apollo GT =

Defunct American motor vehicle manufacturer

Apollo
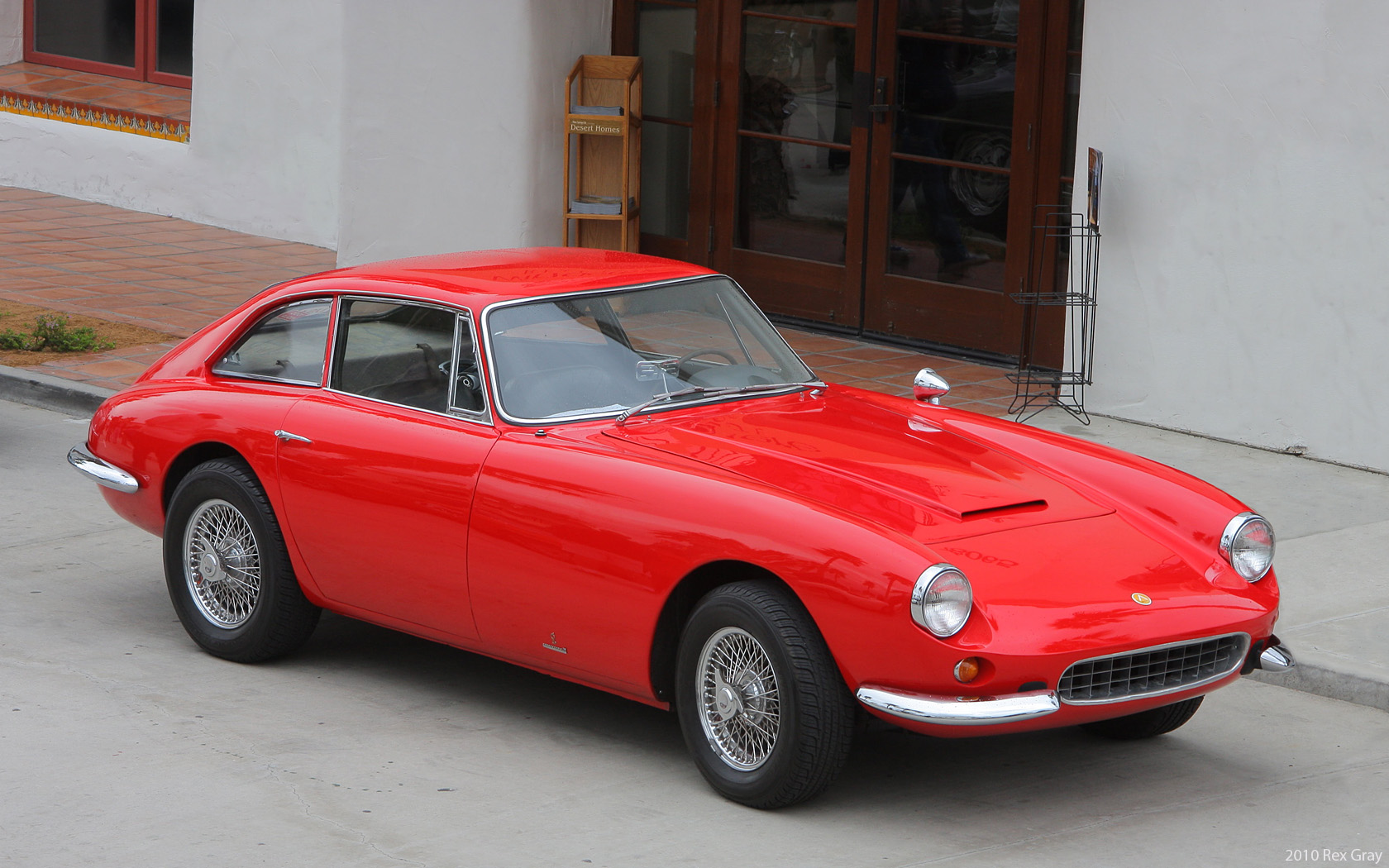
- 1965 Apollo 5000 GT Coupe

Overview
- Manufacturer: International Motor Cars
- Also called: Vetta Ventura
- Production: 1962 - 1964; 88 produced
- Model years: 1962 - 1965
- Assembly: Oakland, California, United States
- Designer: Ron Plescia, Franco Scaglione

Body and chassis
- Class: Sports car
- Body style: 2-door fastback coupe 2-door convertible

Powertrain
- Engine: 215 cu in (3.5 L) Buick V8 (gasoline); 300 cu in (4.9 L) Buick V8 (gasoline)
- Transmission: 4-speed manual 2-speed automatic

Dimensions
- Wheelbase: 2,464 mm (97.0 in)
- Length: 4,445 mm (175.0 in)
- Width: 1,676 mm (66.0 in)
- Height: 1,270 mm (50.0 in)
- Curb weight: 1,030 kg (2,271 lb)

The Apollo GT is an Italian-American sports car, initially marketed from 1962 to 1964 by International Motor Cars in Oakland, California.

Engineered by Milt Brown and designed by Ron Plescia, it featured handmade Italian bodywork and chassis by Intermeccanica, with a choice between two-seater convertible or fastback styles. Power came from a 215 cu in (3.5 L) or 300 cu in (4.9 L) Buick engine mated to a 4-speed manual.

The initial company completed assembly of 42 cars before suspending production while seeking new financing. IMC allowed the sale of Intermeccanica body/chassis units to Vanguard Motors in Dallas, Texas, to produce cars under the Vetta Ventura name. These were made until 1966 as a stop-gap measure to keep body producer Intermeccanica in business until new backers were found. Other production arrangements followed, assembling cars not completed by International.

A total of 88 cars have been produced to date by all entities.

== History ==
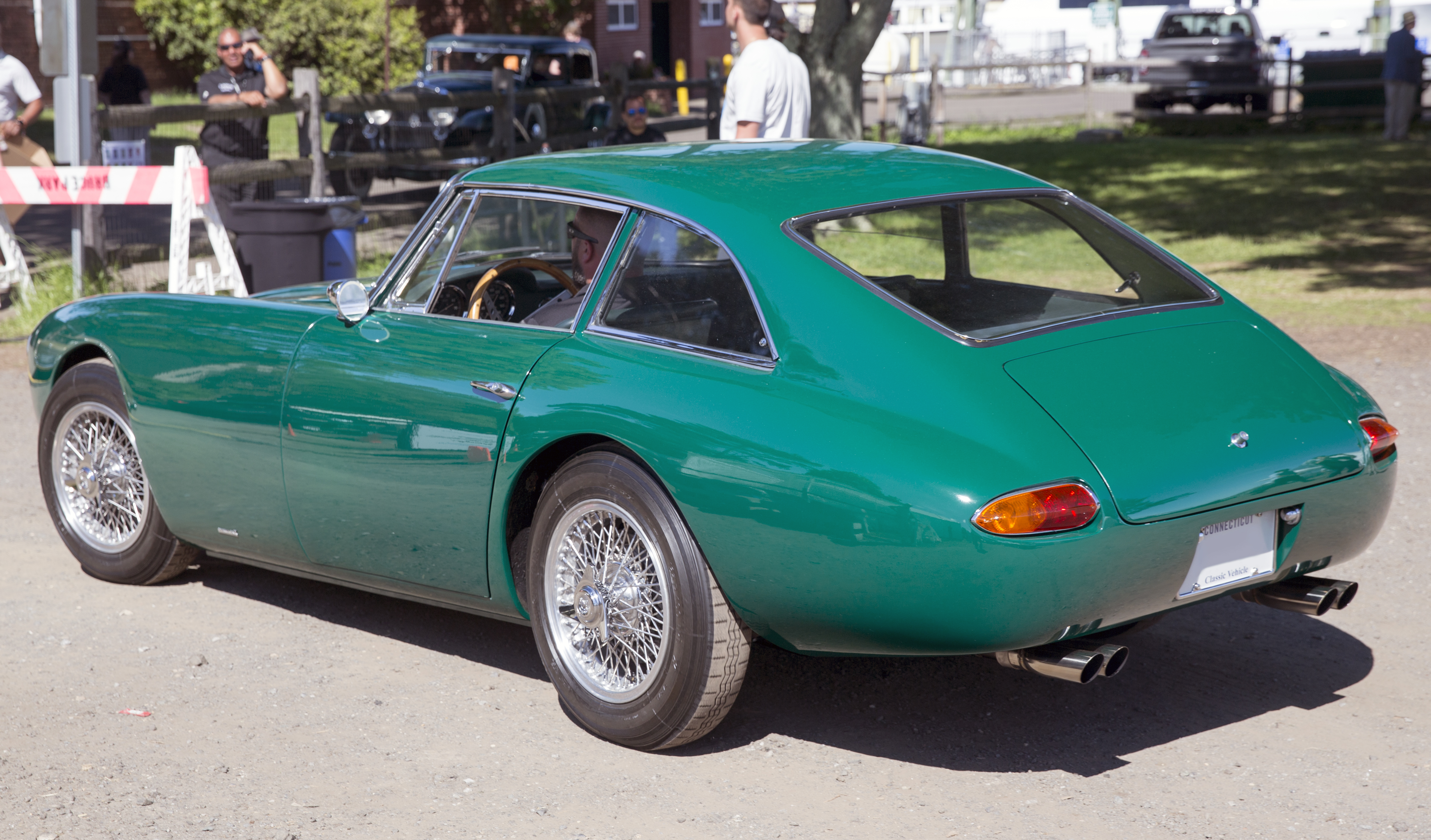
1965 Apollo 5000 GT

Frank Reisner, a former chemical engineer born in Hungary, raised in Canada and educated in America, established a company that later produced complete bodies—painted and trimmed—for the Apollo as well as the Texas-built Vetta Ventura (which was the same car with a different name). Reisner, on holiday in Italy in 1959, decided that he loved Turin and set up shop there as Intermeccanica producing tuning kits for Renaults, Peugeots, and Simcas.

The Apollo project was the dream of a young California engineer, Milt Brown, who desired to build an American answer to European GTs, such as the Aston Martin DB4 and Ferrari coupes. Brown, who was looking for a coachbuilder, met Reisner at the Monaco Grand Prix in 1960. A deal was made and the first Apollos were built by early 1963 by Brown's International Motor Cars. Intermeccanica hand formed and trimmed the bodies in Turin, Italy, and then shipped them by sea to Oakland, California, where the drive train was installed. The prototype's design was by Milt Brown's friend, Ron Plescia, but the nose was too long and the rear vision limited, so Reisner commissioned former Bertone stylist Franco Scaglione to revise it. The prototypes featured all aluminum bodies, but the production versions were mainly steel with aluminum hoods and doors.

The finished car, sold by Brown's International Motorcars of Oakland, was well received and had famous owners such as Pat Boone. The base price was $6000 and the top speed was claimed to be 150 mph (240 km/h).

A prototype 2 + 2 was shown in New York in 1965. It was shown again in 1966 as the Griffith GT.

International Motor Cars sold 42 cars (40 coupes and one spyder, including the prototype) before production stopped in mid-1964 due to lack of financing. IMC then made a contract with Reisner (to keep his operation going) allowing Intermeccanica to supply body/chassis units to Fred Ricketts, owner of Vanguard Industries, an aftermarket supplier of auto air conditioners in Dallas, Texas. Vanguard sold it as the Vetta Ventura. The intent was to give IMC time to find new financing as well as keep Intermeccanica alive.

Vanguard built only 11 cars, with shop foreman Tom Johnson purchasing the leftover 11 body/chassis units and completing them as late as 1971.

A third attempt to produce the Apollo was by attorney Robert Stevens. His Apollo International company of Pasadena, California completed only 14 cars, with foreman Otto Becker finishing another six. Four body chassis/units were never claimed by Apollo International and were sold by US Customs to Ken Dumiere.

A pair of Apollo 3500 GTs were used to portray the Thorndyke Special race car which was featured in The Love Bug, a 1968 Disney movie. One of the pair has been fully restored.

Following this venture, Intermeccanica decided to move all production in-house, rather than exporting rolling chassis' for completion. Reisner later developed projects such as the Griffith, the Murena GT, and the Italia by Intermeccanica. Intermeccanica went on to produce the Veltro 1500, the Griffin (which was a version of the prototype Apollo 2+2), the Phoenix, and the Omega among others.

=== Specifications ===
Engine	Max power	Transmission	Wheelbase	Length	Weight
215CID Buick V8	225 hp (168 kW)	4-speed manual	97 in (2,464 mm)	177 in (4,496 mm)	2,540 lb (1,150 kg)

=== In film ===
The Apollo GT features prominently in the 1968 film The Love Bug, referred to as "The Thorndyke Special" after antagonist Peter Thorndyke.
