= Karanjgaon, Mawal =

Village in Maharashtra

Karanjgaon
- Village
- Location in Maharashtra, India Karanjgaon (India)
- Coordinates: 18.8106985°N 73.5322666°E
- Country: India
- State: Maharashtra
- District: Pune
- Tehsil: Mawal

Government
  - Type: Panchayati Raj
  - Body: Gram panchayat

Area
  - Total: 321.15 ha (793.6 acres)

Population (2011)
  - Total: 900
  - Density: 280/km^{2} (730/sq mi)
- Sex ratio 475/425 ♂/♀

Languages
  - Official: Marathi
  - Other spoken: Hindi
- Time zone: UTC+5:30 (IST)
- Pin code: 410405
- Telephone code: 02114
- ISO 3166 code: IN-MH
- Vehicle registration: MH-14
- Website: pune.nic.in

Karanjgaon is a village and gram panchayat in India, situated in Mawal taluka of Pune district in the state of Maharashtra. It encompasses an area of 321.15 ha (794 acres).

== Administration ==
The village is administrated by a sarpanch, an elected representative who leads a gram panchayat. At the time of the 2011 Census of India, the village was the headquarters for the eponymous gram panchayat, which also governed the villages of Pale Nane Mawal and Moramarwadi, as well as two villages bearing the name Brahmanwadi.

== Demographics ==
At the 2011 census, the village comprised 174 households. The population of 900 was split between 475 males and 425 females.

== Air travel connectivity ==
The closest airport to the village is Pune Airport.

== See also ==
- List of villages in Mawal taluka
