= Brahman Wadi =

Village in Maharashtra

- Village
- Country: India
- State: Maharashtra
- District: Pune
- Tehsil: Mawal

Government
  - Type: Panchayati Raj
  - Body: Gram panchayat

Area
  - Total: 109.99 ha (271.8 acres)

Population (2011)
  - Total: 1,549
  - Density: 1,408/km^{2} (3,648/sq mi)
- Sex ratio 794 / 755 ♂/♀

Languages
  - Official: Marathi
  - Other spoken: Hindi
- Time zone: UTC+5:30 (IST)
- Telephone code: 02114
- ISO 3166 code: IN-MH
- Vehicle registration: MH-14
- Website: pune.nic.in

Brahman Wadi is a village in India, situated in Mawal taluka of Pune district in the state of Maharashtra. It encompasses an area of 109.99 ha (272 acres).

== Administration ==
The village is administrated by a sarpanch, an elected representative who leads a gram panchayat. At the time of the 2011 Census of India, the gram panchayat governed two villages and was based at Baur.

== Demographics ==
At the 2011 census, the village comprised 304 households. The population of 1549 was split between 794 males and 755 females.

== See also ==
- List of villages in Mawal taluka
