= Karajgaon =

Village in Maharashtra

- village
- Location in Maharashtra, India Karajgaon (India)
- Coordinates: 20.0861995°N 72.8323463°E
- Country: India
- State: Maharashtra
- District: Palghar
- Taluka: Talasari
- Elevation: 82 m (269 ft)

Population (2011)
  - Total: 1,849
- Time zone: UTC+5:30 (IST)
- 2011 census code: 551562

Karajgaon is a village in the Palghar district of Maharashtra, India. It is located in the Talasari taluka.

== Demographics ==
According to the 2011 census of India, Karajgaon has 338 households. The effective literacy rate (i.e. the literacy rate of population excluding children aged 6 and below) is 35.91%.

Demographics (2011 Census)
	Total	Male	Female
Population	1849	907	942
Children aged below 6 years	412	202	210
Scheduled caste	0	0	0
Scheduled tribe	1834	901	933
Literates	516	331	185
Workers (all)	631	481	150
Main workers (total)	578	446	132
Main workers: Cultivators	326	267	59
Main workers: Agricultural labourers	174	129	45
Main workers: Household industry workers	7	6	1
Main workers: Other	71	44	27
Marginal workers (total)	53	35	18
Marginal workers: Cultivators	3	2	1
Marginal workers: Agricultural labourers	19	10	9
Marginal workers: Household industry workers	2	1	1
Marginal workers: Others	29	22	7
Non-workers	1218	426	792
