= Baur (surname) =

Baur is a German surname, a cognate of Bauer, 'farmer' . Notable people with this surname include:

- A. C. Baur (1900–1931), American football player and stock broker
- Alfred Baur, Swiss collector of Asian art
- Eleonore Baur (1885–1981), nurse and only woman to participate in Munich Beer Hall Putsch
- Erwin Baur (1875–1933), German geneticist and botanist
- Esperanza Baur (1920–1961), Mexican actress, 2nd wife of John Wayne
- Ferdinand Christian Baur, (1792–1860), German theologian and leader of the Tübingen school of theology
- Fred Baur (1918–2008), United States chemist and food storage technician
- Frances Joan Baur (1920–1990), better known as Nina Bara, American actress
- Gene Baur (born 1962), activist, president and co-founder of Farm Sanctuary
- Georg Baur, German-American zoologist and paleontologist
- Georg Baur (politician) (1895–1975), German politician
- Goffredo Baur, Italian cross country skier
- Gracia Baur (born 1982), German singer
- Hans Baur, (1897–1993), Adolf Hitler's personal pilot
- Harry Baur (1880–1943), French actor
- Johann Wilhelm Baur (1607–1640), German engraver, etcher and miniature painter
- Jürg Baur, (1918–2010), German composer
- Karl Baur (1911–1963), Chief Test Pilot for the Messerschmitt Company
- Konrad Baur (born 1988), German politician
- Markus Baur (born 1971), German handball player
- Michael Baur (born 1969), Austrian football player
- Mieke Andela-Baur (1923–2016), Dutch politician
- Patrick Baur (born 1965), German tennis player
- Valentin Baur (1891–1971), German politician
- Wolfgang Baur, U.S. games designer
