= Erich Bitter =

German automobile designer (1933–2023)

Erich Bitter (11 August 1933 – 10 July 2023) was a German automobile designer, road racing cyclist, and automobile racer. He was the founder of Bitter Automotive.

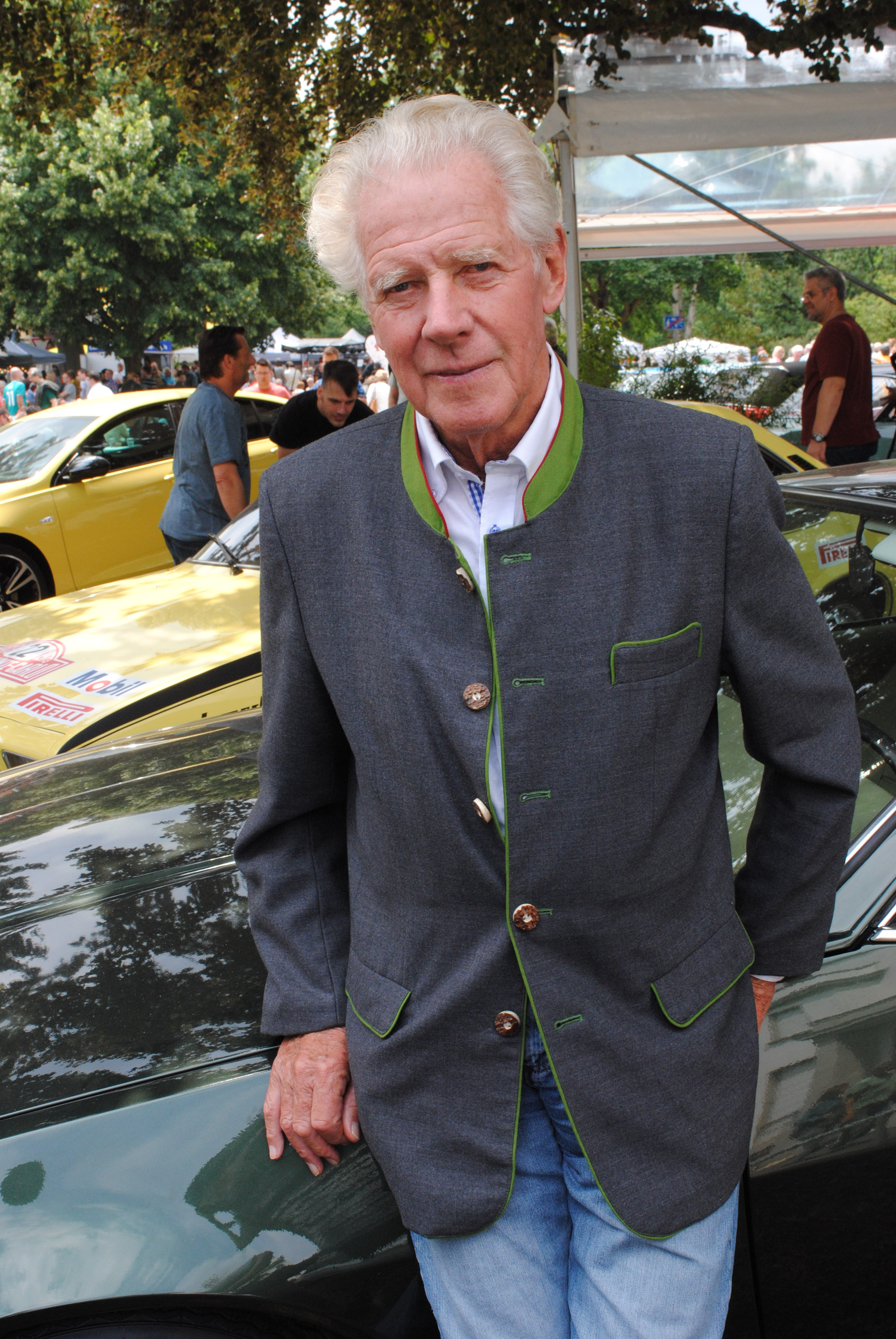
Bitter in 2018
