= Bajauniyahaldu =

Village in Uttarakhand, India

- Interactive map of Bajauniyahaldu
- Coordinates: 29.4522°N 79.2619°E
- Country: India Uttarakhand
- Named for: Haldu tree

Government
  - Type: Democratic
  - Body: Grampanchayat

Area
  - Total: 20 km^{2} (7.7 sq mi)
- Elevation: 590 m (1,920 ft)

Population (2001)
  - Total: 1,128
  - Density: 56/km^{2} (150/sq mi)

Languages
  - Official: Hindi
- Time zone: UTC+5:30 (IST)
- Postal code: 263159
- Vehicle registration: UK 04
- Website: uk.gov.in

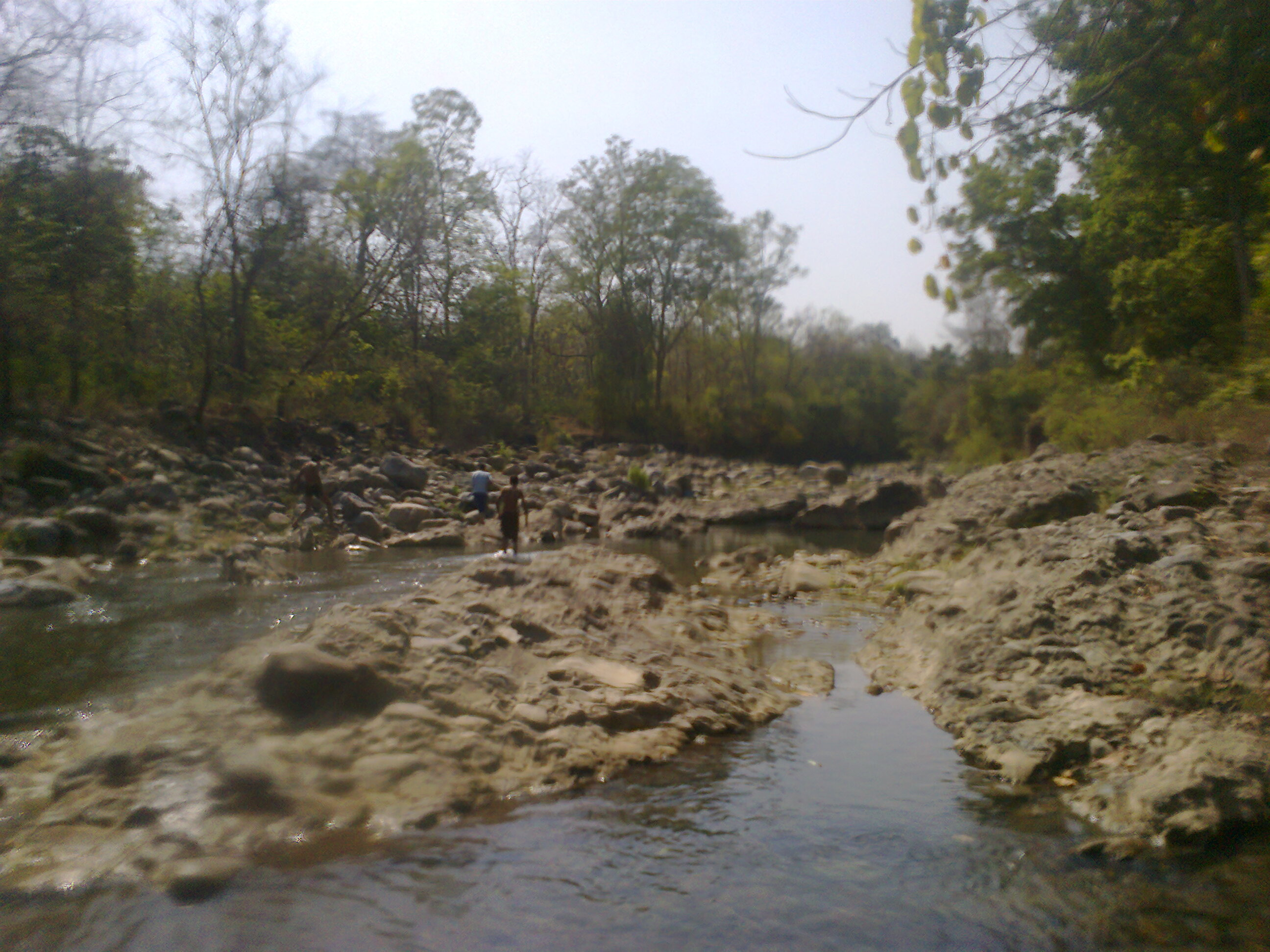
Baur River

Bajauniyahaldu is a village in the foothills of Nainital district. Also known as Bajuniya haldu

== Etymology ==
Bajauniyahaldu name is originated from the plant Haldu (Haldina).

== Location ==
The place is famous for Rajkiya Inter College. It is surrounded by dense forest and runs parallel to Baur River. Its population is nearly 1,128 as of 2009. It has many educational institutes both government and private e.g. Rajkiya Inter College, JNG Public School, Sunrise Public School and Educamp.

Literacy rate is 89%, which is higher than the national average. The male literacy rate is 97.28% and the female literacy rate is 81.25%.

== Economy ==
The village is famous for its agricultural and dairy products. The majority of population is involved in farming. Wheat, rice, millet, tomato, and various other vegetables are produced year round. It is one of the chief producers of tomatoes, which are exported to other Asian countries.

== Languages ==
Kumaoni (पहाड़ी) is the most widely spoken language. Hindi is the next most common.

== Nearby places ==
Bajauniyahaldu is 36 km away from the Kathgodam railway station. Haldwani is 34 km by road. The nearest airport is Pantnagar Airport 75 km away.

== Gallery ==
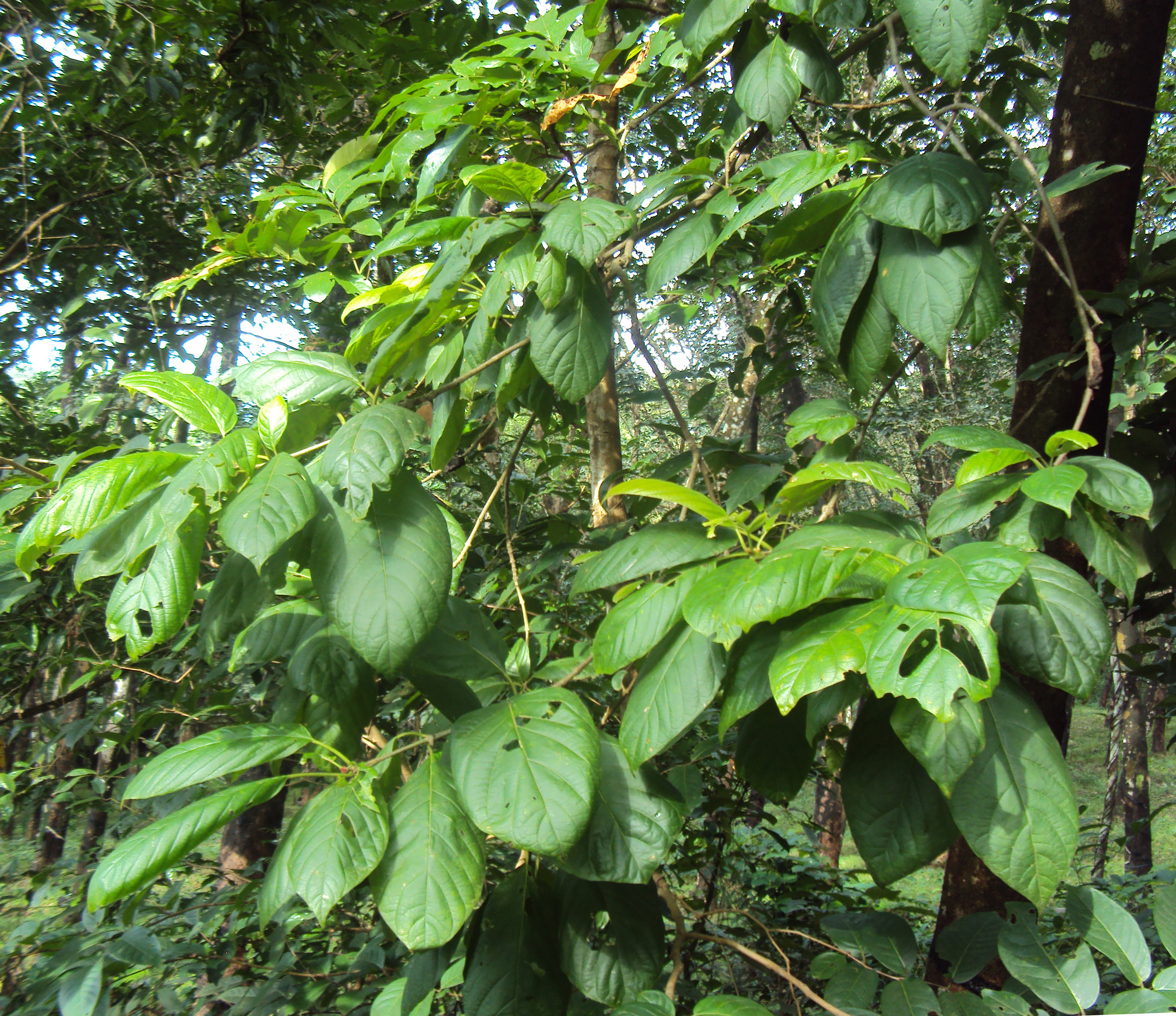
A haldu plant

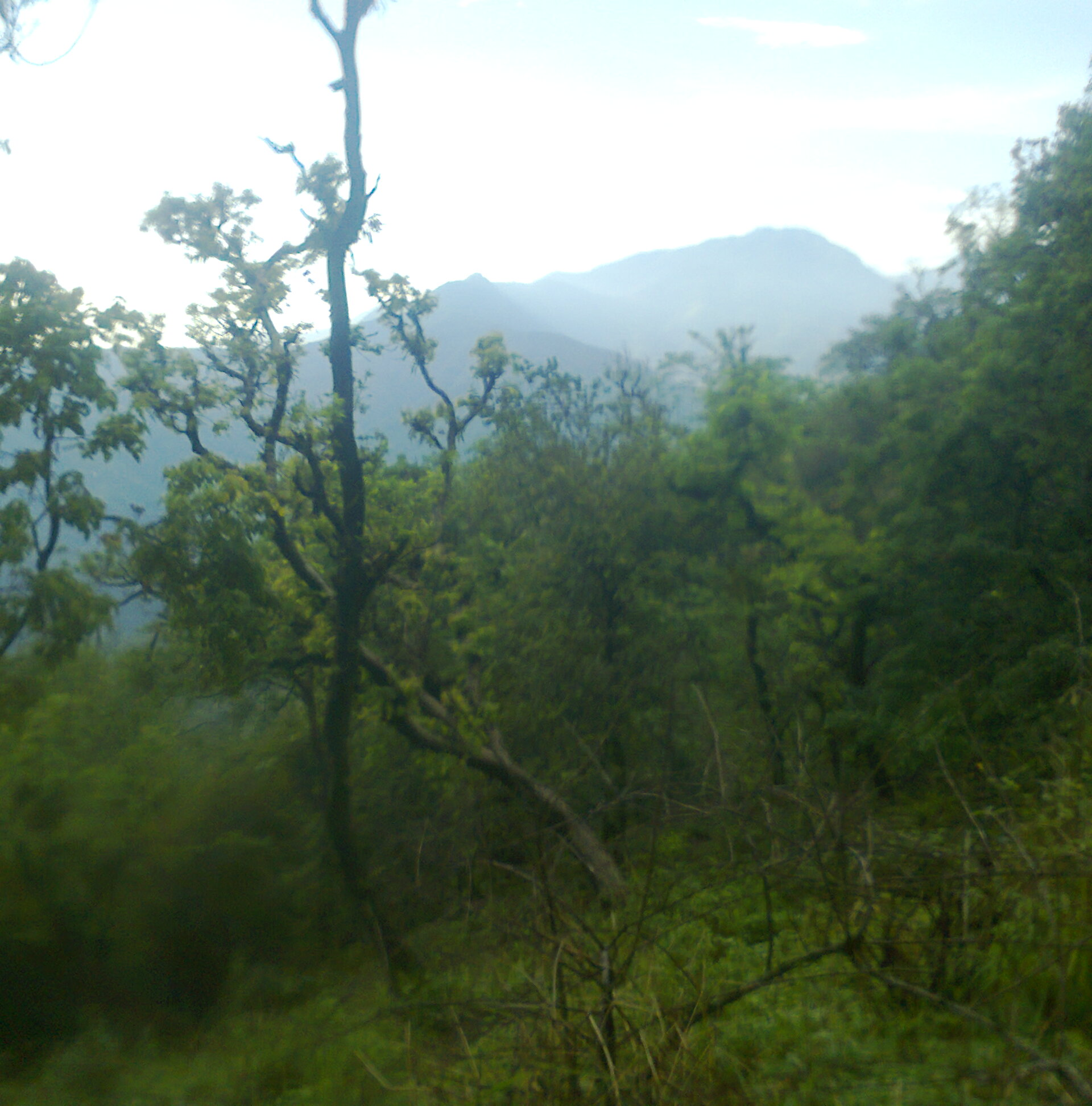
Dense forest covers village from all directions

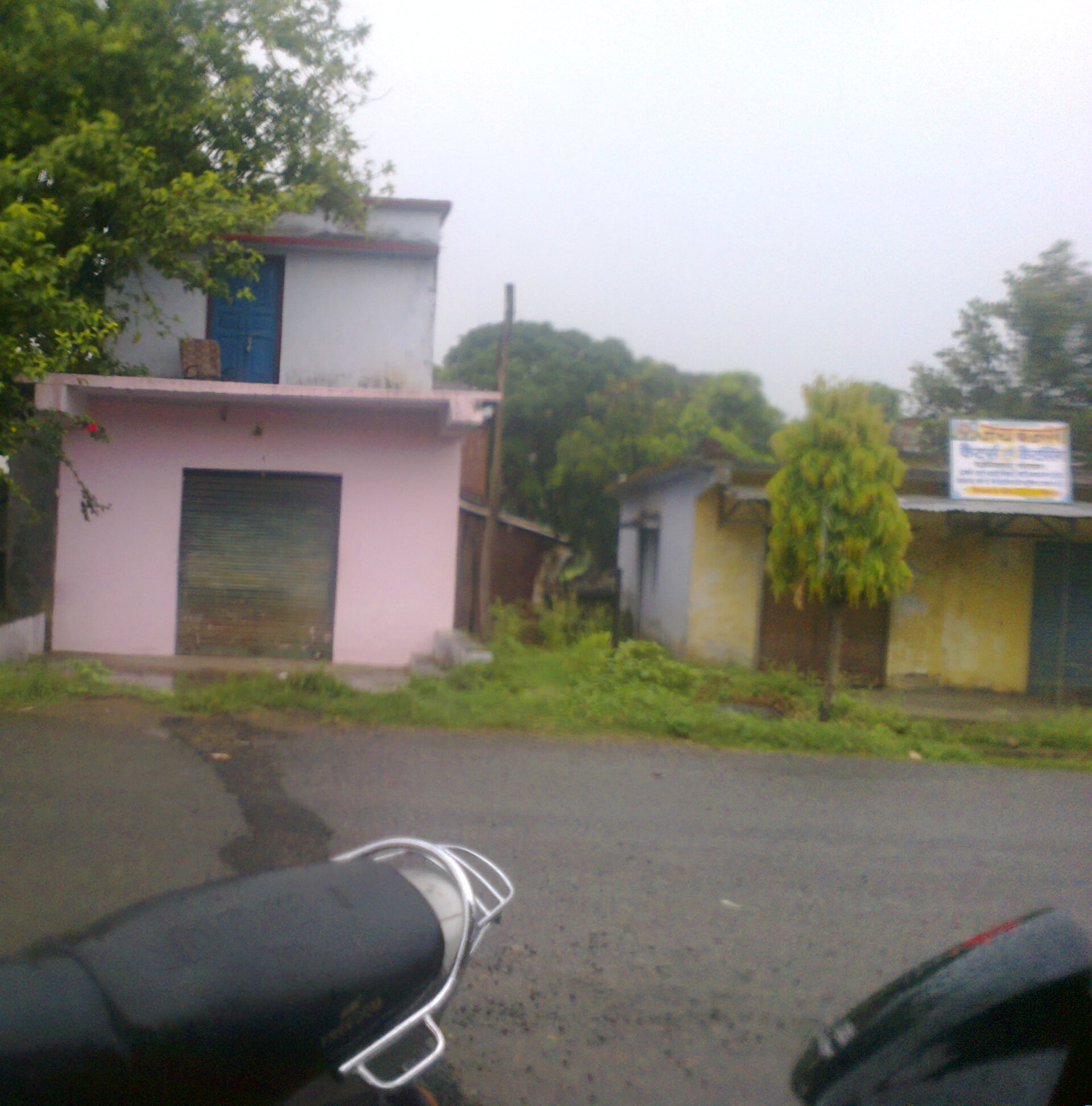
Bajauniyahaldu street view
