= Karosserie Baur =

Automobile coachbuilder

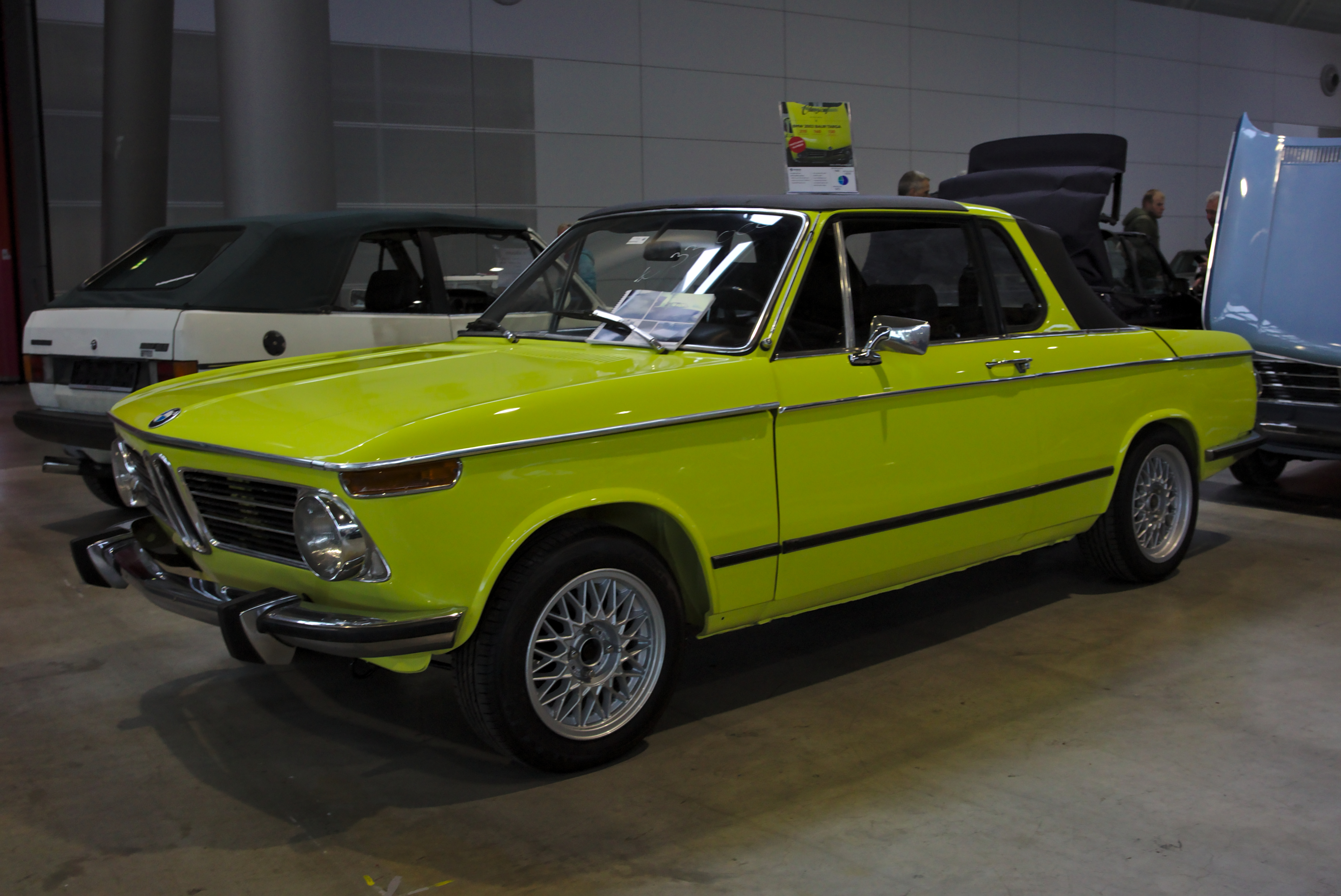
BMW 02 Baur-Cabrio

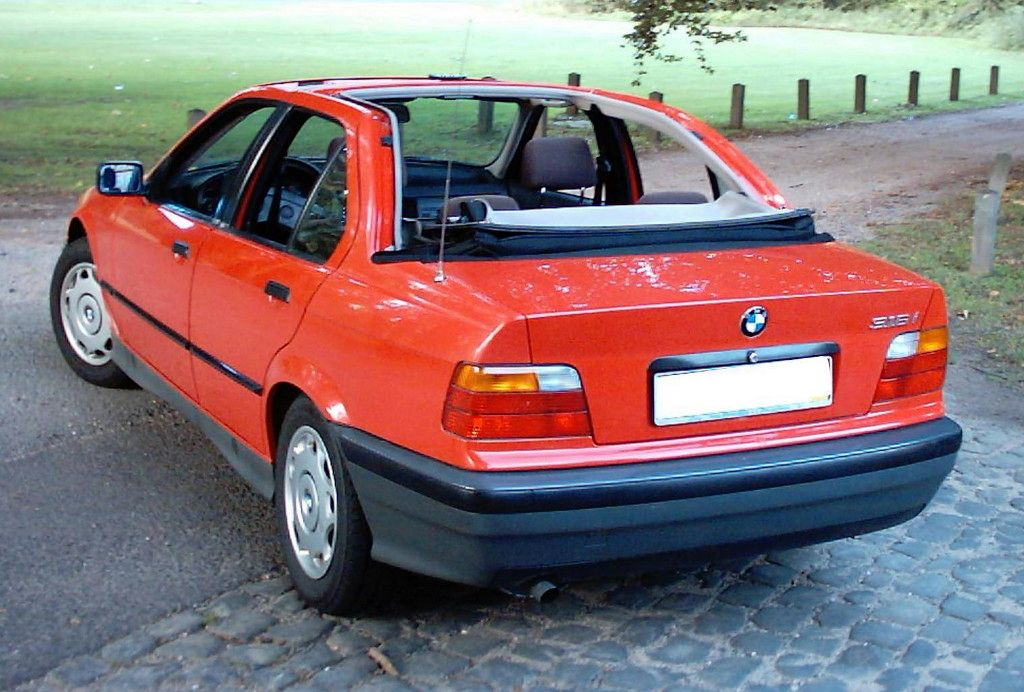
A BMW Baur Landaulet TC4

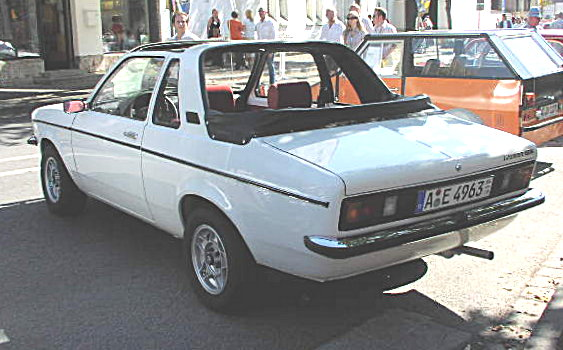
An Opel Kadett C 1.2 Aero

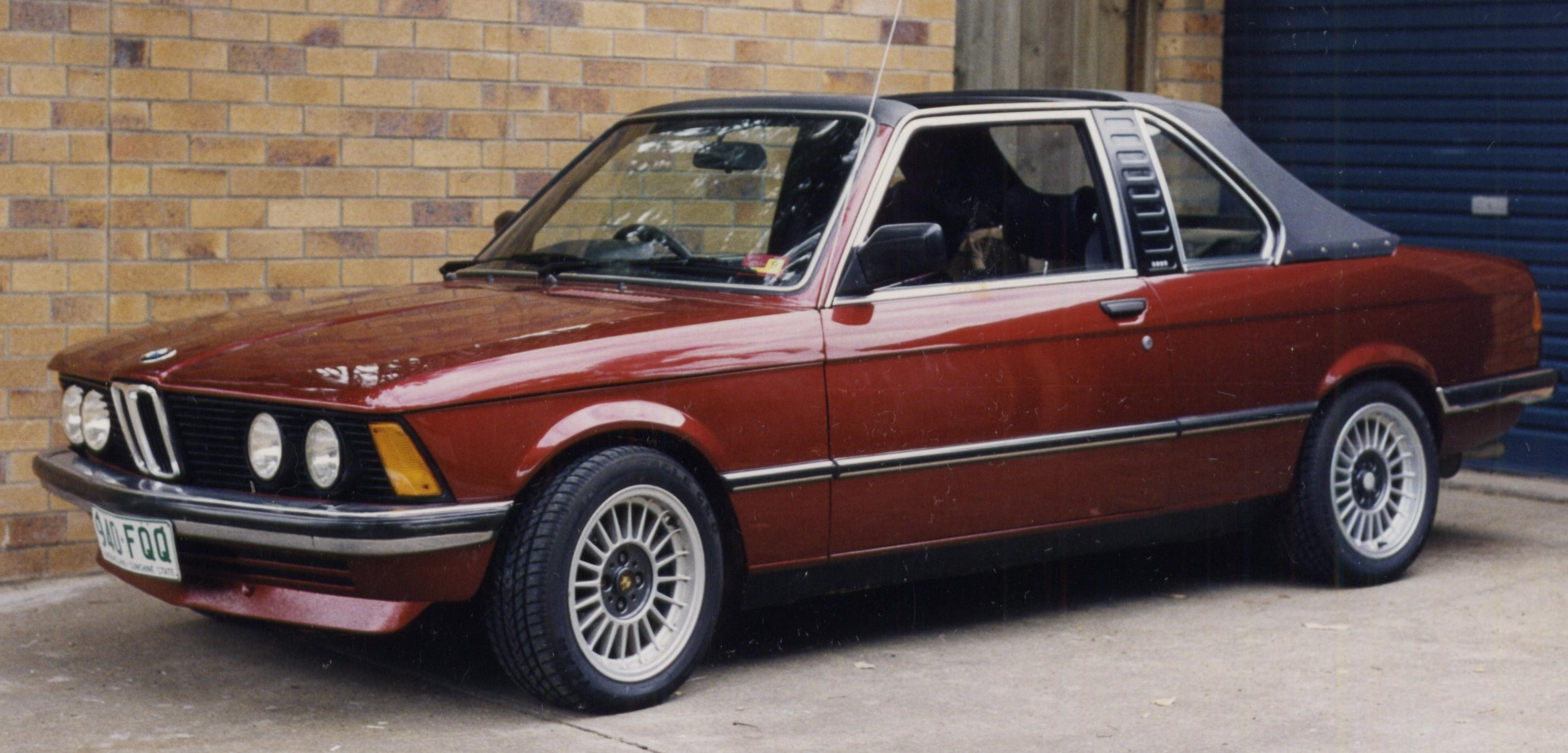
BMW E21 320/6 Baur TC1

Baur is a Karosserie or coachbuilder in Stuttgart, Germany, which has been building BMW convertibles since the 1930s. Currently, they are the body and assembly works for IVM Automotive, a member of the Ed Group. They have done prototype work for manufacturers such as Porsche, Audi and Ford.

The Baur family received a patent for the design of a folding top for luxury automobiles around the time BMW was building the first car with the BMW name.

Baur was established in 1910 and produced, among others, 1,682 1600-2 Cabriolets, 2,517 2002 Cabriolets, 2,592 E110 700 Sport Cabriolets, and most of the 450 or so M1's (after Lamborghini was unable to fulfil its contractual obligations).

In 1971 they began production of the safer "Targa-style" body with the 2002. (Targa was a registered Porsche name, so they had to call it something else.) Originally an aftermarket option available through BMW dealers, the E21 3 Series TC1 was built with full factory authorization, and covered under the factory warranty. The roll-bar version or "Top Cabrio" (TC) continued with the E30 TC2 even after Baur developed the BMW E30 Convertible design for BMW, and which BMW built.

The Opel Kadett C Aero was produced from 1976 to 1978, with a Baur top. Then there was the Baur TC3 of 1987, which was stopped by the production of the BMW Z1. The cars were aimed at the same market.

Even though BMW now had its own E36 convertible, E36 Baur TC4 conversions were still available, although this iteration was based on the E36 four-door and featured fixed door frames.

The TC through TC4 cars can be built at any time, on an aftermarket basis; the owner supplies the car to be converted.

All Porsche 959s were actually produced at Baur, not at Porsche, on an assembly line with Porsche inspectors overseeing the finished bodies. Most of Porsche's special-order interior leatherwork was also done by the workers at Baur.

At one time all suspension components for the Audi Quattro suspension unique to that model were produced by robotic welding equipment at Baur.

In 2002, the Baur G-Cabrio XL, a convertible based on the Mercedes-Benz G-Class, was shown at the Geneva Auto Show.
