= Political families of Maharashtra =

Maharashtra dynastic politics

Although India is a parliamentary democracy, the country's politics has increasingly become dynastic, possibly due to the absence of effective party organizations, independent civil society associations that mobilize support for a party, and centralized financing of elections. Family members have led the Indian National Congress for most of the period since 1978 when Indira Gandhi floated the then Congress(I) faction of the party. It also is fairly common in many political parties in Maharashtra. The dynastic phenomenon is seen from national level down to district level and even village level. The three-tier structure of Panchayati Raj established in the 1960s also helped to create and consolidate the dynastic phenomenon in rural areas. Apart from government, political families also control cooperative institutions, mainly cooperative sugar factories, district cooperative banks in the state, and since the 1980s private for profit colleges. The ruling Bharatiya Janata Party also features several senior leaders who are dynasts. In Maharashtra, the NCP has particularly high level of dynasticism.

Below is a partial list of the political families of Maharashtra state in India.

== A ==
=== The Ambedkar Family ===
- B. R. Ambedkar (1891 - 1956) - The Chairman of Drafting Committee of the Constitution of India, 1st Minister of Law and Justice, Member of Parliament (Rajya Sabha), Labour Member of Viceroy's Executive Council, Leader of the Opposition in the Bombay Legislative Assembly and Member of the Bombay Legislative Council.
  - Yashwant Ambedkar (1912 - 1977) - Son of B. R. Ambedkar, leader of Republican Party of India and a member of the Maharashtra Legislative Council.
    - Prakash Ambedkar - Son of Yashwant Ambedkar, leader of the Vanchit Bahujan Aaghadi, and the former Member of the Parliament (Lok Sabha and Rajya Sabha).
      - Sujat Ambedkar - Son of Prakash Ambedkar, Activist and Leader of the Vanchit Bahujan Aghadi.
    - Anandraj Ambedkar - Son of Yashwant Ambedkar, Leader of Republican Sena.

== B ==
=== The Bhosale Family, Satara ===
▪ Udayanraje Bhosale, Former Minister of State in Maharashtra Government. BJP Member of Satara Lok Sabha

▪ Shivendrasinghraje Bhosale, Member of Legislative Assembly, Minister Of Public Works Government Of Maharashtra

=== The Bhujbal Family ===
- Chhagan Bhujbal - Member of NCP and Former Deputy Chief Minister of Maharashtra
  - Pankaj Bhujbal - Son of Chhagan Bhujbal. Member of Maharashtra Legislative Council
  - Sameer Bhujbal - Nephew of Chhagan Bhujbal. Member of Maharashtra Legislative Assembly form Nashik (Vidhan Sabha constituency)

=== The Bhumre Family, Paithan ===
- Sandipanrao Bhumre - Cabinet minister of Maharashtra, member of Maharashtra legislative assembly.
  - Vilas Sandipan Bhumre, Member of Maharashtra Legislative Assembly former Chairman of Zilla Parishad, Chairman of Renuka Devi Sharad Sahakari Karkhana, Paithan.

== C ==
=== The Chavan Family (of Dajisaheb) ===
- Dajisaheb Chavan (1916 – 1973) - Union Deputy Minister for Defence and Law.
- Premala Chavan (1918 – 2003) - Wife of Dajisaheb Chavan. Member of the Lok Sabha and the Rajya Sabha
  - Prithviraj Chavan - Son of Dajisaheb Chavan. 16th Chief Minister of Maharashtra

=== The Chavan Family (of Shankarrao) ===
- Shankarrao Chavan (1920 – 2004)- Union Minister of Finance and Home Affairs and 4th Chief Minister of Maharashtra
  - Ashok Chavan - Son of Shankarrao Chavan. 15th Chief Minister of Maharashtra
  - Ameeta Ashokrao Chavan - Daughter-in-law of Shankarrao Chavan. Member of Maharashtra Legislative Assembly from Bhokar
  - Sreejaya Chavan - Daughter of Former MLA & former Chief minister of Maharashtra Ashok Chavan and Currently Member of Maharashtra Legislative Assembly from Bhokar

== D ==
=== The Dange Family ===
- Shripad Amrit Dange - Founding member of the Communist Party of India
  - Roza Vidyadhar Deshpande - Daughter of Shripad Dange and Member of Parliament from Mumbai North Central

=== The Dandavate Family ===
- Madhu Dandavate - Deputy Chairman of the Planning Commission, Minister of Finance, Minister of Railways
- Pramila Dandavate - Member of Parliament from Mumbai North Central

=== The Danve Family ===
- Raosaheb Danve - Former President of BJP Maharashtra & Ex. Member of Parliament Lok Sabha from Jalna Constituency
  - Santosh Danve - MLA from Bhokardan Assembly constituency.
  - Sanjana Jadhav - MLA from Kannad Assembly constituency.

=== The Deshmukh Family ===
- Vilasrao Deshmukh (1945 – August 2012) - MP in the Rajya Sabha, Indian Minister of Science & Technology and Minister of Earth Sciences, former Minister of Heavy Industries and Public Enterprises, former Minister of Rural Development and Minister of Panchayati Raj, Former Chief Minister of Maharashtra for 2 Terms -
  - Amit Deshmukh, son of Vilasrao Deshmukh - Cabinet Minister & Guardian Minister of Latur.
  - Dhiraj Deshmukh; third son of Vilasrao Deshmukh and Younger brother of Amit Deshmukh - Member of Legislative Assembly Latur Rural Constituency
- Diliprao Deshmukh; Younger Brother Of Vilasrao Deshmukh - Former Minister For Sports Maharashtra Government & Guardian Minister For Latur and also served as Member of Maharashtra legislative council.
  - Gaurawi Deshmukh Bhosale - Only Daughter of Diliprao Deshmukh and wife of Politician & MLA Atulbaba Suresh Bhosale

=== The Deora Family ===
- Murli Deora Former Cabinet Minister Central Government
  - Milind Deora Former Minister of Central Government, Son of Murli Deora

=== The Dutt Family ===
- Sunil Dutt Ex. Member of Parliament Lok Sabha
  - Priya Dutt Ex. Member of Parliament, daughter of Sunil Dutt

=== The Desai Family (of Satara) ===
- Balasaheb Desai Ex. Home Minister, Maharashtra
  - Shambhuraj Desai; Grandson of Balasaheb Desai Cabinate Minister, Maharashtra

== G ==
=== The Gadakh Family ===
- Yashwantrao Gadakh Patil - is a veteran leader of Nationalist Congress Party from Maharashtra. He served as Member of Parliament for 3 terms, also served as Member of legislative council.
  - Shankarrao Gadakh - former Cabinet Minister of Government of Maharashtra. He was elected as an independent Member of the legislative assembly in 2019 for the second time, and later announced his support to Shivsena.

=== The Gaikwad Family (of Eknath) ===
- Eknath Gaikwad - MP in the Lok Sabha
  - Varsha Gaikwad – current MP in the 18th Lok Sabha (2024-2029). She was a four term Member of the Maharashtra Legislative Assembly (2004-2024)
  - Jyoti Gaikwad, a member of the Maharashtra Legislative Assembly from 2024, representing Dharavi Assembly constituency.

=== The Gavai Family ===
- R. S. Gavai - Governor, MP (Lok Sabha & Rajya Sabha), MLC
  - Rajendra Gavai – Son of R. S. Gavai and President of Republican Party of India (Gavai)

=== The Gholap Family ===
- Babanrao Gholap - Cabinet Minister of Social Welfare in Maharashtra Government
  - Yogesh Gholap - Son of Babanrao. Member of the 13th Maharashtra Legislative Assembly from Deolali Vidhan Sabha constituency as member of Shiv Sena

== F ==
=== The Farooqui Family ===
- Kamaal Farooqui - Former Minister rank and senior Indian National Congress leader
  - Umar Kamaal Farooqui - Barrister, ex State Spokesperson of Nationalist Congress Party and Indian National Congress leader
    - Ali Kamaal Farooqui - Policy strategist and advisor on International Affairs

== K ==
=== The Khadse Family, Jalgaon ===
- Eknath Khadse, Former Agriculture Minister of Maharashtra. Currently in NCP
  - Raksha Khadse, Daughter-in-law of Eknath Khadse, BJP MP from Raver constituency Current UNION MINISTER OF STATE.
  - Rohini Khadse-Khewalkar, only Daughter of Eknath Khadse, currently leader of NCP(SP) and the president of its women wing.

=== The Khan Family, Parbhani ===
- Abdul Rahman Khan, Former member of Bombay Legislative Council, Maharashtra Legislative Assembly and Maharashtra Legislative Council
  - Irfan ur Rahman Khan, Son of Abdul Rahman Khan, Ex Secretary of Maharashtra Pradesh Congress Committee and Ex Vice President of Maharashtra Youth Congress

=== The Khatal Patil Family, Sangamner ===
- B.J.Khatal-Patil, Former Minister of State for Co-operation, Planning etc and Minister of Cabinet for Law & Judiciary, Food & Civil Supplies, Irrigation, PWD, Revenue etc and Congress Member for Maharashtra Legislative Assembly.
  - Vikramsinh Satish Khatal Patil, grandson of Mr B. J. Khatal-Patil is now socially and politically active from the family.

=== The Kshirsagar Family, Beed ===
- Kesharbai Kshirsagar, Former Member of Parliament, Lok Sabha and Maharashtra Legislative Assembly
  - Jaydattaji Kshirsagar, son of Kesharbai Kshirsagar, Former Minister of public works department and a former Shivsena member of Maharashtra Legislative Assembly
  - Sandeep Kshirsagar, grandson of Kesharbai Kshirsagar, MLA from Beed Assembly constituency.

== M ==
=== The Mohite Family, Solapur ===
- Shankarrao Mohite-Patil - Member of the Bombay State Legislative Assembly from 1952 to 1960 as well as in Maharashtra Legislative Assembly from 1960 to 1972
  - Vijaysinh Mohite–Patil - Son of Shankarao. Former Deputy Chief Minister of Maharashtra State.
    - Ranjitsinh Mohite-Patil - Son of Vijaysinh. Former Member of Rajya Sabha.
  - Pratapsinh Mohite-Patil - Minister for Cooperation in the Shiv Sena-led state government in the late-90s under Narayan Rane as well as member of 13th Lok Sabha from Solapur.
  - Dhairyasheel Mohite-Patil - Son of Rajsinh Mohite Patil & brother of Vijaysinh Mohite–Patil and Dhairyasheel Mohite Patil is currently serving as Member of Parliament from Madha Lok Sabha in Maharashtra.

=== The Mahadik Family, Kolhapur ===
- Mahadevrao Mahadik alias Appa Mahadik - Former Member of Maharashtra Legislative Council for 3 continuous terms.
  - Amal Mahadik - Son of Appa Mahadik. MLA from Kolhapur South (2014 to 2019) and re-elected again in 2024 election.
  - Dhananjay Mahadik - Nephew of Appa Mahadik - Former Member of Parliament Kolhapur (2014 to 2019), currently Member of Parliament Rajya Sabha from Maharashtra.

=== The Mahajan Family ===
- Pramod Mahajan (1949 – 2006) - Parliamentary affairs minister in Atal Bihari Vajpayee government
  - Poonam Mahajan - Daughter of Pramod Mahajan. BJP member of Parliament from Mumbai North Central

=== The Munde Family ===
- Gopinath Munde (1949-2014) - Deputy Chief Minister of Maharashtra, Union Minister for Rural Development and Panchayati Raj in Narendra Modi's Cabinet. Brother-in-law of Pramod Mahajan
  - Pankaja Munde - Daughter of Gopinath Munde.Ex.Minister of Rural Development, Women and Child Welfare in Devendra Fadnavis government
  - Pritam Munde - Younger daughter of Gopinath Munde. BJP Ex Member of Parliament from Beed
  - Dhananjay Munde - Nephew of Gopinath Munde, former Cabinet Minister in the Government of Maharashtra. Member of NCP

== N ==
=== The Naik Family (of Vasantrao) ===
- Vasantrao Naik, 4th Chief Minister of Maharashtra, Former Member of Parliament. The longest served Chief Minister of State.
  - Avinash Naik, son of Vasantrao Naik, Former Minister of state.
  - Sudhakarrao Naik, Nephew of Vasantarao Naik, Former Chief Minister of Maharashtra, Former Member of Parliament. Founder member of Nationalist Congress Party
    - Nilay Naik, Nephew of Sudhakarrao Naik, Member of Legislative Council, Former President of Zilha Parishad Yavatmal.
    - Manohar Naik, brother of Sudhkarrao Naik, Ex Cabinet Minister of Maharashtra, Leader of Nationalist Congress Party
      - Indranil Naik, son of Manohar Naik, and Minister of state and Member of Maharashtra Legislative Assembly from Pusad Assembly constituency.

=== The Naik Family ===
- Ganesh Naik, Member of legislative assembly and Cabinet Minister of Forest Maharashtra
  - Sanjeev Naik, Ex. Member of Parliament Lok Sabha, Ex.Mayor of Navi Mumbai Municipal Corporation
  - Sandeep Naik, Ex.Member of Legislative Assembly

== P ==
=== The Pawar Family, Baramati ===
- Sharad Pawar - former Agriculture Minister of India, Member of Parliament Rajya Sabha, awarded Padma Vibhushan
  - Supriya Sule - daughter of Sharad Pawar, Member, Lok Sabha Baramati constituency
  - Ajit Pawar - Son of Anantrao Pawar and nephew of Sharad Pawar; Late Deputy Chief Minister of Maharashtra State
  - Sunetra Pawar - wife of Ajit Pawar, Member of Rajya Sabha, Deputy Chief Minister of Maharashtra
    - Parth Pawar - son of Ajit and Sunetra Pawar, grandnephew of Sharad Pawar. Current RAJYA SABHA MEMBER
    - Jay Pawar - Younger son of Ajit and Sunetra Pawar, grandnephew of Sharad Pawar.
- Dinkarrao Govindrao Pawar alias Appasaheb Pawar - Sharad Pawar's elder brother - awarded by Padma Shri.
  - Rajendra Dinkarrao Pawar - son of Dinkarrao, runs the business for the family
  - Sunanda Pawar - wife of Rajendra Dinkarrao Pawar and social activist
    - Rohit Pawar - son of Rajendra and Sunanda, grandnephew of Sharad Pawar, nephew of Supriya Sule and Ajit Pawar, Member of Maharashtra Legislative Assembly Karjat Jamkhed Constituency
- Pratap Pawar - younger brother of Sharad Pawar, runs Sakal Group of Newspapers, awarded Padma Shri.

=== The Patil Family, Nilanga ===
- Shivajirao Patil Nilangekar - Former Chief Minister of Maharashtra
  - Rupatai Patil Nilangekar - former M.P from Latur and daughter-in-law of former C.M Shivajirao Patil Nilangekar
    - Sambhaji Patil Nilangekar -Former Cabinet Minister of Maharashtra state, grandson of Shivajirao Patil Nilangekar.

=== The Vikhe Patil family, Nagar/Shirdi ===
- Balasaheb Vikhe Patil Ex. Member of Parliament Lok Sabha. Member of Congress party
  - Radhakrishna Vikhe Patil Cabinet Minister in Government of Maharashtra. Son of Balasaheb Vikhe Patil. Member of BJP
    - Sujay Vikhe Patil BJP Member of Parliament Lok Sabha, Son of Radhakrishna Vikhe Patil & Grandson of Balasaheb Vikhe Patil

=== The Patil Family, Kolhapur ===
- D. Y. Patil - Former Governor of Bihar, India
  - Satej Patil - Member of Maharashtra Legislative Council, State Minister & Guardian Minister of Kolhapur District, Maharashtra
    - Ruturaj Sanjay Patil, Grandson of D. Y. Patil and former minister & Member of Maharashtra Legislative Assembly from Kolhapur South Assembly constituency from 2019-2024.

=== The Patil Family, Tasgaon (Sangli) ===
- R. R. Patil - Ex.Deputy Chief Minister and Cabinet minister of Maharashtra State
  - Suman Patil - Member of Legislative Assembly, Wife of R. R. Patil.
    - Rohit Patil, son of R. R. Patil and currently Member of Maharashtra Legislative Assembly from Tasgaon-Kavathe Mahankal Assembly constituency.

=== The Patil Family, Sangli ===
- Rajarambapu Patil - Former Member of legislative assembly Maharashtra.In the 1960s and 70s, he was influential in establishing many cooperative instituitions such as a bank and a Sugar factory in sangli district.
  - Jayant Patil - Cabinet Minister of Maharashtra State, Son of Rajarambapu Patil

=== The Paranjape Family ===
- Paranjape Prakash Vishvanath - Shiv Sena MP from Thane Lok Sabha.
  - Anand Paranjpe - Son of Prakash Paranjape. Industrialist and member of the 15th Lok Sabha from Kalyan representing the NCP.

== R ==
=== The Rane Family ===
- Narayan Rane - Chief Minister of Maharashtra (1999) under the Shiv sena BJP coalition government and central minister from 2021
  - Nilesh Narayan Rane - Member of Parliament from Ratnagiri-Sindhudurg. Son of Narayan Rane. Member of ShivSena
  - Nitesh Narayan Rane - Member of Maharashtra Legislative Assembly form Kankavli. Son of Narayan Rane.Member of BJP

== S ==
=== The Satav Family, Hingoli ===
- Rajni Satav- Ex Minister of State Maharashtra, (Ex MLA, Ex MLC)
- Rajeev Satav (Ex MLA, Ex MP Loksabha, Ex MP Rajya Sabha, Former IYC President)
- Pradnya Rajeev Satav (MLC and Vice President Maharashtra Pradesh Congress Committee )

=== The Solanke Family, Beed ===
- Sundarrao Solanke - Patil, Former Deputy Chief Minister of Maharashtra State (1978-1980), Unopposed MLA in 1972, First President of Beed district|Beed Zilla Parishad.
  - Prakashdada Sundarrao Solanke, Former Minister of State for Revenue in Maharashtra Government (2009-2012).

=== The Shinde Family, Solapur ===
- Sushilkumar Shinde, Former Central Home Minister of India, Former Ministry of Power, Former Governor of AndhraPradesh, Former Chief Minister of Mahrashtra.
  - Praniti Shinde, Member of Legislative Assembly from Solapur City Central, Mahrashtra, AICC Media Panelist. Daughter of Sushilkumar

=== The Shirole (Patil) Family, Pune. ===
- Anil Shirole, Ex-Member of Parliament from Pune. BJP member
- Siddharth Shirole, Present Member of Legislative Assembly Maharashtra from Shivajinagar Assembly Constituency Pune. BJP member

=== The Shinde Family, Thane ===
- Eknath Shinde, 19th Chief minister of Maharashtra and currently Deputy Chief Minister, Member of Legislative Assembly from Kopri-Pachpakhadi, Maharashtra, Leader of Shiv Sena (2022-present) Party, former Cabinet Minister of PWD in Maharashtra State Government (2014-2019), Appointed as Guardian minister of Thane District (2014-2019)
- Shrikant Shinde, Member of Parliament 16th Lok Sabha from kalyan constituency, Maharashtra, Son of Eknath Shinde

=== The Siddique Family, Mumbai ===
- Baba Siddique, Former Minister of state for civil supplies, food, labour and FDA, former member of Maharashtra Legislative Assembly
  - Zeeshan Siddique, Son of Baba Siddique, Member of Maharashtra Legislative Assembly from Bandra west

== T ==
=== The Thackeray Family, Mumbai ===
- Bal Thackeray (also known as Balasaheb) (1926 – 2012) - founder leader and former chairperson of the Shiv Sena
  - Uddhav Thackeray, Former Chief Minister Of Maharashtra; leader and chairperson of the Shiv Sena (UBT); son of Balasaheb Thackeray
    - Aditya Thackeray, ex Minister (Environment and climate, Tourism, Protocol), Government of Maharashtra; founder and president of Yuva Sena; son of Uddhav Thackeray
- Shrikant Thackeray, younger brother of Bal Thackeray
  - Raj Thackeray, nephew of Balasaheb. Founded and heads the breakaway faction called Maharashtra Navnirman Sena

=== The Tanpure Family, Ahmednagar ===
- Dr Baburao Bapuji Tanpure popularly known as Baburao Dada consecutively served as member of the legislative assembly in the 1st Maharashtra Vidhan Sabha Assembly Elections (1962 to 1967) and the 2nd Maharashtra Vidhan Sabha Assembly Elections (1967 to 1972) from the Rahuri Assembly Constituency. He is the father of former five time member of legislative assembly and member of parliament and senior leader Prasad Tanpure and grandfather of Former Minister Prajakt Tanpure. Dr. Baburao Tanpure also played a highly instrumental role in the socio-economic development of the Rahuri region through the Indian Cooperative Movement. He founded the Dr. Baburao Bapuji Tanpure Sugar Factory in 1954, additionally the Sugar Mill included The Arts, Science, and Commerce College Rahuri, Vivekanand Nursing Home & Ayurved College, Shri Chattrapati Shivaji College of Engineering, 18 High Schools, 1 Public School, and a Primary School.
- Prasadrao Baburao Tanpure alias Bapusaheb, a close aide of Former Chief Minister of Maharashtra Sharad Pawar. Served 5 consecutive terms as the Maharashtra Legislative Assembly member from the Rahuri Vidhan Sabha Assembly Constituency from 1980 to 2004. He was also elected as a Member of Parliament in the 12th Lok Sabha Indian Elections from the Kopergaon Lok Sabha Assembly Constituency in 1998. Prasadrao Tanpure also served as the director of the Ahmednagar District Central Co-Operative Bank (ADCC Bank) for 20 years. Prasadrao Tanpure also founded the Prasad Sugar Factory in Vambori of Rahuri.
- Prajakt Tanpure is the son of Prasadrao Baburao Tanpure and former Minister of State for Urban Development, Energy (incl. New and Renewable Energy), Revenue, Medical Education, Higher and Technical Education, Disaster Management, Relief and Rehabilitation, Tribal Development, and Textiles in the Thackeray Ministry from 2019 to 2022. He also served as the Guardian Minister to Gondia District in the Thackeray Ministry. He was elected in the Maharashtra Legislative Assembly in the 14th Vidhan Sabha Assembly Elections from the Rahuri-Nagar-Pathardi legislative constituency from 2019 to 2024. Prajakt Tanpure is currently serving as an unopposed member of the Maharashtra Legislative Council from the Ahilyanagar District Local Authorities constituency, term ranging from 2026 to 2032. Prajakt Tanpure is also the President of The Maharashtra State Volleyball Association. He is also the nephew of former Home and Finance Cabinet Minister of Maharashtra Jayant Patil.
- Dr. Usha Prasad Tanpure is the spouse of Prasadrao Baburao Tanpure. She ran as a candidate for the Rahuri Vidhan Sabha Assembly Elections in 2014. She also served as the mayor of Rahuri for 10 years in the Rahuri Municipal Corporation. She is the daughter of prominent Indian Freedom Fighter and Former Maharashtra Minister Rajarambapu Patil.
- Arun Baburao Tanpure is the son of Dr. Baburao Bapuji Tanpure. He is a prominent leader in the Co-operative sector, heading The Rahuri Agricultural Produce Market Comitee as the Chairman and previously served as the official elected Director on the Ahmednagar District Central Co-Operative Bank (ADCC Bank), representing the Primary Agricultural Co-Operative society for Rahuri. He is also the former Mayor of the Rahuri Municipal Corporation. He is the current elected Chairman of the Dr. Baburao Bapuji Tanpure Sugar Factory.

=== The Tatkare Family, Raigad ===
- Dattaray Tatkare (1927–1984), Senior leader of the Indian National Congress from Kolad, Raigad. Father of Anil and Sunil Tatkare.
  - Anil Tatkare (born 1953), Member of the Maharashtra Legislative Council for Raigad-Ratnagiri-Sindhudurg Local Authorities from 2010 to 2018. Member of Raigad District Council from 1997 to 2002. Elder son of Dattaray Tatkare.
    - Avadhut Tatkare (born 1979), Member of the Maharashtra Legislative Assembly for Shrivardhan from 2014 to 2019. President of the Roha-Ashtami Municipal Council from 2009 to 2015. Son of Anil Tatkare.
  - Sunil Tatkare (born 1955), Member of Parliament for Raigad since 2019. Cabinet Minister in the Government of Maharashtra from 2004 to 2014. Member of the Maharashtra Legislative Assembly for Mangaon from 1995 till 2009 and for Shrivardhan from 2009 to 2014. President of the Raigad District Council from 1992 to 1995. Younger son of Dattaray Tatkare.
    - Aniket Tatkare (born 1982), Member of the Maharashtra Legislative Council for Raigad-Ratnagiri-Sindhudurg Local Authorities since 2018. Son of Sunil Tatkare.
    - Aditi Tatkare (born 1988), Cabinet Minister for Women and Child Development in the Government of Maharashtra since 2023 and Member of the Maharashtra Legislative Assembly for Shrivardhan since 2019. President of the Raigad District Council from 2017 to 2019. Daughter of Sunil Tatkare.

=== The Thorat Family, Ahmednagar ===
- Bhausaheb thorat, Bhausaheb Thorat was a peasant leader and worked as a freedom fighter in the freedom struggle in Maharashtra and a one-time legislator from Sangamner constituency.
  - Balasaheb Thorat, son of Bhausaheb thorat and he is a senior member of the Congress Party. He served as a MLA from Sangamner constituency from 1985 until November 2024. He served as the revenue minister in Maharashtra.He also served as the Deputy Leader of the Opposition in the Maharashtra Legislative Assembly.

=== The Tambe Family, Ahmednagar ===
- Dr. Durgatai Tambe, Daughter of Bhausaheb thorat & Sister of Balasaheb Thorat and Mayor of Sangamner Municipal Council.
  - Dr. Sudhir Tambe Patil, is son-in-law of Bhausaheb Thorat and he is former member of the Maharashtra Legislative Council from the Nashik Graduate constituency for 3 continuous terms.
    - Satyajeet Tambe Patil is Son of Dr. Sudhir Tambe Patil & He is also the nephew of Balasaheb Thorat and he is a member of the Maharashtra Legislative Council from the Nashik Graduate constituency. And he was the President of Maharashtra Pradesh Youth Congress.

== Z ==
=== The Zanak Family ===
- Subhash Zanak - Son of Ramrao. Former Cabinet Minister For Women and Child Welfare, Ashok Chavan's Ministry. Member of Congress party
- Amit Subhashrao Zanak - Son of Subhash and grandson of Ramrao. Legislator in Maharashtra assembly. Member of Congress party

=== The Zakaria Family ===
- Rafiq Zakaria Former Deputy Chairman, Rajya Sabha & Cabinet Minister in Maharashtra State.
- Salim Zakaria - Former Minister of Education & Aukaf, Government of Maharashtra & Chairman Haj Committee of India.
- Ahmed Zakaria - Younger step-brother of Rafiq Zakaria, two term Legislator in Maharashtra Assembly, Founder Chairman Haj Committee of India.
- Asif Zakaria - Son of Ahmed, Municipal Corporator, Ward No. 101 & Member - Standing Committee, Municipal Corporation of Greater Mumbai.
