= Karhati =

Village in Maharashtra

- Village
- Location in Maharashtra, India Karhati (India)
- Coordinates: 18.26°N 74.42°E
- Country: India
- State: Maharashtra
- District: Pune
- Elevation: 538 m (1,765 ft)

Population (2005)
  - Total: 5,500

Languages
  - Official: Marathi
- Time zone: UTC+5:30 (IST)
- PIN: 412204
- Telephone code: 02112

Karhati is a village in a Baramati block/tehsil of Pune district in the state of Maharashtra, India. The name of the village seems to be derived from Marathi expression Kaŗhechyā kāthī (on the banks of the Karha River).

Agriculture is the main occupation of the people in Karhati. The main food crops grown include bajari, jwari, onion and wheat. Onion and wheat are sent to markets at Pune and Baramati.

Karhati is a native place of well known Marathi poet Saleel Wagh.

== History ==
Karhati is a well-known place in Baramati. It is situated on the banks of the river Karha. The village has a historical significance because of Shri. Agarkar Baba, who started school in Karhati in 1952. The village is also famous in Maharashtra because of its many doctors, engineers, teachers and gramsevaks.

The village has a long history of about 200 years. The village has eleven beautiful temples which were built around 100 years ago. Amongst them are Shri Yashawantraya temple and Shri Andhari Aai, both on banks of the river.

== Geography ==
Karhati, in Maharashtra, has an average elevation of 538 metres (1765 feet). Karhati is having very odd weather; hot summer from March to May and very cold, dry weather from November to February. Karhati receives a scant rainfall mainly in June to August approx 60 cm. Weather in Karhati is dry and hot in summer, winter day temperature goes as low as 25 degree Celsius. Winter night temperature goes as low as 8 Degree Celsius. In summer, the day temperature often surpasses the 40. C mark. Normally, Karhati has very pleasant climate during November Month. Can be called as (Marathi: गुलाबी थंडी) or balanced cold waves.

== Economy ==
Karhati and surrounding areas mostly depend on agriculture as the main source of income. The land in the region is very well fertilized and water from river Karha provides Water supply to farms.

Main crops include wheat, onion, jawari, and bajari. Onion and Wheat are exported from here.

Karhati is famous in the Baramati and Daund Tehsil for the Well concrete construction contractors and workers. Every year more than 100 wells concrete construction will be carried out by the contractors in the village, having a contribution to the village economy.

== Transport ==
Karhati is well connected by road with major cities in State. Karhati is 100 km from Pune by road. It connects to major highways by road network.

Karhati has nearby airport in Baramati, an airport which is currently catering a Flying School. Baramati is considered to be one of the future domestic airports in the region. The condition of roads in village are bad.

From 2014 to 2015, youth of the village is taking active participation in the local politics, which causing the construction of good concrete roads in the Village through the funds available through Prime Minister of India in to the Account of Village Sarpanch. Now the connectivity of the roads is much better than the previous years.

== Education ==
Karhati has created a niche for itself in the field of education. Vasatigrih Vidyalaya (literally meaning Hostel Highschool) Karhati (VVK) is a school in the area which is started by Agarkar Baba and played important role in the development of village. Last decade has seen growth of Karhati as a Prominent Education Center with High-school and Schools.

Schools in Karhati

1. Jivan Shikshan Vidya Mandir Karhati (Primary School)
2. Vasatigrih Vidyalaya Karhati (VVK)-Higher Secondary School

Karhati and surrounding area has three major places which have become well known education centers in the state.

Vidya Pratishthan offers courses from Primary Education to master's degree. Vidyanagari has a Law College, College of Engineering, School of BioTechnology, Institute of Information Technology, MBA, MCA apart from Primary School and Arts, Commerce, Science College.

Tuljaram Chaturchand College has a junior college and a senior college with equipped staff following the latest trends in the market. The Senior college provides graduation in science, commerce and arts.

Sharadabai Pawar Campus offers dedicated college for girls. Courses here include Basic Graduation, Junior College and bachelor's degree in education.

Campus in Malegaon offers wide range of Technology and Management Courses. The campus has an Engineering College, a Management Institute and a Pharmacy College.
