= Gadakh =

Gadakh is a surname and middle name. People with the name include:

- Shankarrao Gadakh
- Tukaram Gangadhar Gadakh
- Yashwantrao Gadakh Patil

== See also ==
- The Gadakh family, an Indian political family
