= Malegaon Budruk =

Village in Maharashtra

- Town
- Location in Maharashtra, India Malegaon Budruk (India)
- Coordinates: 18.1322983°N 74.4633902°E
- Country: India
- State: Maharashtra
- District: Pune
- Tehsil: Baramati

Government
  - Type: Panchayati Raj
  - Body: Nagar panchayat

Area
  - Total: 1,854.47 ha (4,582.5 acres)

Population (2011)
  - Total: 21,284
  - Density: 1,147.7/km^{2} (2,972.6/sq mi)
- Sex ratio 132 /127 ♂/♀

Languages
  - Official: Marathi
  - Other spoken: Hindi
- Time zone: UTC+5:30 (IST)
- Pin code: 413115
- Telephone code: 02112
- ISO 3166 code: IN-MH
- Vehicle registration: MH-42
- Website: malegaonnp.org

Malegaon Budruk is a town and nagar panchayat in India, situated in Baramati taluka of Pune district in the state of Maharashtra. Formerly a Gram Panchayat, it was newly established as a Nagar Panchayat on 30th March 2021. This Nagar Panchayat is situated just 5 km from Baramati and approximately 80 km from Pune city. According to the 2011 Census, Malegaon Budruk has a population of 21,284. The town spans a geographical area of 1,854.47 hectares, comprising agricultural, residential, industrial, and educational zones.

== Administration ==
The town is administrated by a President, an elected representative who leads a nagar panchayat. At the time of the 2011 Census of India, the nagar panchayat was the headquarters for the eponymous gram panchayat, which also governed the villages of Malegaon Khurd and Pimpari.

== Demographics ==
According to the 2011 Census, Malegaon Budruk has a population of 21,284. The town spans a geographical area of 1,854.47 hectares, comprising agricultural, residential, industrial, and educational zones.

== Air travel connectivity ==
The closest airport to the village is Pune Airport.

== See also ==
- List of villages in Mawal taluka
