= Dorlewadi =

Village in Maharashtra

Dorlewadi is a village of Baramati taluka, Pune district, Maharashtra, India. The village is approximately 6.9 km from Baramati, 92.4 km from Pune, and 212 km from Mumbai.

Dorlewadi is also known for its famous festivals, such as "Tukaram Biz" and "Mahatma Phule Jayanti." Every April, after Dehu Gaon, thousands of people gather in the village to celebrate Tukaram Biz, the largest and most famous festival, featuring activities such as Bhajan and Kirtan.

The village held a Prabhu Shriram Murti Pranpratisthapana ceremony.
