= Sangavi =

Village in Maharashtra

- Village
- Country: India
- State: Maharashtra
- District: Pune
- Tehsil: Baramati
- Youth Organization: Narli Bag

Government
  - Type: Panchayati Raj
  - Body: Gram panchayat

Area
  - Total: 400.03 ha (988.5 acres)

Population (2011)
  - Total: 625
  - Density: 156/km^{2} (405/sq mi)
- Sex ratio 330 / 295 ♂/♀

Languages
  - Official: Marathi
  - Other spoken: Hindi
- Time zone: UTC+5:30 (IST)
- Pincode: 413102
- Website: pune.nic.in

Sangavi is a village in India, situated in the Baramati taluka on the river of nira of Pune district in the state of Maharashtra. It encompasses an area of 400.03 ha (988 acres).

== Administration ==
The village is administrated by a sarpanch, an elected representative who leads a gram panchayat. At the time of the 2011 Census of India, the gram panchayat governed three villages and was based at Sate.

== Demographics ==
At the 2011 census, the village comprised 112 households. The population of 625 was split between 330 males and 295 females.

== See also ==
- List of villages in Mawal taluka
