= Maharashtra State Agri and Rural Tourism Co-operative Federation Limited =

Federation of agriculturists and their co-operatives

Maharashtra State Agri and Rural Tourism Co-operative Federation Limited is a federation of agriculturalists and their co-operatives. Its scope of influence is Maharashtra an Indian state. It is also known by the acronym MART.

== Establishment ==
The federation was set up on 12 December 2008 at Baramati in Pune district of Maharashtra. According to its managing director the federation would help farmers to supplement their income from farm produce by initiating tourism related activities on their properties. MART in partnership with NABARD has undertaken training and certification programmes for farmers.

== International study tours ==
A news report informs that members of MART would be sponsored by the Maharashtra state government to go on international tours to study agriculture related tourism activities. MART is the apex body for co-operatives related to agriculture based tourism belonging to Maharashtra.

== Subsidies ==
MART lobbies the state government and India's central government so that they would extend subsidies to agri-tourism activities. MART has demanded that loans be extended at a rate of six percent by NABARD considering that it has certified agri tourism as an emerging business.
