= Loni Bhapkar =

Village in Maharashtra

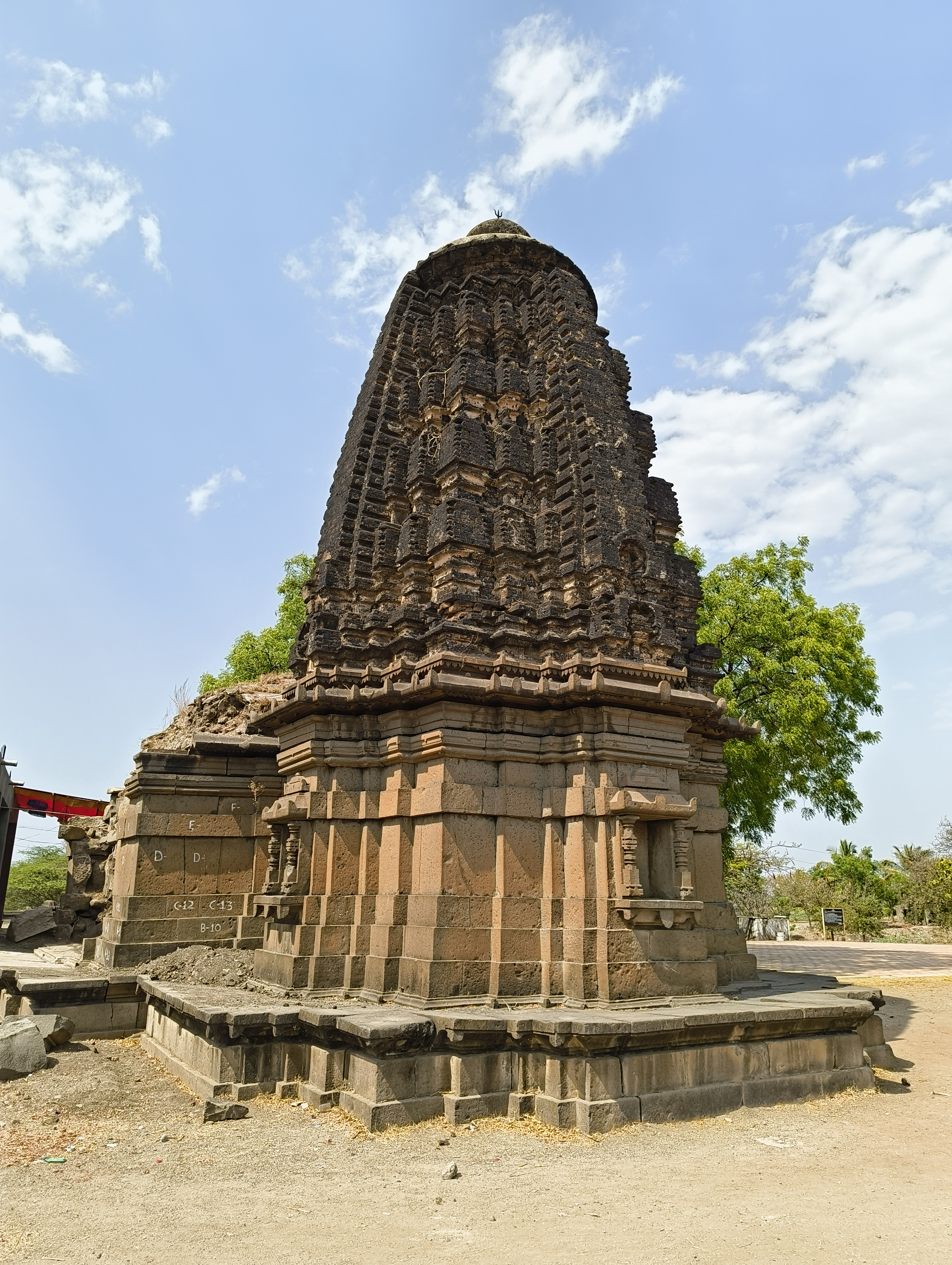
Temple in Loni Bhapkar

Loni Bhapkar is a village located in the Baramati Tehsil of Pune District, India. The Maratha Bhapkars clan built a fort at this place. The ancient temple of Shri Mallikarjun Mahadev temple attracts people to the village.
