= Rohit Pawar =

Indian politician

Rohit Rajendra Pawar
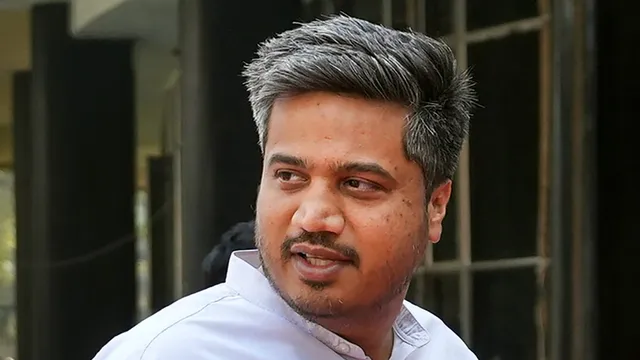

Member of Maharashtra Legislative Assembly
- Incumbent
- Assumed office 26 October 2019
- Preceded by: Ram Shinde
- Constituency: Karjat-Jamkhed

President Maharashtra Cricket Association
- Incumbent
- Assumed office 22 November 2022

Personal details
- Born: 29 September 1985 (age 40) Baramati, Maharashtra, India
- Party: Nationalist Congress Party – Sharadchandra Pawar (2024–present)
- Other political affiliations: Nationalist Congress Party (2017–2024)
- Spouse: Kunti Magar-Pawar
- Parent(s): Rajendra Pawar; Sunanda Rajendra Pawar
- Occupation: Businessman, Political & Social Activist

Rohit Rajendra Pawar is an Indian politician and member of Maharashtra Legislative Assembly from the Karjat-Jamkhed constituency in Maharashtra, India. He belongs to the politically influential Pawar family.

== Early life and family ==
Rohit Pawar was born to Rajendra Pawar and Sunanda Pawar in Baramati, Maharashtra on 29 September 1985. He is the grandson of Dinkarrao Govindrao Pawar and the grandnephew of prominent Indian politician and former union agriculture minister of India, Sharad Pawar. He completed his schooling from Vidya Prathisthan, Baramati. He graduated with a Bachelor of Management Studies from University of Mumbai in 2007. Rohit Pawar is married to Kunti Pawar. The couple has two children.

== Business career ==
He is the CEO of Baramati Agro. He served as the President of the Indian Sugar Mills Association (ISMA) from September 2018 to 2019.

== Political career ==
Rohit began his political career by contesting and winning the Pune Zilla Parishad elections from the Shirsuphal-Gunawadi constituency in Baramati taluka, Pune, in 2017. During the 2019 Indian General Elections, he actively campaigned for the Nationalist Congress Party (NCP), leveraging his family's political influence and his grassroots connections.

In October 2019, Pawar was elected to the Maharashtra Legislative Assembly from the Karjat-Jamkhed constituency, defeating the incumbent BJP candidate and cabinet minister Ram Shinde with a significant margin of 135,824 votes. This victory marked a significant political milestone, as the constituency had been a BJP stronghold for 25 years.

As an MLA, Pawar has focused on addressing the socio-economic issues of his constituency. He established the Karjat-Jamkhed Integrated Development Foundation (KJIDF) to tackle local development challenges and improve the quality of life for residents. Additionally, he founded the Srujan Foundation, which organizes various events and competitions to engage and empower the youth.

Pawar has been actively involved in campaigning for various elections, including the Vidhan Sabha, Zilla Parishad, and Panchayat elections, over the past few years. His efforts have helped raise the profile of the Karjat-Jamkhed constituency on the socio-political map of Maharashtra.

In addition to his legislative work, Pawar has been considered a potential contender for leadership roles within the NCP, given his close relationship with his granduncle, Sharad Pawar, and his growing influence within the party. He is from the fourth generation of the Pawar family to hold public office.

== Maharashtra Cricket Association ==
Pawar was elected unopposed as the president of the Maharashtra Cricket Association (MCA).

Rohit has been serving as the President of the Maharashtra Cricket Association (MCA) since 2022. The MCA is the governing body for cricket in the state of Maharashtra, India, and is affiliated with the Board of Control for Cricket in India (BCCI). Under Pawar's leadership, the MCA has focused on infrastructure development and talent identification. In 2023, the association launched its own franchise-based T20 league, the Maharashtra Premier League (MPL), featuring six teams. The league aims to promote cricket at the grassroots level in Maharashtra.

During Pawar's tenure, the MCA has also entered into partnerships to improve facilities and support young cricketers in the state. In November 2023, the association announced a five-year deal with the Punit Balan Group and Manikchand Oxyrich as its main partners, worth Rs. five crore per season. This partnership is expected to help the MCA provide better facilities, develop infrastructure, implement welfare schemes, and focus on grassroots development in remote areas of the state.

== Election results ==
=== 2024 ===
2024 Maharashtra Legislative Assembly election: Karjat Jamkhed
Party	Candidate	Votes	%	±%
NCP-SP	Rohit Rajendra Pawar	127,676	48.54	
BJP	Ram Shinde	126,433	48.06	
NOTA	None of the Above	601	0.23	
Majority		1,243	0.004	
Turnout		2,63,050	74.97	
NCP-SP hold		Swing		

=== 2019 ===
2019 Maharashtra Legislative Assembly election: Karjat Jamkhed
Party	Candidate	Votes	%	±%
NCP	Rohit Rajendra Pawar	135,824	56.98	
BJP	Ram Shinde	92,477	38.80	
Majority		43,347		
Turnout		2,38,360	74.29	
NCP gain from BJP		Swing		

== See also ==
- Sharad Pawar
- Supriya Sule
- Ajit Pawar
- Sunanda Pawar
