= Sunanda Pawar =

Indian women's rights activist

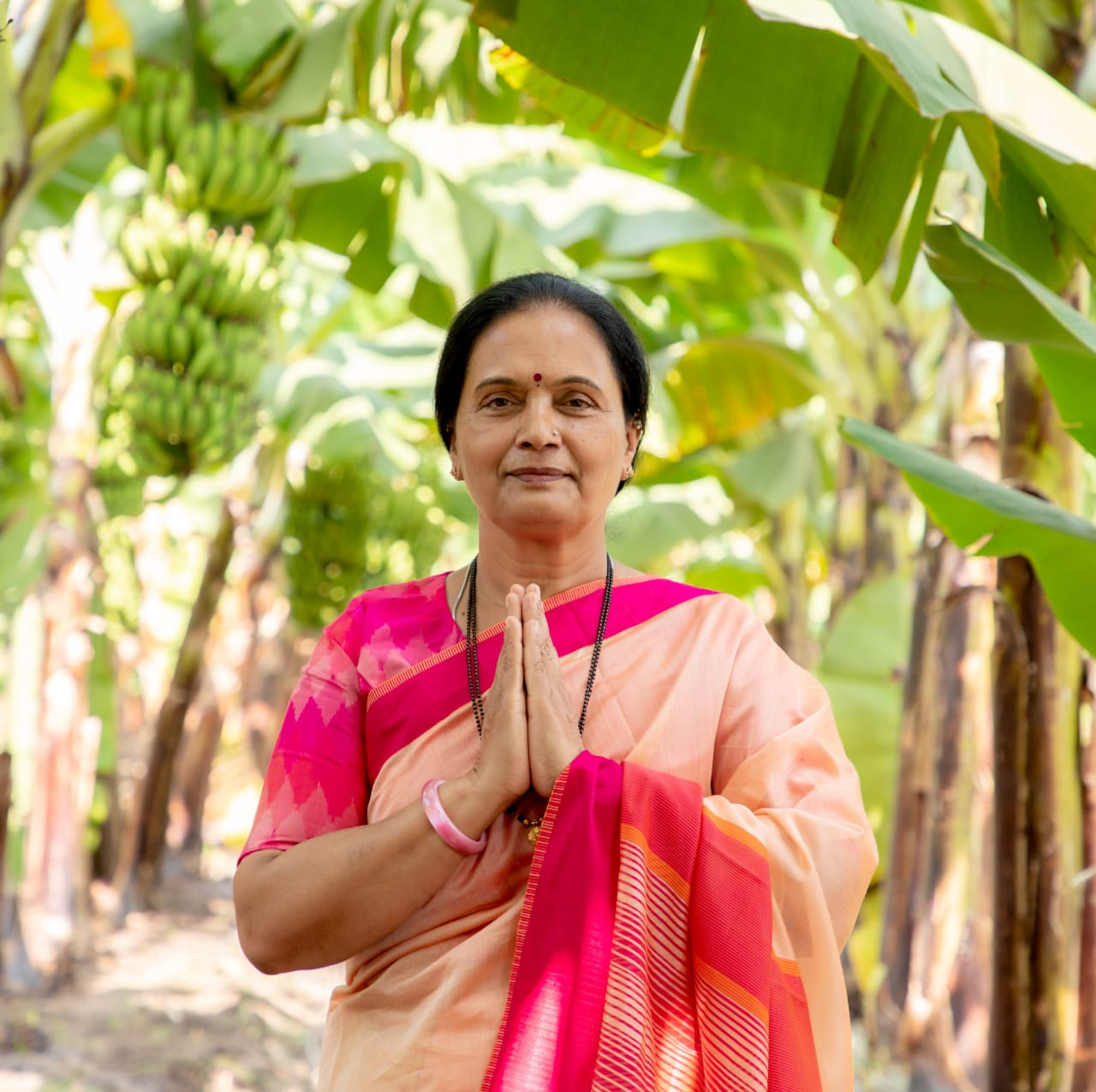
- Born: 31 May 1959 (age 66)
- Occupation: Farmer
- Organization(s): Agricultural Development Trust (ADT), Baramati, Pune (India)
- Known for: Social activism
- Notable work: Bhimthadi Jatra
- Title: Trustee of Agricultural Development Trust (ADT), Baramati
- Spouse: Rajendra Dinkarrao alias Appasaheb Pawar
- Children: 1. Rohit Rajendra Pawar, 2. Saee Pawar-Negi
- Website: https://bhimthadijatra.com, https://agridevelopmenttrustbaramati.org

Sunanda Rajendra Pawar, popularly known as Sunandatai, is an Indian women's rights activist and part of the Pawar political family. She is a trustee of the Agricultural Development Trust in Baramati, Pune. She is the mother of Rohit Pawar, a member of the Maharashtra Legislative Assembly from Karjat-Jamkhed.

== Early life and family ==
Pawar was born to Mohanrao Namdevrao Bhapkar and Savitribai Mohanrao Bhapkar in Baramati, Maharashtra on 31 May 1959. She completed her Primary education at Khatalpatta Z.P. School, her Secondary education at Mahatma Gandhi Balak Mandir, Baramati and her Junior education at Chhatrapati Vidyalaya Bhavaninagar, Indapur. She graduated in 'Economics Studies' from the University of Pune in 1980 and later married Rajendra Pawar. The couple has two children, one daughter and one son. She is the mother of Rohit Pawar, who is a member of the Maharashtra Legislative Assembly from Karjat-Jamkhed.

== Social Activities ==
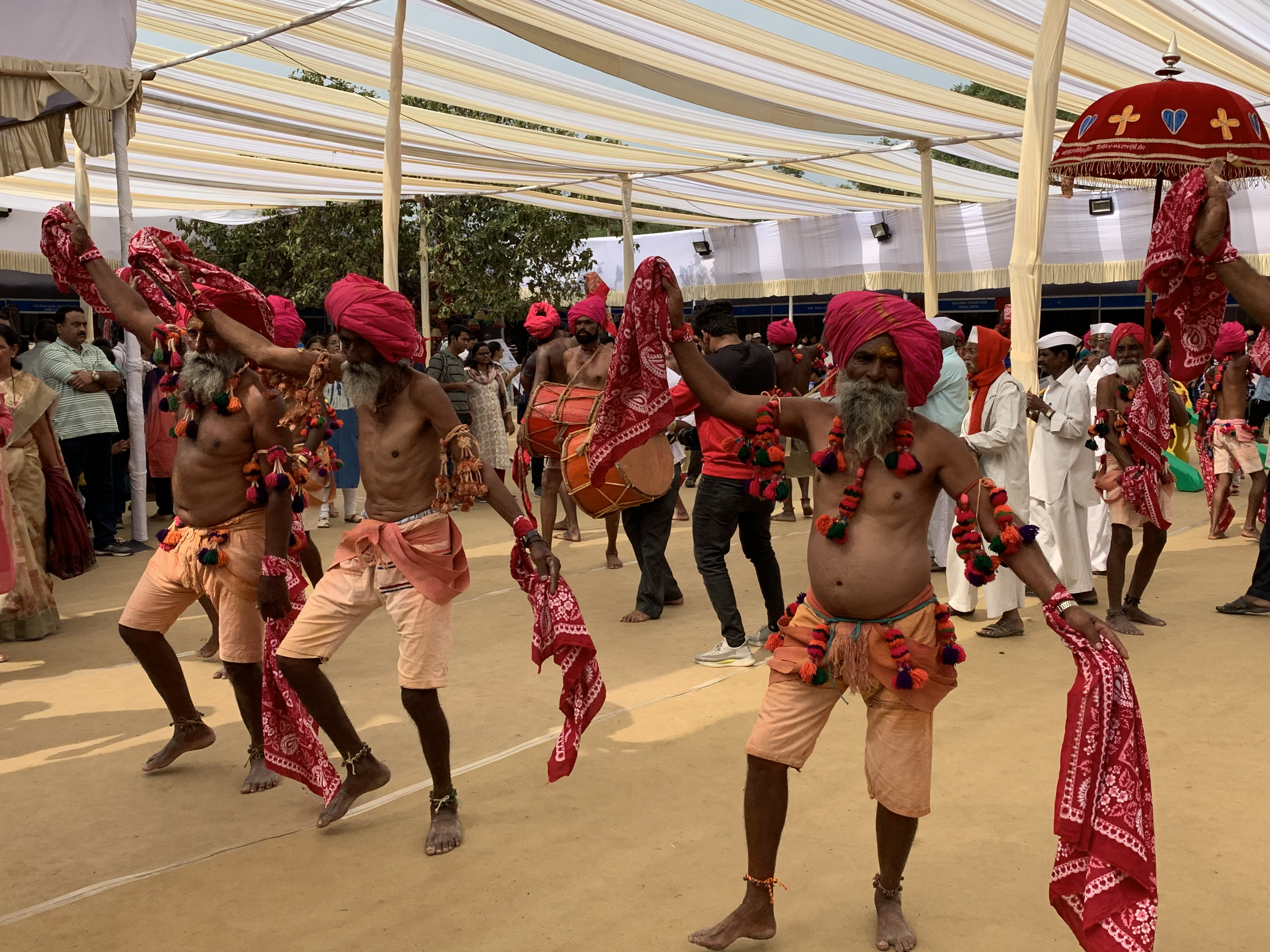
Folk dance by tribe at Bhimthadi Jatra

=== Bhimthadi Jatra ===
Pawar has organized an annual carnival called Bhimthadi Jatra since 2008. The week-long event showcases the art, culture, and foot of rural Maharashtra and was founded to promote women's empowerment.

=== Sobti ===
Pawar's "Sobti" program was founded by Pawar to spread menstrual awareness and increase rural women's access to menstrual products. Since its founding the program has reached over 55,000 college-aged women in rural India.

=== Water conservation ===
Pawar has chaired committees dedicated to water conservation work in rural Maharashtra. These committees and initiatives have improved groundwater levels and increased access to water in drought-stricken regions of Maharashtra.

=== Police training for women ===
Pawar leads an initiative to recruit women police officers and provide scholarships for their training. Since the founding of this initiative, over 600 women have become police officers in Maharashtra.
