= Sate (Mawal) =

Village in Maharashtra

Coordinates: 29°54′N 79°12′E

- Village
- Location in Maharashtra, India Sate (India)
- Country: India
- State: Maharashtra
- District: Pune
- Tehsil: Mawal

Government
  - Type: Panchayati Raj
  - Body: Gram panchayat

Area
  - Total: 1,075 ha (2,660 acres)

Population (2011)
  - Total: 1,772
  - Density: 164.8/km^{2} (426.9/sq mi)
- Sex ratio 897 / 875 ♂/♀

Languages
  - Official: Marathi
  - Other spoken: Hindi
- Time zone: UTC+5:30 (IST)
- Website: pune.nic.in

Sate is a village and gram panchayat in India, situated in the Mawal taluka of Pune district in the state of Maharashtra. It encompasses an area of 1,075 ha (2,656 acres).

== Administration ==
The village is administrated by a sarpanch, an elected representative who leads a gram panchayat. At the time of the 2011 Census of India, the village was the headquarters for the eponymous gram panchayat, which also governed the villages of Mohitewadi and Sangavi.

== Demographics ==
At the 2011 census, the village comprised 324 households. The population of 1772 was split between 897 males and 875 females.

== See also ==
- List of villages in Mawal taluka
