= Tuljaram Chaturchand College =

Coordinates: 18.523969°N 73.839219°E

Tuljaram Chaturchand College of Arts, Science and Commerce, Baramati
- तुळजाराम चतुरचंद महाविद्यालय
- Motto: सिद्धिरनेकांतात्
- Motto in English: Multidimensionalism
- Type: Minority Co-ed
- Established: 1962
- Parent institution: Anekant Education Society
- Affiliations: Pune University; National Cadet Corps; National Service Scheme; Yashwantrao Chavan Maharashtra Open University
- Religious affiliation: Jain
- Principal: Dr. Avinash S. Jagtap
- Vice Principals: Dr. Ashok Kalange; Dr. Sachin Gadekar; Dr. Yogini Muley
- Academic staff: 250
- Administrative staff: 50
- Students: 13000
- Location: Tuljaram Chaturchand College of Arts, Science & Commerce Baramati, Maharashtra, India - 413102, Baramati, Maharashtra, India
- NAAC Accreditation: A+
- Website: www.tccollege.org

Tuljaram Chaturchand College of Arts, Science and Commerce (T C College) is a college located in Baramati, Pune. The college was established in the 1962. The college campus is 40 acres large. The college offers Bachelors and master's degree in Arts, Commerce and Science. The college also offers bachelor's degree in vocational courses like Food Processing and Journalism & Mass Communication.

== History ==
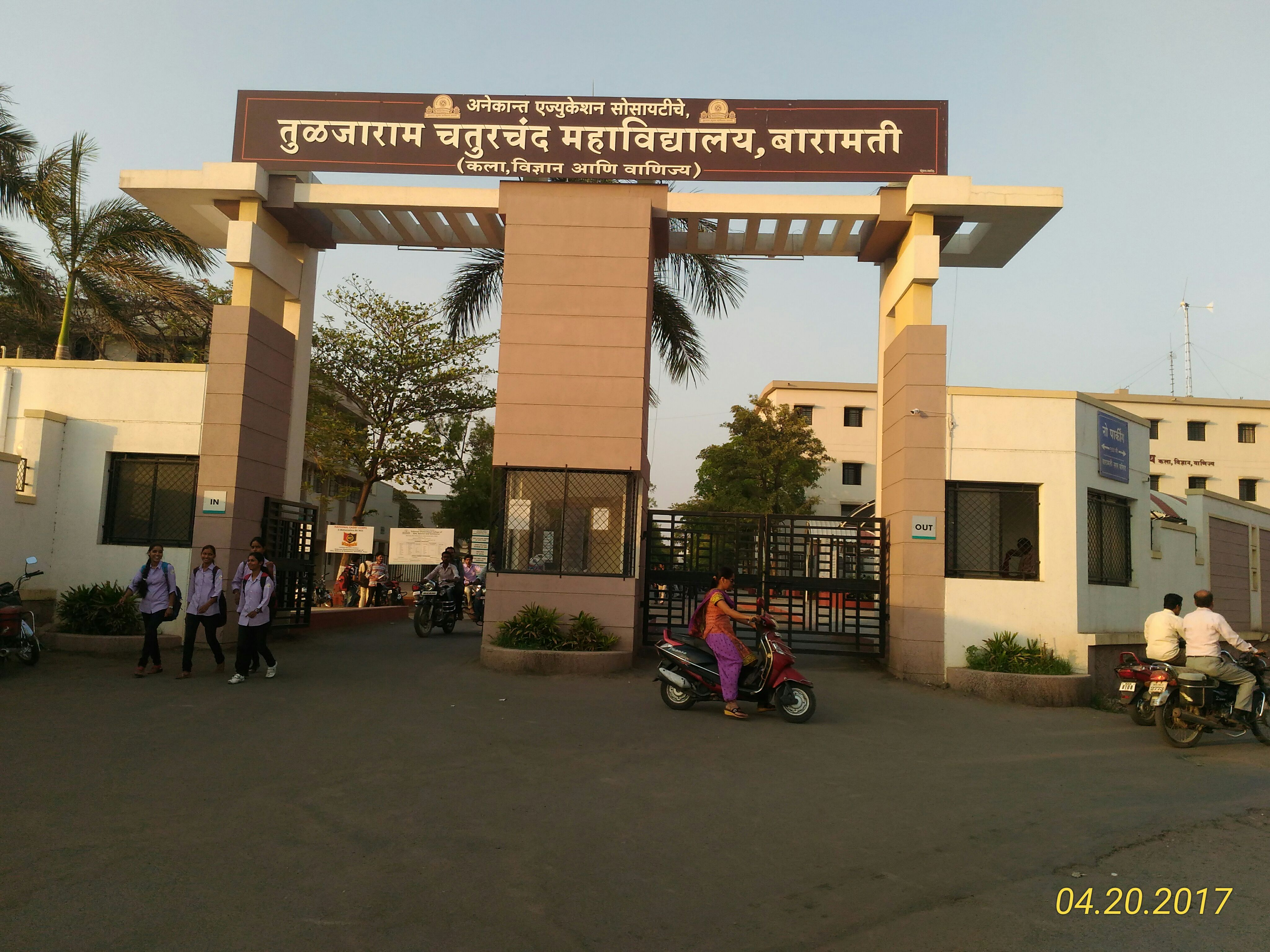

The college building got inaugurated on 23 June 1962 by Yashwantrao Chavan. Its name was ‘Baramati College’ and started with 120 students and 12 faculty members. On 21 June 1969, the college was renamed ‘Tuljaram Chaturchand College’. Lt. S. T. Vanakudre was first principal of the college.

== Activities ==
A journal named 'Anekant' which deals with Humanities and Social Sciences is run by the college.
