= Malegaon Khurd =

Village in Maharashtra

- Village
- Location in Maharashtra, India Malegaon Khurd (India)
- Coordinates: 18.9145597°N 73.475042°E
- Country: India
- State: Maharashtra
- District: Pune
- Tehsil: Mawal

Government
  - Type: Panchayati Raj
  - Body: Gram panchayat

Area
  - Total: 602 ha (1,490 acres)

Population (2011)
  - Total: 1,017
  - Density: 169/km^{2} (438/sq mi)
- Sex ratio 542 /475 ♂/♀

Languages
  - Official: Marathi
  - Other spoken: Hindi
- Time zone: UTC+5:30 (IST)
- Pin code: 410405
- Telephone code: 02114
- ISO 3166 code: IN-MH
- Vehicle registration: MH-14
- Website: pune.nic.in

Malegaon Khurd is a village in India, situated in Mawal taluka of Pune district in the state of Maharashtra. It encompasses an area of 602 ha (1,490 acres).

== Administration ==
The village is administrated by a sarpanch, an elected representative who leads a gram panchayat. At the time of the 2011 Census of India, the gram panchayat governed three villages and was based at Malegaon Budruk.

== Demographics ==
At the 2011 census, the village comprised 129 households. The population of 1017 was split between 542 males and 475 females.

== Air travel connectivity ==
The closest airport to the village is Pune Airport.

== See also ==
- List of villages in Mawal taluka
