= Pimpari =

Village in Maharashtra

- Village
- Location in Maharashtra, India Pimpari (India)
- Coordinates: 18.6324307°N 73.7757029°E
- Country: India
- State: Maharashtra
- District: Pune
- Tehsil: Mawal

Government
  - Type: Panchayati Raj
  - Body: Gram panchayat

Area
  - Total: 1,867 ha (4,610 acres)

Population
  - Total: 716
  - Density: 38.4/km^{2} (99.3/sq mi)
- Sex ratio 366/350 ♂/♀

Languages
  - Official: Marathi
  - Other spoken: Hindi
- Time zone: UTC+5:30 (IST)
- Pin code: 410405
- Telephone code: 02114
- ISO 3166 code: IN-MH
- Vehicle registration: MH-14
- Website: pune.nic.in

Pimpari is a village in India, situated in Mawal taluka of Pune district in the state of Maharashtra. It encompasses an area of 1,867 ha (4,610 acres).

== Administration ==
The village is administrated by a sarpanch, an elected representative who leads a gram panchayat. At the time of the 2011 Census of India, the gram panchayat governed three villages and was based at Malegaon Budruk.

== Demographics ==
At the 2011 census, the village comprised 163 households. The population of 716 was split between 366 males and 350 females.

== Air travel connectivity ==
The closest airport to the village is Pune Airport.

== See also ==
- List of villages in Mawal taluka
