= Irfan ur Rahman Khan =

Indian politician (born 1960)

Secretary Maharashtra Pradesh Congress Committee
- In office 2011–2016

Vice President Maharashtra Youth Congress
- In office 1989–2004

Member Maharashtra State Haj Committee
- In office 1999–2002

Member Maharashtra State Board of Waqfs
- In office 1990–1995

Member erstwhile Parbhani Municipal Council
- In office 1986–1991

Personal details
- Born: Irfan ur Rahman Khan; 9 February 1960 (age 66) Parbhani, Maharashtra, India
- Party: Indian National Congress
- Parent: Abdul Rahman Khan (father)
- Education: MSc, BEd, LLB
- Alma mater: Marathwada University, Aurangabad
- Occupation: Activist; Politician; Businessman

Irfan ur Rahman Khan also known as Irfan Khan is an Indian politician of Indian National Congress from Parbhani, Maharashtra, he was Secretary of Maharashtra Pradesh Congress Committee, and served as Vice President of Maharashtra Pradesh Youth Congress Committee from 1989 to 2004.

== Early life and education ==
Irfan ur Rahman Khan born in a Khan family on 9 February 1960 to Abdul Rahman Khan and Rasheeda Rahman in Parbhani, Maharashtra, India. His father was a senior Indian National Congress leader and a MLA and MLC from Parbhani. His mother was a principal in a Government Urdu School. He is third amongst six children of his parents having three sisters and two brothers, he obtained his BSc, MSc, BEd and LLB degrees from Marathwada University of Aurangabad.

== Personal life ==
Khan married his cousin in 1986 who is a school principal. They have four children, three sons and one daughter.

== Political career ==
Khan started his political career as a Youth Congress member in 1978 and become secretary of Parbhani district Youth Congress in 1983. He served as a member of Parbhani Municipal Council from 1986 to 1991. Later, he became Vice President of Maharashtra Pradesh Youth Congress Committee and Secretary of Maharashtra Pradesh Congress Committee from 1989 to 2004 and 2011–2016 respectively. he contested Maharashtra Assembly elections as INC candidate from Parbhani in 2014. He along with his family runs various NGOs like Abdul Rehman Khan Charitable Trust, Inayat Education Society, Yusoufiya Educational, Cultural and Welfare Society & Inayat Ul Uloom working in education, public health and social sectors.

== Positions held ==
- Secretary – Parbhani District Youth Congress in 1983.
- Member – erstwhile Parbhani Municipal Council, 1986–1991.
- Chairman – District Minority Cell, 1987–1998.
- Chairman – Sanjay Gandhi Niradhar Yojana Parbhani, 1988–1994.
- Vice President – Maharashtra Pradesh Youth Congress Committee, 1989–2004.
- Member – Maharashtra State Haj Committee, 1999–2002.
- Vice President – Parbhani District Congress Committee, 2006–2010.
- Member – District Minority Welfare Committee Parbhani, 2006–2010.
- Secretary – Maharashtra Pradesh Congress Committee, 2011–2016.
- Member – Central Hindi Advisory Committee (Union Ministry of Tourism & Aviation).
- Member – Marathwada Wakf Board (twice).
