= Bajari =

Bajari بجاري
- Village
- Country: Iran
- Province: Hormozgan
- County: Rudan
- Bakhsh: Rudkhaneh
- Rural District: Rudkhaneh Bar

Population (2006)
  - Total: 64
- Time zone: UTC+3:30 (IRST)
  - Summer (DST): UTC+4:30 (IRDT)

Bajari (Persian: بجاري, also Romanized as Bajārī) is a village in Rudkhaneh Bar Rural District, Rudkhaneh District, Rudan County, Hormozgan province, Iran. At the 2006 census, its population was 64, in 16 families.
