= Abdul Rahman Khan Yousuf Khan =

Indian politician (1925–2007)

Abdul Rahman Khan
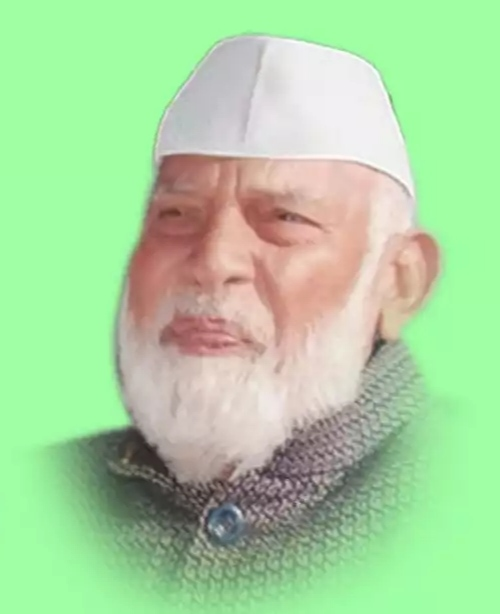

Member of Maharashtra Legislative Assembly
- In office 1980–1985
- Preceded by: Raosaheb Jamkar (INC)
- Succeeded by: Vijay Gavhane (PWP)
- Constituency: Parbhani

Member of Maharashtra Legislative Council
- In office 1990–1996

Member of Bombay Legislative Council
- In office 1958–1964

Personal details
- Born: Abdul Rahman Khan; 22 September 1925 Parbhani, British India (present-day Maharashtra, India)
- Died: 26 July 2007 (aged 81) Parbhani, Maharashtra, India
- Resting place: Qadarabad cemetery Parbhani, Maharashtra
- Party: Indian National Congress and Congress (I)
- Education: BA, LLB
- Alma mater: Osmania University, Hyderabad
- Occupation: Activist; Lawyer; Politician
- Known for: Confidant of Indira Gandhi

Abdul Rahman Khan Yousuf Khan also known as Abdul Rehman Khan and A R Khan was an Indian politician of Indian National Congress from Parbhani, Maharashtra, he was elected as a member of Maharashtra Legislative Assembly in 1980, he also served two terms as a member of Bombay Legislative Council and Maharashtra Legislative Council from 1958 to 1964 and 1990 to 1996 respectively.

== Early life and family ==
Abdul Rahman Khan was born in a Khan family on 22 September 1926 to Yousuf Khan and Inayat Begum in Parbhani town of Hyderabad state of British India (now in Parbhani, Maharashtra, India), he was eldest amongst five children of his parents, having three sisters and two brother, he obtained his Bachelor of Arts and LLB degrees from Osmania University of Hyderabad, In 1955 he married Rasheeda begum from Hyderabad who was a school teacher by profession, they have 3 sons and 3 daughters. his eldest son Irfan ur Rahman Khan is continuing his political legacy and is former Secretary of Maharashtra Pradesh Congress Committee from Parbhani. who contested vidhan sabha elections from Parbhani in 2014 on Indian National Congress's ticket.

== Political profile ==
He was known for his clean image and as an Indira Gandhi confidant in the political spectrum, he started his political career as a member of Parbhani municipal council and later became President of Parbhani municipal council and Marathwada Wakf Board. He defeated Vijay Gavhane of PWP by 8738 votes in Maharashtra state assembly elections in 1980 as an Indian National Congress candidate from Parbhani (Vidhan Sabha constituency) he also served two times as a member of Maharashtra Legislative Council, the upper house of Maharashtra legislative assembly.

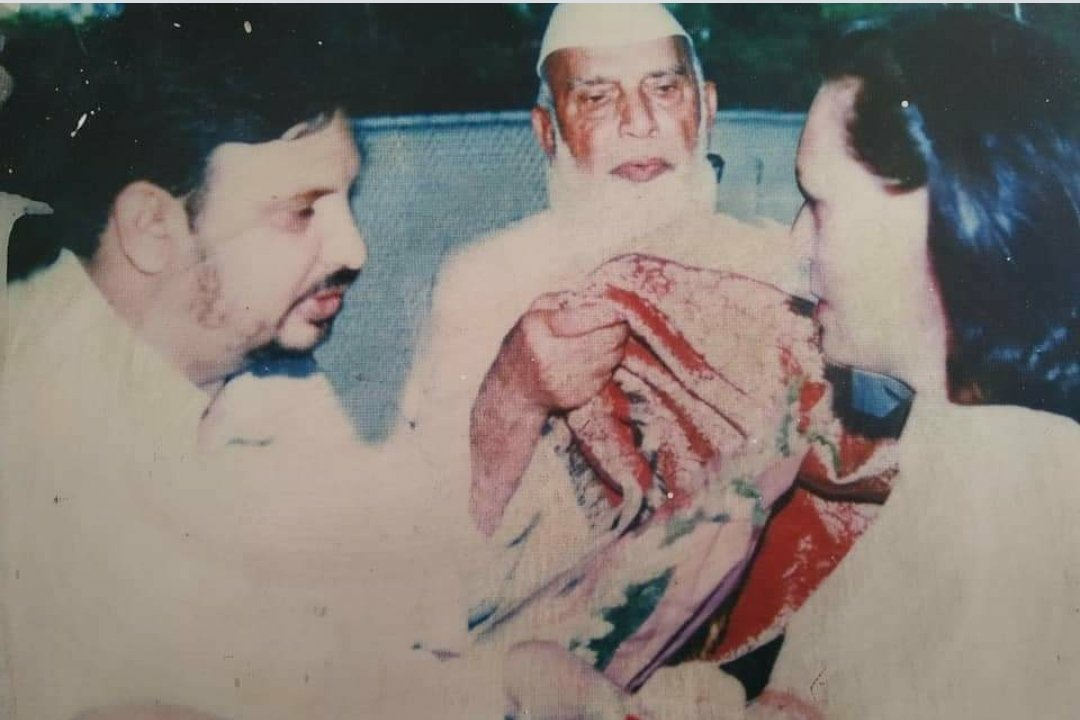
Abdul Rahman Khan and son Irfan Ur Rahman Khan welcoming Sonia Gandhi at Parbhani 2004

== Positions held ==
- Secretary, District Congress Committee, Parbhani 1954–1958
- Member, erstwhile Parbhani Municipal Council (3 times) 1957–1974
- Senate member, Dr. Babasaheb Ambedkar Marathwada University Aurangabad 1958–1964
- Secretary, Pradesh Congress Committee 1958–1960
- Representative, Maharashtra Pradesh Congress Committee 1958–1964
- Member of Bombay Legislative Council (MLC) 1958–1964
- Founding President, Parbhani Education Society 1961–1974
- Working Secretary, Shri Shivaji College, Parbhani 1962–1974
- President, erstwhile Parbhani Municipal Council 1969–1974
- Member of Maharashtra Legislative Assembly (MLA), Parbhani 1980–1985
- Senate Member, erstwhile Marathwada Agricultural University, Parbhani 1982–1984
- President, District Congress Committee, Parbhani 1984–1986
- Member of Maharashtra Legislative Council (MLC) 1990–1996
- Member, Maharashtra Haj Committee 1991–1993
- President, Marathwada Wakf Board 10 years
- President, Indira Gandhi Education Society, Parbhani 10 years
- Founding Member, Marathwada Shikshan Prasarak Mandal

== Death and legacy ==
Abdul Rahman Khan died due to cancer on 26 July 2007 in a government hospital of Parbhani at the age of 81 years. His burial was carried out in Parbhani with full state honours on 27 July and his Kabr (resting place) is situated in Qadarabad cemetery of Parbhani.

=== Places Named After Abdul Rahman Khan Yousuf Khan ===
- A Hospital run by Parbhani Municipal Corporation at Inayat nagar was named as Abdul Rahman Khan Public Health Center
- A chowk in Parbhani is named after him as Abdul Rahman Khan Chowk
- A memorial organization named Abdul Rehman Khan Charitable Trust started by his kin under supervision of his son Irfan ur Rahman Khan runs free/subsidized clinic and ambulance services and is involved in other social welfare activities.
