= Raigad District Council =

Indian local government

Zilla Parishad Raigad

Type
- Type: Lower house (Zilla Parishad Raigad)
- Term limits: 5 years

History
- Founded: 1962

Leadership
- President: Yogita Pardhi, PWPI
- Vice-President: Sudhakar Parashuram Ghare, NCP
- Leader of the house: Yogita Pardhi
- Leader of the Opposition: 1) Surendra Mhatre 2) Mansi Dalvi
- Chief Executive Officer: Dr. Bharat Bastewad (IAS)
- Seats: 59 BJP: NCP: Shivsena: INC: Independent: Registered Alliance:

Elections
- Voting system: First past the post
- Last election: 2017
- Next election: 2022

Meeting place
- Zilla Parishad Building, Raigad.

Website
- www.zpraigad.gov.in

Zilla Parishad Raigad or District Council Raigad is a district council having jurisdiction over Raigad district in Maharashtra, India.

== List of Council Chairman of Raigad ==
SI No.	Name	Constituency	Department	Party
1.	Yogita Jagan Pardhi; President	Panvel Taluka	Chairman, Of the Committee: Law and Judiciary; Other departments not allocated to any Chairman.	Peasants and Workers Party of India
2.	Sudhakar Parashuram Ghare; Vice-President	Karjat Taluka	Chairman, Of the Committee: Education, Sport; Health,	Nationalist Congress Party
3.	Nilima Dhairyashil Patil	-	Chairman, Of the Committee: Finance; Public Work Department	Peasants and Workers Party of India
4.	Geeta Uttam Jadhav	-	Chairman, Of the Committee: Women and Child Welfare	Nationalist Congress Party
5.	Dilip Vitthal Bhoir	-	Chairman, Of the Committee: Social Welfare	Indian National Congress
6.	Baban Shripat Manve	-	Chairman, Of the Committee: Agriculture, Animal Husbandry and; Dairy Committee	Indian National Congress
7.	Dr. Bharat Bastewad (IAS); Chief Executive Officer	-	All the departments.	Independent
8.	Mr. Kishan Narayanrao Jawale (IAS); District Magistrate	-	All the departments.	Independent

== Panchayat Samiti ==
Currently there are seven Panchayat Samiti under jurisdiction Zilla Parishad Raigad .

=== List ===
1. Panchayat Samiti Alibag
2. Panchayat Samiti Panvel
3. Panchayat Samiti Murud
4. Panchayat Samiti pen
5. Panchayat Samiti Uran
6. Panchayat Samiti Karjat
7. Panchayat Samiti Khalapur
8. Panchayat Samiti Mangaon
9. Panchayat Samiti Roha
10. Panchayat Samiti Sudhagad
11. Panchayat Samiti Tala
12. Panchayat Samiti Mahad
13. Panchayat Samiti Mhasala
14. Panchayat Samiti Shrivardhan
15. Panchayat Samiti Poladpur

== Head Officer ZP ==
Officers Name	Post	Department Name
Dr. Bharat Bastewad (IAS)	Chief Executive Officer	Raigad Zilla Parishad Alibag
Dr. Satyjeet Badre	Additional Chief Executive Officer	Raigad Zilla Parishad Alibag
Ms. Priydarshanee More	Project Director	District Rural Development Agency Raigad Zilla Parishad Alibag
Mr. Rajendra Bhalerao	Deputy Chief Executive Officer(GAD)	General Addministrtive Division Raigad Zilla Parishad Alibag
Mr. Mahadev Tele (Additional Charge)	Chief Account Finance Officer	Finance Division Raigad Zilla Parishad Alibag
Mr. Rajendra Bhalerao	Deputy Chief Executive Officer (VP)	Village Panchayat Division Raigad Zilla Parishad Alibag
Ms. Shubhangi Nakhale	Deputy Chief Executive Officer (WS)	Water & Sanitation Division Raigad Zilla Parishad Alibag
Ms. Punita Gurav	Education Officer (Primary)	Primary Education Division Raigad Zilla Parishad Alibag
Na	Deputy Education Officer (Primary)	Primary Education Division Raigad Zilla Parishad Alibag
Ms. Jostna Pawar Shinde	Education Officer (Secondary)	Secondary Education Division Raigad Zilla Parishad Alibag
Dr. Manisha Vikhe	District Health Officer	Health Division Alibag
Dr. Shamrao Kadam	District Social Walefare Officer	Social Walefare Raigad Zilla Parishad Alibag
Ms. Nirmala Kuchik	Womans & Chield Development Officer	Womans & Chield Development Division Raigad Zilla Parishad Alibag
Mr. Milind Chaudhari	Agriculture Development Officer	Agriculture Division Raigad Zilla Parishad Alibag
Dr. Shamrao Kadam	District Animal Husbandry Officer	Animal Husbandry Division Raigad Zilla Parishad Alibag
Mr. Prasannajet Raut	Executive Engineer (WD)	Works Division Raigad Zilla Parishad Alibag
Mr. S. P. Vegurlekar	Executive Engineer (RWS)	Rural Water Supply Division Raigad Zilla Parishad Alibag
Mr. Mahadev Tele	Deputy Chief Account Finance Officer	Finance Division Raigad Zilla Parishad Alibag
NA	Account Officer	Finance Division Raigad Zilla Parishad Alibag
NA	Administrative Officer	Health Division Raigad Zilla Parishad Alibag
NA	District Project Manager	National Health Mission Raigad Zilla Parishad Alibag
