= Sudhir Tambe =

Indian politician

Sudhir Tambe Patil
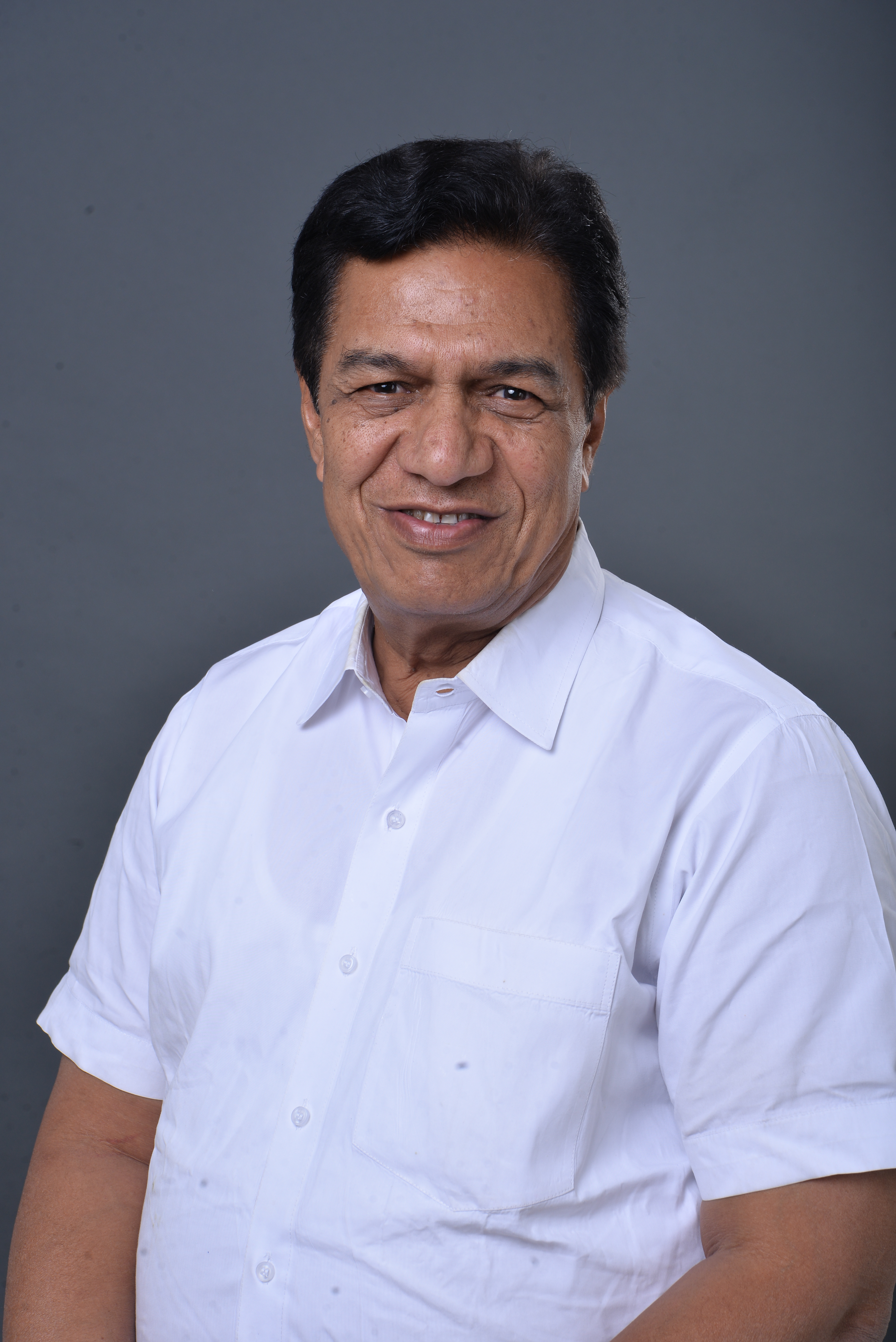

Member of Maharashtra Legislative Council
- In office (2009-2010), (2010-2016), (2017 – 2023)
- Preceded by: Pratap Narayanrao Sonawane
- Constituency: Nashik Graduates

Personal details
- Born: 17 January 1954 (age 72) Sangamner, Maharashtra, India
- Party: Indian National Congress
- Spouse: DurgaTai Tambe
- Children: Satyajeet Tambe, Dr.Harshal Tambe

Sudhir Bhaskarrao Tambe Patil is an Indian politician and a former member of the Maharashtra Legislative Council from the Nashik Graduate constituency in Maharashtra, India. He is the Chief trustee of Amrutvahini rural charitable hospital, Sangamner. He contested and won the Maharashtra Legislative Council elections from Nashik Graduate constituency in 2009, 2010 and 2017. His son Satyajeet Tambe won from same constituency in 2023 elections.

== Education ==
Sudhir Bhaskarrao Tambe is General Surgeon and Completed his Master of Surgeon from B. J. Medical College Pune.

== Career ==
Sudhir Tambe had represented Nashik Graduate constituency for 3 terms. He won in 2009, 2011 and 2017.
