= Satyajeet Tambe Patil =

Indian politician

Member of Maharashtra Legislative Council
- Incumbent
- Assumed office 2023
- Preceded by: Sudhir Tambe
- Constituency: Nashik Graduates

President of Maharashtra Pradesh Youth Congress
- In office (2018–2022)
- Succeeded by: Kunal Nitin Raut

Member of Ahmednagar District Council
- In office (2007–2017)

Vice-president of Maharashtra Pradesh Youth Congress
- In office (2011–2018)

Personal details
- Born: 27 September 1983 (age 42) At.Sangamner Ahmednagar District, Maharashtra
- Party: Independent
- Other political affiliations: Indian National Congress (2002-2023)
- Spouse: Maithili Tambe
- Parent(s): Sudhir Tambe (father); DurgaTai Tambe (mother)

Satyajeet Sudhir Tambe is a member of the Maharashtra Legislative Council from the Nashik Graduate constituency in Maharashtra, India. He contested and won the Maharashtra Legislative Council elections from Nashik Graduate constituency in 2023. He was associated with the Indian National Congress before contesting the 2023 Maharashtra Legislative Council Election as an independent candidate. Maharashtra Congress suspended Satyajit Tambe after he filed his independent candidature form from Nashik Graduate Constituency.

== Early life and education ==
Satyajeet Tambe was born in Sangamner to Sudhir Tambe and Durgatai Tambe, Mayor of Sangamner Municipal Council. His grandfather Bhausaheb Thorat was a freedom fighter and was involved in the co-operative movement in Maharashtra. He is the nephew of former minister in the Maharashtra government and senior Congress leader Balasaheb Thorat.

== Political Career ==
Satyajeet Tambe was elected as Maharashtra Pradesh Youth Congress President in 2018.

Vice President, Maharashtra State Youth Congress : September 2011 – August 2018

He served as the General Secretary of Maharashtra Unit of National Students Union of India, and later as the Vice President of Maharashtra State Youth Congress. He was elected as the President of the Maharashtra State Youth Congress in 2018 continued till end of his tenure in March 2022.

Member, Zilla Parishad, Ahmednagar. February 2007 – February 2017

He was elected to the Ahmednagar Zilla Parishad in 2007 and 2012 as a candidate of Indian National Congress.

General Secretary: Maharashtra Pradesh Youth Congress (2007 - 2011)

General Secretary: Maharashtra State NSUI (2002-2007)
