= Maharashtra Pradesh Youth Congress =

Maharashtra Pradesh Youth Congress (MPYC)
- President: Shivraj More
- Vice President: Prashant Ogale , Prathamesh Aabnave , Kapil Dhoke, Anurag Bhoyar, Aamer Abdul Salim, Diptesh Parab, Afreen Hussain
- Chairperson: Rahul Gandhi
- General Secretary: Pravin Biradar, Vivek Gawande
- Treasurer: Akshay Jain , Aniket Navale
- Founded: 9 August 1960 (66 years ago)
- Headquarters: 1. Tilak Bhavan, Kakasaheb Gadgil Marg, Dadar, Mumbai-400025, Maharashtra.; 2. Gandhi Bhavan, Colaba, Mumbai-400005, Maharashtra.
- Mother party: Indian Youth Congress
- Website: mpyc.in

Maharashtra Pradesh Youth Congress (MPYC) is the Maharashtra state unit of Indian Youth Congress, youth wing of Indian National Congress. The Congress Party’s youth wing is driven by the mission to fight for social causes and advance youth development initiatives. Effective 1st August 2025, Shivraj More is appointed as the president of Maharashtra State.

== Committee ==
=== President ===
- Shivraj More

=== Treasurer ===
- Akshay Jain
- Aniket Navale

=== Vice Presidents ===
- Prashant Ogale
- Aamer Abdul Salim
- Syed Afreen Hussain
- Kapil Dhoke
- Anurag Bhoyar
- Prathamesh Aabnave
- Deeptesh Parag

=== General Secretaries ===
- Pravin Biradar - General Secretary Organisation
- Vivek Gawande - General Secretary Administration

== Former Presidents ==
- Ulhas Pawar
- Satish Chaturvedi
- Suresh Kalmadi
- Vilas Muttemwar
- Gurudas Kamat
- Mohan Joshi
- Anees Ahmed 1997-1999
- Syed Muzaffar Hussain 1999-2004
- Sharad Aher 2004-2008
- Rajiv Satav 2008-2010
- Vishwajeet Kadam 2011-2018
- Satyajeet Tambe 2018-2022
- Kunal Raut 2022-2025

Name	Political Position
Ulhas Pawar	Former MLC
Satish Chaturvedi	Former MLA
Suresh Kalmadi	Former Union Minister and MP
Vilas Muttemwar	Former MP
Gurudas Kamat	Former MP
Mohan Joshi	Former MLC,Senior VP MPCC
Anees Ahmed	Former MLA
Syed Muzaffar Hussain	Former MLC
Sharad Aher	
Rajiv Satav	Former MP and IYC President
Vishwajeet Kadam	MLA from Palus-Kadegaon,Former Minister of Maharashtra Government
Satyajeet Tambe	MLC from Nashik Graduate Constituency
Kunal Raut	MPCC General Secretary

== Protests ==
MPYC protested against the fuel price hike.

MPYC protested against unemployment and Drugs as Naukri Do Nasha Nashi Campaign in Feb 2025

MPYC did campaign against Vote Chori by finding fake voters through door to door voter list screening
