= Karjat Jamkhed Assembly constituency =

Constituency of the Maharashtra legislative assembly in India

Coordinates: 18.55°N 75.01°E

Karjat Jamkhed
- Constituency No. 227 for the Maharashtra Legislative Assembly
- Rohit Pawar, present MLA of Karjat Jamkhed

Constituency details
- Country: India
- Region: Western India
- State: Maharashtra
- District: Ahmednagar
- Lok Sabha constituency: Ahmednagar
- Established: 1962
- Total electors: 348,007
- Reservation: None

Member of Legislative Assembly
- 15th Maharashtra Legislative Assembly
- Incumbent Rohit Rajendra Pawar
- Party: NCP-SP
- Alliance: MVA
- Elected year: 2024

Karjat Jamkhed Assembly constituency is one of the 288 Vidhan Sabha (legislative assembly) constituencies of Maharashtra state, western India. This constituency is located in Ahmednagar district.

== Geographical scope ==
The constituency comprises Karjat taluka and Jamkhed taluka.

== Members of the Legislative Assembly ==
Year	Member	Party
2009	Ram Shinde	Bharatiya Janata Party
2014	Ram Shinde	Bharatiya Janata Party
2019	Rohit Rajendra Pawar	Nationalist Congress Party
2024	Rohit Rajendra Pawar	Nationalist Congress Party – Sharadchandra Pawar

== Election results ==
=== Assembly Election 2024 ===
2024 Maharashtra Legislative Assembly election : Karjat Jamkhed
Party	Candidate	Votes	%	±%
NCP-SP	Rohit Rajendra Pawar	127,676	48.65%	New
BJP	Prof. Ram Shankar Shinde	126,433	48.17%	▲9.24
Independent	Rohit Chandrakant Pawar	3,489	1.33%	New
NOTA	None of the Above	601	0.23%	▼0.14
Margin of victory		1,243	0.47%	▼17.78
Turnout		263,050	75.59%	▲1.39
Total valid votes		262,449		
Registered electors		348,007		▲8.47
NCP-SP gain from NCP		Swing	▼8.54	

=== Assembly Election 2019 ===
2019 Maharashtra Legislative Assembly election : Karjat Jamkhed
Party	Candidate	Votes	%	±%
NCP	Rohit Rajendra Pawar	135,824	57.19%	▲33.41
BJP	Prof. Ram Shankar Shinde	92,477	38.94%	▼4.37
VBA	Arun Housrao Jadhav	3,849	1.62%	New
Independent	Ram Rangnath Shinde	2,070	0.87%	New
NOTA	None of the Above	867	0.37%	▼0.26
Margin of victory		43,347	18.25%	▼1.23
Turnout		238,537	74.35%	▲8.39
Total valid votes		237,493		
Registered electors		320,843		▲8.50
NCP gain from BJP		Swing	▲13.88	

=== Assembly Election 2014 ===
2014 Maharashtra Legislative Assembly election : Karjat Jamkhed
Party	Candidate	Votes	%	±%
BJP	Prof. Ram Shankar Shinde	84,058	43.31%	▲18.29
SS	Khade Ramesh Bhivrao	46,242	23.83%	New
NCP	Phalke Jaysingrao Anandrao	46,164	23.79%	New
INC	Prof. Kiran Annasaheb Patil	9,477	4.88%	▼14.19
BSP	Kapase Dagadu Bapurao	2,408	1.24%	New
NOTA	None of the Above	1,219	0.63%	New
Independent	Anil Viswnath Samudra	1,176	0.61%	New
Margin of victory		37,816	19.48%	▲13.55
Turnout		195,370	66.07%	▼0.20
Total valid votes		194,084		
Registered electors		295,715		▲13.67
BJP hold		Swing	▲18.29	

=== Assembly Election 2009 ===
2009 Maharashtra Legislative Assembly election : Karjat Jamkhed
Party	Candidate	Votes	%	±%
BJP	Prof. Ram Shankar Shinde	42,845	25.02%	New
INC	Deshmukh Keshavrao Alias Bapusaheb Raosaheb	32,673	19.08%	New
Independent	Prof. Madhu (Aba) Shahurao Ralebhat	28,508	16.65%	New
Independent	Phalke Jaysingrao Anandrao	18,904	11.04%	New
Independent	Pai Pravin (Dada) Vitthalrao Ghule Patil	17,057	9.96%	New
Independent	Ambadas Shankar Pisal	15,586	9.10%	New
MNS	Potare Sachin Sakharam	3,594	2.10%	New
Margin of victory		10,172	5.94%	
Turnout		171,271	65.84%	
Total valid votes		171,270		
Registered electors		260,145		
BJP win (new seat)				
