= Baramati taluka =

Human settlement in India

Coordinates: 18.15°N 74.58°E

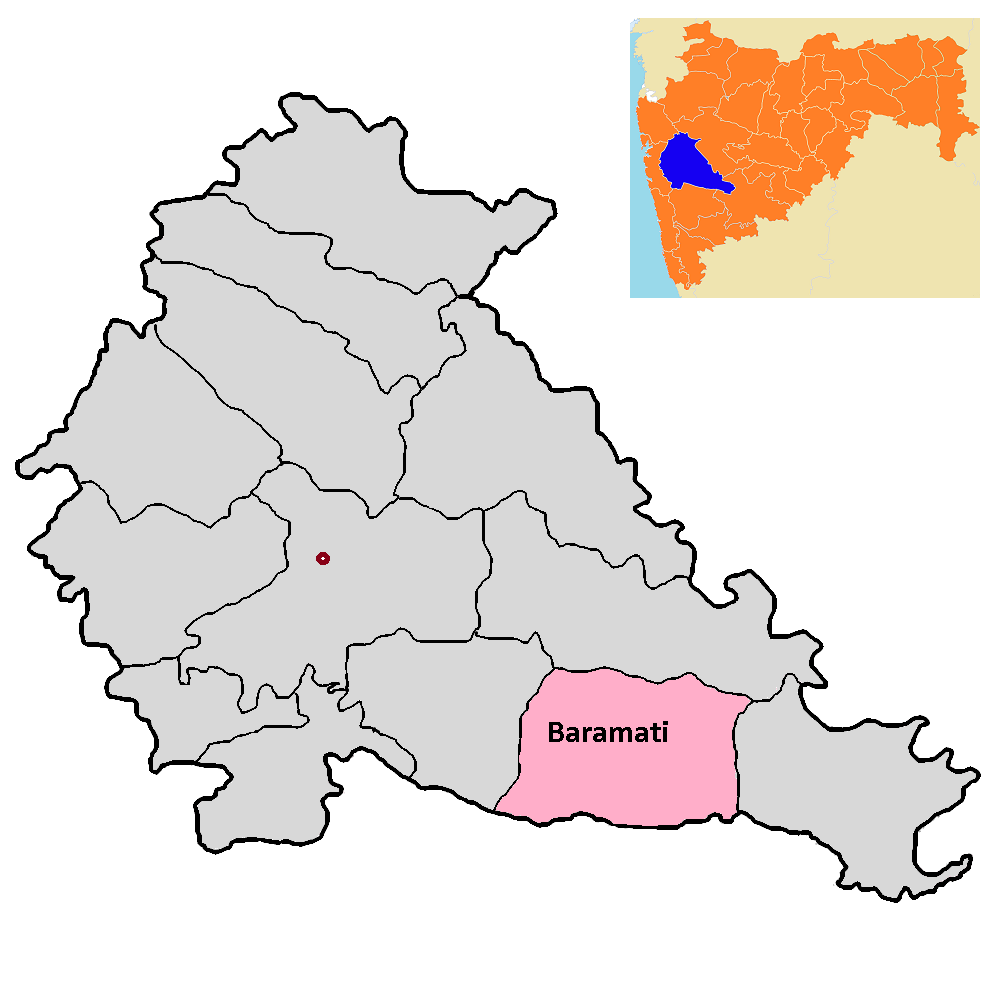
Location of Baramati taluka in Pune district in state of Maharashtra

Baramati taluka is a taluka in Baramati subdivision of Pune district of state of Maharashtra in India.

Baramati Tehsil is located in Western Maharashtra. It belongs to Pune Division. It is located 100 km towards east from district headquarters Pune. 240 km from state capital Mumbai towards east. Baramati tehsil has its head quarter that is Baramati town. Baramati tehsil lies between 18º04΄ to 18°32΄ north latitudes and 74° 26΄to 74° 69΄ east longitudes. It is located at altitude of 550 meters above means sea level.

There are 2 towns and 116 main villages in Baramati Taluka. Baramati Taluka is bounded by Phaltan Taluka towards the South, Daund Taluka towards North, Indapur Taluka towards East and Purandhar Taluka towards West.

== Climate and Rainfall ==
The climate of the Baramati Taluka is slightly different in irrigated and non-irrigated area. The winter season is from December to about the middle of February followed by summer season which last up to May. June to September is the south-west monsoon season, whereas October and November constitute the post-monsoon season. The mean minimum temperature is about 12 °C and means temperature is about 39 °C. The average annual rainfall for the period 2001 to 2012 of Baramati Tahsil was 502 mm. The rainfall analysis indicates study area is drought area (DPAP)

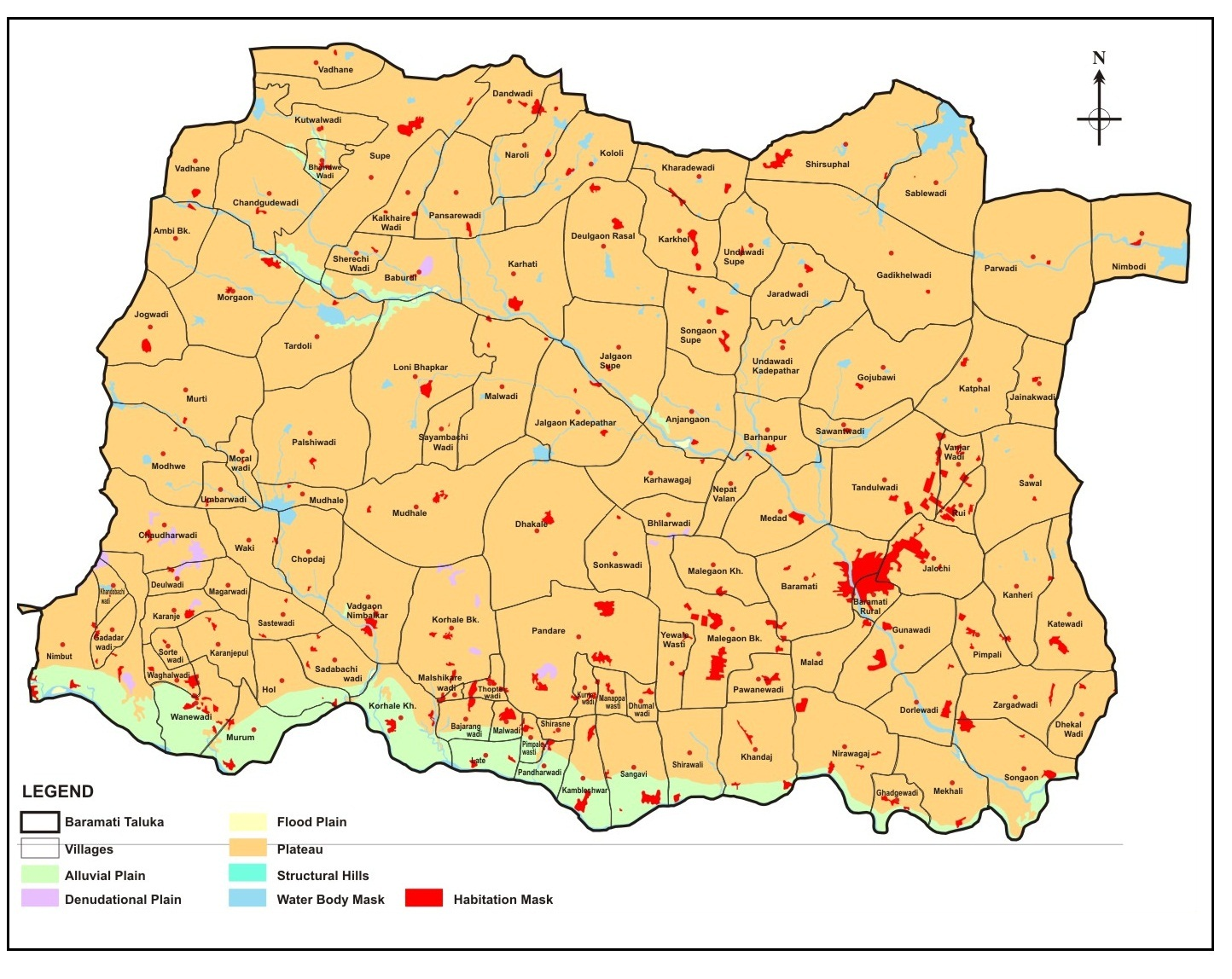
Baramati Geomorphology Map

== Geomorphology ==
Baramati Taluka is located in the eastern belt of Pune district with a rolling topography and the low hills sinking slowly in to the plains with relatively broader valleys. Therefore, the physiography of the tahsil has given rise to two major characteristic land forms namely; (1) the plateau and (2) the plains. The soil of the study area is mainly derived from the Deccan basalts. They are generally fertile except in hilly region. The main types of soil found in study area are black, brownish and gray or white. The soil along the Nira River area is black in colour, fine texture and fertile. The main crop in the Nira River side area is sugarcane. As we approach towards the plateau area the soil graded into coarse textured grayish to white coloured calcrete rich soil. The Tahsil area underlain by the basaltic lava flows of upper Cretaceous to lower Eocene age. Basaltic lava occupies more than 95%.

== Demographics ==
Religions in Baramati taluk (2011)
Religion	Percent
Hinduism	92.11%
Islam	4.83%
Buddhism	1.45%
Jainism	1.06%
Other or not stated	0.55%

Baramati taluka has a population of 429,600 according to the 2011 census. Baramati had a literacy rate of 82.27% and a sex ratio of 943 females per 1000 males. 47,668 (11.10%) are under 7 years of age. 73,761 (17.17%) lived in urban areas. Scheduled Castes and Scheduled Tribes make up 14.98% and 0.92% of the population respectively.

Languages of Baramati taluk (2011)
1. Marathi (93.2%)
2. Hindi (4.59%)
3. Others (2.21%)

At the time of the 2011 Census of India, 93.20% of the population in the district spoke Marathi and 4.59% Hindi as their first language.

== Villages ==
- Dorlewadi
- Karhati
- Jalochi

== See also ==
- Talukas in Pune district
