= Baramati =

Industrial City in Maharashtra, India

Baramati Bhimthadi
- City/Taluka
- Location in Maharashtra, India
- Coordinates: 18.15°N 74.58°E
- Country: India
- State: Maharashtra
- District: Pune

Government
  - Type: Municipal Council for City and Panchayat Samiti for rural area
  - Body: Baramati Municipal Council for City & Baramati Panchayat Samiti for Rural Area
- Elevation: 538 m (1,765 ft)

Population (2011)
  - Total: 54,415
- Demonym: Baramatikar

Languages
  - Official: Marathi
- Time zone: UTC+5:30 (IST)
- PIN: 413102
- Telephone code: 02112
- Vehicle registration: MH-42
- Website: baramatimunicipalcouncil.in

Baramati (बारामती) is a city, tehsil, and municipal council in Pune district of the Indian state of Maharashtra. It is located approximately 100 km southeast of Pune and about 250 km from Mumbai.

== Population ==
According to the 2011 Census, the population of Baramati taluka was 4,29,600 while the population of Baramati city was 54,415.

== Economy ==
Industries in Baramati vary from textiles to dairy and food products. Similarly, there are also many foreign companies in Baramati like Piaggio, Ferrero and Dynamix Dairy. The oldest plant in Baramati MIDC is the Kalyani Steels. Likewise, recent additions to the list of industries are Bharat Forge, Ferrero Rocher, Bauli India and Barry Callebaut India. Baramati and surrounding areas mostly depend on agriculture as the main source of income. The land in the region is moderately irrigated because of the Nira Left Canal irrigation from the Veer Dam. Nira River and Karha River also provide direct irrigation water to the farms. The main crops include Sugarcane, Grapes, Jowar, Cotton, and Wheat. Grapes and Sugar are exported from here. There is a huge marketplace for cotton and food grains in the city.

As the main crop of Baramati is sugarcane, there are three co-operative sugar factories viz. The Someshwar Co-operative Sugar Factory in Someshwarnagar. Shri Chhatrapati Co-operative Sugar Factory, in Bhavaninagar (Indapur). And The Malegaon Co-operative Sugar Factory in Malegaon.

Apart from agriculture, Baramati is home to a lot of industries which range from Steel Processing to Winemaking.

Baramati is home to the three-wheeler plant of the Italian company Piaggio. The construction of a two-wheeler plant is completed, and 150,000 Vespa scooters are produced annually with the initial investment.

Baramati uses 800 hectares of land as MIDC (Maharashtra Industrial Development Corporation) Industrial Area along Baramati-Bhigwan Road, 5 km outside the town's municipal limits. Baramati MIDC has several major companies like Bharat Forge Ltd, ISMT Limited, Imsofer, Senvion, Schreiber Dynamix Dairies Ltd., Piaggio Vehicles Private Limited, Godfrey Phillips, and is home to many small-scale industries.

Baramati MIDC has a Baramati Hi-Tech Textile Park Ltd., set up over a sprawling 60 acres of land which houses small domestic garment manufacturers, consisting of a comprehensive group of textile-oriented units specializing in functions such as garment-making, Apparel Printing & Packaging, Home Furnishing, Embroidery and Technical textile within the Textile Park. It also has a series of smaller units available as ancillary support units.

Baramati has an airstrip near MIDC.

== Climate ==
Climate data for Baramati (1981–2020, extremes 1954–1993)
Month	Jan	Feb	Mar	Apr	May	Jun	Jul	Aug	Sep	Oct	Nov	Dec	Year
Record high °C (°F)	34.8 (94.6)	38.4 (101.1)	41.0 (105.8)	43.6 (110.5)	43.8 (110.8)	42.4 (108.3)	36.7 (98.1)	38.6 (101.5)	39.0 (102.2)	39.8 (103.6)	36.8 (98.2)	34.6 (94.3)	43.8 (110.8)
Mean daily maximum °C (°F)	30.0 (86.0)	32.6 (90.7)	35.9 (96.6)	38.6 (101.5)	38.8 (101.8)	32.8 (91.0)	30.0 (86.0)	29.2 (84.6)	30.7 (87.3)	31.7 (89.1)	30.1 (86.2)	28.6 (83.5)	32.4 (90.3)
Mean daily minimum °C (°F)	13.5 (56.3)	14.6 (58.3)	18.5 (65.3)	21.7 (71.1)	23.3 (73.9)	23.0 (73.4)	22.1 (71.8)	21.7 (71.1)	21.2 (70.2)	19.9 (67.8)	16.3 (61.3)	13.0 (55.4)	19.1 (66.4)
Record low °C (°F)	5.4 (41.7)	6.3 (43.3)	9.6 (49.3)	13.3 (55.9)	15.8 (60.4)	15.8 (60.4)	14.0 (57.2)	17.7 (63.9)	16.8 (62.2)	12.7 (54.9)	8.8 (47.8)	5.0 (41.0)	5.0 (41.0)
Average rainfall mm (inches)	0.6 (0.02)	1.2 (0.05)	2.3 (0.09)	3.5 (0.14)	19.5 (0.77)	88.8 (3.50)	69.3 (2.73)	46.2 (1.82)	168.9 (6.65)	103.4 (4.07)	13.8 (0.54)	13.5 (0.53)	531.0 (20.91)
Average rainy days	0.1	0.2	0.4	0.4	1.9	5.5	5.2	3.7	8.2	4.2	0.9	0.7	31.4
Average relative humidity (%) (at 17:30 IST)	31	21	18	17	24	52	62	63	59	44	38	38	39
Source: India Meteorological Department

== Geography ==
Baramati is located on the Deccan plateau, southwest of Pune, at 18.15°N 74.58°E. It has an average elevation of 538 meters (1765 feet). Baramati town has fortifications which are visible even today, and it may be considered as a fortified town (bhuikot) and it reached its acme of military importance under the Moghuls.

== Transport ==
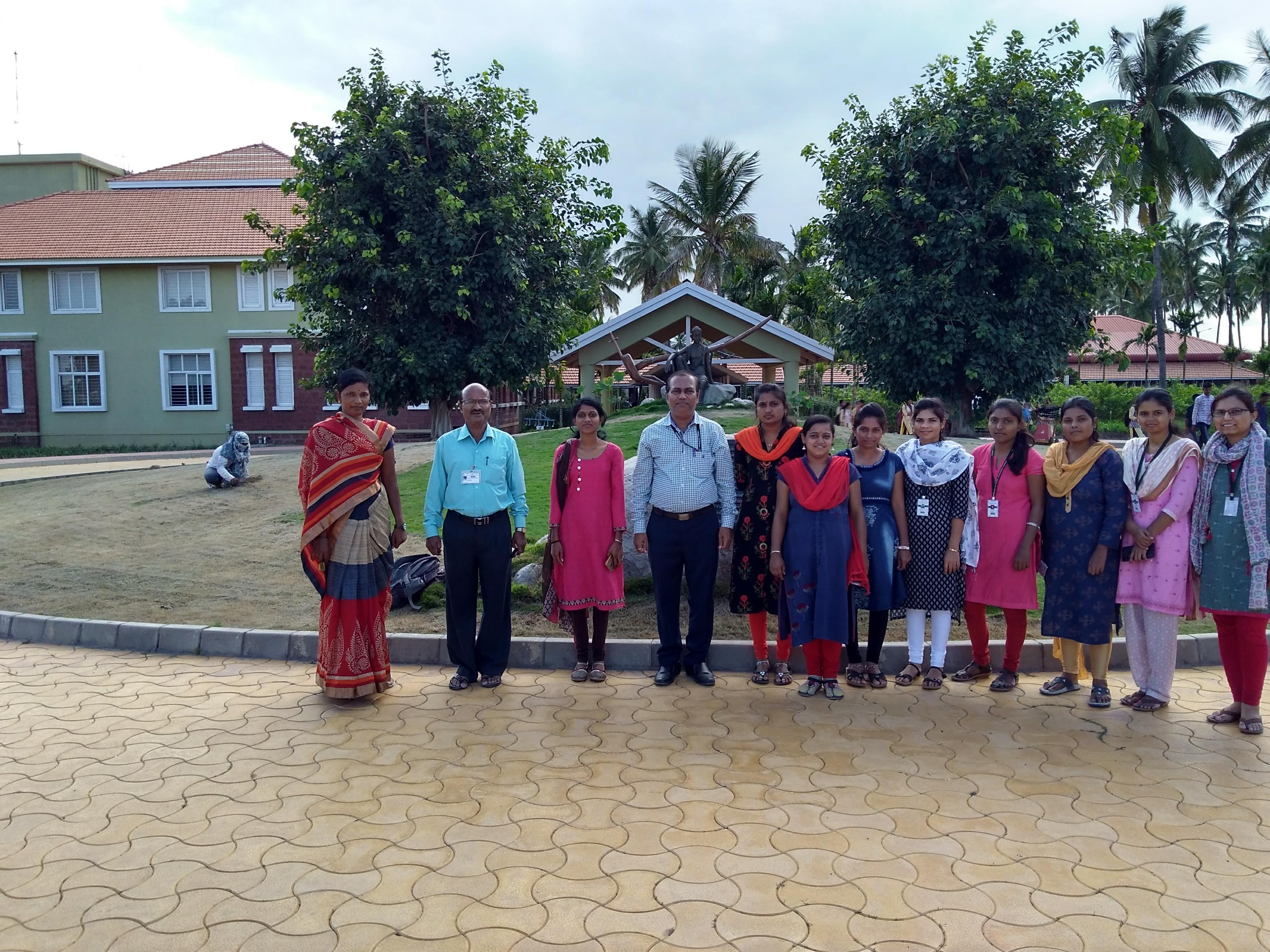
Krishi Vigyan Kendra, Baramati

Baramati is well connected by road with major cities in the State. It is 100 km from Pune by road. It connects to major highways via the road network. Baramati is also well connected by the rail network to Pune via Daund Junction. Baramati has two bus stands, with the main bus stand located at Indapur Road. Baramati bus depot provides buses to school children.

Baramati has an airport (Baramati Airport) which currently hosts two Flying Schools.

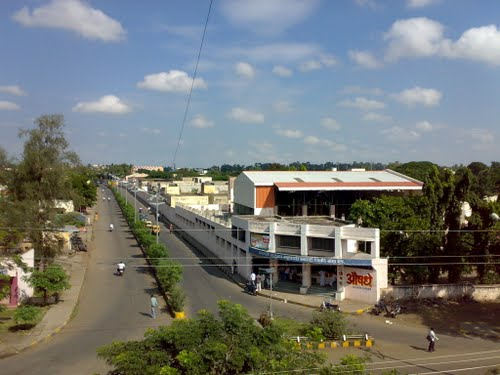
Market Yard Rd, Baramati.

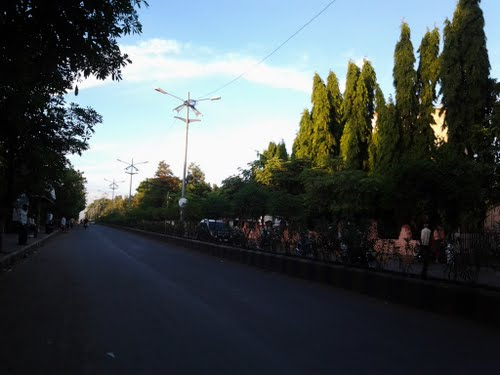
Station Road, Baramati.

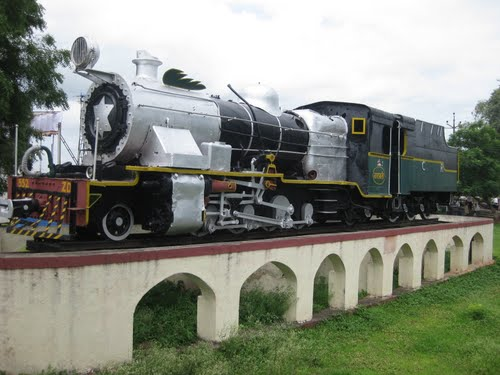
Old steam engine (imported by India in 1957) at Baramati Railway Station

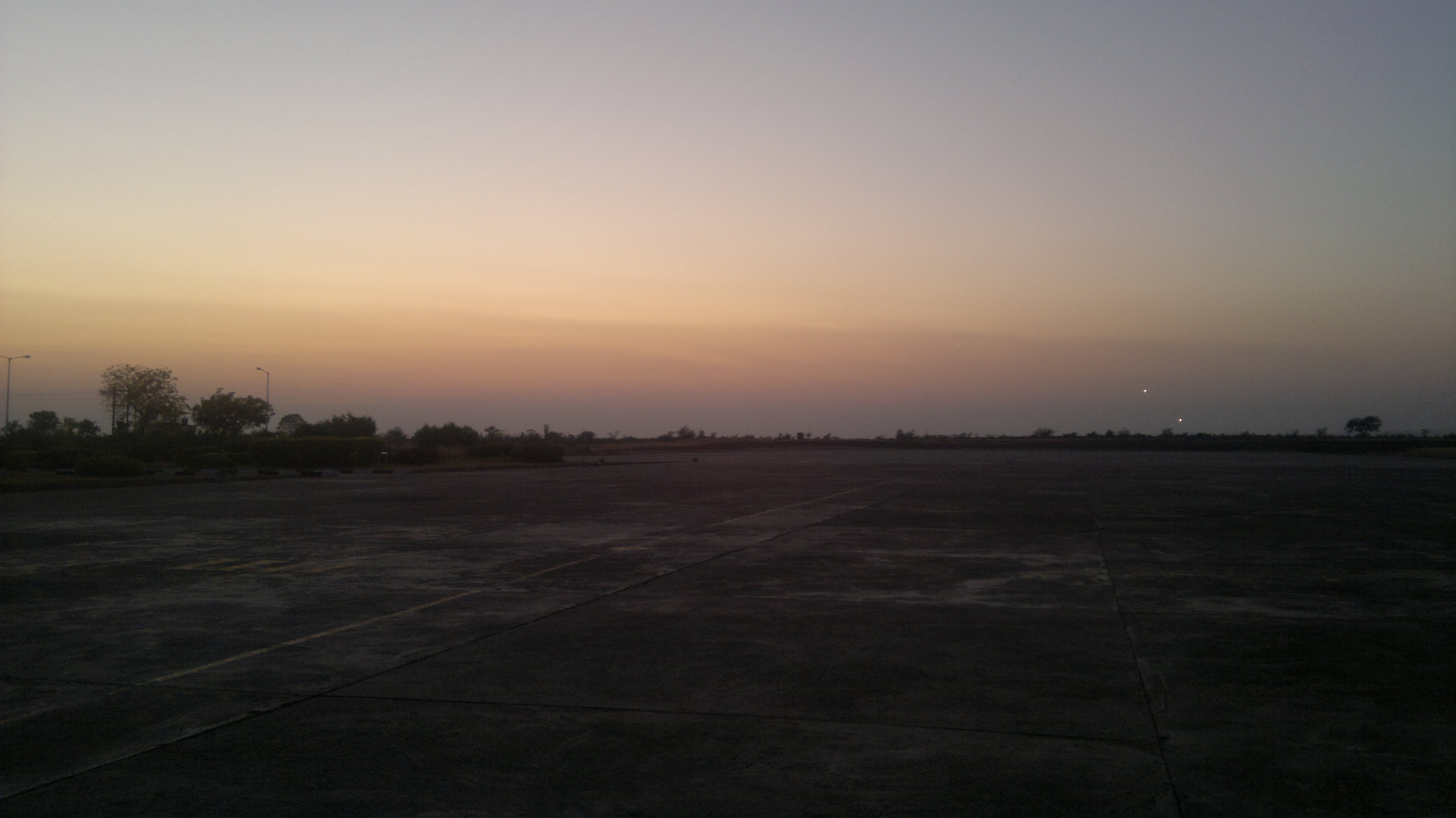
AIR PORT RAMP

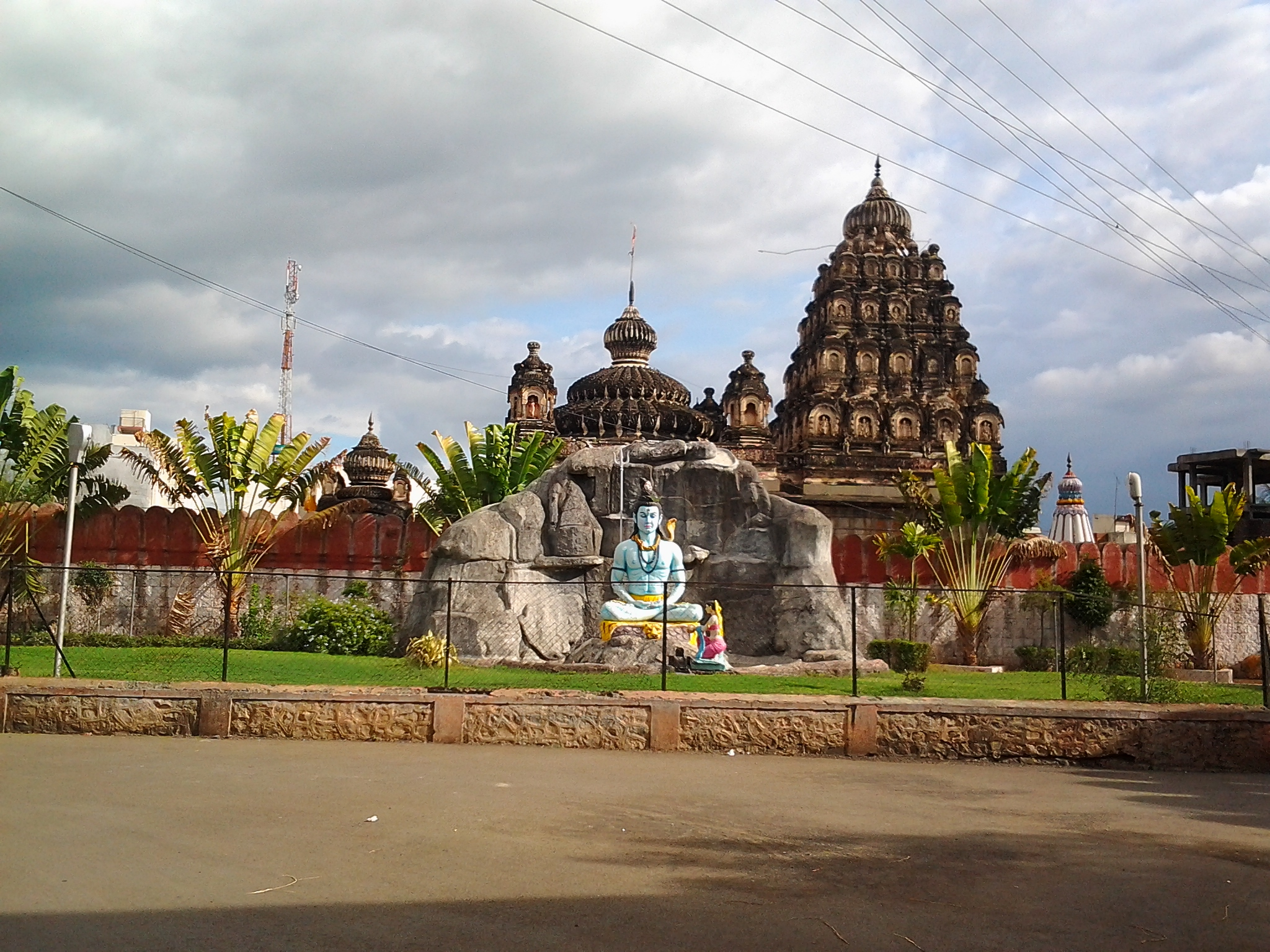
Siddheswar Temple Baramati

== Hospitals ==
1. Silver Jubilee Sub District Hospital, Bhigwan Chowk, Baramati
2. Government of Maharashtra, Rural Hospital, Rui, MIDC, Baramati
3. Government Women Hospital, MIDC, Baramati
4. Baramati Hospital, Behind Moropant Sabhagruh, Baramati.
5. Chandgude Accident Hospital,Bhigwan Road, Baramati

== Places to visit ==
=== Shri Mayureshwar Mandir ===
Shri Mayureshwar Mandir or Shri Moreshwar Mandir also known as Morgaon Ganpati is a Hindu temple (mandir) dedicated to Lord Ganesha, the elephant-headed god of wisdom. It is located in Morgaon (Marathi: मोरगाव) Baramati in Pune District, about 35 km away from Baramati city. The temple is the starting and ending point of a pilgrimage of the eight revered Ganesha temples called Ashtavinayaka.

=== Babuji Naik Wada ===
In 1743, Babuji Naik built a magnificent fort on the banks of river Karha flowing through Baramati city. This fort is a glorious witness to the history of Bhimathadi to Baramati. With this in mind, the castle will be renovated. A museum will be set up in this palace and it will reveal the biography of Babuji Naik from 1743 to 1780. Tourists will also get to see the social, cultural, and historical events from 1780 to 2014 and the historical stone inscriptions in Baramati taluka. The ramparts of the fort will be repaired and tourists will be able to walk on the ramparts. At the same time, the collapsed area of the bastion, the town hall, and the main entrance will be rebuilt.

=== Bhigwan Bird Sanctuary ===
Bhigwan is a small town 25 km from Baramati. It can be reached from Bhigwan by state transport bus from Baramati. Bhigwan bird sanctuary is 10 km away from Bhigwan town but it is difficult to reach by public transportation. There are two places with several types of migratory birds: Diksal and Kumbhargaon. There is a dam called Ujani. The backwater is spread in the nearest parts of the villages. These birds can be found around this backwater area of Diksal. Diksal is 7 km away from Bhigwan. Small fishing boats can be hired for watching more birds. An outdoor activity where tourists look for pink flamingos and more at the Bhigwan bird sanctuary on a full-day tour from Pune. In addition to seeing a variety of India's bird species, visit the historic Bhuleshwar Temple along the way.

=== The Janvastu Sangrahalaya /Museum ===
The two-stored museum holds a collection of gifts received by eminent Indian politician, Sharad Pawar during his long career in public service. The museum also has a collection of photographs that chronicles the public life of Mr. Sharad Pawar.

=== Krishi Vigyan Kendra Baramati ===
Krishi Vigyan Kendra (Farmers Science center), Baramati was established on 1 August 1992 under the affiliation ICAR. From 1992 to 2008, the operational area of KVK was the whole Pune district, but after the establishment of the new KVK in the Pune district, the operational area is reduced to the 7 tehsils of the Pune district. Krishi Vigyan Kendra, Baramati is a model Hi-tech & National award-winning KVK of India working for the farming community for twenty-four years for the development of sustainable agriculture. The aim of Krishi Vigyan Kendra is to reduce the time lag between the technology transfer from research institutions to the farmer's field for increasing production, productivity, and income from the agriculture and allied sectors on a sustained basis.

=== KRUSHIK - Agri Technology Week ===
The Krishi Vigyan Kendra, Baramati, Maharashtra organizes the “KRUSHIK - Agri Technology Week" every year at KVK Baramati after the Diwali festival. It is the brainchild of Mr. Rajendra Pawar and Mrs. Sunanda Rajendra Pawar.

=== Shri Shirsai Mandir (Shirsuphal) ===
Shri Shirsai Mandir is a Hindu temple dedicated to Goddess Shirsai. It is located in Shirsuphal, Baramati in Pune District, about 27.4 km from Baramati city in the Indian state of Maharashtra. There are many Monkeys in this temple as well as in the village of Shirsuphal. This village is also called the "Monkeys Village".

=== Shri Janai Mandir (Katphal) ===
Shri Janai Mandir is a Hindu temple dedicated to Goddess Janai. It is located in Katphal, Baramati in Pune District, about 7 km from Baramati city in the Indian state of Maharashtra.

== Notable people ==
- Nathuram Godse - assassin of Mahatma Gandhi.
- Moropant - 18th-century Marathi poet.
- Naik family - bankers and courtiers at the Peshwa darbar in the 1700s.
- Kumar N Patel - Indian-American engineer and inventor.
- Pawar family (politicians)
  - Ajit Pawar
  - Rohit Rajendra Pawar
  - Sharad Pawar
  - Sunanda Rajendra Pawar
  - Supriya Sule
- Other politicians
  - Sitaram Aadivashi
  - Sambhajirao Kakade
