= Inner Ring Road, Pune =

Planned road in Pune, India

Pune Inner Ring Road

Route information
- Maintained by Pune Metropolitan Region Development Authority, Pune Municipal Corporation, Pimpri-Chinchwad Municipal Corporation
- Length: 105 km (65 mi)

Major junctions
- Anti-clockwise end: Chimbli Moi
- NH 60 to Nashik; NH 48 to Mumbai; Mumbai–Pune Expressway to Mumbai; NH 48 to Bengaluru; NH 965 to Saswad, Palkhi Marg; NH 65 to Solapur; NH 753F to Ahmednagar
- Clockwise end: Chimbli

Location
- Country: India
- State: Maharashtra
- Major cities: Pune, Pimpri-Chinchwad

Highway system
- Roads in India; Expressways; National; State; Asian; State Highways in Maharashtra

Pune Inner Ring Road or PMRDA Ring Road is a ring road currently under construction around the city of Pune, India. When completed, the road will be 173 km long and serve twenty-nine villages by connecting the city's existing highways. The cost of building the route is estimated at ₹104.08 billion (US$1.1 billion). The Pune Metropolitan Region Development Authority (PMRDA) claims that the road will decrease traffic congestion and provide better access to the fastest-growing areas.

The PMRDA, Pimpri-Chinchwad Municipal Corporation, and Pune Municipal Corporation are responsible for planning and land acquisition. The Public Works Department suggested that the design–finance–build–operate–transfer model be used.

== History ==
On 12 July 2007, Maharashtra Chief Minister Sri Vilasrao Deshmukh proposed a ring road around the city of Pune. The Pune District Guardian Minister proposed that the road be 120 meters wide and include service roads.

On 16 January 2014, the Government of Maharashtra approved the Maharashtra State Road Development Corporation's proposal for preparing a detailed project report.

The government announced the formation of the Pune Metropolitan Region Development Authority on 2 April 2015. The PMRDA prioritizes Metro and Ring Road works. On 26 July 2015, Pune NCP leader Ajit Pawar described irregularities in the detailed project report. The Maharashtra Chief Minister Devendra Fadnavis announced a new survey, and the work was given to the PMRDA. On 7 November 2015, PMRDA completed the land survey. The Maharashtra State Road Development Corporation planned to take measures to commence construction.

On 8 November 2019, Times of India reported that according to the PMRDA, only 24% of the land required for the first phase had been acquired and "officials are awaiting central funds to speed up the project."

== Details ==
The ring road will be 105 km long when completed. The road will consist of two lanes in each direction, and will include eight flyovers, four bridges over railways, seven viaducts, fourteen subway roads, thirteen tunnels (with a total subterranean distance of 3.75 km). It will cost an estimated ₹104.08 billion (US$1.1 billion). The total land used for the project will be 48 hectares (120 acres) of government-owned land, and 25 hectares (62 acres) of privately owned land.

== Planning ==
This project will be completed in four phases:

1. Phase 1: Theurphata – NH 65 – Kesnand – Wagholi – Charholi – Bhavdi – Tulapur – Alandi – Kelgaon – Chimbli – NH 60
2. Phase 2: NH 60 – Chimbli Moi – Nighoje – Sangurde – Shelarwadi – Chandkhed – Pachne – Pimploli – Rihe – Ghotawde – Pirangutphata
3. Phase 3: Pirangutphata – Bhugaon – Chandni Chowk – Ambegaon – Katraj
4. Phase 4: Ambegaon – Katraj – Mangdewadi – Wadachiwadi – Holkarwadi – Wadkinaka – Ramdara – Theurphata – NH 65

== See also ==
- Outer Ring Road, Pune
- High-capacity mass transit route, Pune
- List of roads in Pune
