= Ring road =

Type of road encircling a settlement

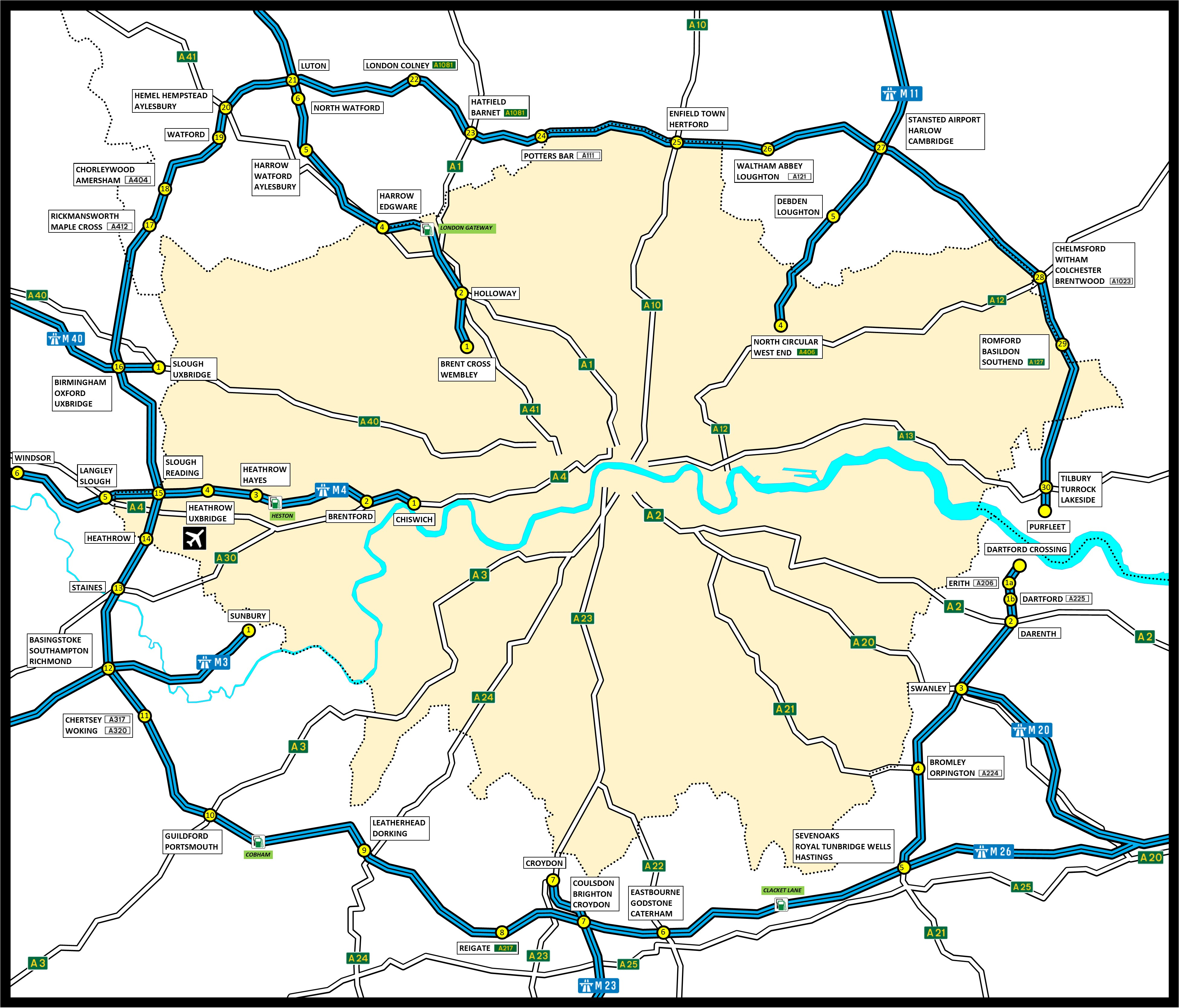
M25, the primary ring road of London

A ring road (also known as circular road, beltline, beltway, circumferential (high)way, loop or orbital) is a road or a series of connected roads encircling a town, city or country. The most common purpose of a ring road is to assist in reducing traffic volumes in the urban centre, such as by offering an alternate route around the city for drivers who do not need to stop in the city core. Ring roads can also serve to connect suburbs to each other, allowing efficient travel between them.

== Nomenclature ==
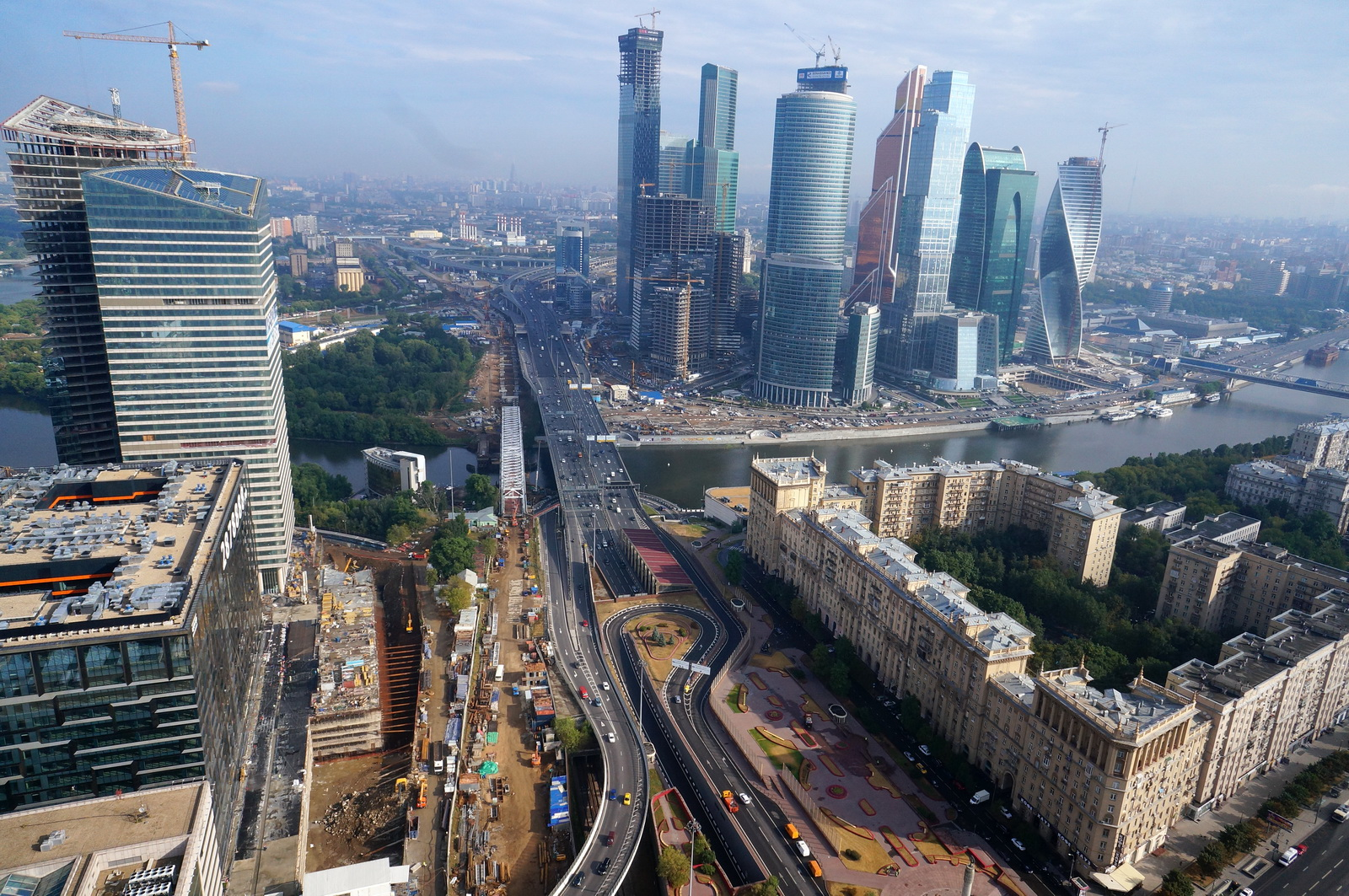
The Third Ring Road in the area of the Moscow International Business Center

The name "ring road" is used for the majority of metropolitan circumferential routes in Europe, such as the Berliner Ring, the Brussels Ring, the Amsterdam Ring and the Leeds Inner and Outer ring roads. Australia, Pakistan, and India also use the term ring road, as in Melbourne's Western Ring Road, Lahore's Lahore Ring Road and Hyderabad's Outer Ring Road. In Canada the term is the most commonly used, with "orbital" also used, but to a much lesser extent.

In Europe and Australia, some ring roads, particularly longer ones of motorway standard, are known as "orbital motorways". Examples are the London Orbital (generally known as the M25; 188 km), Sydney Orbital Network (110 km), and Rome Orbital (68 km).

In the United States many ring roads are called beltlines, beltways or loops, such as the Capital Beltway around Washington, D.C. Some ring roads, such as Washington's Capital Beltway, use "Inner Loop" and "Outer Loop" terminology for directions of travel, since cardinal (compass) directions cannot be signed uniformly around the entire loop. The term 'ring road' is occasionally – and inaccurately – used interchangeably with the term 'bypass'.

== Background ==
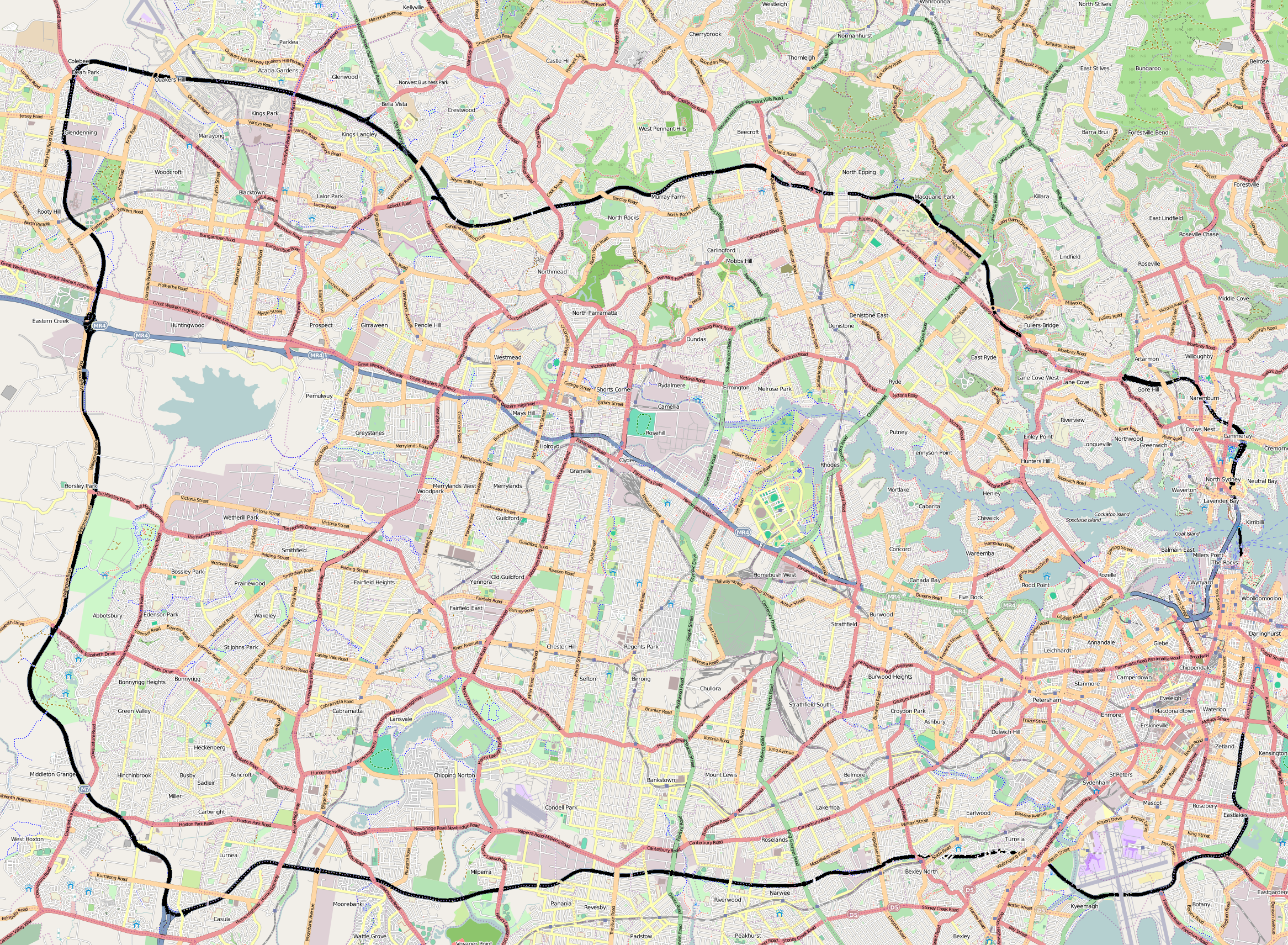
The Sydney Orbital Network, New South Wales, Australia

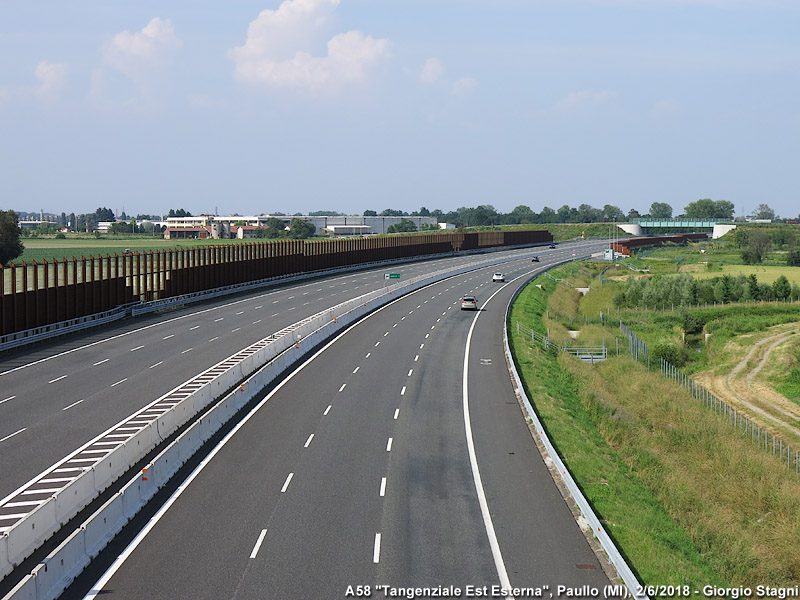
The Autostrada A58, the Milan external east ring road, Italy. Together with the Autostrada A50 (Milan west ring road), the Autostrada A51 (Milan east ring road) and the Autostrada A52 (Milan north ring road), it is the largest system of ring roads around a city in Italy, for a total length greater than 100 kilometres (62 mi).

Bypasses around many large and small towns were built in many areas when many old roads were converted to four-lane status in the 1930s to 1950s, such as those along the Old National Road (now generally U.S. 40 or Interstate 70) in the United States, leaving the old road in place to serve the town or city, but allowing through travelers to continue on a wider, faster and safer route.

Construction of fully circumferential ring roads has generally occurred more recently, beginning in the 1960s in many areas, when the U.S. Interstate Highway System and similar-quality roads elsewhere were designed. Ring roads have now been built around numerous cities and metropolitan areas, including cities with multiple ring roads, irregularly shaped ring roads and ring roads made up of various other long-distance roads.

London has three ring roads (the M25 motorway, the North and South Circular roads and the Inner Ring Road). Birmingham also has three ring roads which consist of the Birmingham Box; the A4540, commonly known as the Middleway; and the A4040, the Outer Ring Road. Birmingham once had a fourth ring road, the A4400. This has been partially demolished and downgraded to improve traffic flow into the city. Other British cities have two: Leeds, Sheffield, Norwich and Glasgow. Cleveland, OH and San Antonio, TX, in the United States, also each have two, while Houston, Texas will have three official ring roads (not including the downtown freeway loop). Some cities have far more – Beijing, for example, has six ring roads, simply numbered in increasing order from the city center (though skipping #1), while Moscow has five, three innermost (Central Squares of Moscow, Boulevard Ring and Garden Ring) corresponding to the concentric lines of fortifications around the ancient city, and the two outermost (MKAD and Third Ring) built in the twentieth century, though, confusingly, the Third Ring was built last.

Geographical constraints can complicate the construction of a complete ring road. For example, the Baltimore Beltway in Maryland formerly crossed Baltimore Harbor on a high arch bridge prior to its collapse in 2024, and much of the partially completed Stockholm Ring Road in Sweden runs through tunnels or over long bridges. Some towns or cities on sea coasts or near rugged mountains cannot have a full ring road. Examples of such partial ring roads are Dublin's ring road; and, in the US, Interstate 287, mostly in New Jersey (bypassing New York City), and Interstate 495 around Boston, none of which completely circles these seaport cities.

In other cases, adjacent international boundaries may prevent ring road completion. Construction of a true ring road around Detroit is effectively blocked by its location on the border with Canada and the Detroit River; although constructing a route mostly or entirely outside city limits is technically feasible, a true ring around Detroit would necessarily pass through Canada, and so Interstate 275 and Interstate 696 together bypass but do not encircle the city. Sometimes, the presence of significant natural or historical areas limits route options, as for the long-proposed Outer Beltway around Washington, D.C., where options for a new western Potomac River crossing are limited by a nearly continuous corridor of heavily visited scenic, natural, and historical landscapes in the Potomac River Gorge and adjacent areas.

When referring to a road encircling a capital city, the term "beltway" can also have a political connotation, as in the American term "Inside the Beltway", derived metonymically from the Capital Beltway encircling Washington, D.C.

== Impact ==
Ring roads decentralize traffic by providing alternative routes around the city, allowing through-traffic and freight flows to bypass the urban core. This relieves pressure on heavily congested inner-city roads and reduces the volume of unwanted transit movements that would otherwise enter central districts. At the same time, orbitals reshape metropolitan structure: accessibility often becomes highest along the ring, drawing economic activity and population towards suburban areas. This decentralization can increase car dependence and generate new inter-suburban traffic, which over time may erode some of the initial congestion benefits.

A comparative analysis of ring-road schemes in multiple cities concluded that orbital roads tend to relieve congestion only temporarily, as traffic volumes rise again through induced demand. The study found that long-term congestion reduction requires combining ring roads with comprehensive travel-demand management measures, such as improved public transport, congestion charging, and compact land-use planning, rather than relying on road construction alone.

Ring roads have been criticised for inducing demand, leading to more car journeys being taken and thus higher levels of pollution being created. By creating easy access by car to large areas of land, they can also act as a catalyst for development, leading to urban sprawl and car-centric planning. Ring roads have also been criticised for splitting communities and being difficult to navigate for pedestrians and cyclists.

== Examples ==
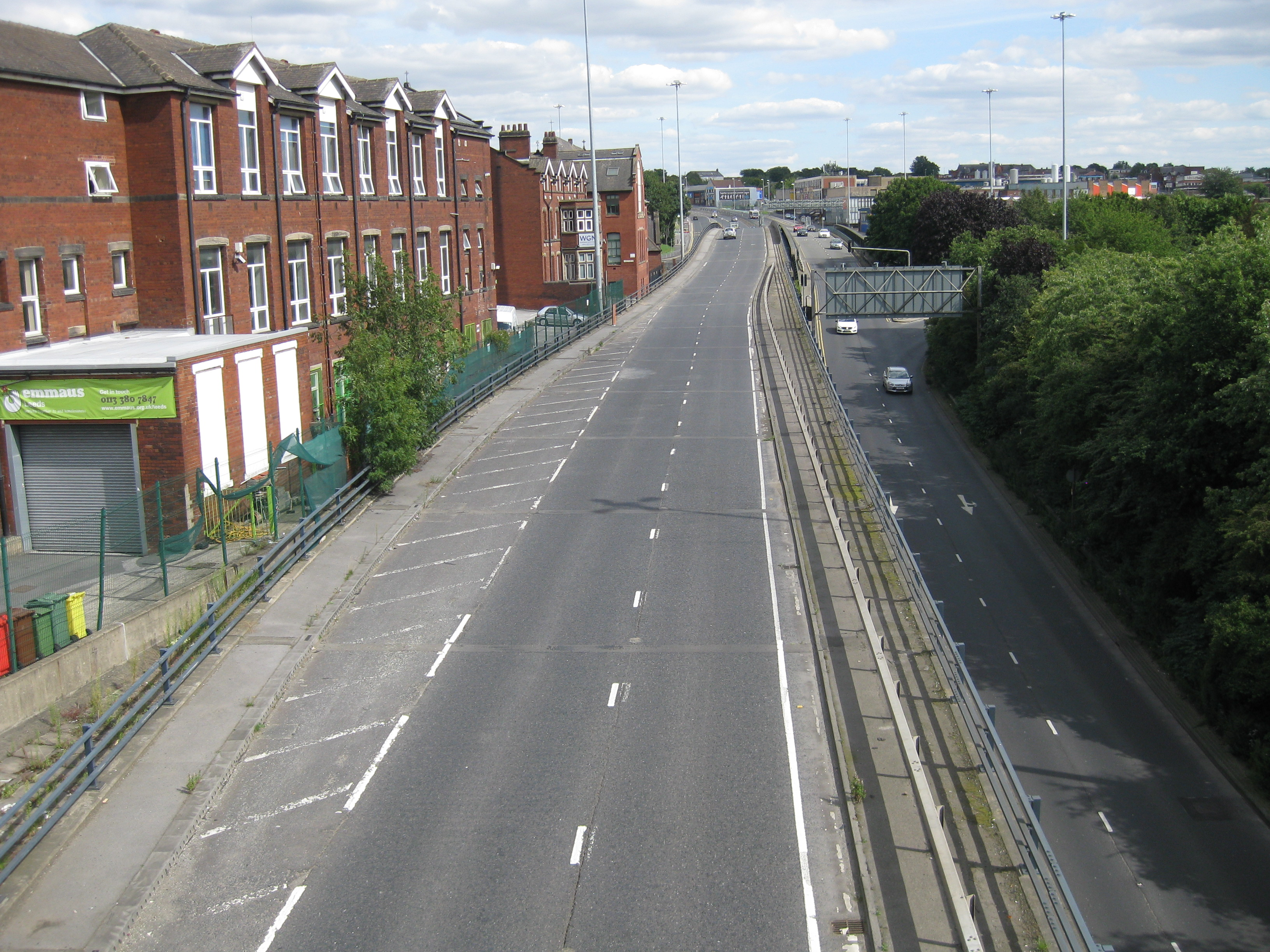
The Leeds Inner Ring Road in England was built in a series of tunnels to save space and avoid physically separating the city's centre from its suburbs.

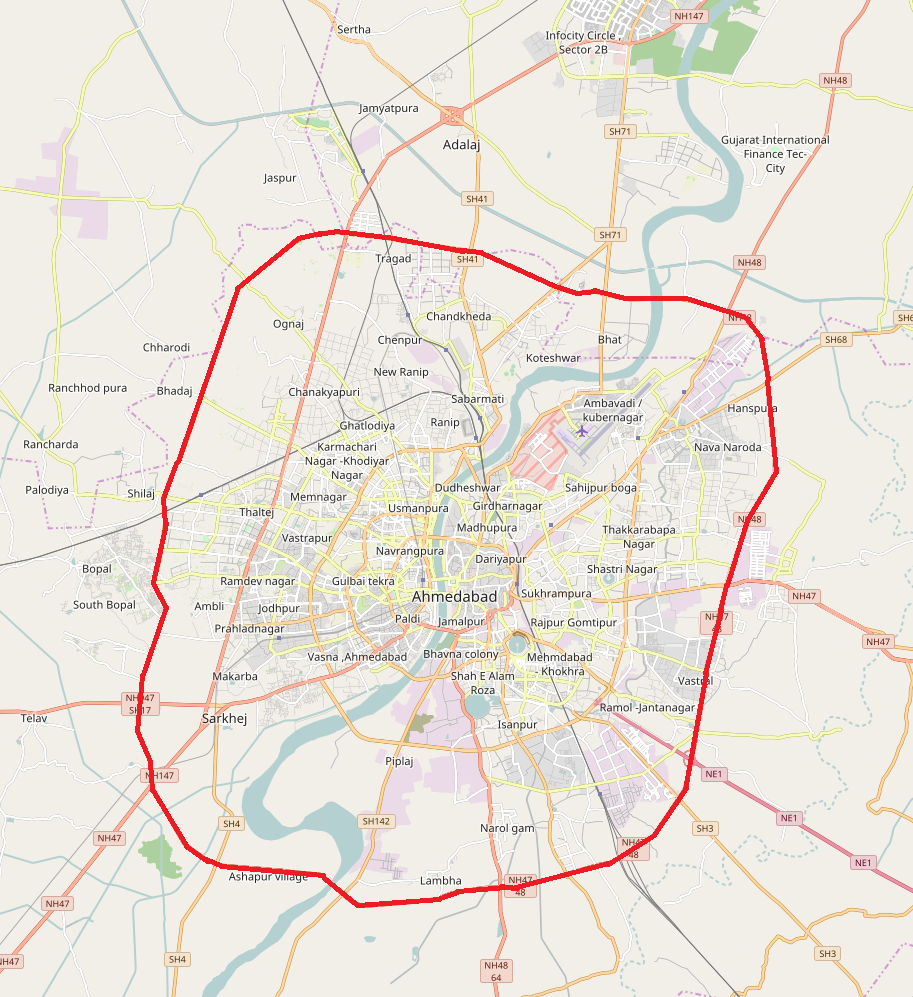
Sardar Patel Ring Road, Ahmedabad

Most orbital motorways (or beltways) are purpose-built major highways around a town or city, typically without either signals or road or railroad crossings. In the United States, beltways are commonly parts of the Interstate Highway System. Similar roads in the United Kingdom are often called "orbital motorways". Although the terms "ring road" and "orbital motorway" are sometimes used interchangeably, "ring road" often indicates a circumferential route formed from one or more existing roads within a city or town, with the standard of road being anything from an ordinary city street up to motorway level. An excellent example of this is London's North Circular/South Circular ring roads, which are largely made up of (mainly congested) ordinary city streets.

In some cases, a circumferential route is formed by the combination of a major through highway and a similar-quality loop route that extends out from the parent road, later reconnecting with the same highway. Such loops not only function as a bypass for through traffic, but also to serve outlying suburbs. In the United States, an Interstate highway loop is usually designated by a three-digit number beginning with an even digit before the two-digit number of its parent interstate. Interstate spurs, on the other hand, generally have three-digit numbers beginning with an odd digit.

=== United States ===
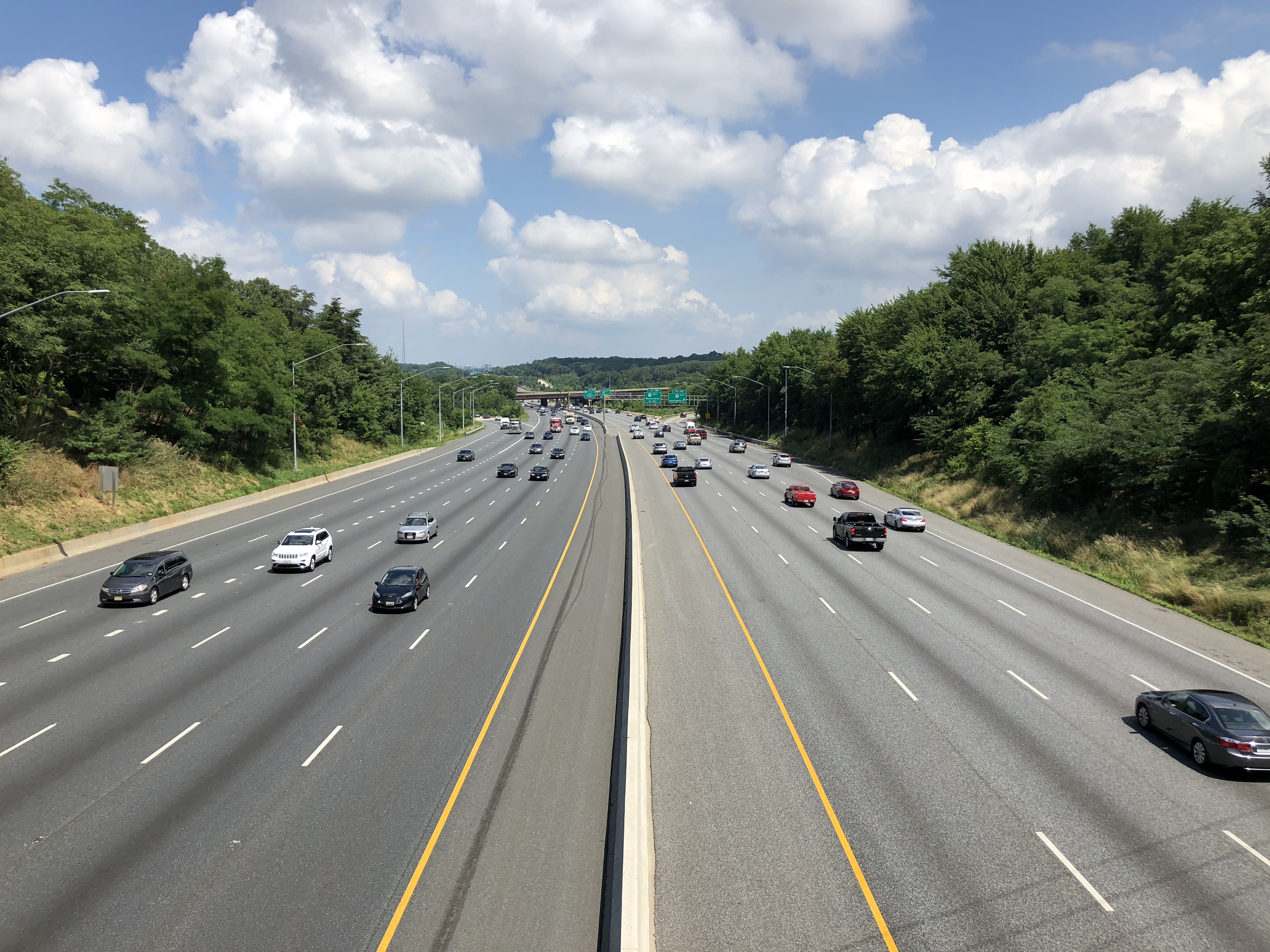
The Capital Beltway around Washington, DC

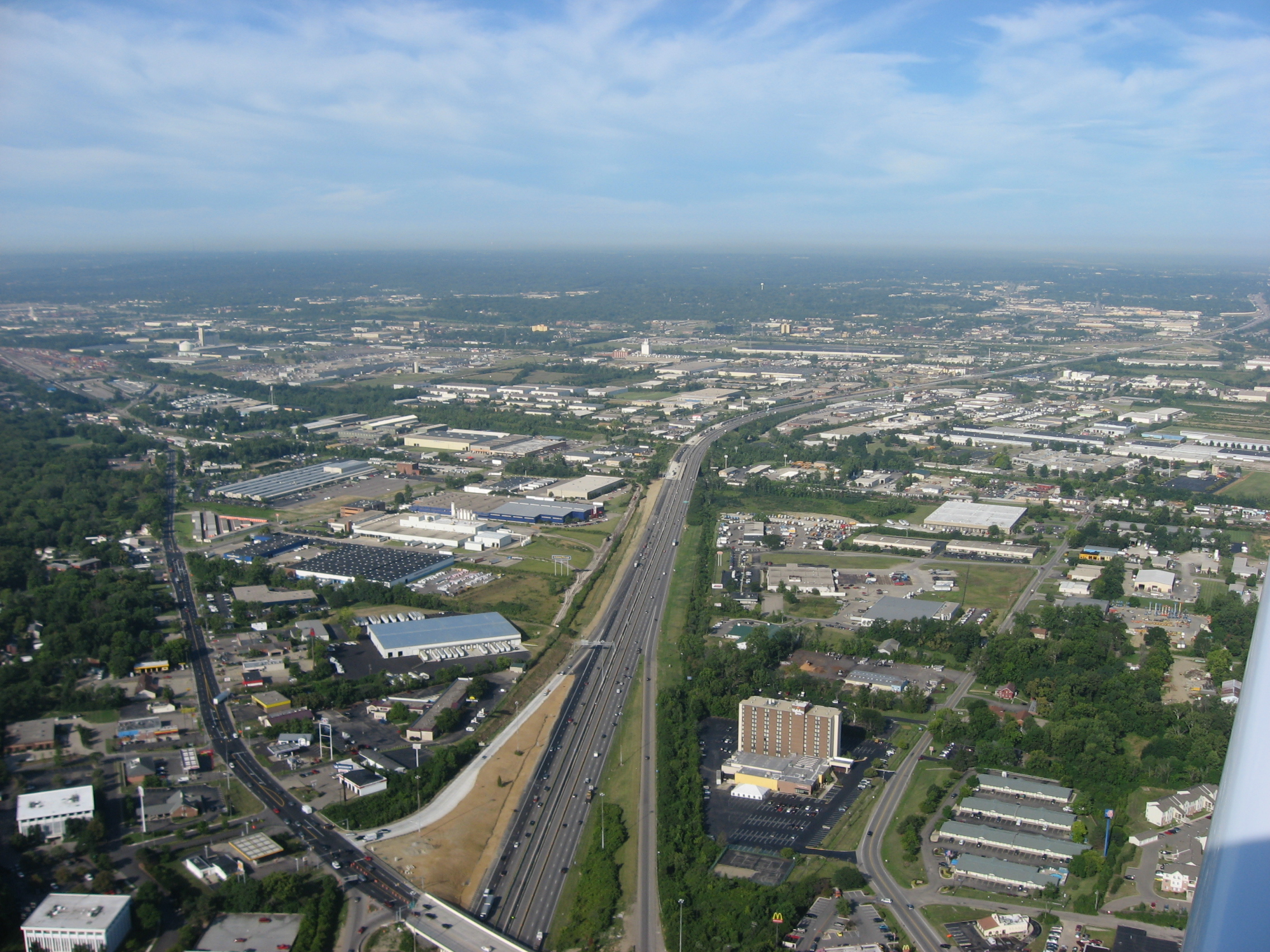
I-275 passing through Sharonville (suburb of Cincinnati, OH)

Within the United States, even numbered three digit interstate highways act as circumferential routes of the two digit parent interstate. Some instances (such as Interstate 495, DC) completely circle, while some (such as Interstate 495, MA) partially loop, either due to geographical or cancelled/non-completed highways. Within cities, ring roads sometimes have local nicknames; these include Washington DC's Interstate 495 (The "Capital Beltway"), Interstate 270 in Columbus, Ohio (The "Outerbelt"), and Interstate 285 in Atlanta (The "Perimeter").

The longest complete beltway in the United States is the Charles W. Anderson Loop, a 94-mile (151 km) loop in Texas that forms a complete loop around the Greater San Antonio area.

The longest complete belt road, or a beltway that is only two lanes, in the United States is Hawaii Belt Road, a 260-mile (420 km) belt in Hawaii that forms a complete belt road around Hawaii Island.

Other major U.S. cities with such a beltway superhighway:

- Atlanta, Georgia—Interstate 285 (the Perimeter)
- Athens, Georgia—Georgia State Route 10 Loop/Athens Perimeter
- Augusta, Georgia/North Augusta, South Carolina—Interstate 520, and Interstate 20
- Baltimore—Interstate 695 formerly including the Francis Scott Key Bridge
- Boston—Route 128/Interstate 95 and Interstate 93/U.S. Route 1 form an inner beltway, and Interstate 495 (Massachusetts) forms an outer beltway. Inside the inner Route 128/I-95 and I-93/US 1 beltway, there were proposals (since canceled) for another beltway (at the time called the "Inner Belt" that would have carried Interstate 695; I-95 would have entered Boston via the Southwest Corridor (Since redeveloped as part of the Northeast Corridor Mile Posts 217.3-228.7), while the rest of the belt would have carried Interstate 695.
- Birmingham, Alabama—Interstate 459 and proposed/under construction Interstate 422
- Charlotte, North Carolina—Interstate 485, and Interstate 277
- Cincinnati—Interstate 275
- Cleveland—Interstate 271 and Interstate 480
- Columbia, South Carolina—Interstate 26, Interstate 77, and Interstate 20
- Columbus, Ohio—Interstate 270
- Dallas—Downtown Circulator, Interstate 20/Interstate 635/Loop 12/Spur 408, and President George Bush Turnpike
- Denver—(Partial) Colorado State Highway 470 and E-470
- Des Moines, Iowa-Interstate 35/Interstate 80, U.S. Route 69, Iowa Highway 5
- Detroit—Interstate 275 and Interstate 696
- Dothan, Alabama—Ross Clark Circle; U.S. Route 231, U.S. Route 431, U.S. Route 84, and Alabama State Route 210
- El Paso, Texas—Loop 375
- Fort Wayne, Indiana—Interstate 69 and Interstate 469
- Fort Worth, Texas—Interstate 20/Interstate 820
- Greensboro, North Carolina—Interstate 85, Interstate 840, Interstate 73
- Hawaii Island—Hawaii Belt Road
- Houston—Interstate 610, Beltway 8, and the Grand Parkway.
- Indianapolis—Interstate 465
- Jacksonville, Florida—Interstate 295
- Kansas City, Kansas/Kansas City, Missouri—Interstate 435
- Lansing, Michigan—Interstate 96, Interstate 69, U.S Route 127 and Interstate 496
- Las Vegas—Interstate 215
- Lexington—KY-4
- Louisville—Interstate 264, Interstate 265
- Lubbock, Texas—Loop 289
- Memphis, Tennessee—Interstate 240 and Interstate 40 (Inner Beltway); Interstate 269 (Outer Beltway)
- Minneapolis/Saint Paul, Minnesota—Interstate 94, Interstate 494, and Interstate 694
- Nashville, Tennessee—Downtown Loop (Interstate 24, Interstate 40, and Interstate 65), Interstate 440, and Briley Parkway
- New York City—Interstate 287
- Norfolk, Virginia/Hampton Roads—Hampton Roads Beltway; Interstate 64 and Interstate 664
- Oklahoma City—Interstate 44, Kickapoo Turnpike, Interstate 40, Interstate 240, OK-152 and John Kilpatrick Turnpike
- Orlando, Florida—Florida State Road 417 and Florida State Road 429
- Philadelphia—Interstate 476, Interstate 276 and Interstate 95 around Philadelphia
- Philadelphia/Camden—Interstate 676 and Interstate 76 around Center City and Camden
- Philadelphia/Camden/Wilmington—Interstate 95 in PA/DE and Interstate 295
- Phoenix, Arizona—Arizona State Route 101 and Arizona State Route 202
- Pittsburgh—Interstate 79, the mainline Pennsylvania Turnpike and the Allegheny County belt system. (all de facto or, in the case of the latter, largely on surface streets) The Southern Beltway, which is currently under construction, will serve as a true beltway.
- Portland, Oregon—Interstate 405 and Interstate 205
- Providence, Rhode Island—Rhode Island Route 10 serves as a partial inner beltway, while Interstate 295 serves as a partial beltway to the west of Providence. Two different proposals (both since canceled) would have completed the outer I-295 beltway; the unbuilt sections were going to be designated Interstate 895.
- Raleigh, North Carolina—Interstate 540/North Carolina State Route 540 (Raleigh Outer Loop) and Interstate 440 (Raleigh Beltline)
- Richmond/Petersburg, Virginia—Interstate 295
- Sacramento—Interstate 80, U.S. Route 50, Capital City Freeway
- Saint Louis, Missouri—Interstate 255 and Interstate 270
- Salt Lake City—Interstate 215
- San Antonio—Downtown Circulator, Interstate 410, and Loop 1604
- San Diego—California State Route 54, California State Route 125, California State Route 52
- San Francisco Bay Area—Interstate 280 and Interstate 680
- Scranton, Pennsylvania—Interstate 81 and Interstate 476
- Toledo, Ohio—Interstate 475 (Ohio), Interstate 75, The Ohio Turnpike and Interstate 280

There are other U.S. superhighway beltway systems that consist of multiple routes that require multiple interchanges and thus do not provide true ring routes. Two designated examples are the Capital Beltway around Harrisburg, Pennsylvania using Interstate 81, Interstate 83, and Pennsylvania Route 581 and "The Bypass" around South Bend, Indiana using Interstate 80, Interstate 90, U.S. Route 31, and Indiana State Road 331.

=== Canada ===
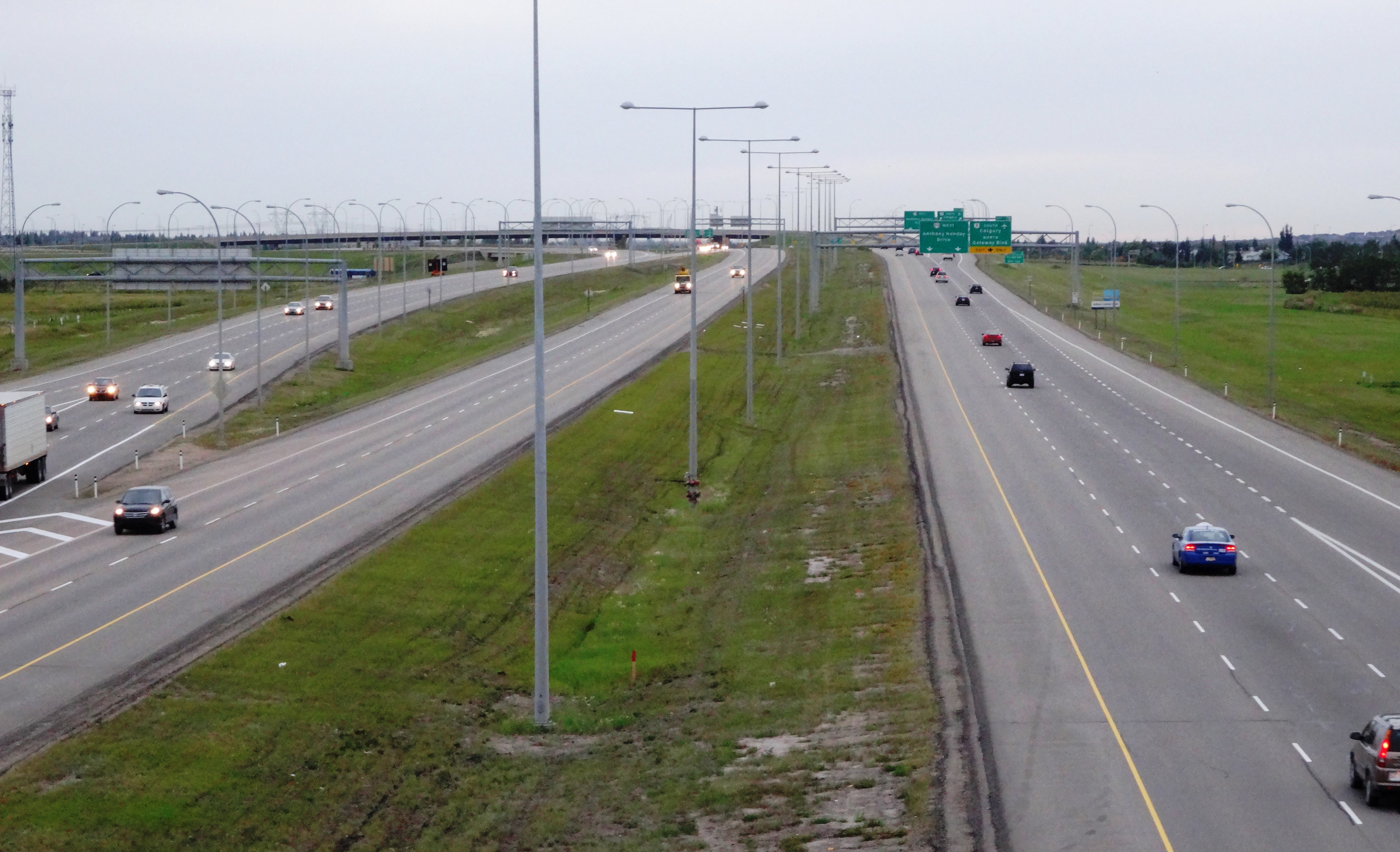
The Anthony Henday Drive ring road in Edmonton

Edmonton, Alberta, has two ring roads. The first is a loose conglomeration of four major arterial roads with an average distance of 6 kilometres (3.7 mi) from the downtown core. Yellowhead Trail forms the northern section, Wayne Gretzky Drive/75 Street forms the eastern section, Whitemud Drive forms the southern and longest section, and 170 Street forms the western and shortest section. Whitemud Drive is the only section that is a true controlled-access highway, while Yellowhead Trail and Wayne Gretzky Drive have interchanges and intersections and are therefore both limited-access roads. Yellowhead Trail is currently being upgraded to full freeway standards. 170 Street and 75 Street are merely large arterial roads with intersections only. The second and more prominent ring road is named Anthony Henday Drive; it circles the city at an average distance of 12 kilometres (7.5 mi) from the downtown core. It is a freeway for its entire 78-kilometre (48 mi) length, and was built to reduce inner-city traffic congestion, created a bypass of Yellowhead Trail, and has improved the movement of goods and services across Edmonton and the surrounding areas. It was completed in October 2016 as the first free-flowing orbital road in Canada.

Stoney Trail is a ring road that circles the city of Calgary, Alberta, for an entire length of 101-kilometre (63 mi).

Winnipeg, Manitoba, has a ring road which is called the Perimeter Highway. It is designated as Manitoba Highway 101 on the north, northwest and east sides and as Manitoba Highway 100 on the south and southwest sides. The majority of it is a four-lane divided expressway. It has a second ring road, planned since the 1950s and not yet completed, called the Suburban Beltway. It consists of several roads—Lagimodière Boulevard, Abinojii Mikanah, the Fort Garry Bridge, the Moray Bridge, William R Clement Parkway, Chief Peguis Trail and the Kildonan Bridge.

Saskatoon, Saskatchewan, has a ring road named Circle Drive. It is cosigned as Saskatchewan Highway 16 and Saskatchewan Highway 11 along the whole route since the 2013 opening of Circle Drive South.

Regina, Saskatchewan has a partial ring road that is named Ring Road; however, due to the city's urban growth since the road was originally constructed, it no longer functions as a true ring road and has instead come to be used partially for local arterial traffic. The Regina Bypass, a new partial ring road, has replaced it, although Ring Road must still be used in the northeast quadrant of the city.

Hamilton, Ontario, has the Lincoln M. Alexander Parkway, Highway 403 and the Red Hill Valley Parkway which form a ring on three sides.

Sudbury, Ontario, has a partial ring road consisting of the Southwest and Southeast Bypasses segment of Highway 17, and the Northwest Bypass segment of Highway 144. An unofficial northeast "bypass" route can also be completed on city arterial roads that largely bypass the urban core of the city, but are not fully controlled-access and must be shared with local traffic in the Nickel Centre and Rayside-Balfour districts of the city.

Dartmouth, Nova Scotia, has Nova Scotia Highway 111, a partial ring road which begins in the neighbourhood of Woodside in the Southeast and terminates at the A. Murray MacKay Bridge in the Northwest.

=== Europe ===
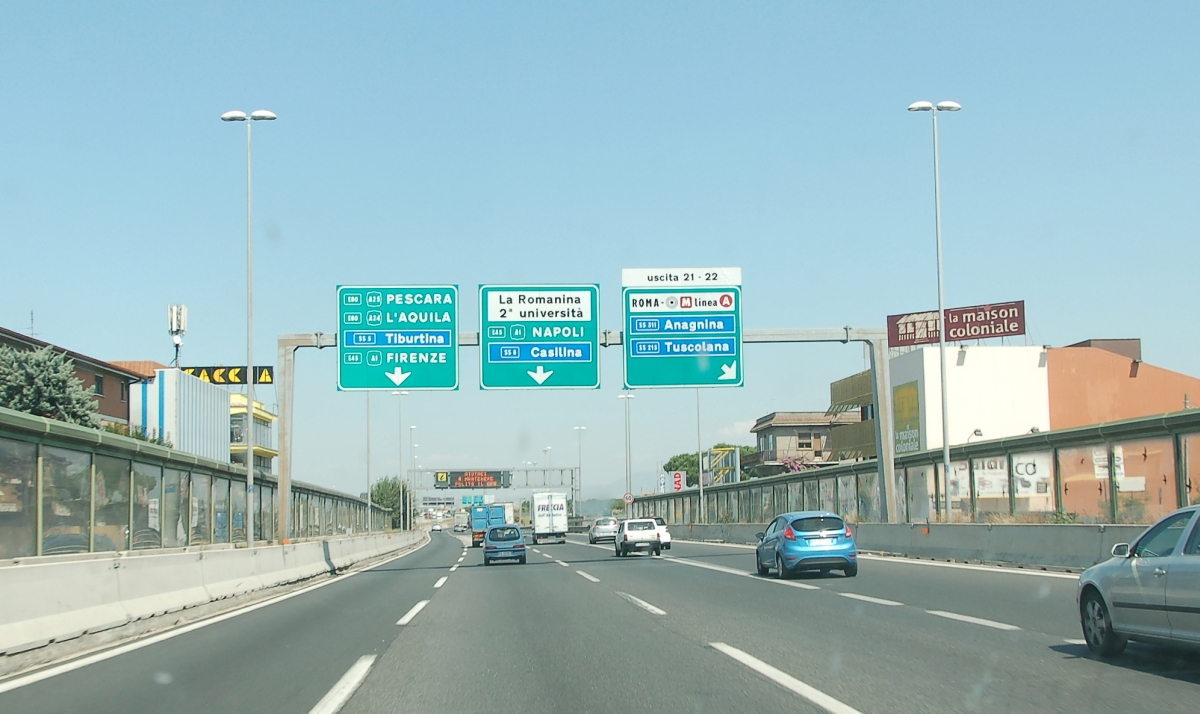
Grande Raccordo Anulare, the ring road of Rome, Italy

Most major cities in Europe are served by a ring road that circles either the inner core of their metropolitan areas or the outer borders of the city proper or both. In major transit hubs, such as the Île-de-France region surrounding Paris and the Frankfurt area, major national highways converge just outside city limits before forming one of several routes of an urban network of roads circling the city. Unlike in the United States, route numbering is not a challenge on European ring roads as routes merge to form the single designated road. However, exit and road junction access can be challenging due to the complexity of other routes branching from or into the ring road.

One of the most renowned ring roads is the Vienna Ring Road (Ringstraße), a grand boulevard constructed in the mid-19th century and filled with representative buildings. Due to its unique architectural beauty and history, it has also been called the "Lord of the ring roads", and is declared by UNESCO as part of Vienna's World Heritage Site.

Major European cities that are served by a ring road or ring road system:

- Amsterdam, Netherlands – A10 motorway
- Antwerp, Belgium – R1
- Athens, Greece – Attiki Odos (Motorway A6)
- Barcelona, Spain – Ronda de Dalt and Ronda Litoral (inner city), B30 and B40 (metropolitan region)
- Belgrade, Serbia – Belgrade bypass
- Berlin, Germany – Bundesautobahn 100 (inner city), Bundesautobahn 111 (city proper), Bundesautobahn 10 (inner metropolitan region)
- Birmingham, England – A4400 (Birmingham Queensway); A4540 (The Middleway); A4040 (Birmingham Outer Circle), Birmingham orbital motorway (parts of M42, M6 and M5 motorways, inner metropolitan region)
- Bochum, Germany - Nordring, Ostring, Südring, Westring (inner city), Bochumer Außenring (former L705, now west- and southpart are part of Bundesautobahn 448, city proper), Bochumer Autobahnring (Bundesautobahn 40, Bundesautobahn 43 and Bundesautobahn 448, inner metropolitan region)
- Bologna, Italy – Tangenziale di Bologna (periphery half-ring road) and Viali di Circonvallazione (full and inner ring road: around the city center)
- Bordeaux, France – Rocade de Bordeaux
- Bratislava, Slovakia – D4 motorway (Bratislavsky okruch)
- Brussels, Belgium – Petite ceinture/Kleine ring (inner city), R22 (outer districts), Brussels Ring (city proper)
- Bucharest, Romania – A0 Motorway
- Budapest, Hungary – M0
- Caen, France – Périphérique de Caen
- Catania, Italy – Tangenziale di Catania
- Charleroi, Belgium – R9 (inner city), R3 (inner metropolitan region)
- Cologne, Germany – Cologne Ring (inner city), Cologne Beltway (metropolitan region)
- Constanța, Romania – A4 motorway (Romania)
- Copenhagen, Denmark – Ring 2, Ring 3, Ring 4, Motorring 3 and Motorring 4
- Coventry, England – A4053 Coventry ring road
- Dortmund, Germany - Wallring (inner city), Dortmund Beltway (Bundesautobahn 2, Bundesautobahn 1 and Bundesautobahn 45; metropolitan region)
- Dublin, Ireland – M50 motorway
- Frankfurt, Germany – Bundesautobahn 66 and Bundesautobahn 661 (city proper), Frankfurter Kreuz system (inner metropolitan region)
- Ghent, Belgium – R4
- Glasgow, Scotland – Glasgow Inner Ring Road (inner city)
- Hamburg, Germany – Inner Ring (inner city)
- Helsinki, Finland – Ring I, Ring II, Ring III
- Herning, Denmark – Messemotorvejen, Messemotorvejens forlængelse, Sindingvej, Midtjyske Motorvej
- Istanbul, Turkey - Otoyol 1, Otoyol 2
- Kharkiv, Ukraine – Kharkiv Ring Road
- Kyiv, Ukraine – Small Ring Road (inner city), Kiltseva Road
- Košice, Slovakia – Ring road 1 (MO 1) Ring road 2 (MO 2)I/16 and I/20
- Leeds, England – Leeds Inner Ring Road (inner city), Leeds Outer Ring Road (suburbs)
- Leipzig, Germany – Inner City Ring Road (Leipzig) (inner city), Mitteldeutsche Schleife (double ring road of the Halle-Leipzig metropolitan region)
- London, England – London Inner Ring Road (inner city), North Circular Road and South Circular Road (inner suburbs), M25 motorway (metropolitan region)
- Lisbon, Portugal – 2ª Circular (Inner City), IC17-CRIL (City Proper), IC18/A9-CREL (Metropolitan Region)
- Lyon, France – A7 autoroute and A46 autoroute (city proper)
- Ljubljana, Slovenia – Ljubljana Ring Road
- Madrid, Spain – M-30 (inner city), M-40 (inner metropolitan region), M-50 (outer metropolitan region, incomplete)
- Malmö, Sweden – Inre ringvägen (inner city), E6 & E20 (outer city city)
- Manchester, England – Manchester Inner Ring Road (inner city), M60 motorway (metropolitan region)
- Milan, Italy – Autostrada A4, Autostrada A50 (West), Autostrada A51 (East), Autostrada A52 (North) and Autostrada A58 (Outer Eastern) bypass roads (it is the largest system of ring roads around a city in Italy, for a total length greater than 100 kilometres (62 mi)), Circolare Esterna (periphery ring road), Circonvallazione (ring road around the centre), Cerchia Interna (ring road in the city centre)
- Minsk, Belarus – M9
- Moscow, Russia – Boulevard Ring, Garden Ring, Third Ring Road, Moscow Ring Road (opened in 1961)
- Munich, Germany – Altstadtring (inner city), Bundesstraße 2 R (middle ring), Bundesautobahn 99 (inner metropolitan region)
- Naples, Italy – Tangenziale di Napoli
- Oslo, Norway – Ring 1 (city centre), Ring 2 (middle ring) and Ring 3 (city proper)
- Oxford, England – Oxford Ring Road
- Paris, France – Boulevard Périphérique (city proper), A86 autoroute (inner metropolitan region), Francilienne (tertiary ring road), Grand contournement de Paris (metropolitan region)
- Padua, Italy – GRAP
- Palma de Mallorca, Spain – Ma-20 (Vía de Cintura)
- Prague, Czech Republic – outer – D0 and inner Městský okruh
- Poznań, Poland – outer ring: expressway S11, motorway A2 (concurrent with S5 and S11), expressway S5; inner rings: 1st – partially completed, 2nd – completed, partially concurrent with national road 92 and voivodeship roads 196 and 433, 3rd – planned
- Reggio Calabria, Italy – Tangenziale di Reggio Calabria
- Rennes, France – Rocade de Rennes
- Rome, Italy – Grande Raccordo Anulare
- Sofia, Bulgaria – Sofia Ring Road
- Saint Petersburg, Russia – Saint Petersburg Ring Road
- Stockholm, Sweden – Nörra Länken, Essingeleden, Södra Länken (city proper) and E20 (outer city, under completion).
- Skopje, North Macedonia – A2 motorway (North Macedonia) (part of E65)
- Tallinn, Estonia – Estonian national road 11
- Tampere, Finland – Tampere Ring Road
- Toulouse, France – Périphérique de Toulouse
- Thessaloniki, Greece – Thessaloniki Inner Ring Road
- Turin, Italy – Tangenziale di Torino
- Venice, Italy – Tangenziale di Venezia
- Vienna, Austria – Vienna Ring Road (inner city), Vienna Beltway (outer districts)
- Vigo, Spain – VG-20 (Vigo Ring Road)
- Warsaw, Poland – Expressway S2, Expressway S7, Expressway S8, Expressway S17 (planned stretch)
- Wrocław, Poland – Outer ring: Autostrada A4, Autostrada A8, Expressway S8, Wroclaw Eastern Bypass (in construction). Inner ring: National road 5, National road 94
- Zagreb, Croatia – Zagreb bypass
- Zillina, Slovakia – I/60 Mestky okruch

In Iceland, there is a 1,332 km ring road, called the ring road (or Route 1), around most of the island (excluding only the remote Westfjords). Most of the country's settlements are on or near this road.

==== Some maps of ring roads in Europe ====
Antwerp, Belgium

Berlin, Germany

Bologna, Italy

Bordeaux, France

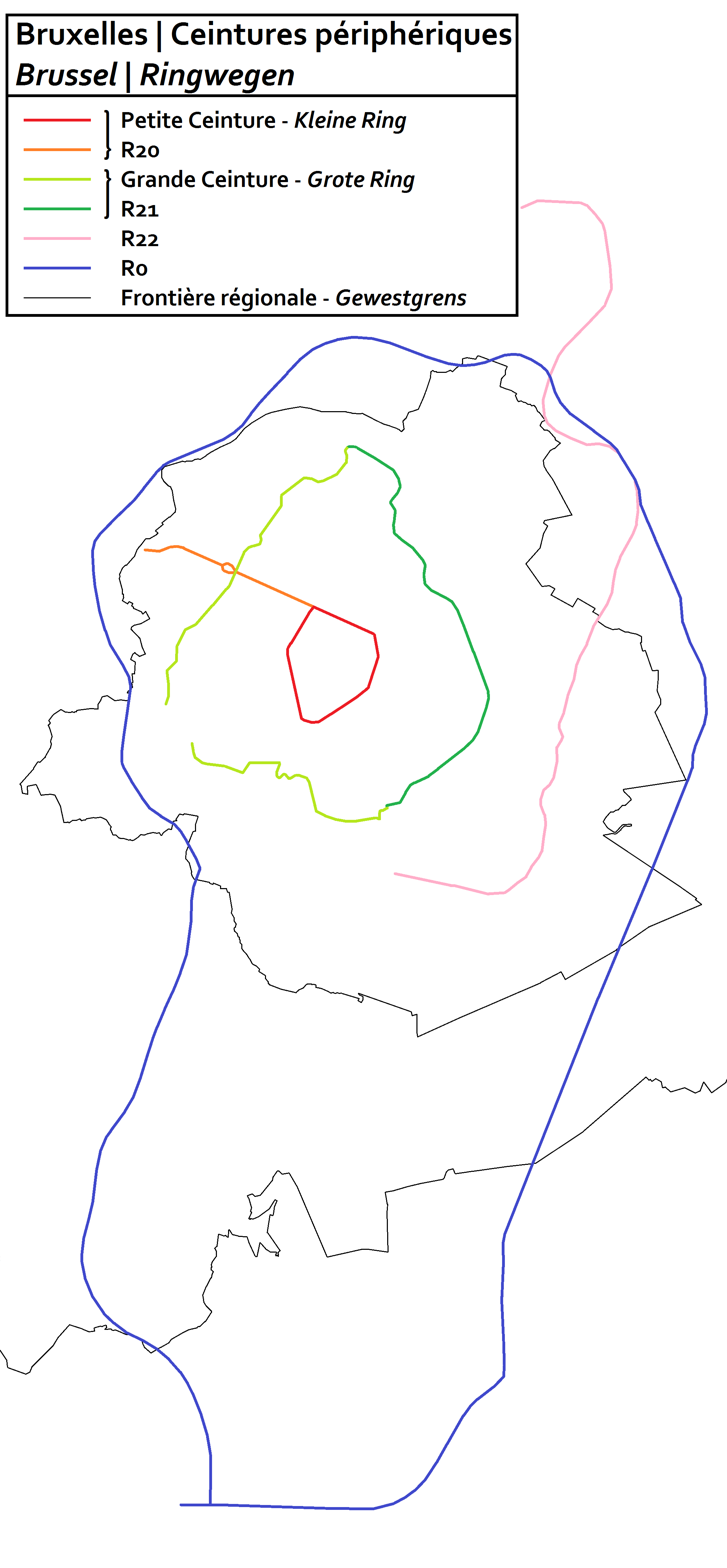
Brussels, Belgium

Bucharest, Romania

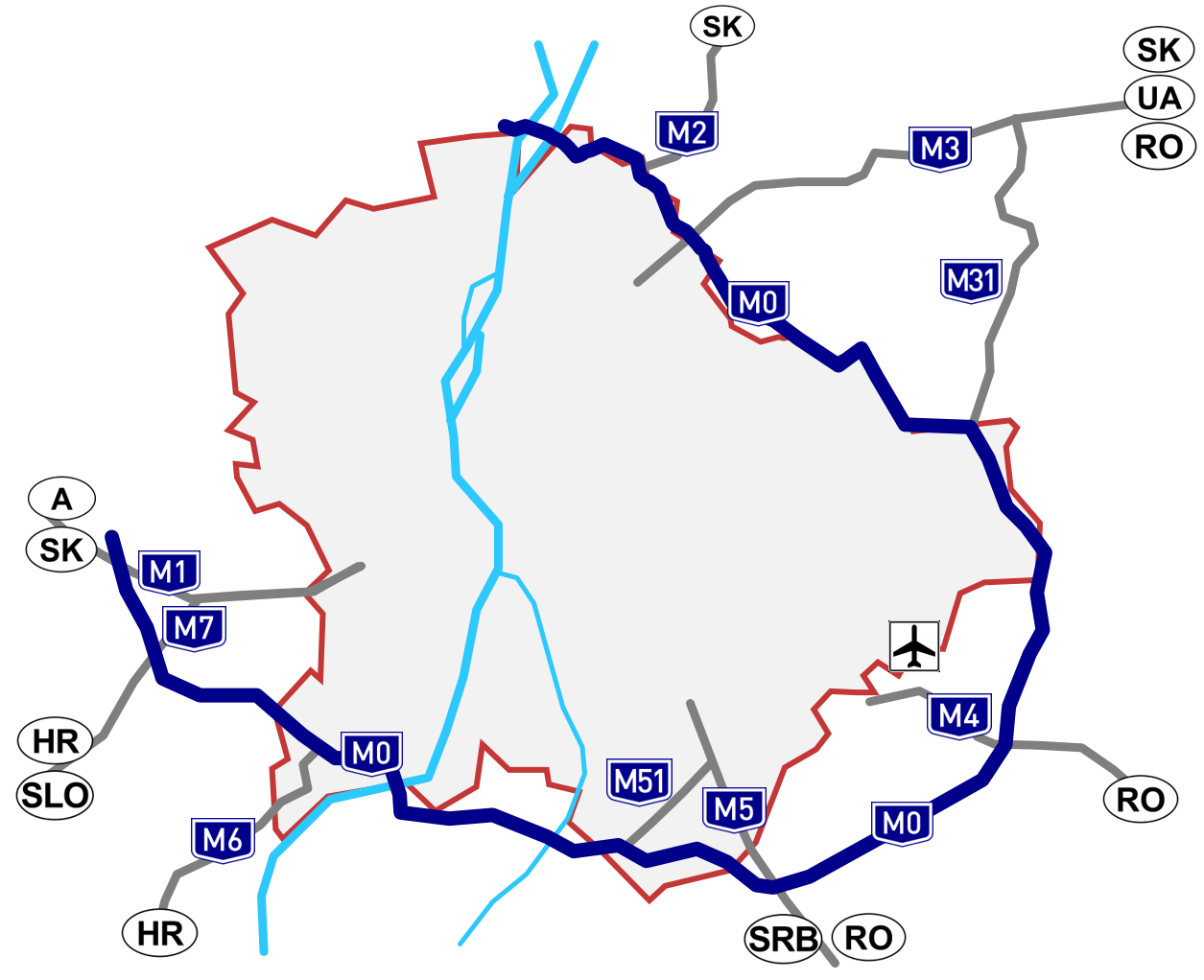
Budapest, Hungary

Caen, France

Catania, Italy

Charleroi, Belgium

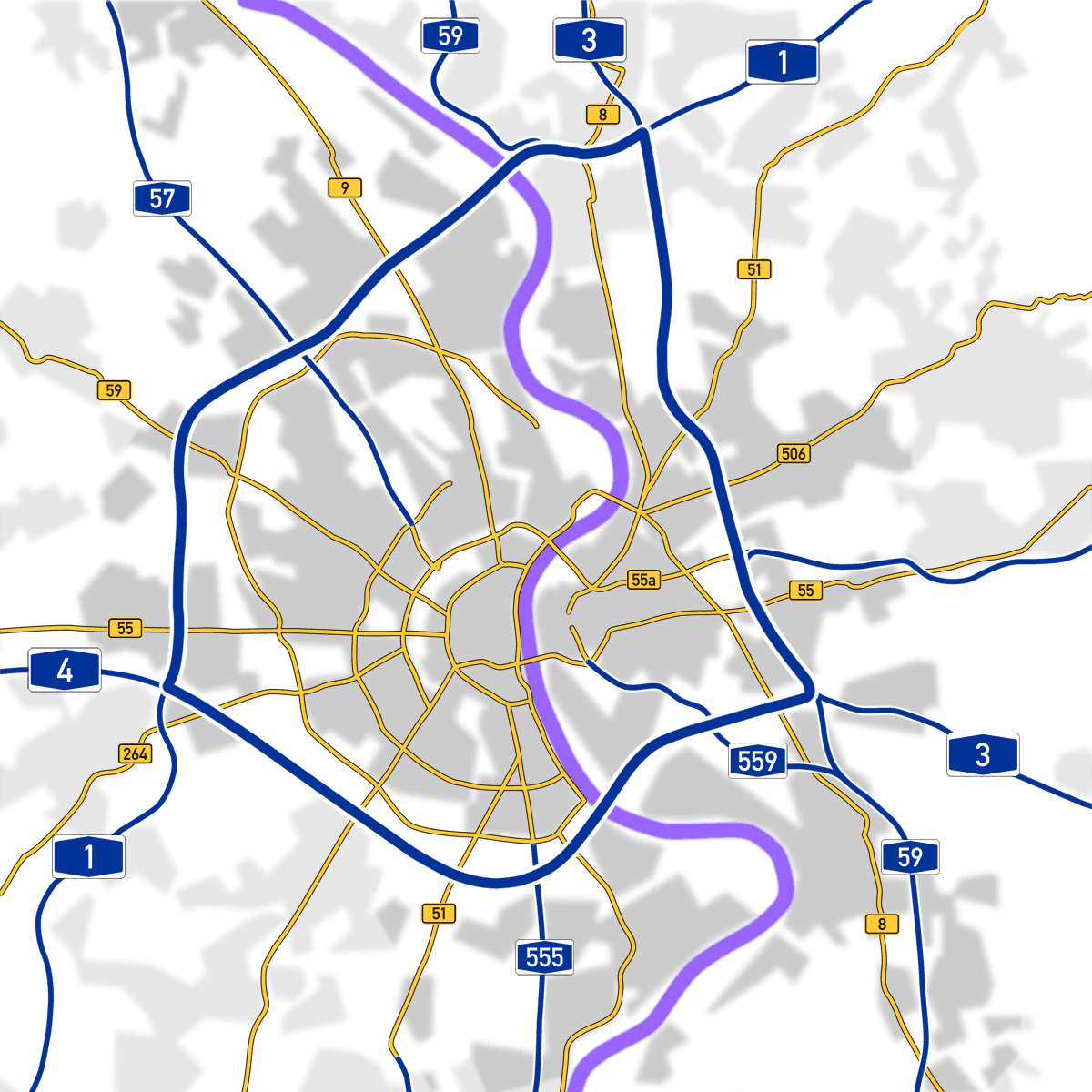
Cologne, Germany

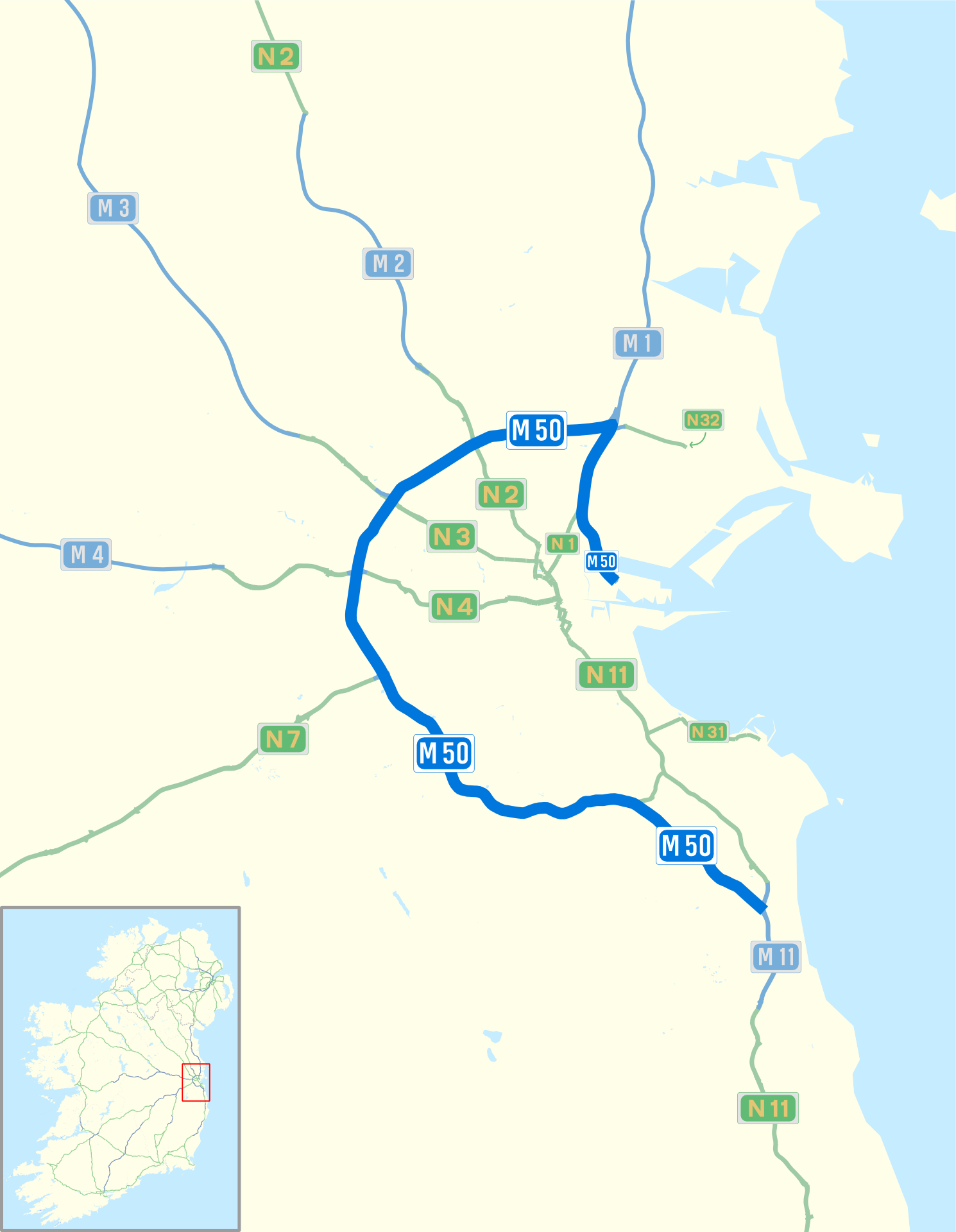
Dublin, Ireland

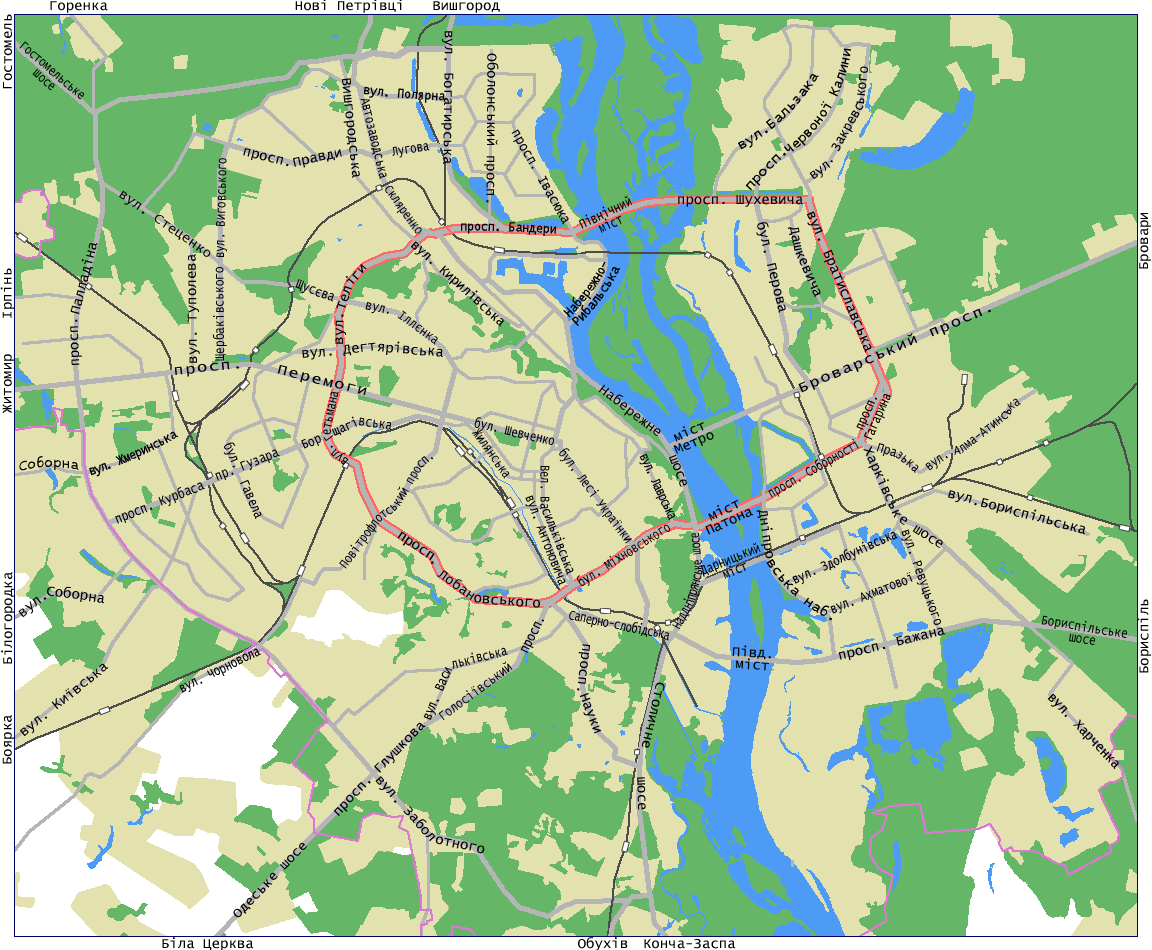
Kyiv, Ukraine

Ljubljana, Slovenia

Lyon, France

Madrid, Spain (Inner city)

Madrid, Spain (Inner metropolitan region)

Madrid, Spain

Milan, Italy

Moscow, Russia

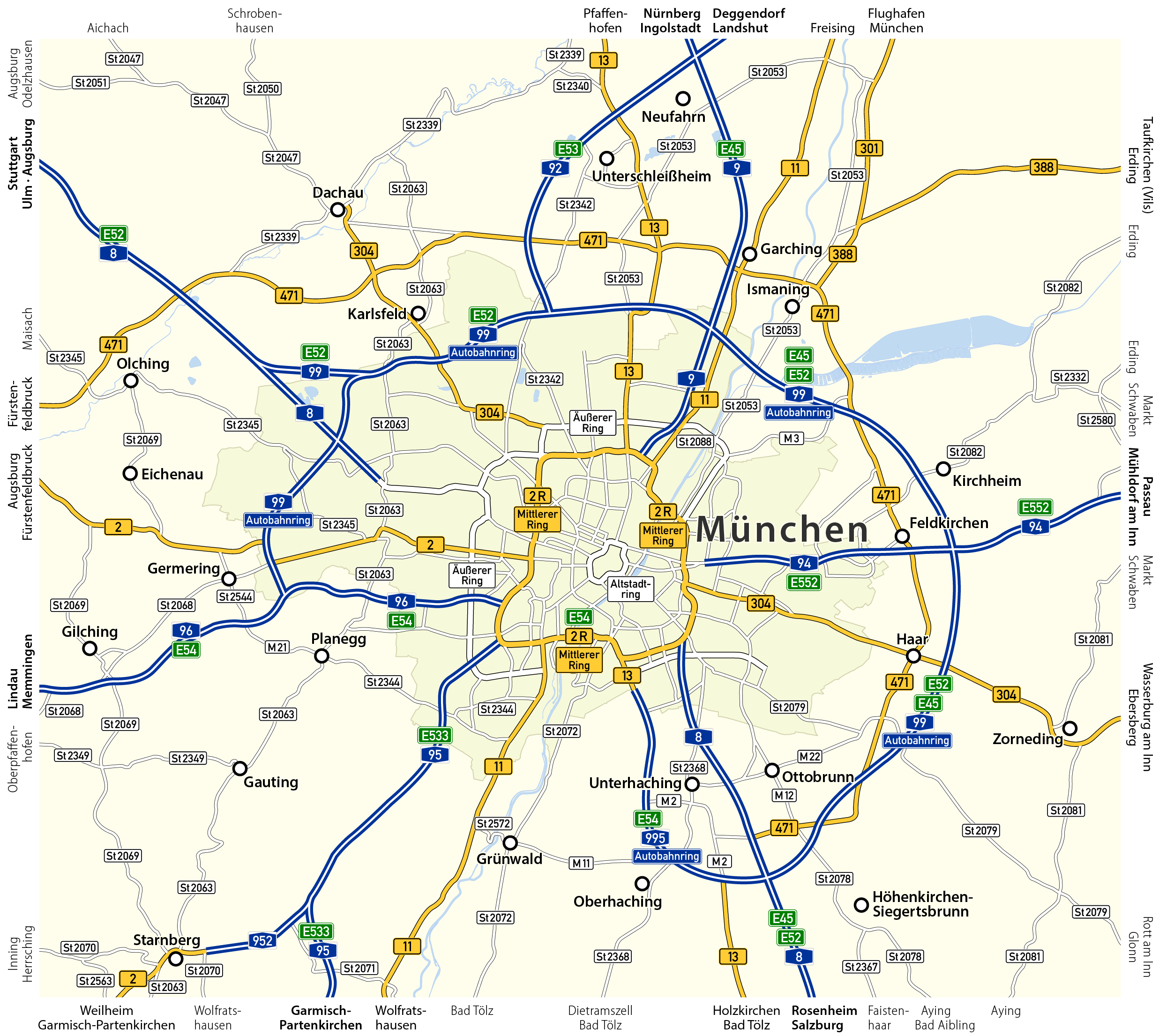
Munich, Germany

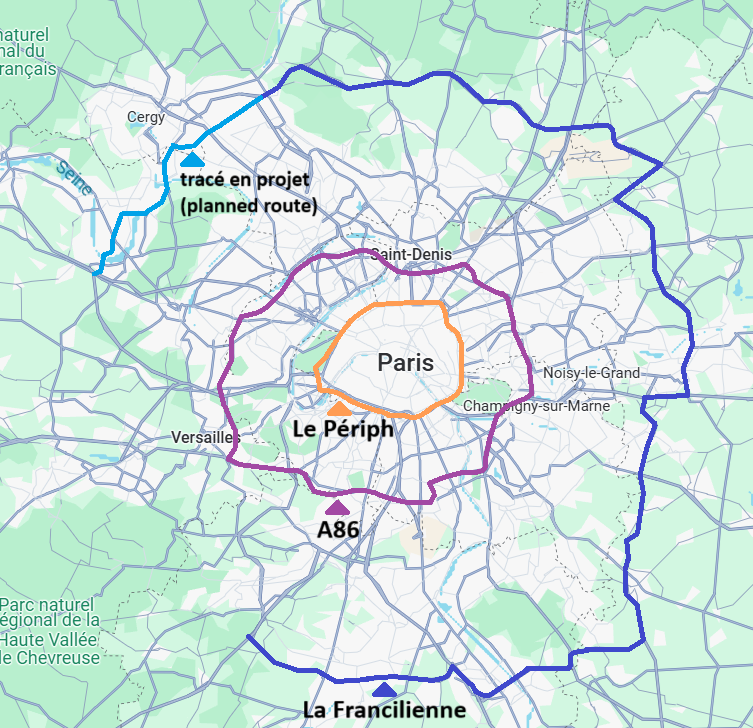
Paris, France

Rome, Italy

Sofia, Bulgaria

Toulouse, France

Turin, Italy

Venice, Italy

Zagreb, Croatia

Istanbul, Turkey

=== Asia-Pacific ===
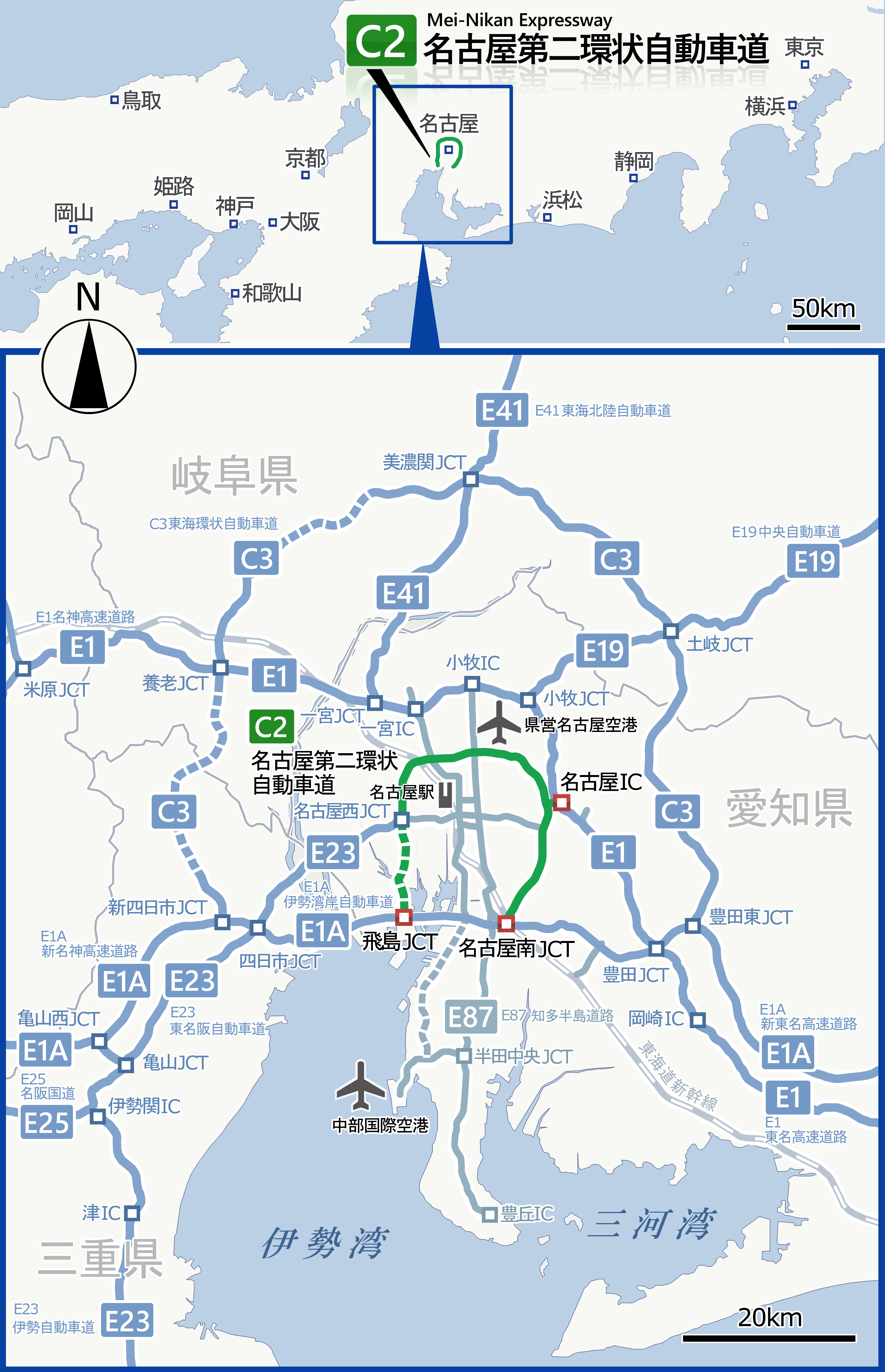
Chūkyō metropolitan area(Nagoya)

Major cities that are served by a ring road or ring road system:

- Australia: Sydney (Sydney Orbital Network), Canberra, Adelaide, Brisbane, Perth and Melbourne have ring roads.
- Afghanistan, Ring Road, a 2200 km long road circulating inside the country, and connects most of Afghanistan's major cities, such as Kabul, Ghazni, Kandahar, Herat and Mazar-i-Sharif.
- Ahmedabad, India – Sardar Patel Ring Road
- Ankara, Turkey – Otoyol 20
- Bandung, Indonesia – Padaleunyi Toll Road, Soekarno-Hatta Road
- Bangkok, Thailand – Ratchadaphisek Road (Inner Ring Road) and Kanchanaphisek Road (Outer Ring Road)
- Beijing, China – ring roads encircling the city.
- Bengaluru, India - Outer Ring Road, Peripheral Ring Road, Satellite Town Ring Road
- Chennai, India- Inner Ring Road, Outer Ring Road Chennai, Peripheral Ring Road
- Chiang Mai, Thailand – Chiang Mai Outer Ring Road (National Highway 121)
- Christchurch, New Zealand – Christchurch Ring Road includes parts of State Highways 1, 74, and 76. The "Four Avenues" (Bealey Avenue, Fitzgerald Avenue, Moorhouse Avenue, and Deans Avenue) serve as an inner ring around the central city.
- Delhi, India – Inner Ring Road, Delhi, Outer Ring Road, Delhi, Urban Extension Road-II (half completed), and the Peripheral Expressway consisting of two halves, the Western Peripheral Expressway and the Eastern Peripheral Expressway.
- Erbil, Iraq – Four ring roads circulating through/around the city.
- Fukuoka, Japan – Fukuoka Expressway Circular Route
- Gajwel, India - Gajwel Outer Ring Road
- Gaziantep, Turkey - Otoyol 54
- George Town, Malaysia – George Town Inner Ring Road, Penang Middle Ring Road
- Guntur, India - Inner Ring Road, Guntur
- Hanoi, Vietnam – Ringway 3
- Ho Chi Minh City, Vietnam – Ringway 3
- Hawaii Island, Hawaii – Hawaii Belt Road
- Hong Kong, Hong Kong – Route 9 (New Territories Circular Road)
- Hyderabad, India – Outer Ring Road, Hyderabad, Regional Ring Road, Hyderabad.
- Izmir, Turkey - Otoyol 30
- Jaipur, India - Ring Road, Jaipur
- Jakarta, Indonesia – Jakarta Inner Ring Road, Jakarta Outer Ring Road, Jakarta Outer Ring Road 2
- Kanpur, India - Outer Ring Road, Kanpur
- Kalaburagi, India – Kalaburagi Ring Road
- Kathmandu, Nepal – Kathmandu Ringroad
- Konya, Turkey - Konya Beltway
- Kuala Lumpur, Malaysia – Kuala Lumpur Inner Ring Road, Kuala Lumpur Middle Ring Road 1, Kuala Lumpur Middle Ring Road 2, Kuala Lumpur Outer Ring Road
- Lahore, Pakistan – Lahore Ring Road
- Lucknow, India - Lucknow Outer Ring Road (NH 230)
- Manila, Philippines – Circumferential Road 1, Circumferential Road 2, Circumferential Road 3, EDSA, Circumferential Road 5, Circumferential Road 6
- Medina, Saudi Arabia – King Faisal Road (1st Ring Road) and King Abdullah Road (2nd Ring Road)
- Mysuru, India – Outer Ring Road
- Nagoya, Japan – C1 Inner Ring Route Expressway, C2 Second Ring Route Expressway, C3 Third Ring Route Expressway, Japan National Route 302, Nagoya Municipal Road Nagoya Inner Ring
- Nakhon Ratchasima, Thailand – Nakhon Ratchasima Ring Route (National Highway 290)
- Nagpur, Maharashtra, India - Inner Ring Road, Outer Ring Road
- Osaka, Japan – Loop Route
- Peshawar, Pakistan – Peshawar Ring Road
- Pune, India - Inner Ring Road, Outer Ring Road
- Ranchi, India – Ranchi Ring Road
- Rawalpindi/Islamabad, Pakistan = Rawalpindi Ring Road (under construction)
- Riyadh, Saudi Arabia – Riyadh Ring Road
- Sendai, Japan – Gurutto Sendai
- Seoul, South Korea – Capital Region First Ring Expressway
- Shanghai, China – Inner Ring Road, Middle Ring Road, S20 Outer Ring Expressway, G1501 Shanghai Ring Expressway
- Singapore, Singapore – Outer Ring Road System
- Suphan Buri, Thailand – Suphan Buri Ring Route (National Highway 357)
- Tianjin, China – Inner, Middle and Outer Ring Roads
- Tokyo, Japan – C1 Inner Circular Expressway, C2 Central Circular Expressway, C3 Gaikan Expressway, C4 Ken-Ō Expressway, CA Tokyo Bay Aqua-Line/B Bayshore Route, Yokohama Ring Expressway, Japan National Route 16, Japan National Route 298, Japan National Route 357, Japan National Route 468

=== Africa ===
- Addis Ababa, Ethiopia – Addis Ababa Ring Road
- Bloemfontein, South Africa – Bloemfontein Ring Road
- Cairo, Egypt – Ring Road (Cairo)
- Durban, South Africa – Durban Outer Ring Road
- Johannesburg, South Africa – Johannesburg Ring Road
- Polokwane, South Africa – Polokwane Ring Road
- Pretoria, South Africa – Pretoria Ring Road

== See also ==
- Circumferential Highway
- Downtown circulator
- Link road
- List of ring roads
- Circle route, a public transport route forming a circle
