= Pune Ring Road =

Pune Ring Road may refer to:

- Inner Ring Road, Pune
- Outer Ring Road, Pune
