= VG-20 =

Urban motorway in Spain

Autovía VG-20

Route information
- Length: 13 km (8.1 mi)

Major junctions
- Orbital around Vigo
- From: Vigo–Peinador Airport
- To: Autopista AP-9

Location
- Country: Spain
- Autonomous community: Galicia
- Province: Pontevedra

Highway system
- Highways in Spain; Autopistas and autovías; National Roads

The VG-20 is a Spain dual carriageway, essentially a free dual-lane highway. It serves as the second bypass (Segundo Cinturón) road circling Vigo in the province of Pontevedra.

== Road ==
VG-20 loops around the south of Vigo, connecting the Bouzas–Castrelos segment (the First Belt) to the AP‑9 motorway at Rebullón, forming a southern ring road around the city.

It is an autovía, meaning it is toll‑free and designed for high‑capacity urban traffic. Maximum speed is 120 km/h, with multiple junctions. Autopistas, by contrast, are tolled roads built to higher access standards.

== History ==
Construction began around 2001 as part of an extension of the AP‑9 toward Tui. The VG‑20 was fully operational by November 2005, after ~€122 million in investment by Spain’s Ministry of Transport.

As of 2025, the Porto viaduct, a major span (~347 m) on the VG‑20, experienced structural damage. The Spanish government allocated €6.5 million for reinforcement, barrier replacement, and deck resurfacing on a section between km 9.65 and 10.0.

Additional resurfacing contracts worth approximately €2.1 million brought total investment in VG‑20 and adjacent A‑55 arterial roads to nearly €4.6M.
