= Sardar Patel Ring Road =

Orbital road in Ahmedabad, India

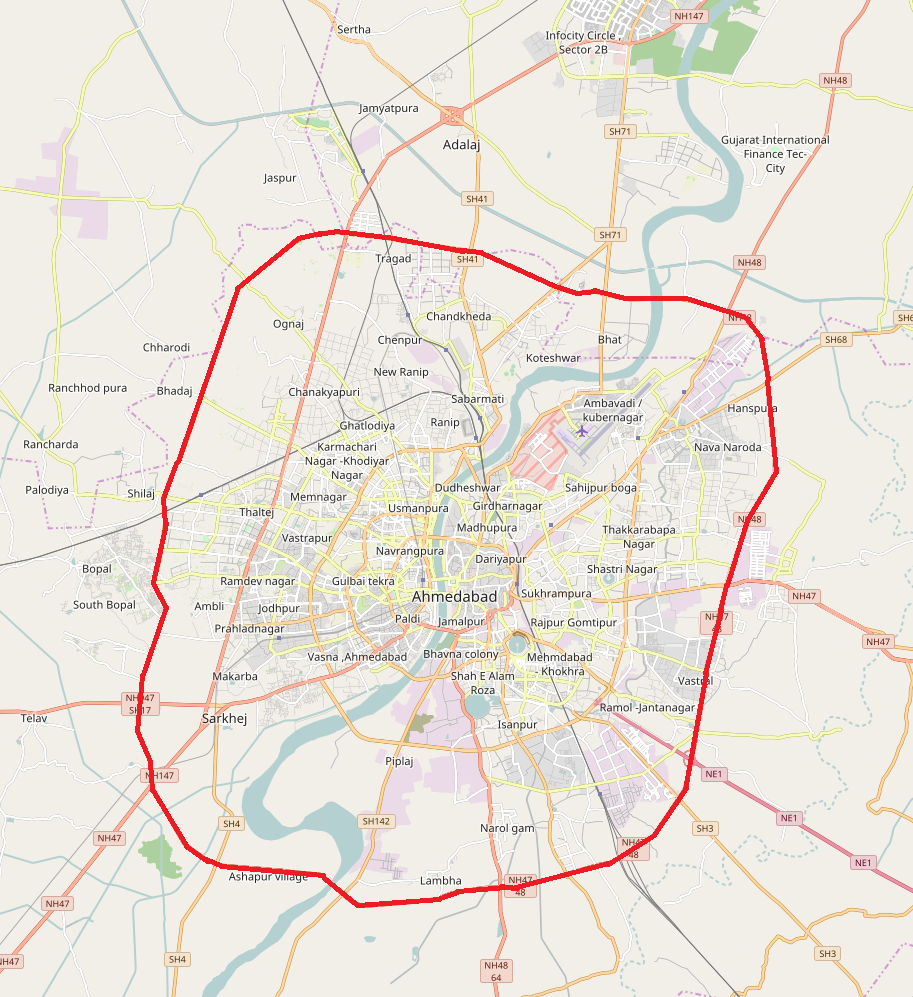

Route information
- Maintained by Ahmedabad Urban Development Authority
- Length: 76 km (47 mi)
- History: Opened in 2004

Major junctions
- Sarkhej, Narol, Naroda, Bopal, Odhav, Nikol, Vastral, Ramol, Zundal, Jashodanagar, Hathijan, Vatwa

Location
- Country: India
- State: Gujarat
- Major cities: Ahmedabad

Highway system
- Roads in India; Expressways; National; State; Asian; State Highways in Gujarat

The Sardar Patel Ring Road is a 76 km long ring road encircling the city of Ahmedabad, Gujarat, India. It is a toll road built by the Ahmedabad Urban Development Authority (AUDA). Built at a cost of ₹355 crore (₹3.55 billion), it was opened in 2004.

== Route ==
It meets the Ahmedabad Vadodara Expressway at one point and crosses the Sabarmati River and the Mumbai-Delhi National Highway twice.

The AUDA demarcated a region of 1 km around the road as a residential affordable housing zone in an attempt to improve affordable housing.

== Toll ==
The road is tolled with several toll plazas at Narol, Ramol, Ranasan and other locations.

== Public transport ==
The Gujarat State Road Transport Corporation runs a circular bus service along the ring road from Sarkhej on an hourly basis in both directions.

The Shivranjani-Bopal line of the Ahmedabad Janmarg crosses the ring road at Ghuma.
