= High-capacity mass transit route, Pune =

Planned road in Pune, India

The High-capacity mass transit route, Pune is a ring road proposed by the Pune Municipal Corporation for city of Pune. Such a road was proposed way back in the late 1970s. This will pass through the suburbs of Bopodi, Aundh, Shivajinagar, Erandawane, Kothrud, Duttawadi, Parvati, Bibewadi, Wanawadi, Salasburry Park, Hadapsar, Mundhwa, Kalyaninagar, Yerawada and Kalas comprising an expected total length of 35.96 kilometres having 34 junctions with existing roads of the city which includes 17 up ramps and 16 down ramps. Average speed on this road is expected to be 21 kmph. The primary goal is to reduce traffic congestion along with air & noise pollution. A Bus Rapid Transit system was proposed on this route but was later replaced by a neo metro project.

== See also ==
- Inner Ring Road, Pune
- Outer Ring Road, Pune
- List of roads in Pune
