= Pathargaon =

Village in Maharashtra

- Village
- Location in Maharashtra, India Pathargaon (India)
- Coordinates: 18.7563562°N 73.5278328°E
- Country: India
- State: Maharashtra
- District: Pune
- Tehsil: Mawal

Government
  - Type: Panchayati Raj
  - Body: Gram panchayat

Area
  - Total: 144 ha (360 acres)

Population (2011)
  - Total: 537
  - Density: 373/km^{2} (966/sq mi)
- Sex ratio 279 / 258 ♂/♀

Languages
  - Official: Marathi
  - Other spoken: Hindi
- Time zone: UTC+5:30 (IST)
- Pin code: 410405
- Telephone code: 02114
- ISO 3166 code: IN-MH
- Vehicle registration: MH-14
- Website: pune.nic.in

Pathargaon is a village in India, situated in Mawal taluka of Pune district in the state of Maharashtra. It encompasses an area of 144 ha (356 acres).

== Administration ==
The village is administrated by a sarpanch, an elected representative who leads a gram panchayat. At the time of the 2011 Census of India, the gram panchayat governed three villages and was based at Taje.

== Demographics ==
At the 2011 census, the village comprised 97 households. The population of 537 was split between 279 males and 258 females.

== Air travel connectivity ==
The closest airport to the village is Pune Airport.

== See also ==
- List of villages in Mawal taluka
