= Wadachiwadi =

Village in Maharashtra

- village
- Location in Maharashtra, India Wadachiwadi (India)
- Country: India
- State: Maharashtra
- District: Solapur district

Languages
  - Official: Marathi
- Time zone: UTC+5:30 (IST)

Wadachiwadi is a village in the Karmala taluka of Solapur district in Maharashtra state, India.

== Demographics ==
Covering 280 hectares (690 acres) and comprising 143 households at the time of the 2011 census of India, Wadachiwadi had a population of 679. There were 365 males and 314 females, with 83 people being aged six or younger.
