= Bundesautobahn 448 =

Federal motorway in Germany

A 448
- Bundesautobahn 448

Route information
- Length: 19 km (12 mi)

Major junctions
- West end: Autobahndreieck Bochum-West
- East end: Autobahnkreuz Dortmund/Witten

Location
- Country: Germany
- States: North Rhine-Westphalia

Highway system
- Roads in Germany; Autobahns; List; Federal; List; State; E-roads

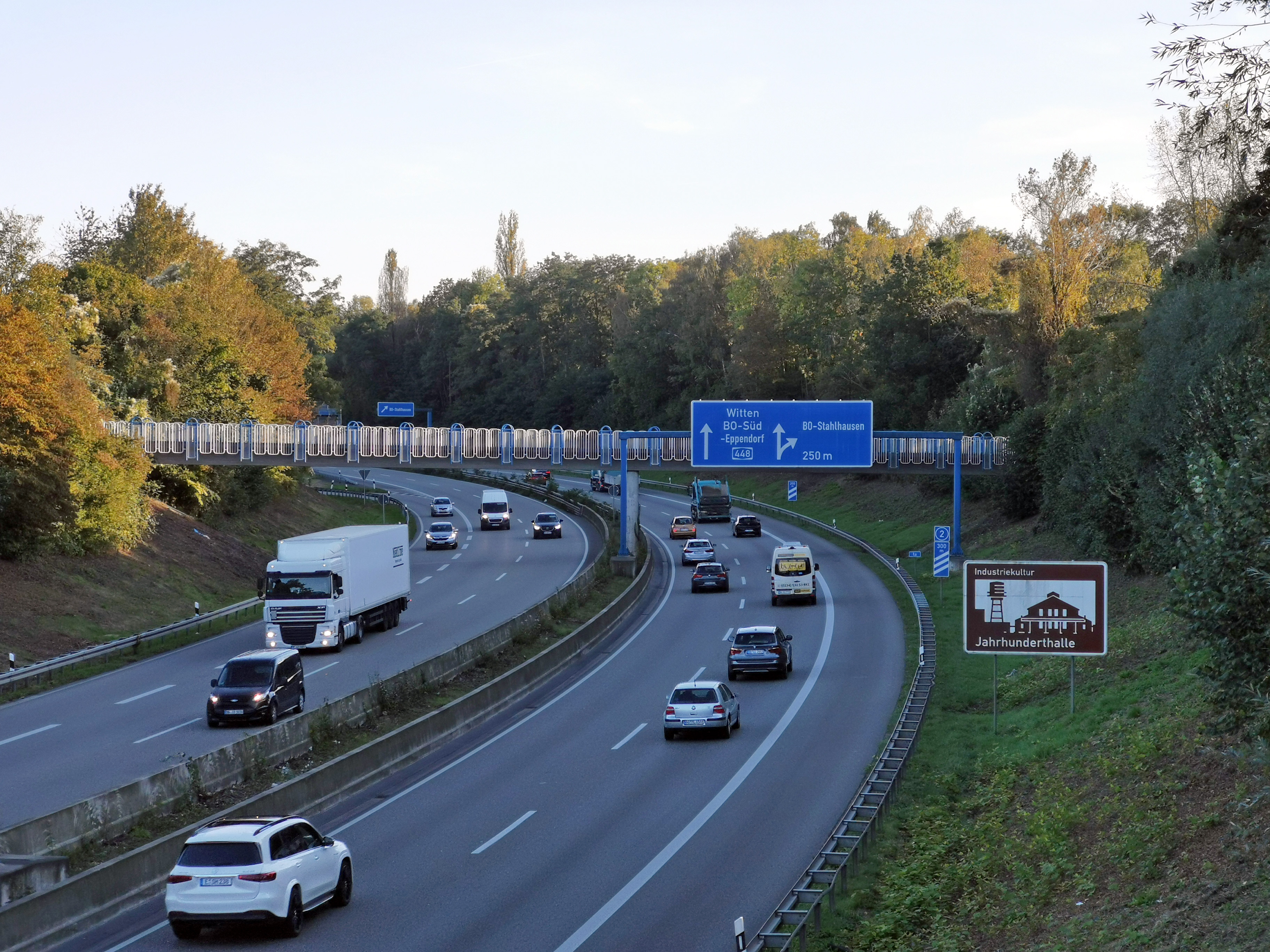
A448 in Bochum

Bundesautobahn 448 is an autobahn in the Ruhr. It connects the A40 in the west of Bochum with the section of the former A44 (also run as BAB 448 since 1 January 2017) in the east of Bochum in the so-called "Bochum solution" and relieve the parallel A40.

== History ==
The majority of A448 was created by renumbering of Bochum's highway ring, constructed in stages from the 1960s to the 1980s, and the Bochum to Dortmund section of A44. It required the demolition of housing, including the Heusnerviertel district, occupied by squatters. The missing link between the two, the so-called Opelspange, was in planning for decades, started construction 2012 and finally opened in 2021, nearly six years after the namesake OPEL assembly plant shut down. Completing this missing stretch of highway involved rerouting the primary direction of travel to take the new link, with the remaining section of the highway ring now required to take on- and off-ramps.

In 2015, the new Bochum-West junction opened at the western end of what would later become A448, enabling a direct connection to A40. Prior to this, the Ring ended just short of the A40, forcing drivers to use regular surface streets for a short distance to switch between the two highways.
