= Bhugaon =

Village in Maharashtra

- village
- Location in Maharashtra Bhugaon (India)
- Coordinates: 18.501284°N 73.750161°E
- Country: India
- State: Maharashtra
- District: Pune

Bhugaon is a village in Pune, India that is located in the outskirts of the city. Despite it being located in the outskirts, it is a wild green corridor. It is connected well to Bavdhan and Kothrud because of its close proximity to Chandani Chowk. In recent years, Bhugaon has seen rapid urbanization due to the booming IT sector in Pune.

There are 120 adivasis who attend Bhugaon Gram Panchayat meetings and are making a FRA Act 2006 Community Forest Rights dawah to the Hanuman-Ferguson College Tekdi FRC.

== Transport ==
Buses of PMPML go to various areas such as Pirangut, Mulshi, Temghar, Ghotawade, Marketyard, Paud, Kothrud, Swargate, Deccan and Pune Station. They pass via Bhugaon.
