= Pimpaloli =

Village in Maharashtra

- Village
- Location in Maharashtra, India Pimpaloli (India)
- Coordinates: 18.4884697°N 73.3174502°E
- Country: India
- State: Maharashtra
- District: Pune
- Tehsil: Mawal

Government
  - Type: Panchayati Raj
  - Body: Gram panchayat

Area
  - Total: 453 ha (1,120 acres)

Population (2011)
  - Total: 1,063
  - Density: 235/km^{2} (608/sq mi)
- Sex ratio 540/523 ♂/♀

Languages
  - Official: Marathi
  - Other spoken: Hindi
- Time zone: UTC+5:30 (IST)
- Pin code: 410405
- Telephone code: 02114
- ISO 3166 code: IN-MH
- Vehicle registration: MH-14
- Website: pune.nic.in

Pimpaloli is a village in India, situated in Mawal taluka of Pune district in the state of Maharashtra. It encompasses an area of 453 ha (1,119 acres).

== Administration ==
The village is administrated by a sarpanch, an elected representative who leads a gram panchayat. At the time of the 2011 Census of India, the gram panchayat governed three villages and was based at Taje.

== Demographics ==
At the 2011 census, the village comprised 179 households. The population of 1063 was split between 540 males and 523 females.

== Air travel connectivity ==
The closest airport to the village is Pune Airport.

== See also ==
- List of villages in Mawal taluka
