= Outer Ring Road, Pune =

Planned road in Pune, India

Pune Outer Ring Road

Route information
- Maintained by Maharashtra State Road Development Corporation
- Length: 136 km (85 mi)

Major junctions
- North end: Alandi
- To: Khed Shivapur

Location
- Country: India
- State: Maharashtra
- Major cities: Pune, Pimpri-Chinchwad

Highway system
- Roads in India; Expressways; National; State; Asian; State Highways in Maharashtra

The Pune Outer Ring Road (officially MSRDC Ring Road, Pune) is a ring road currently under construction 136-kilometre (85 mi) bypass road encircling Pune, the second-largest city in the Indian state of Maharashtra.

== Background ==
Representatives of the Maharashtra State Road Development Corporation (MSRDC) have declared an alternate Ring Road (Pune Outer Ring Road). Total length of this road is 136 km (85 mi) and will pass through 83 villages around the city. Out of this 39 km (24 mi) will be four lane road and remaining 97.8 km (60.8 mi) will be six lane road. The project will be constructed in two sections of which the western section, which stretches from Urse on the Mumbai-Pune Expressway to Shivare on NH48 as well as the remaining eastern section. The maximum allowed speed on this road is expected to be 120 km/h (75 mph). There are going to be eight tunnels with a total length of 11.29 km (7.02 mi) and a half a kilometer bridge across Khadakwasla dam reservoir.

According to reports published in September 2024, around 90% land was acquired on the western section of road while 70% was acquired on the eastern section of the road. The project construction commenced in late 2024 and is expected to complete by May 2027. The western section is 65.45 km (40.67 mi) which will be completed in five phases varying from 7.5 km (4.7 mi) to 20 km (12 mi), while the eastern section is 71.35 km (44.33 mi) which will be constructed in four phases varying from 11.85 km (7.36 mi) to 24.5 km (15.2 mi).

== Construction ==
| No | Stretch | Section | Length | Contractor |
|---|---|---|---|---|
| 1 | Urse – Kemsewadi | Western | 14.65 km (9.10 mi) | Megha Engineering & Infrastructures |
| 2 | Kemsewadi – Morewadi | Western | 20.00 km (12.43 mi) | Navayuga Engineering Company |
| 3 | Morewadi – Vardade Khamgaon Maval | Western | 14.00 km (8.70 mi) | Navayuga Engineering Company |
| 4 | Vardade Khamgaon Maval – Kalyan Rahatwade | Western | 7.50 km (4.66 mi) | Navayuga Engineering Company |
| 5 | Kalyan Rathwade – Shivare Kusgaon Phase | Western | 9.30 km (5.78 mi) | GR Infraprojects |
| 6 | Urse – Indori | Eastern | 11.85 km (7.36 mi) | Megha Engineering & Infrastructures |
| 7 | Indori – Chimbali | Eastern | 13.80 km (8.57 mi) | PNC Infratech |
| 8 | Chimbali – Solu & Lonikand | Eastern | 21.20 km (13.17 mi) | Megha Engineering & Infrastructures |
| 9 | Lonikand – Walti | Eastern | 24.50 km (15.22 mi) | Roadway Solutions |
| 10 | Valati – Sonori | Eastern | 9.565 km (5.943 mi) | Afcons Infrastructure |
| 11 | Sonori – Garade | Eastern | 16.00 km (9.94 mi) | GR Infraprojects Ltd. |
| 12 | Garade – Shiware | Eastern | 6.240 km (3.877 mi) | Afcons Infrastructure |

== Route ==
The Pune Outer Ring Road will connect the following villages.

- Loni
- Theur
- Kesnand
- Wagholi
- Charholi
- Bhavdi
- Tulapur
- Alandi
- Kelgaon
- Chimbli
- Moee
- Nighoje
- Sangurdi
- Shelarwadi
- Shirgaon
- Chandkhed
- Pachne
- Pimpoli
- Rihe
- Ghotawde
- Pirangut
- Khed Shivapur
- Gogalwadi
- Patharwadi
- Bhivri
- Kanifnath

The total length of this road will be 136 km (85 mi) with a total cost of ₹104.08 billion (US$1.1 billion). Around 40 kilometres (25 mi) of the road will be common with the Pune Inner Ring Road.

== See also ==
- Inner Ring Road, Pune
- High-capacity mass transit route, Pune
- List of roads in Pune
