= Govitri =

Village in Maharashtra

- Village
- Location in Maharashtra, India Govitri (India)
- Coordinates: 18.8059227°N 73.4825277°E
- Country: India
- State: Maharashtra
- District: Pune
- Tehsil: Mawal

Government
  - Type: Panchayati Raj
  - Body: Gram panchayat

Area
  - Total: 349.16 ha (862.8 acres)

Population (2011)
  - Total: 882
  - Density: 253/km^{2} (654/sq mi)
- Sex ratio 463/419 ♂/♀

Languages
  - Official: Marathi
  - Other spoken: Hindi
- Time zone: UTC+5:30 (IST)
- Pin code: 410405
- Telephone code: 02114
- ISO 3166 code: IN-MH
- Vehicle registration: MH-14
- Website: pune.nic.in

Govitri is a village and gram panchayat in India, situated in Mawal taluka of Pune district in the state of Maharashtra. It encompasses an area of 349.16 ha (863 acres).

== Administration ==
The village is administrated by a sarpanch, an elected representative who leads a gram panchayat. At the time of the 2011 Census of India, the village was the headquarters for the eponymous gram panchayat, which also governed the villages of Bhajgaon, Vadavali and Valavanti.

== Demographics ==
At the 2011 census, the village comprised 198 households. The population of 882 was split between 463 males and 419 females.

== Air travel connectivity ==
The closest airport to the village is Pune Airport.

== See also ==
- List of villages in Mawal taluka
