= Velhavali =

Village in Maharashtra

- Village
- Country: India
- State: Maharashtra
- District: Pune
- Tehsil: Mawal

Government
  - Type: Panchayati Raj
  - Body: Gram panchayat

Area
  - Total: 186.80 ha (461.6 acres)

Population (2011)
  - Total: 148
  - Density: 79.2/km^{2} (205/sq mi)
- Sex ratio 81 / 67 ♂/♀

Languages
  - Official: Marathi
  - Other spoken: Hindi
- Time zone: UTC+5:30 (IST)
- Telephone code: 02114
- ISO 3166 code: IN-MH
- Vehicle registration: MH-14
- Website: pune.nic.in

Velhavali is a village in Mawal taluka of Pune district in the state of Maharashtra, India. It encompasses an area of 186.80 ha (462 acres).

== Administration ==
The village is administrated by a sarpanch, an elected representative who leads a gram panchayat. At the time of the 2011 Census of India, the gram panchayat governed four villages and was based at Sangise.

== Demographics ==
As of the 2011 census, the village consisted of 30 households. The population of 148 was split between 81 males and 67 females.

== See also ==
- List of villages in Mawal taluka
