= Sangise =

Village in Maharashtra

- Village
- Location in Maharashtra, India Sangise (India)
- Coordinates: 18.786731°N 73.4508946°E
- Country: India
- State: Maharashtra
- District: Pune
- Tehsil: Mawal

Government
  - Type: Panchayati Raj
  - Body: Gram panchayat

Area
  - Total: 331.09 ha (818.1 acres)

Population (2011)
  - Total: 694
  - Density: 210/km^{2} (543/sq mi)
- Sex ratio 383 / 311 ♂/♀

Languages
  - Official: Marathi
  - Other spoken: Hindi
- Time zone: UTC+5:30 (IST)
- Telephone code: 02114
- ISO 3166 code: IN-MH
- Vehicle registration: MH-14
- Website: pune.nic.in

Sangise is a village and gram panchayat in India, situated in the Mawal taluka of Pune district in the state of Maharashtra. It encompasses an area of 331.09 ha (818 acres).

== Administration ==
The village is administrated by a sarpanch, an elected representative who leads a gram panchayat. At the time of the 2011 Census of India, the village was the headquarters for the eponymous gram panchayat, which also governed the villages of Budhavadi and Velhavali, as well as the uninhabited village of Budhele.

== Demographics ==
At the 2011 census, the village comprised 149 households. The population of 694 was split between 383 males and 311 females.

== See also ==
- List of villages in Mawal taluka
