= Shivali =

Village in Maharashtra

- Village
- Location in Maharashtra, India Shivali (India)
- Coordinates: 18.6747981°N 73.4957994°E
- Country: India
- State: Maharashtra
- District: Pune
- Tehsil: Mawal

Government
  - Type: Panchayati Raj
  - Body: Gram panchayat

Area
  - Total: 504 ha (1,250 acres)

Population (2011)
  - Total: 1,484
  - Density: 294/km^{2} (763/sq mi)
- Sex ratio 780 / 704 ♂/♀

Languages
  - Official: Marathi
  - Other spoken: Hindi
- Time zone: UTC+5:30 (IST)
- Telephone code: 02114
- ISO 3166 code: IN-MH
- Vehicle registration: MH-14
- Website: pune.nic.in

Shivali is a village and gram panchayat in India, situated in the Mawal taluka of Pune district in the state of Maharashtra. It encompasses an area of 504 ha (1,245 acres).

== Administration ==
The village is administrated by a sarpanch, an elected representative who leads a gram panchayat. At the time of the 2011 Census of India, the village was the headquarters for the eponymous gram panchayat, which also governed the village of Bhadawali.

== Demography ==
At the 2011 census, the village comprised 239 households. The population of 1484 was split between 780 males and 704 females.

== See also ==
- List of villages in Mawal taluka
